= Northside United Methodist Church =

- U.S. National Register of Historic Places
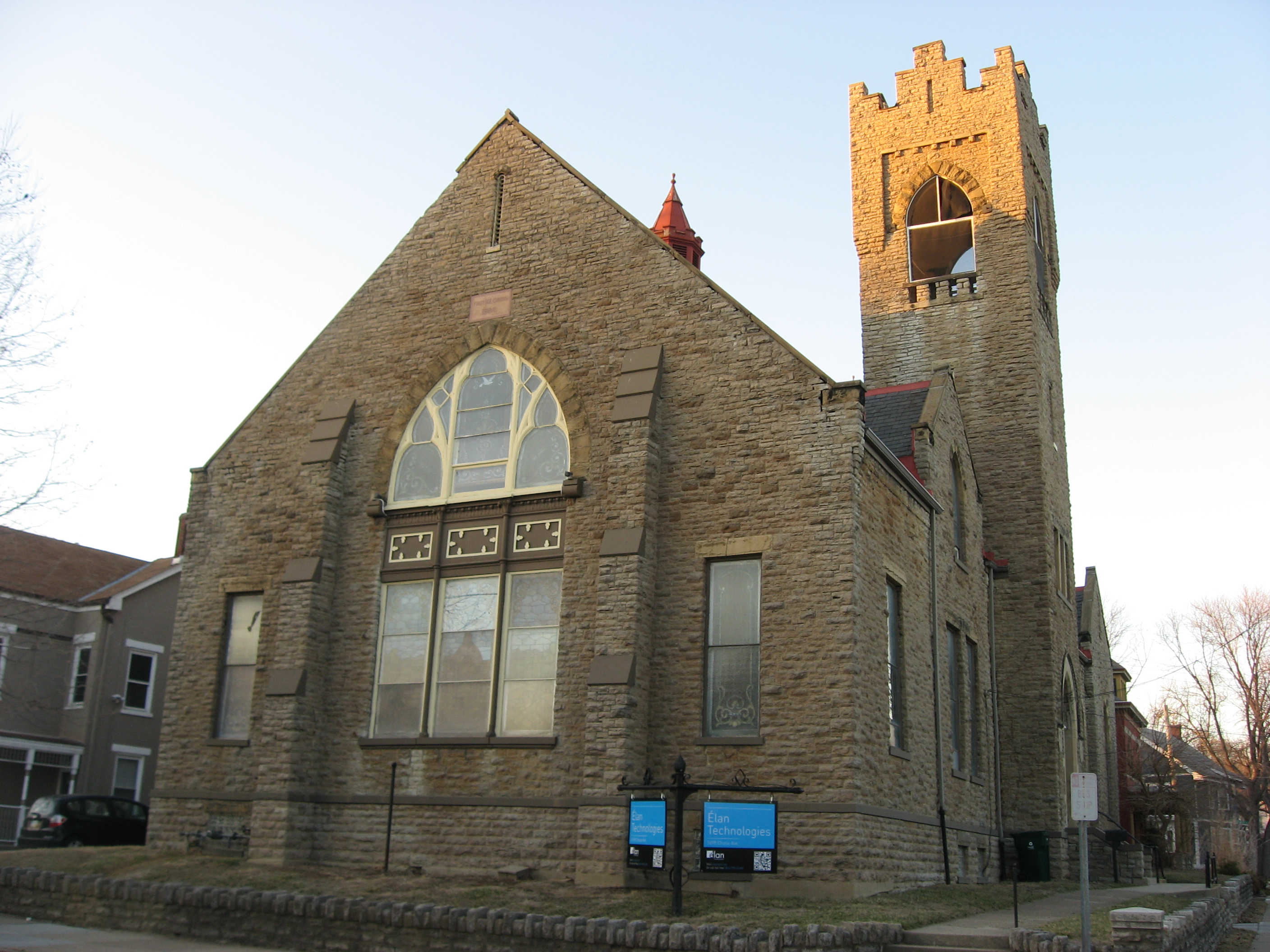
- Front of the church

- Location within Ohio Location within the United States
- Location: 1674 Chase, Cincinnati, Ohio
- Coordinates: 39°9′50″N 84°32′36″W
- Area: Less than 1 acre (0.40 ha)
- Built: 1892
- Architect: Samuel Hannaford
- Architectural style: Gothic Revival
- MPS: Samuel Hannaford and Sons TR in Hamilton County
- NRHP reference No.: 80003068
- Added to NRHP: March 3, 1980

The Northside United Methodist Church is a historic Methodist church in the Northside neighborhood of Cincinnati, Ohio, United States. Constructed in the 1890s for a congregation more than sixty years old, the building has been named a historic site.

The first Methodist Episcopal class in the Northside vicinity formed in the early nineteenth century, and their first building they completed in 1833. Finished in 1892, the present building is the congregation's third; although a second church replaced the pioneer structure, it was destroyed by fire in 1888. After the decision was made to rebuild, the pastor arranged for the architectural services of Samuel Hannaford. At the time, Hannaford was Cincinnati's leading architect, due to his responsibility for the grand Cincinnati Music Hall near downtown. He had further developed his reputation through frequent work with the city's economic and political leaders, producing numerous grand houses in fashionable neighborhoods such as Walnut Hills and Avondale. A Methodist himself, Hannaford was an active member of the Winton Place congregation, and he had designed buildings for the German Methodist Church in Over-the-Rhine as well as for his own church.

Like many other stone Hannaford churches, the Northside Methodist Church is built with rough-faced stone walls. Gothic Revival windows are set throughout the building, which is distinguished by a massive gable-topped section at one end of its irregular floor plan. At one side of the facade rises a tower, within which the main entrance is set. Elements of limestone form the voussoirs around the Gothic Revival arches of the doorway, which frame wrought iron-supported doors and a transom of art glass. The whole building is one and one-half stories tall, although the belfry atop the tower sits above three separate stories. Set upon a stone foundation, the building is topped with a slate roof. The whole structure measures approximately 60 by 95 feet (18 m × 29 m).

In 1980, the church was listed on the National Register of Historic Places, qualifying because of its historically significant architecture. By this time a part of the United Methodist Church, it was one of more than fifty Hannaford-designed buildings listed together as a multiple property submission because of their connection to Hannaford. Among the other buildings in the multiple property submission was the Charles A. Miller House, located two blocks to the west in the same street. No longer a house of worship, it has been divided into a recording studio and a residential section.
