= Morrison House (Cincinnati, Ohio) =

- U.S. National Register of Historic Places
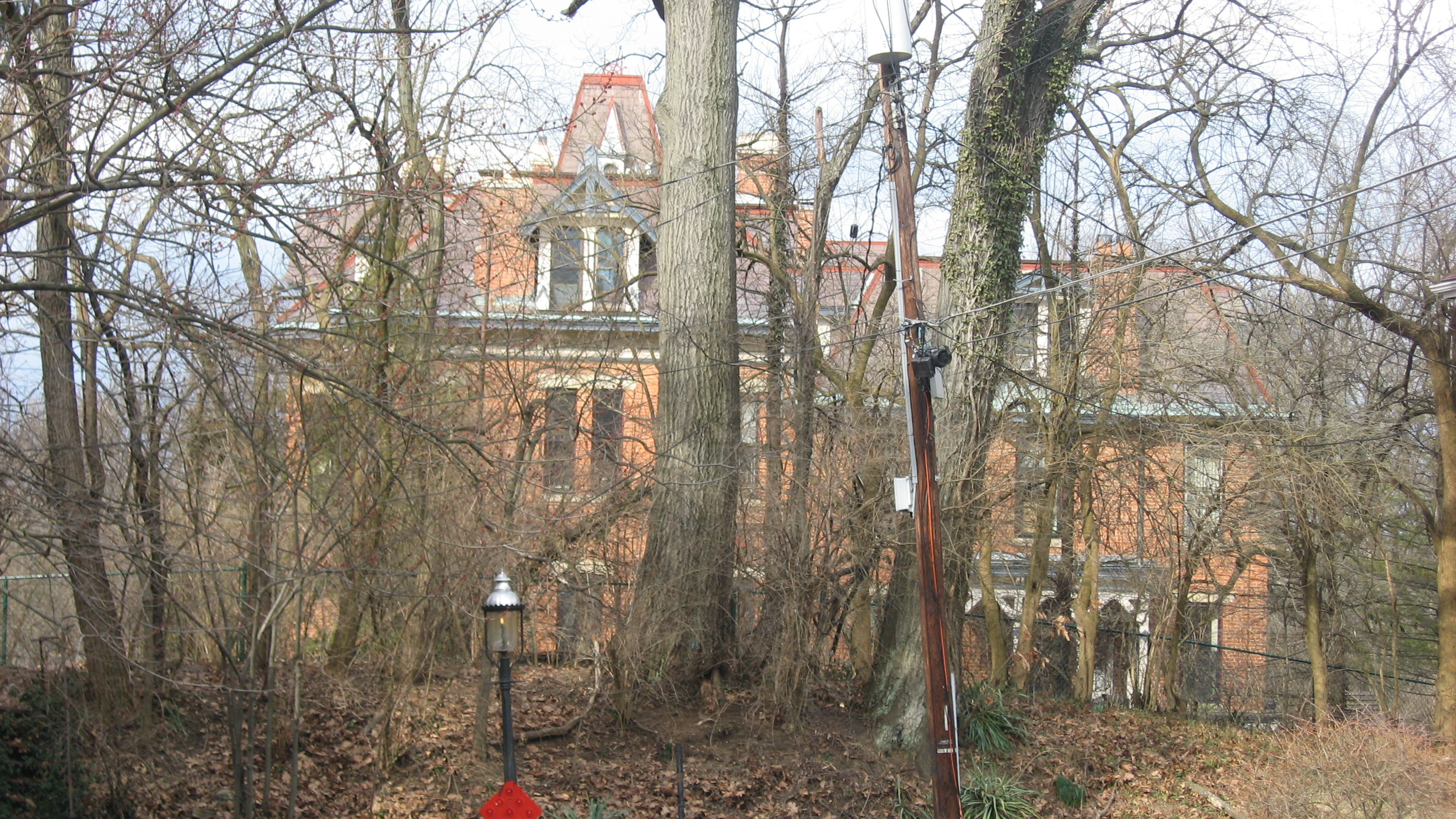
- Eastern side of the house

- Location within Ohio Location within the United States
- Location: 750 Ludlow Ave., Cincinnati, Ohio
- Coordinates: 39°8′54.5″N 84°31′43″W
- Area: 2.5 acres (1.0 ha)
- Built: 1873
- Architect: Samuel Hannaford
- Architectural style: Italianate
- MPS: Samuel Hannaford and Sons TR in Hamilton County
- NRHP reference No.: 73001463
- Added to NRHP: April 3, 1973

The Morrison House is a historic residence in Cincinnati, Ohio, United States. One of the area's first houses designed by master architect Samuel Hannaford, the elaborate brick house was home to the owner of a prominent food-processing firm, and it has been named a historic site.

Born in 1838, Thomas Morrison left his native County Antrim in 1860, where he quickly found employment with Morrison and Cardukes, one of Cincinnati's numerous pork packing firms. After working for the company for nearly forty years, he became the owner in 1897, and under his leadership the company outgrew nearly all of its competitors and became one of the first American meat packing firms to export its products to the United Kingdom and elsewhere in Europe. Morrison was married to the daughter of William Procter, co-founder of Procter & Gamble.

One of Samuel Hannaford's earlier houses in the Cincinnati metropolitan area, the Morrison House was constructed in 1873 and saw the last details added in 1875; it postdated Hannaford's own residence by approximately ten years, but the architect was still comparatively little known when the Morrison House was completed. However, following his Music Hall of Music Hall in the late 1870s, Hannaford became one of Cincinnati's most prominent architects; by the end of the century, the Morrison House was one of several Hannaford designs in the neighborhood of Clifton, and numerous grand Hannaford houses could be found throughout other wealthy neighborhoods such as Walnut Hills and Avondale.

Two and a half stories tall, the Morrison House is a brick building with a slate roof and additional elements of wood and stone. The center of the facade includes a three-story tower projecting forward from the rest of the building, while large dormer windows are placed in the roof on either side of the tower. Each bay of the second and third floors is pierced by a pair of windows, while an elaborate porch fills the first floor of the facade: the sides of the porch are wooden with extensive spindlework, while the center features a large sandstone archway with Corinthian columns. These elements combine to give it an Italianate appearance, although with influence from other styles; this reflects Hannaford's employment of numerous architectural styles through his career.

In 1973, the Morrison House was listed on the National Register of Historic Places, qualifying because of its architecture. Seven years later, it was included in a multiple property submission of dozens of Hannaford-designed buildings in Hamilton County, one of few in the grouping that were already on the Register.
