= Balch House =

Balch House may refer to:

- John Balch House, Beverly, Massachusetts
- Oscar B. Balch House, Oak Park, Illinois
- George Balch House, Cincinnati, Ohio
