= Ransley Apartment Building =

- U.S. National Register of Historic Places
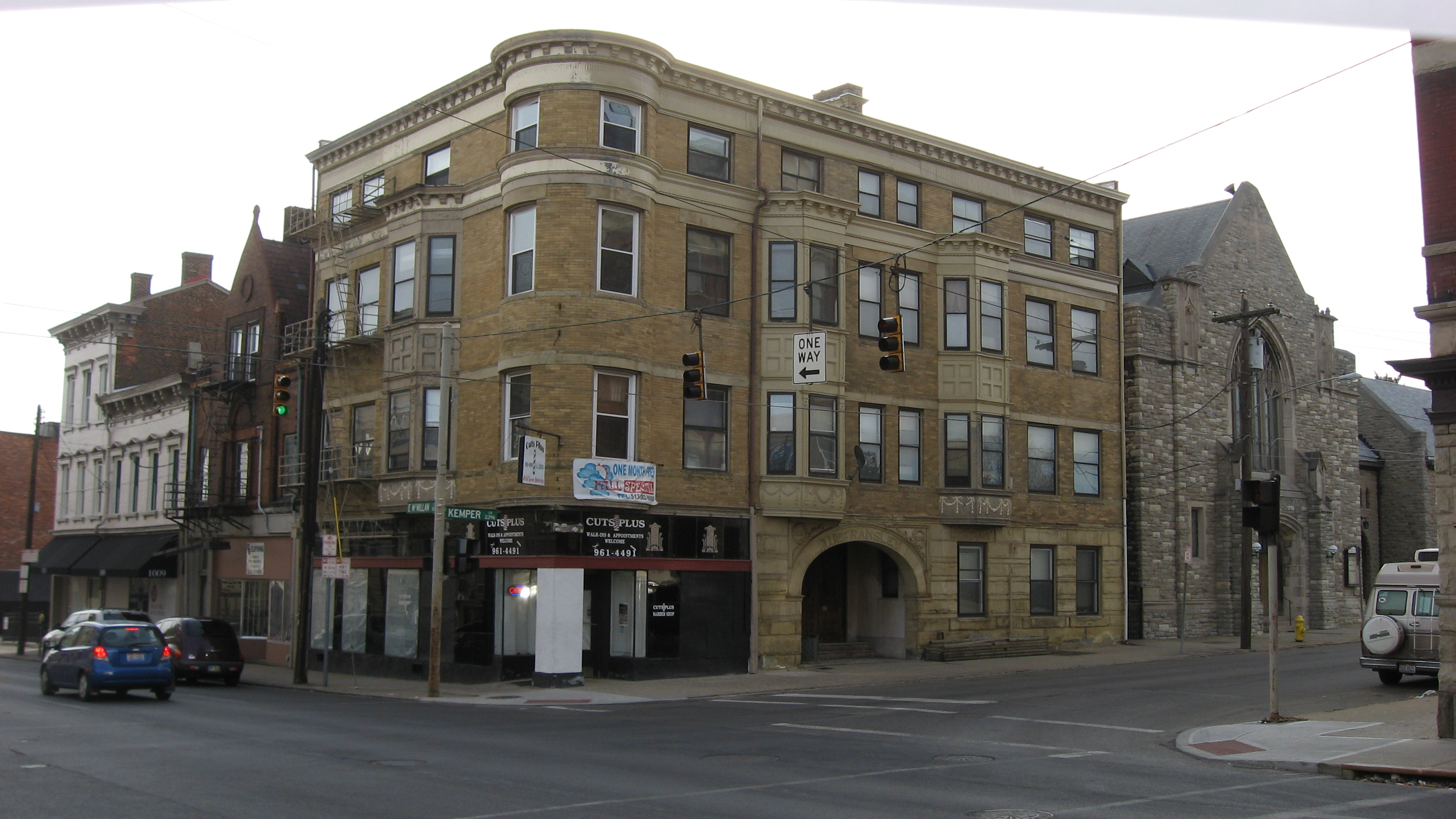
- Front of the building

- Location within Ohio Location within the United States
- Location: 2390 Kemper Lane, Cincinnati, Ohio
- Coordinates: 39°7′32″N 84°29′16″W
- Area: Less than 1 acre (0.40 ha)
- Built: 1895
- Architect: Samuel Hannaford & Sons
- Architectural style: Victorian, Romanesque Revival
- MPS: Samuel Hannaford and Sons TR in Hamilton County
- NRHP reference No.: 80003079
- Added to NRHP: March 3, 1980

The Ransley Apartment Building is a historic apartment building in the Walnut Hills neighborhood of Cincinnati, Ohio, United States. Built in the 1890s, it was designed by one of Cincinnati's most important architects, and it has been named a historic site.

During the late 19th century, S.C. and L.A. Ransley were a pair of businessmen in Cincinnati; by the 1890s, they owned a chain of three confectionery stores in various parts of the city. One of their properties was located along Kemper Lane on the southeastern corner of its intersection with McMillan Street, and it was here that they chose to erect a large new structure with plenty of residential space. To design the building, they chose prominent architect Samuel Hannaford, the regionally famous architect celebrated for designing important city buildings such as City Hall and Music Hall.

Three and a half stories tall, the Ransley Apartment Building is built of both brick and stone; the stonework is the ashlar of the first floor, while the other floors are brick. One enters the building through a recessed main doorway on the first floor, framed by a large stone archway; inscriptions "The Ransley" and "A.D. 1895" appear on and around the archway. Among the other major components of the design is a turret on the building's main corner, facing the intersection. Although the building's architecture has been described as a generic "Victorian", many of its components evince clear Romanesque Revival themes.

In early 1980, the Ransley was listed on the National Register of Historic Places, qualifying because of its historically significant architecture. It was part of a large group of Hannaford-designed buildings added to the Register together as a multiple property submission: 55 buildings composed the whole group, including 4 apartment buildings.
