= Greene County Courthouse (Ohio) =

Local government building in the United States

The Greene County Courthouse
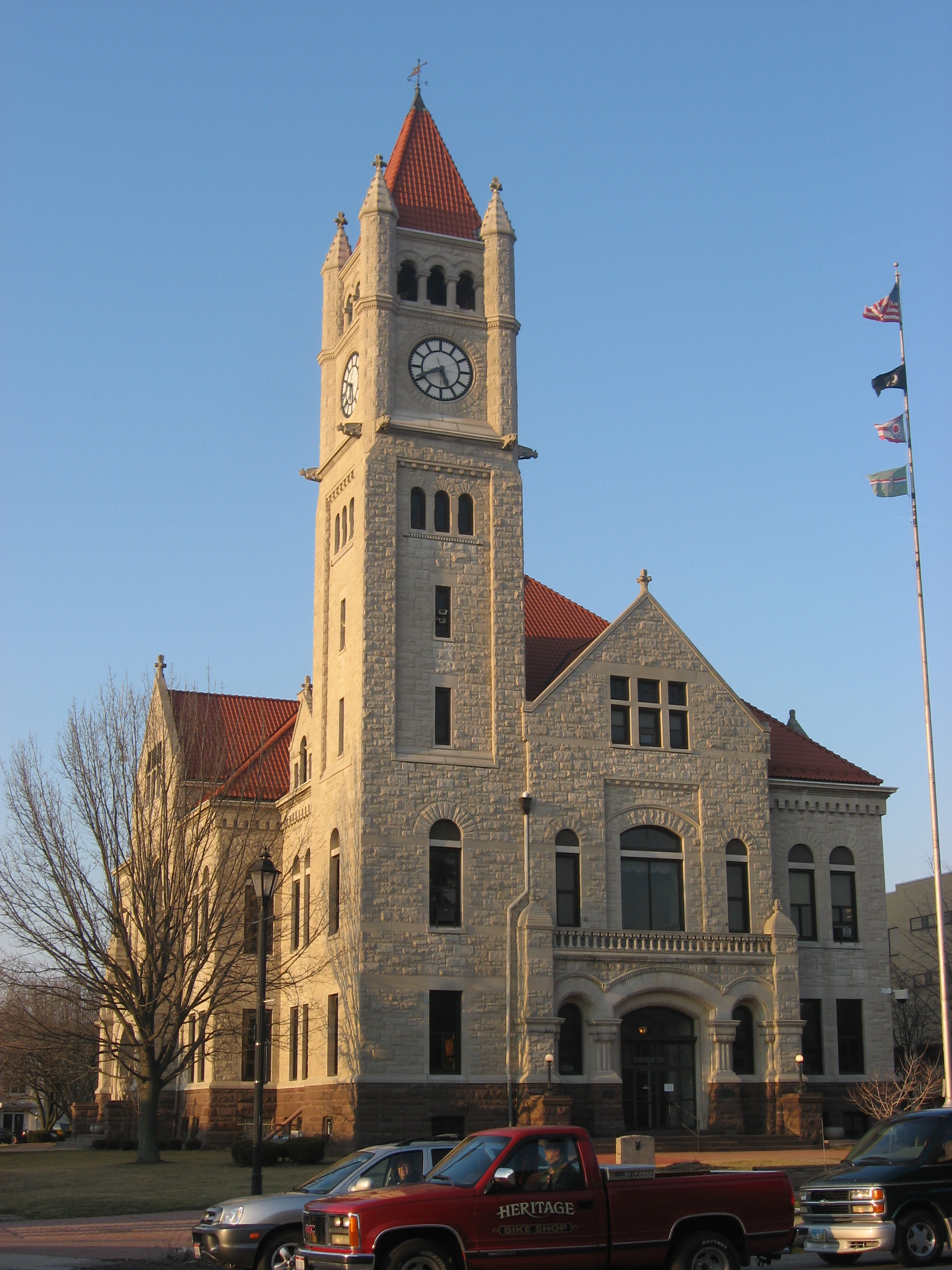
- Front of the courthouse
- Interactive map of the The Greene County Courthouse area

General information
- Architectural style: Richardsonian Romanesque
- Location: Xenia, Ohio, United States
- Coordinates: 39°41′8″N 83°55′44″W
- Construction started: 1901
- Completed: 1902
- Cost: $191,764.50
- Client: Greene County Commissioners

Design and construction
- Architects: Samuel Hannaford & Sons

The Greene County Courthouse is located at 45 North Detroit Street in Xenia, Ohio. The building was designed by Samuel Hannaford & Sons and was completed in 1902.

== History ==
Construction of this, Greene County's third courthouse, began in 1901. The architects of the Greene County Courthouse were Samuel Hannaford and Sons, who completed the building in 1902 at a cost of $191,746. Hannaford was also the architect of the Cincinnati City Hall, which shares very similar architectural styling and was built 13 years earlier.

== Clock tower ==
The primary feature of the building is its 145-foot-tall (44 m) clock tower. The clock is from Michigan and has a weight of 4,500 pounds inside of a frame that weighs 3,000 pounds. The clock bells ring every hour indicating the time. Before 1941, the bells were rung manually by a custodian worker each hour. The clock was electrified in 1941 and now rings on its own.
