= Cincinnatian Hotel =

- Palace Hotel
- U.S. National Register of Historic Places
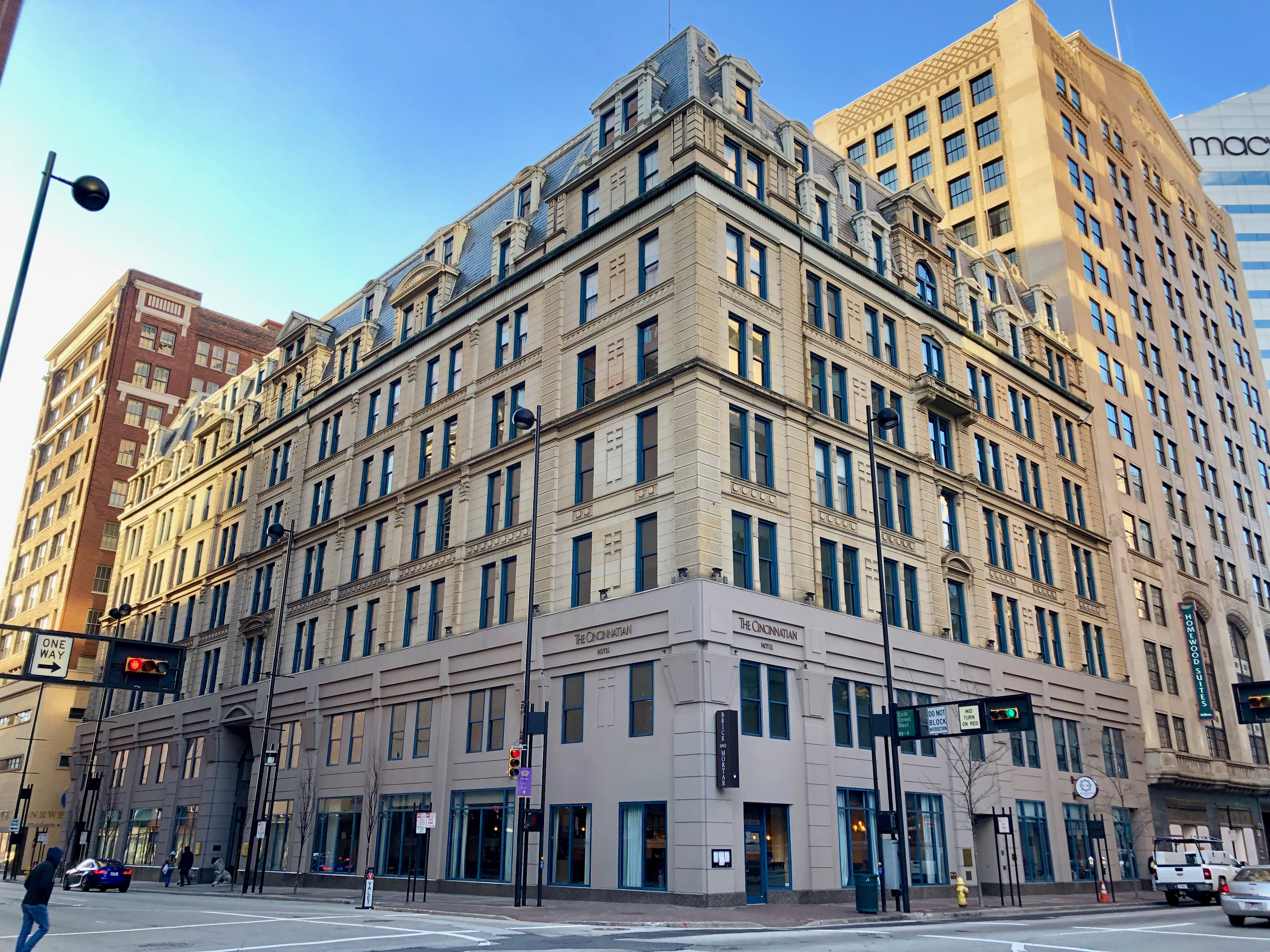
- Location: Sixth and Vine streets, Cincinnati, Ohio
- Coordinates: 39°6′8.81″N 84°30′47.83″W
- Built: 1882
- Built by: Thomas Emery's Sons
- Architect: Thomas J. Emery and Samuel Hannaford
- Architectural style: Second Empire
- MPS: Samuel Hannaford and Sons TR in Hamilton County
- NRHP reference No.: 80003071
- Added to NRHP: March 3, 1980

The Cincinnatian Hotel is a registered historic building in Downtown Cincinnati, Ohio, listed in the National Register on March 3, 1980. It is a member of the Historic Hotels of America, the official program of the National Trust for Historic Preservation. Since 2018, the hotel has been owned by SREE Hotels of Charlotte and the hotel has been managed by Hilton Worldwide and is part of its upscale Curio Collection brand.

== History ==
Built in 1882, The Cincinnatian Hotel was designed as a "Grand Hotel" of the 19th century. Originally named the Palace Hotel, the eight-story French Second Empire hotel was the tallest building in Cincinnati and designed by the same architect as Cincinnati's Music Hall and City Hall. The Palace Hotel featured 300 guest rooms and a shared bathroom at either end of each corridor. The Palace hotel provided modern improvements such as electric lights and hydraulic elevators to its guests. There were hitching posts outside and the hotel was located where the trolley cars made their turn.

The hotel was renamed the Palace Hotel Cincinnatian on September 24, 1948, which was then shortened to the Hotel Cincinnatian in 1951.

The hotel underwent a massive $25 million renovation in 1987, that added a glass-domed atrium and reduced the 300 guest rooms to 146 rooms including seven suites. The renovation retained the hotel's marble and walnut grand staircase. The original Cricket Restaurant was replaced by the Palace Restaurant and the Cricket Lounge.

In 2017, the hotel was purchased by SREE Hotels of Charlotte. After extensive remodeling in 2018, which left only the marble and walnut grand staircase as the only part of the interior of the hotel from 1882, the hotel reopened under the management of Hilton Worldwide and became part of its upscale Curio Collection brand. The Palace Restaurant and the Cricket Lounge were replaced by the Hannaford Market, where breakfast and brunch are served and named for the architect of the building, and Brick and Mortar, a gastropub.
