= Van Wormer =

Van Wormer may refer to:

- Randall Edwin Van Wormer (1955–2004), birth name of American singer-songwriter Randy VanWarmer
- Steve Van Wormer (born 1969), American actor and comedian
- Van Wormer Library, building at the University of Cincinnati, United States
