= Mary A. Wolfe House =

Historic house in Ohio, United States

- U.S. National Register of Historic Places
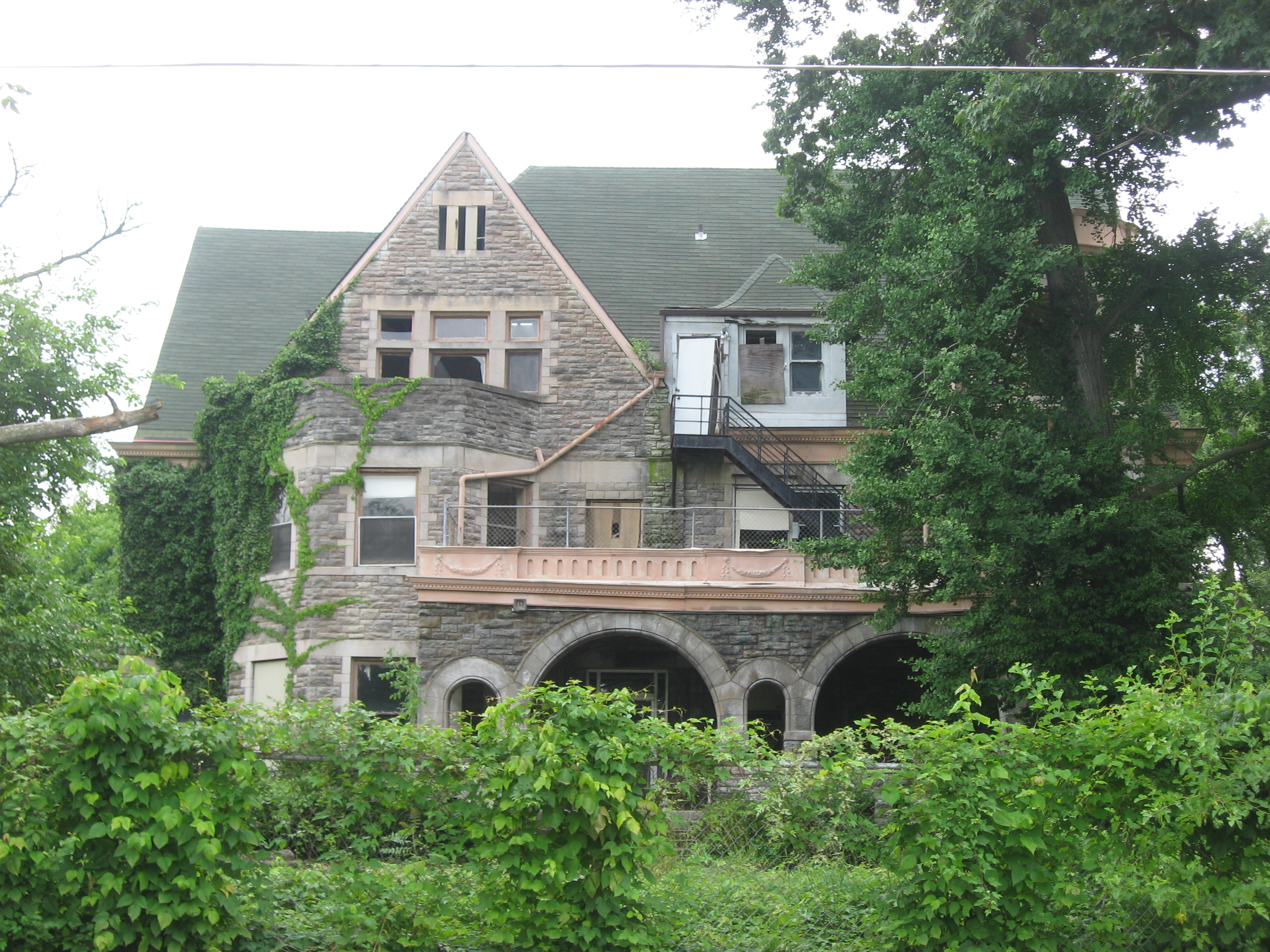
- Front of the house in 2011

- Location within Ohio Location within the United States
- Location: 965 Burton Ave., Cincinnati, Ohio
- Coordinates: 39°8′59″N 84°29′1″W
- Area: Less than 1 acre (0.40 ha)
- Built: 1888
- Architect: Samuel Hannaford & Sons
- Architectural style: Romanesque
- MPS: Samuel Hannaford and Sons TR in Hamilton County
- NRHP reference No.: 80003092
- Added to NRHP: March 3, 1980

Mary A. Wolfe House is a registered historic building in Cincinnati, Ohio, listed in the National Register on March 3, 1980.

It is one of multiple places associated with architect Samuel Hannaford that were listed on the National Register as part of a 1978 Thematic Resource study.

The house was demolished in 2019.
