= Elsinore Arch =

- U.S. National Register of Historic Places
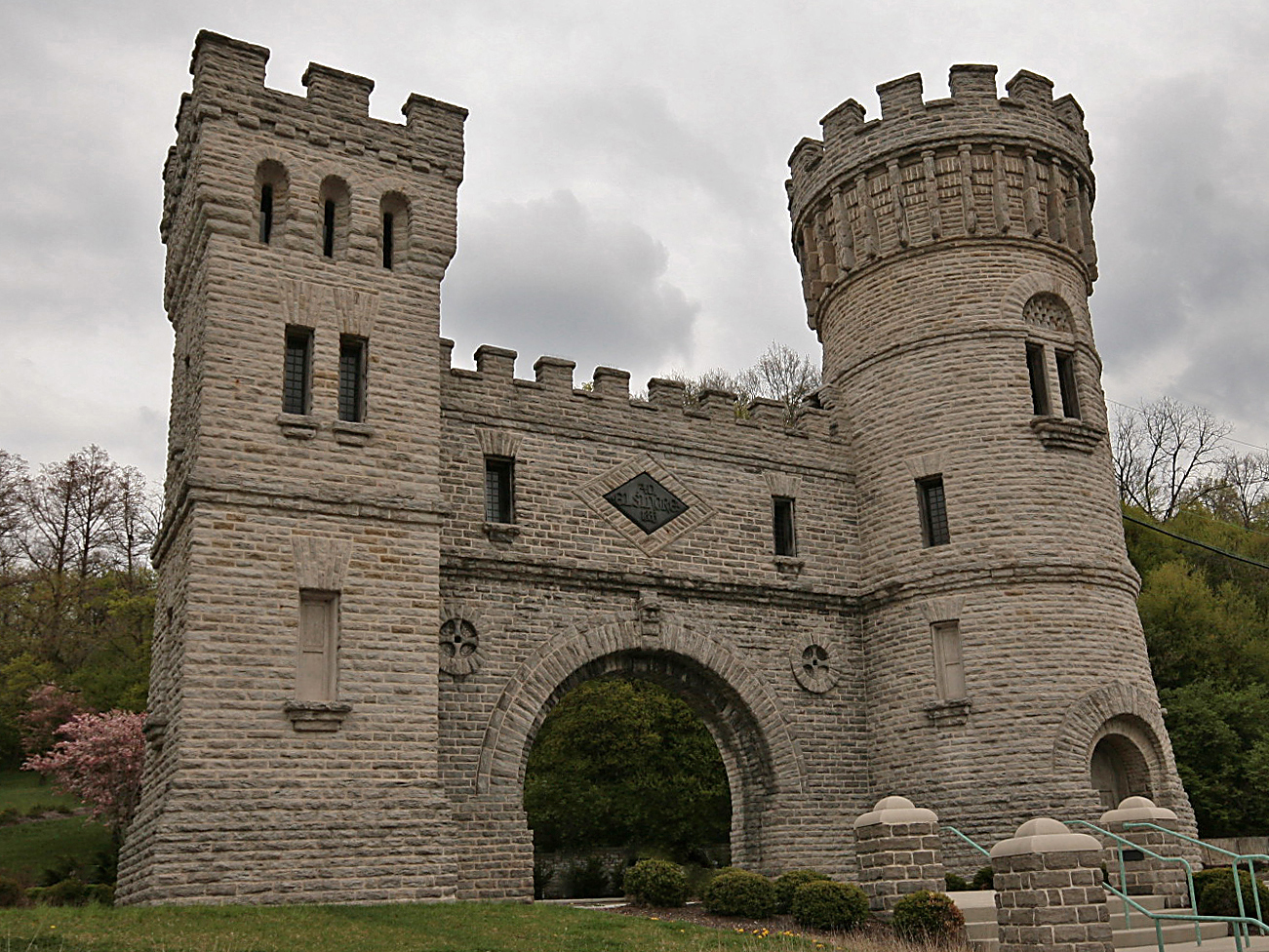
- Location: 1700 Gilbert Avenue, Cincinnati, Ohio
- Coordinates: 39.113055°N 84.499685°W
- Architect: Charles Hannaford
- Architectural style: Late Victorian and Other
- MPS: Samuel Hannaford and Sons TR in Hamilton County
- NRHP reference No.: 80003052
- Added to NRHP: March 3, 1980

Elsinore Arch (also known as Elsinore Tower) is a registered historic structure in Cincinnati, Ohio, listed in the National Register on March 3, 1980. The building, at Gilbert Avenue and Elsinore Place, was constructed in 1883 for the Cincinnati Water Works. It's said to be inspired by the Elsinore Castle (Kronborg) featured in Hamlet.

In 1883, the Cincinnati Water Works wanted to extend its efficient water supply main tunnel (which had remained incomplete for several years) 185 feet to the line at Gilbert Avenue. This efficient main started at the reservoir in Eden Park. To control the flow of water at the base of the steep hill, a valve house was needed. Because the Water Works wanted to enhance the landscape of the park, plus they wanted a structure that would also serve as a new entrance to the park, they felt that the valve house needed to have a special design.

That spring, Cincinnati was host to the Shakespearean Dramatic Festival at Music Hall. The highlight of the festival was the performance of "Hamlet" on Friday evening, May 4. The Shakespearean actor James Edward Murdoch played the role of Hamlet. Even at the age of 72, this actor was very popular in Cincinnati, mainly because Cincinnati was his hometown. Although many in the audience felt that Mr. Murdock was too old to play the role of Hamlet, they were highly impressed with the stage sets, especially the opening scene. This particular stage set was a 65-by-65 foot painting of Elsinore Castle (also known as Kronberg Castle), where the moody Denmark prince walked at night and spoke with the ghost of his father. A local artist named Merry painted this stage set. In the audience that night was Water Works Superintendent A.G. Moore. He was so impressed with the painting of Elsinore Castle that that next Monday morning he appeared at the offices of Samuel Hannaford and Sons (famous local architectural firm that designed, among other structures, Music Hall and the Cincinnati City Hall) with a newspaper illustration of the Elsinore stage set. What resulted was that Charles B. Hannaford, the son of Samuel, was commissioned to design the valve house in the form of Elsinore Castle. The Elsinore Tower was built later that year for a cost of $15,000.

What resulted is the Norman Romanesque Revival mini-castle consisting of a cylindrical castellated tower joined to a smaller square tower by a battlemented archway. Since the Cincinnati Art Museum officially opened in 1886, a flight of Cincinnati steps were placed behind the Elsinore Tower as a short cut to the museum in Eden Park. However, the steps were too steep to ever become popular; and with the ever-increasing prevalence of motorized travel, the Elsinore Tower soon lost its appeal as an entrance to the Park. As of 1988, it was reported that the reservoir valves were housed in a vault underneath the tower and that the Cincinnati Water Works used the Elsinore Tower for equipment storage.

The adjacent WCPO-TV building was built with stonework similar to that used in the arch's construction. (That same building site was once the home of Cincinnati's Natural History Museum.)

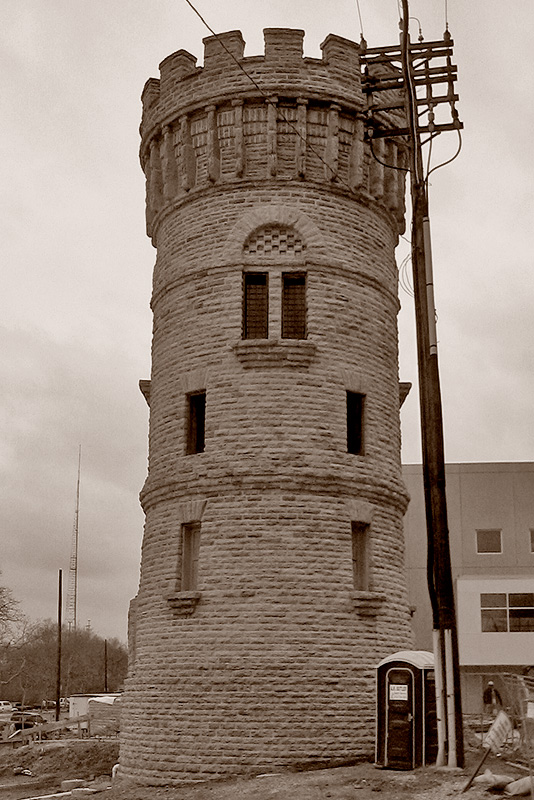
Elsinore Arch on March 8, 2004, as the new WCPO-TV building was finishing construction.
