= Hoffman Elementary School =

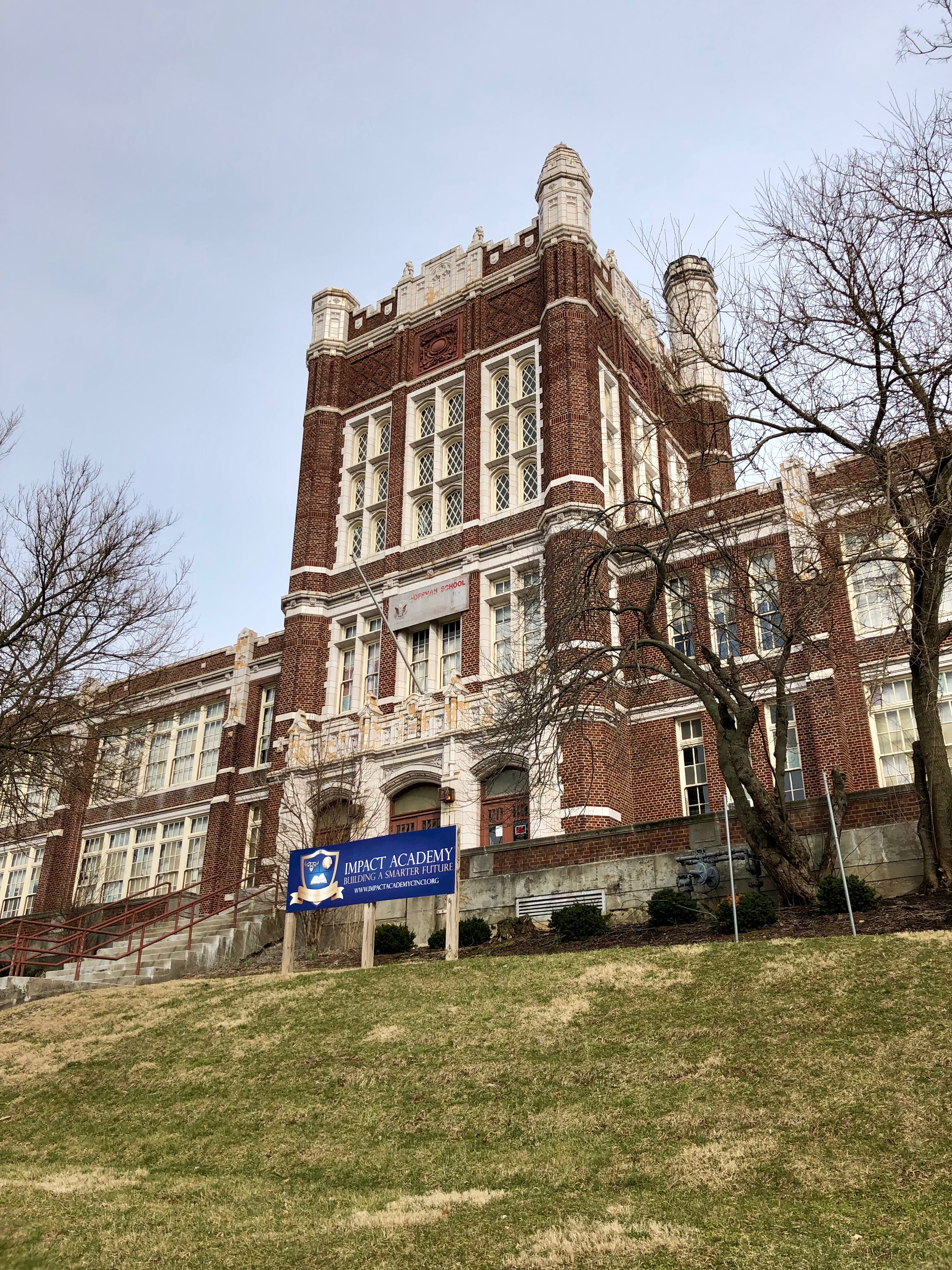
- Interactive map of the Hoffman Elementary School area

General information
- Location: 3060 Durrell Ave, Cincinnati, Ohio
- Coordinates: 39.134220°N 84.477961°W
- Year built: 1922

Design and construction
- Architecture firm: Samuel Hannaford & Sons

Hoffman Elementary School is a former elementary school in the Evanston neighborhood of Cincinnati, Ohio.

The building was designed by the architectural firm Samuel Hannaford and Sons. It was constructed in 1922. Around 2012, Cincinnati Public Schools planned to tear it down, but instead sold it at auction to a single individual, who donated it to the Christ Temple Baptist Church. In 2023, the church hoped to sell the building to a real estate developer who wanted to demolish the building and construct apartments on the site. The Cincinnati Preservation Association responded with an application to list the building as a Cincinnati Local Historic Landmark. The application was approved by the Historic Conservation Board in May 2023, but was subsequently denied by the Cincinnati City Council.
