= Alms and Doepke Dry Goods Company =

- U.S. National Register of Historic Places
- U.S. Historic district – Contributing property
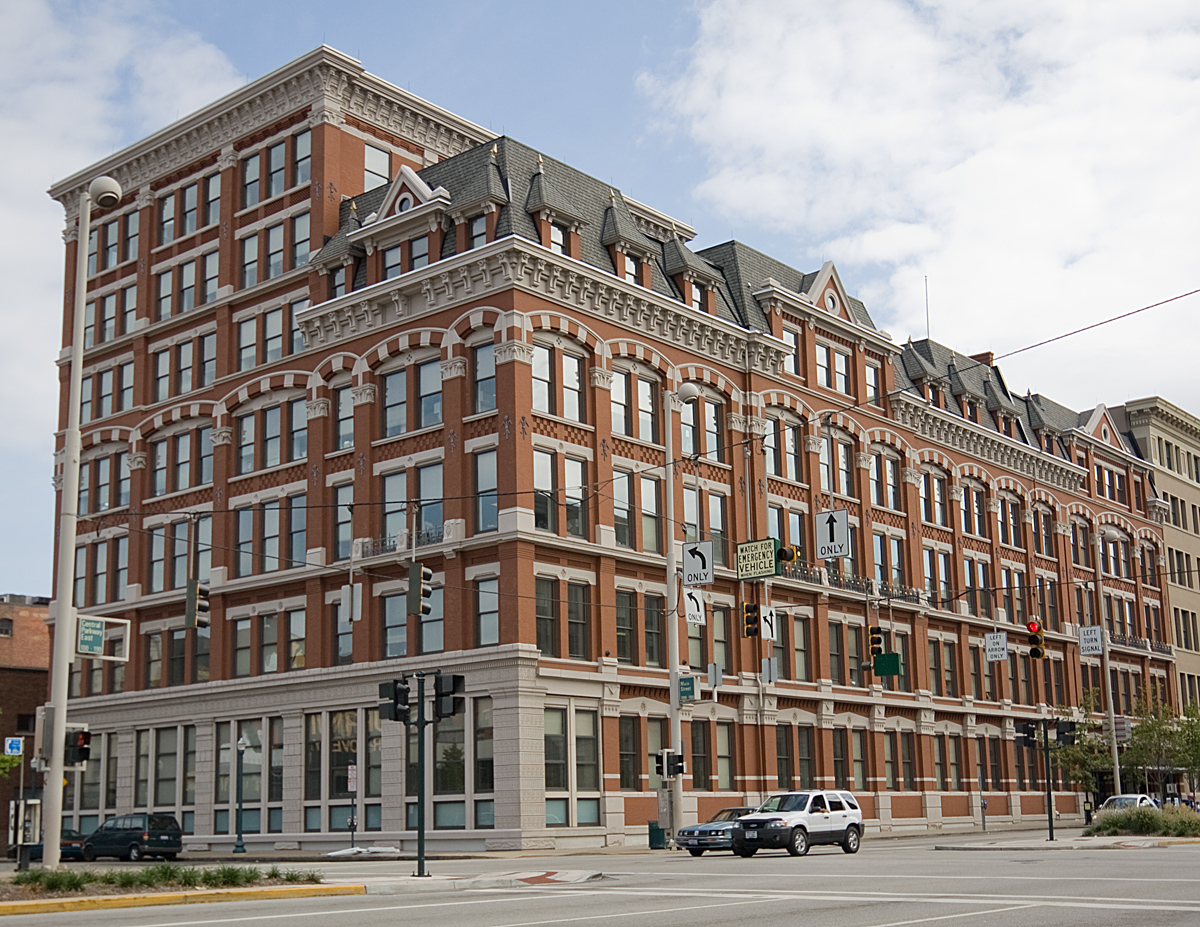
- Front and side of the building in 2008

- Location within Ohio Location within the United States
- Location: 222 E. Central Parkway, Cincinnati, Ohio
- Coordinates: 39°6′29″N 84°30′37″W
- Area: less than one acre
- Built: 1878
- Architect: Samuel Hannaford; Daniel Burnham & Co.
- Architectural style: Late Victorian
- Part of: Over-the-Rhine Historic District (ID83001985)
- MPS: Samuel Hannaford and Sons TR in Hamilton County
- NRHP reference No.: 80003035
- Added to NRHP: March 3, 1980

The Alms and Doepke Dry Goods Company is a historic commercial building in Cincinnati, Ohio, United States. Located along Central Parkway on the edge of downtown, it is a late Victorian structure designed by Samuel Hannaford, a renowned Cincinnati architect.

Seven stories tall, it is a brick building with a stone foundation and a slate roof. Major architectural elements include an ornate cornice with heavy bracketing and its Mansard roof that is pierced by many dormers.

== History ==
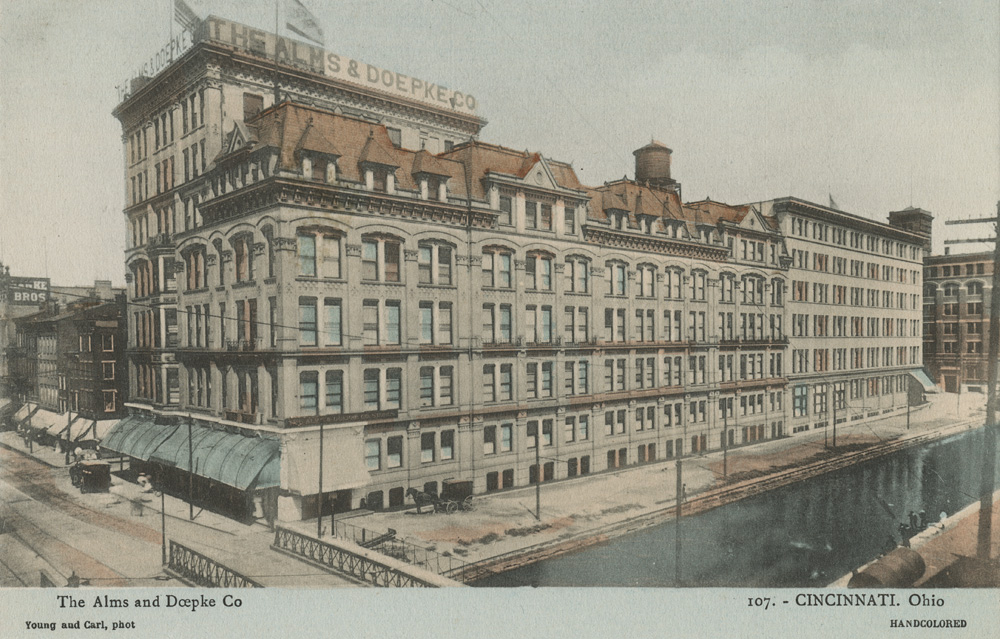
Undated postcard depicting the building from across the Miami and Erie Canal

William F. Doepke, with his first cousins William H. Alms and Frederick H. Alms, established a dry goods store in Cincinnati in 1865 and moved to the northeastern corner of the intersection of Main Street and the Miami and Erie Canal two years later. Starting in 1878, they erected the core of the present structure at that location. The building was designed by Samuel Hannaford and Edwin R. Proctor, the former of which was one of Cincinnati's most prestigious architects at the time. The building was designed in an eclectic architectural style. It consists of brick walls with a trim of pale stone. The brick was originally white and remained so for 90 years before being painted red. Its massing is divided into distinct pavilions, which are topped by a broken mansard roof with dormers. Hannaford and Proctor were contemporaneously working on Cincinnati Music Hall, and the Alms & Doepke building shares some design elements with that structure, such as checkerboard corbels.

Hannaford & Sons was hired to design additions to the building in 1886, 1890, and 1897. A final eastern addition, designed by renowned Chicago architect Daniel Burnham's firm D. H. Burnham & Company, began construction in 1906 and was completed in 1912. Burnham's addition differed sharply from the rest of the building, as it followed the Beaux-Arts school of architecture and consisted of "pale buff brick with a restrained classical trim". The addition remained white after the rest of the structure was painted red. With its additions, the building ultimately came to occupy its entire block.

By the late nineteenth century, Alms and Doepke had built a reputation as the region's leading dry goods firm; eight hundred individuals were on its payroll in 1891. After ninety years of operation, Alms and Doepke closed permanently in 1955. Its headquarters endured after its demise; its architecture was sufficiently well preserved to qualify the building for inclusion on the National Register of Historic Places in 1980, along with dozens of other Hannaford buildings. Three years later, it was one of more than two thousand buildings in the Over-the-Rhine neighborhood added to the Register together as a historic district, the Over-the-Rhine Historic District.

The Hamilton County government acquired the building in 1993. In 1995, it was restored and converted into an office structure by architectural firm Gartner, Burdick, Bauer-Nilsen. The structure housed the county's Job and Family Services and human resources departments, as it is located across Central Parkway from the Hamilton County Courthouse.

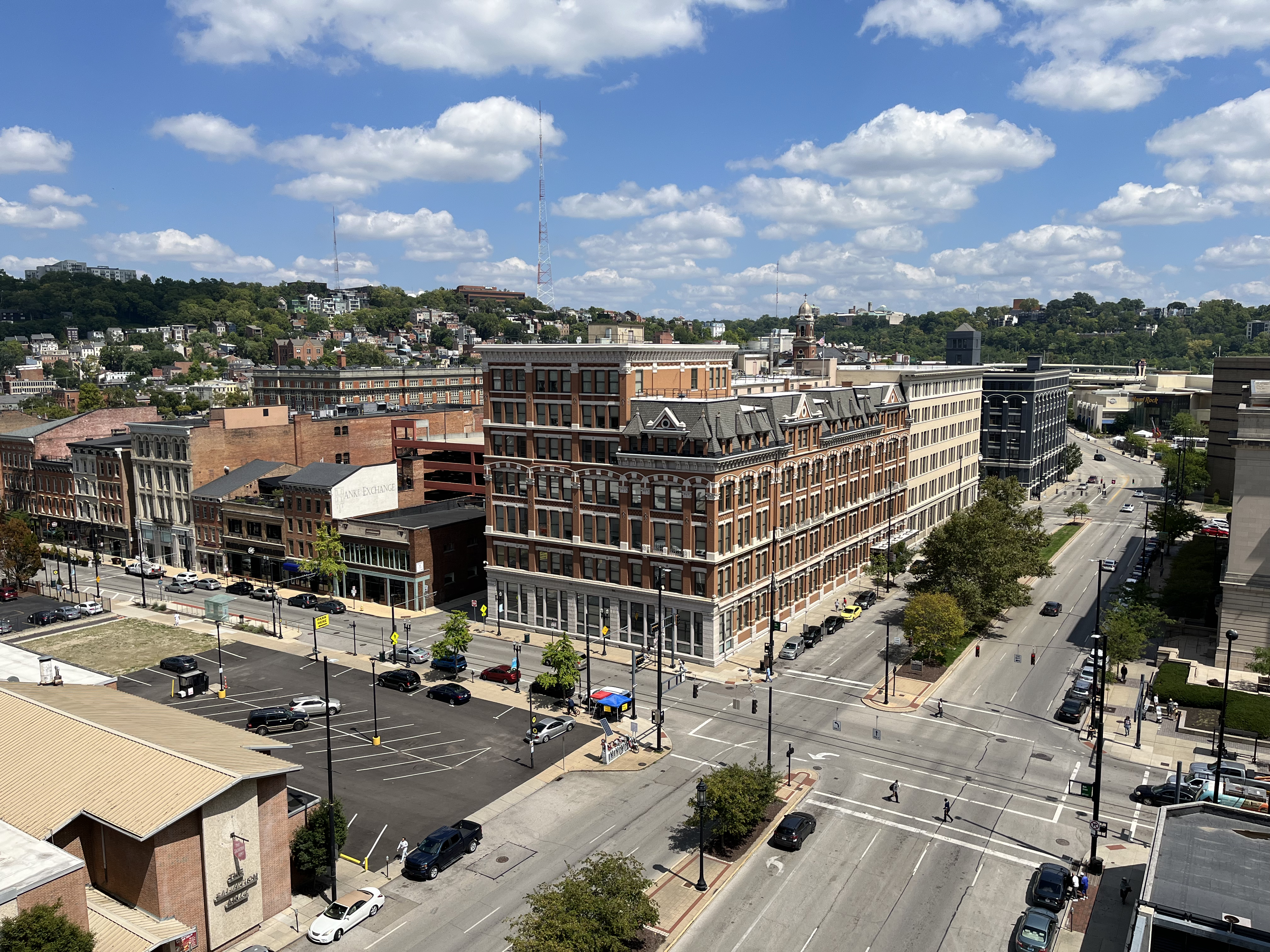
The building and surroundings viewed from the nearby 1010 On The Rhine building in 2023

On December 11, 2025, Hamilton County Commissioners voted to sell the building to a partnership of two developers for $11.2 million. Stough Development Corp., which owned properties north of the building and had "been eyeing the property for 60 years", was the majority partner, with Chavez Properties having a minority stake. The sale was part of Hamilton County's plan to consolidate its offices at the former Bon Secours Mercy Health headquarters in Bond Hill. The developers announced a plan to convert the building into a residential structure with 150 apartments, two storefronts, and amenities. HGC Construction was slated to carry out the conversion, with New Republic Architecture performing design work. The developers sought to open the redesigned building by early 2028.

In late March 2026, Hamilton County transferred ownership of the building to the Community Improvement Corp. of Greater Cincinnati (CIC) with the intention that CIC would subsequently give the building to the apartment developers. By that time, the conversion had an estimated cost of $64.3 million, of which $47.7 million was projected to be spent on rehabilitation. CIC applied for state historic preservation tax credits for the conversion on behalf of the developers, as the credits had a March 31 application deadline and the developers were not expected to finalize their acquisition of the building for at least another month. The project was already slated to receive $9.5 million in federal preservation tax credits at the time. In late June, the state approved the request for $5 million in tax credits. The Cincinnati Historic Conservation Board unanimously endorsed the planned renovation on June 29. Specifically, the Board agreed to allow the developers to add a rooftop deck, restore the building to its original white color, and construct a skywalk between the structure and a county-owned parking garage at 1123 Sycamore Street that would be available for tenant use.
