= Ohio National Guard Armory =

- U.S. National Register of Historic Places
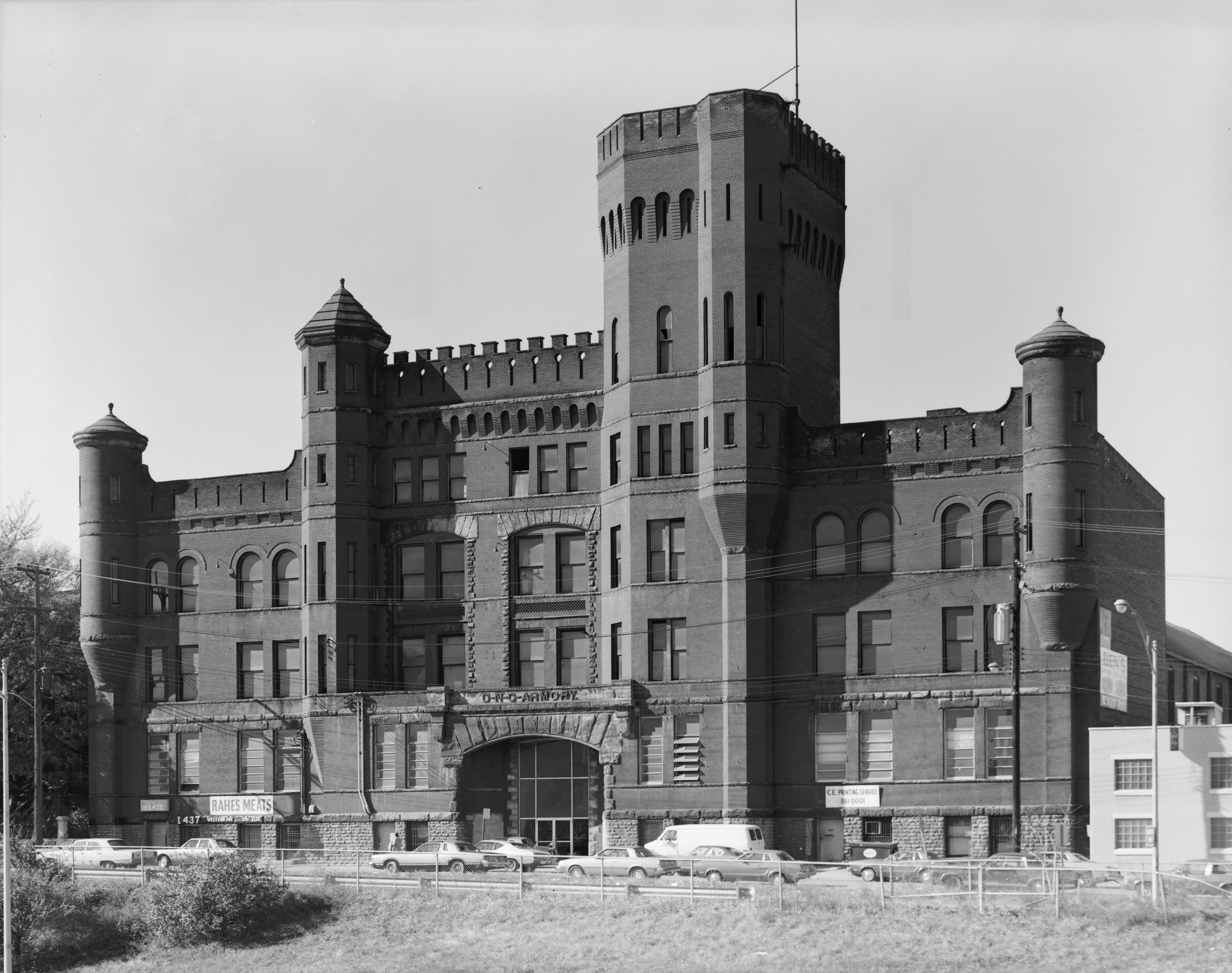
- Front of the armory

- Location within Ohio Location within the United States
- Location: 1437-1439 Western Ave., Cincinnati, Ohio
- Coordinates: 39°6′41″N 84°31′57″W
- Area: 1 acre (0.40 ha)
- Built: 1886
- Architect: Samuel Hannaford & Sons; James Griffith & Son
- Architectural style: Late Victorian, Victorian Eclectic
- MPS: Samuel Hannaford and Sons TR in Hamilton County
- NRHP reference No.: 80003069
- Added to NRHP: March 3, 1980

Ohio National Guard Armory is a registered historic building in Cincinnati, Ohio, listed in the National Register on March 3, 1980. It was designed by Samuel Hannaford who won a competition for the design, beating out Charles Crapsey and others.

== Historic uses ==
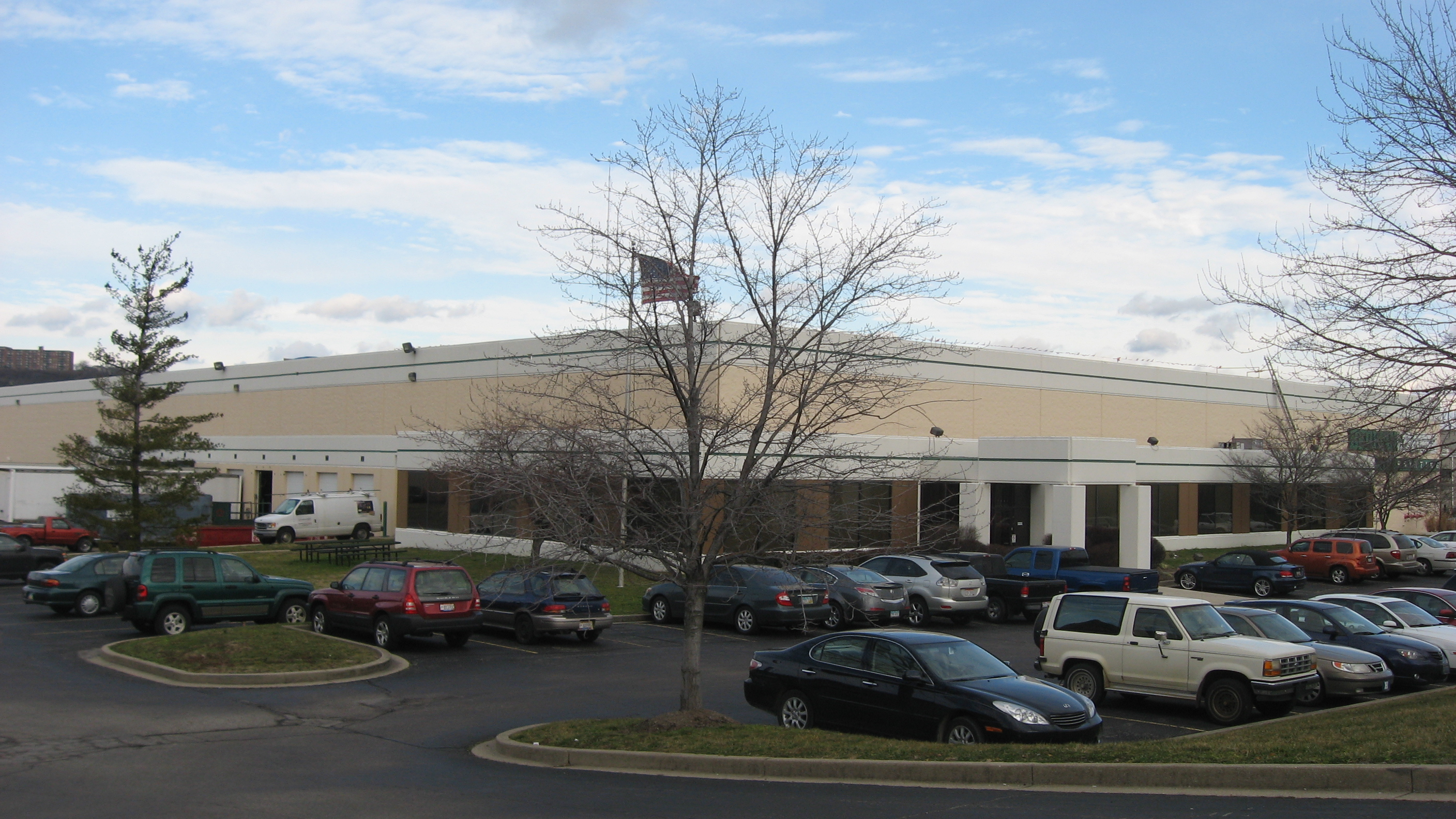
Site of the armory

- Military Facility
