= Nast Trinity United Methodist Church =

- First German Methodist Episcopal Church
- U.S. National Register of Historic Places
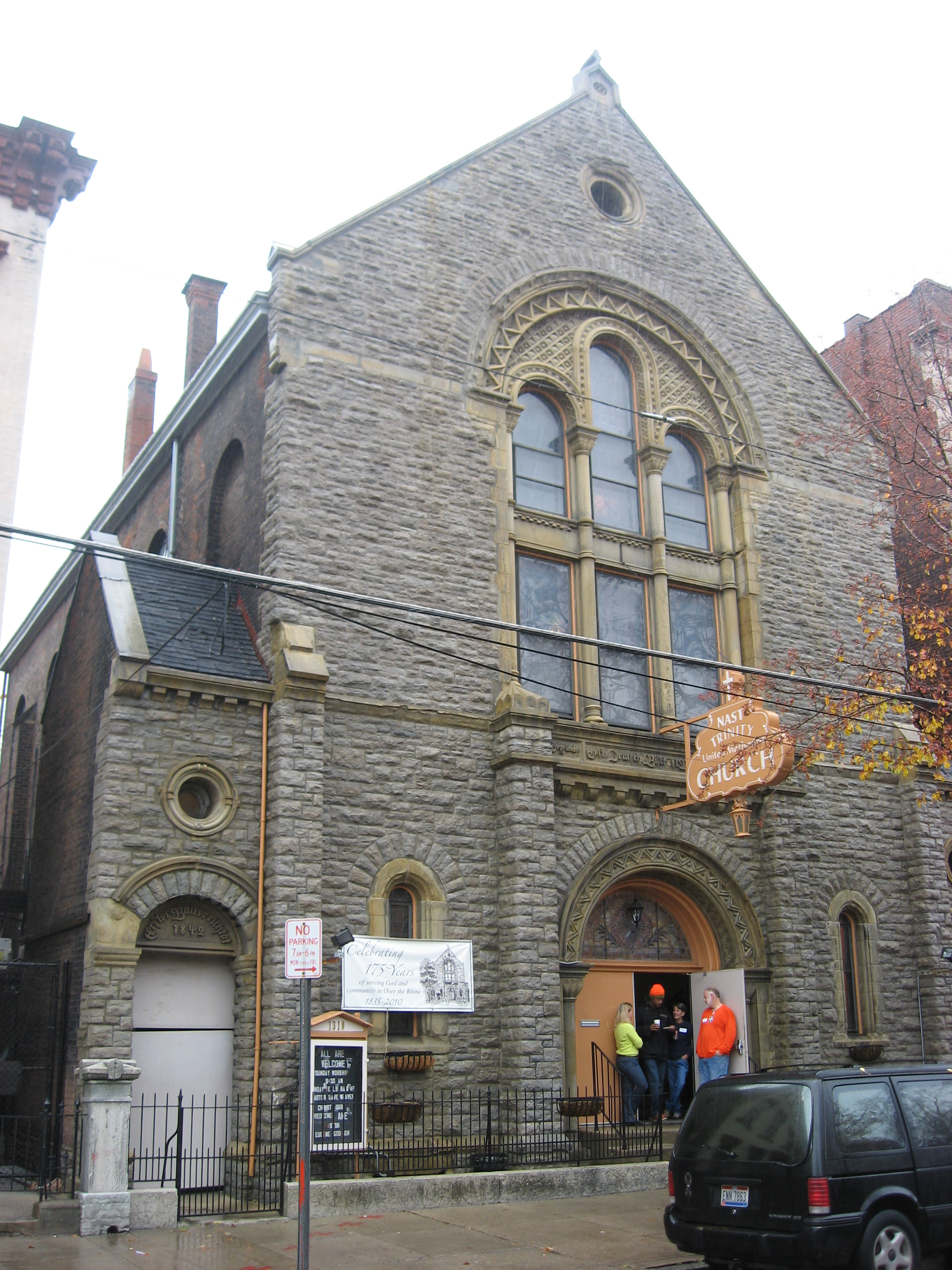
- Front of the church

- Location within Ohio Location within the United States
- Location: 1310 Race St., Cincinnati, Ohio
- Coordinates: 39°6′35″N 84°30′59″W
- Area: less than one acre
- Built: 1880
- Architect: Samuel Hannaford
- Architectural style: Romanesque Revival
- MPS: Samuel Hannaford and Sons TR in Hamilton County
- NRHP reference No.: 80003054
- Added to NRHP: March 3, 1980

The former Nast Trinity United Methodist Church, now a campus of Hyde Park Community United Methodist Church, is a historic congregation of the United Methodist Church in Cincinnati, Ohio, United States. Designed by leading Cincinnati architect Samuel Hannaford and completed in 1880, it was the home of the first German Methodist church to be established anywhere in the world, and it was declared a historic site in the late twentieth century.

== Organic history ==
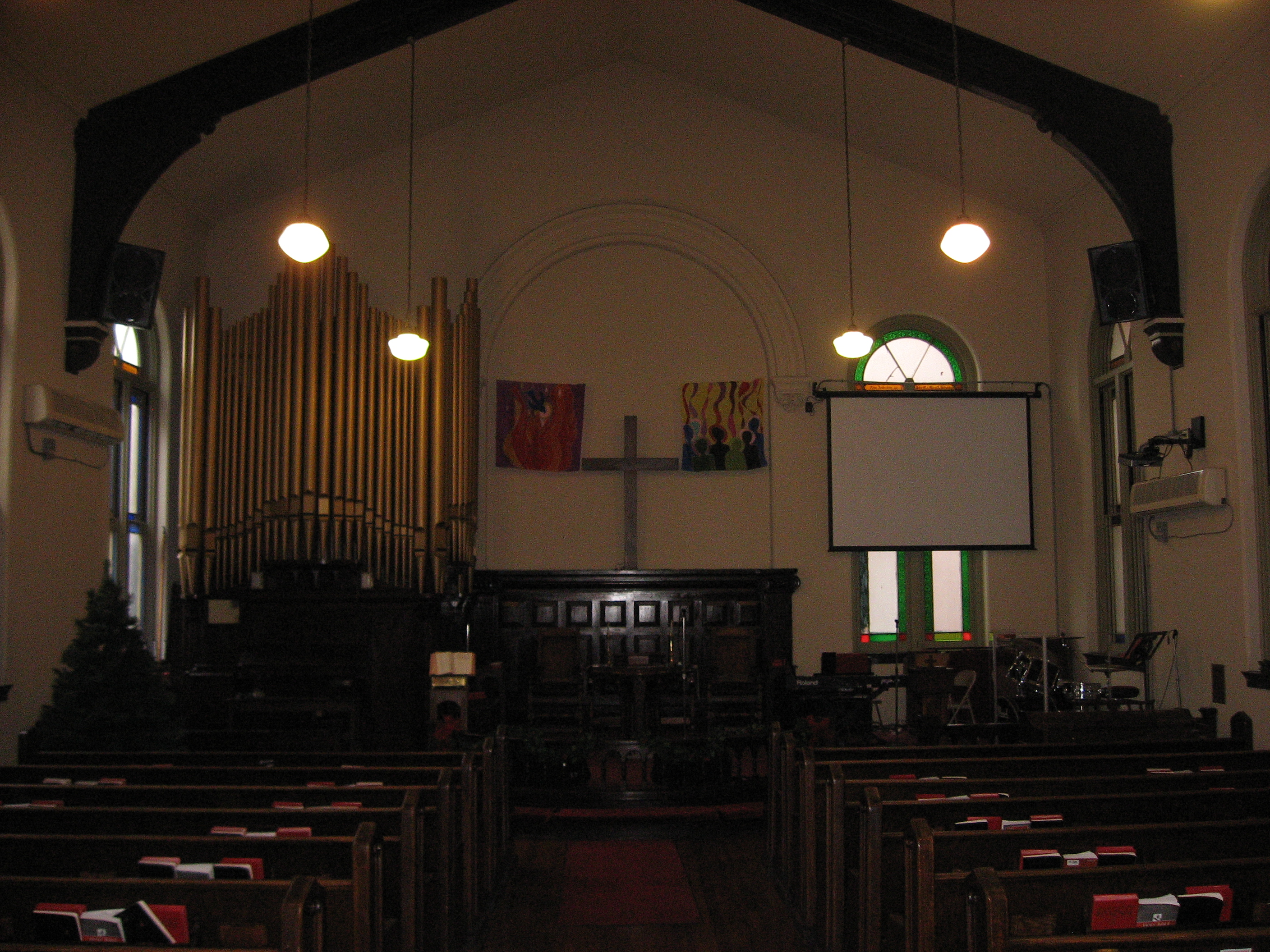
Sanctuary

Born in 1807 in the city of Stuttgart in Germany, William Nast immigrated to the United States at the age of twenty-one. After teaching at the United States Military Academy and at Kenyon College, he joined the Methodist Episcopal Church at the age of twenty-eight and was soon ordained to the Methodist ministry. Starting in Cincinnati in 1837, he began a process of organizing Methodist churches among German immigrants throughout the United States. Although the members of the new First German Methodist Episcopal Church originally worshipped in the nearby Wesley Chapel, they soon acquired the Race Street property on which the present church building is located. Eventually named Nast Methodist Church for its founder, the congregation merged with Trinity Methodist Church in 1958, and the two churches' names were mingled.

Trinity Methodist was older than Nast Methodist, having been established in 1835. Its founding members had come together from several older Methodist Episcopal churches in various parts of the city, including Wesley Chapel; because the denomination lacked churches in the city's downtown, a lot was purchased on Ninth Street and the Trinity congregation's building erected there. Over the years, Trinity was weakened multiple times by the establishment of several other congregations by some of its former members; more than half of its members left to found Walnut Hills Methodist Church in 1870, and the 1892 creation of Clifton Methodist Episcopal Church resulted in the departure of three-fourths of Trinity's leading members. By the middle of the twentieth century, the neighborhood surrounding Trinity's church building had become part of Cincinnati's central business district, and the congregation was continuing to shrink in both membership and money; as a result, it merged with Nast Methodist Church. Located on Ninth Street west of Race Street, the former Trinity Methodist Church building continues in existence to the present day.

== Architecture ==
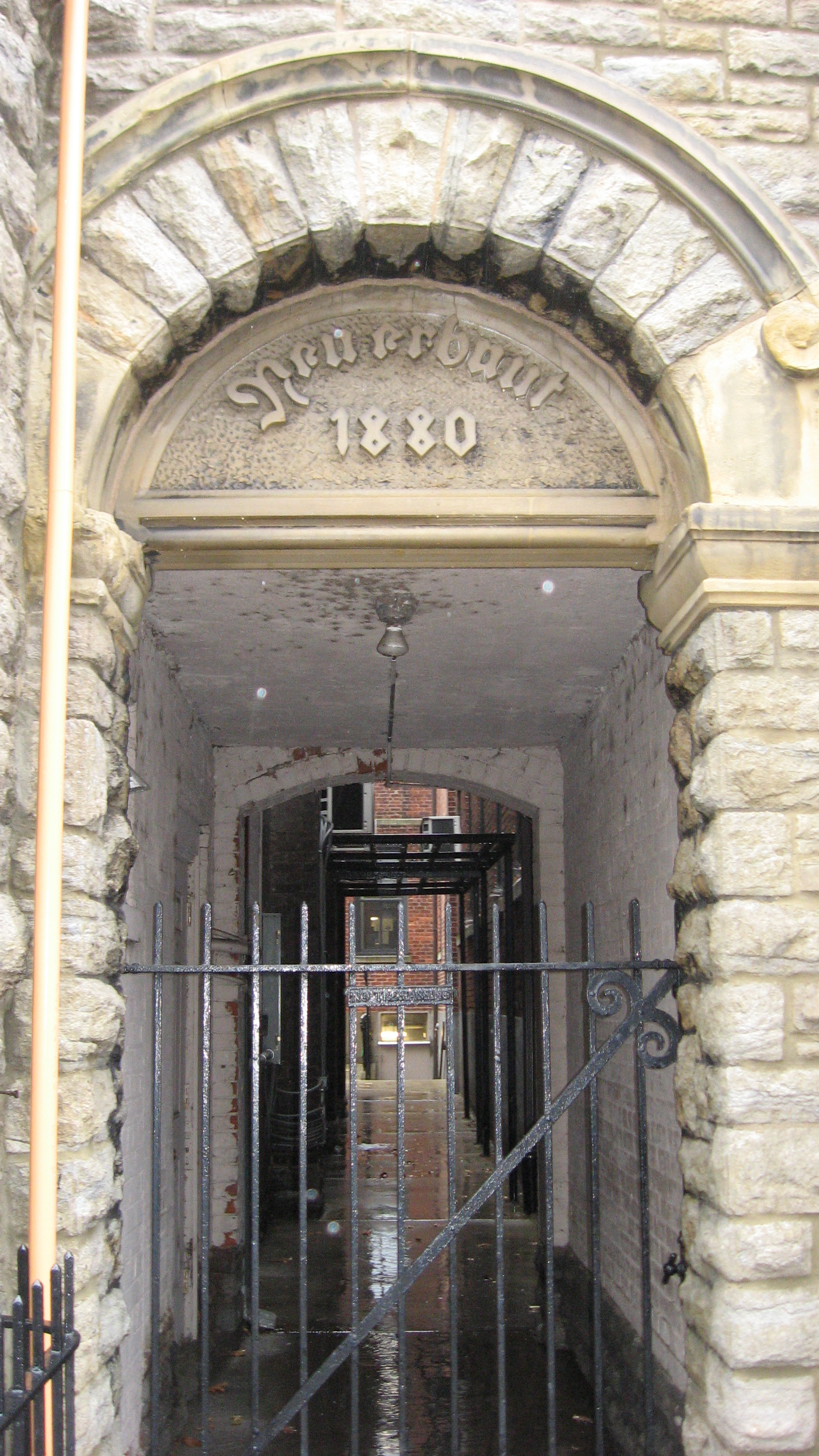
One of the small side entrances

Located in Cincinnati's Over-the-Rhine neighborhood, the church building is a stone structure with brick elements, built on a stone foundation and covered with a slate roof. Two-and-a-half stories tall, the church features a prominent front gable with a grand tympanum created in the Norman style. Numerous courses of undressed stone appear on the exterior, which is furthermore distinguished by a semi-Palladian window, an elaborate Romanesque Revival arch, multiple small circular windows, and small porches on both sides of the facade.

By choosing Samuel Hannaford (who was a member of the Winton Place Methodist Episcopal Church in the village of Winton Place) to design their new structure in 1881, Nast Methodist Episcopal Church selected one of Cincinnati's most prominent architects. Having completed the grand Cincinnati Music Hall in the 1870s, Hannaford was at the pinnacle of his career in the early 1880s. At this time, Cincinnati was experiencing significant growth, and Hannaford's services were in demand throughout the city and its suburbs. Many other churches in the region commissioned buildings from Hannaford during this period of his life; more than a dozen survive today, and nearly all of these structures feature walls of ashlar with undressed exteriors, like that of Nast Trinity. Conversely, few of these church buildings are designed in the conventional Romanesque Revival style of Nast Trinity; the majority are Gothic Revival buildings, and several others are examples of the Richardsonian Romanesque style. Such a variation in styles was not restricted to religious buildings; as popular tastes changed, Hannaford willingly employed a wide range of architectural styles in all types of buildings.

== Historic site ==
In recognition of its historically significant architecture, the National Park Service listed the former First German Methodist Episcopal Church on the National Register of Historic Places in 1980. It was part of a multiple property submission of structures designed by Samuel Hannaford in Cincinnati and the surrounding metropolitan area, which included thirteen different religious buildings and more than fifty buildings overall. Its designation as a historic site is particularly significant because of its religious nature, for churches and other religious properties are not typically considered eligible for inclusion on the Register.
