= Our Lady of Mercy High School (Ohio) =

- U.S. National Register of Historic Places
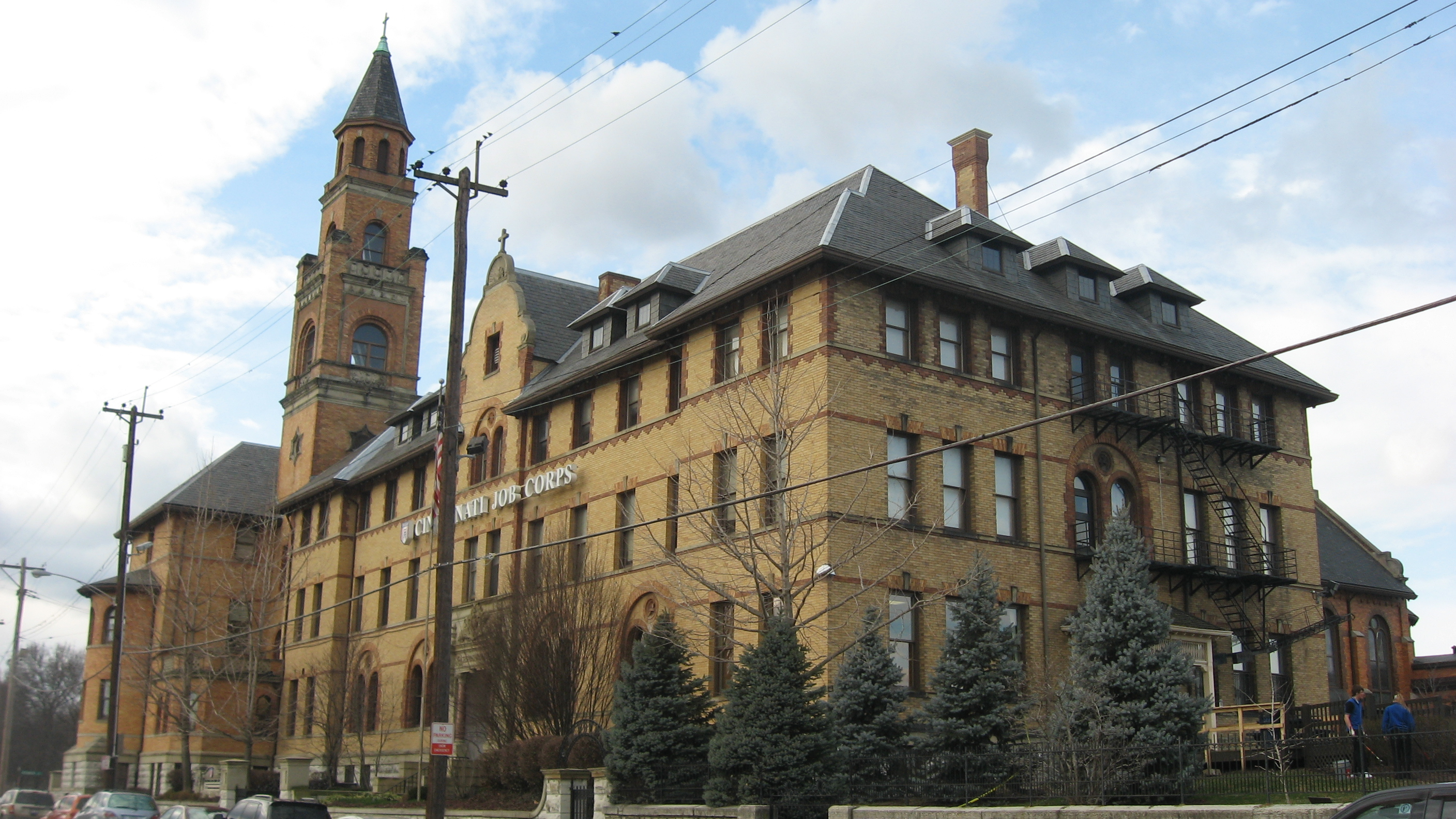
- Front and northern side

- Location within Ohio Location within the United States
- Location: Cincinnati, Ohio
- Coordinates: 39°6′37.80″N 84°31′55.60″W
- Architect: Samuel Hannaford & Sons
- MPS: Samuel Hannaford and Sons TR in Hamilton County
- NRHP reference No.: 80003070
- Added to NRHP: March 3, 1980

Our Lady of Mercy High School is a registered historic building in Cincinnati, Ohio, listed in the National Register on March 3, 1980. It was designed by Samuel Hannaford.

== Historic uses ==
The building has been Church School, Job Corps adult education school and a Job training school as of 1988.

== Location ==
1409 Western Ave. Cincinnati, Hamilton County, Ohio, United States 45214
