= George Balch House =

Historic house in Ohio, United States

- U.S. National Register of Historic Places
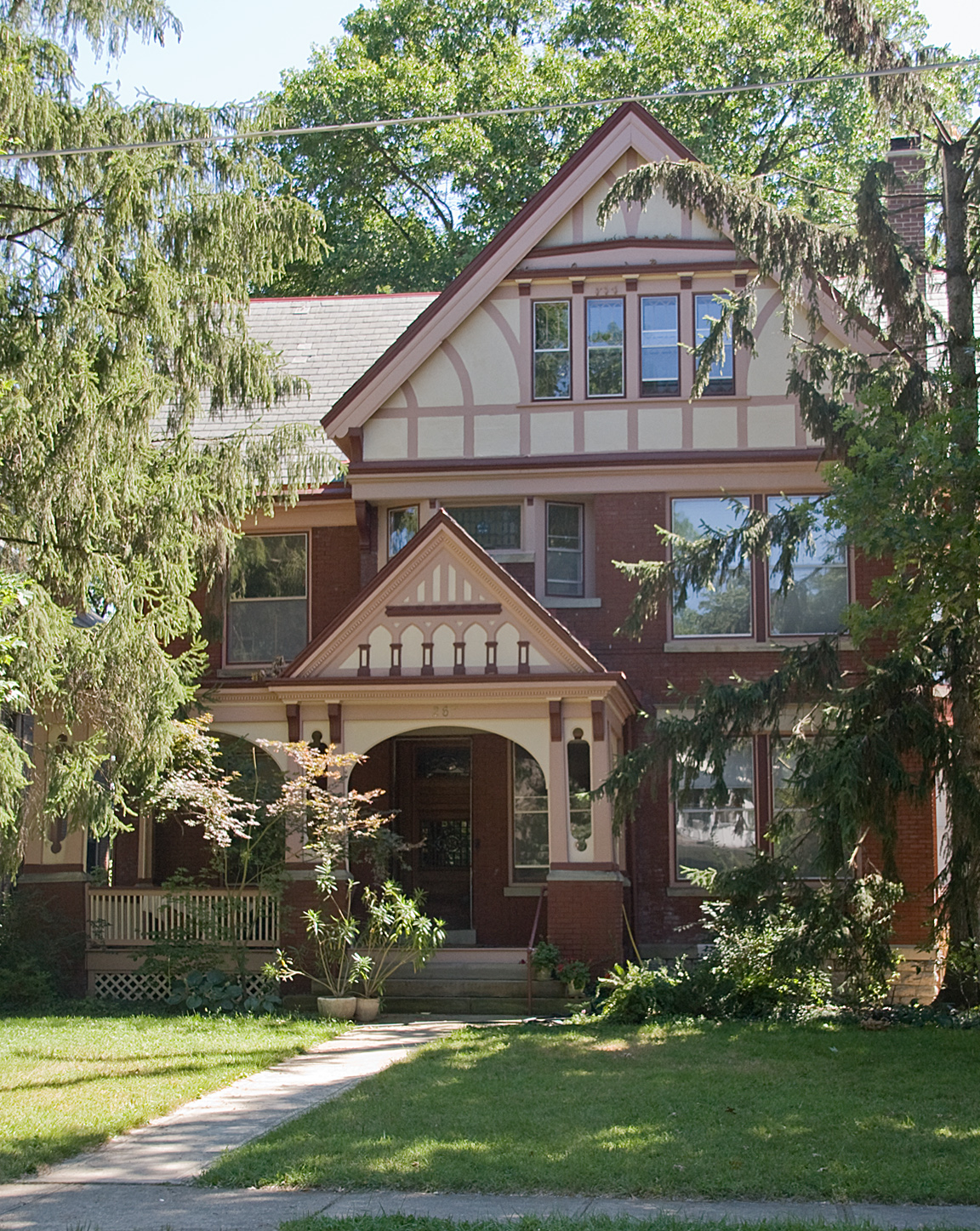
- Front of the house

- Location within Ohio Location within the United States
- Location: 267 Greendale Ave., Cincinnati, Ohio
- Coordinates: 39°9′4″N 84°31′4″W
- Area: Less than 1 acre (0.40 ha)
- Built: 1896
- Architect: Samuel Hannaford & Sons
- Architectural style: Queen Anne
- MPS: Samuel Hannaford and Sons TR in Hamilton County
- NRHP reference No.: 80003036
- Added to NRHP: March 3, 1980

The George Balch House is a historic house in Cincinnati, Ohio, United States. Located along Greendale Avenue in that city's Clifton neighborhood, it is a two-and-a-half-story building constructed primarily in the Queen Anne style of architecture.

In 1892, Cincinnati, Hamilton, and Dayton Railroad executive George Balch moved to Clifton. Four years later, deciding to construct a house for himself, he chose renowned Cincinnati architect Samuel Hannaford. Balch was one of many Clifton residents to commission designs from Hannaford: having built a reputation as one of Cincinnati's premier Gilded Age architects, Hannaford had designed large numbers of houses for the residents of upscale neighborhoods such as Clifton. The Balch House was one of Hannaford's last residences in the area, for he retired in 1897.

Built of brick and stucco on a stone foundation, the Balch House is covered by a slate roof. Among its distinctive architectural features is the large gable on the front, which rises above a large frame porch that rests on brick pedestals. Individuals can enter the house through an ornate entrance located under a decorated smaller gable, while a large gable similar to that of the front crowns the house's western side. The overall floor plan of the house is the shape of an "L".

In 1980, the George Balch House was listed on the National Register of Historic Places because of its well-preserved historic architecture. Dozens of other Cincinnati buildings were added to the Register at the same time as part of a multiple property submission of buildings designed by Hannaford.
