= Samuel Hannaford =

American architect (1835–1911)

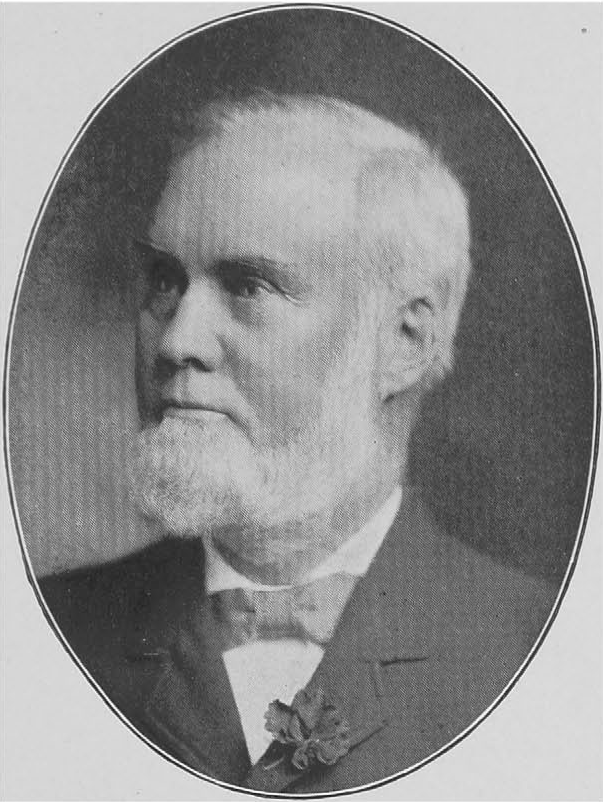
- Hannaford circa 1903
- Born: April 10, 1835; England
- Died: January 7, 1911 (aged 75); Cincinnati, Ohio, U.S.
- Education: Farmer's College
- Occupation: Architect
- Organization(s): Samuel Hannaford & Sons

Samuel Hannaford (April 10, 1835 – January 7, 1911) was an American architect based in Cincinnati, Ohio. Some of the best known landmarks in the city, such as Music Hall and City Hall, were of his design. The bulk of Hannaford's work was done locally, over 300 buildings, but his residential designs appear through New England to the Midwest and the South.

== Biography ==
Born in England, Hannaford immigrated with his family to Cincinnati at age nine.

Hannaford attended public schools and graduated from Farmer's College, Cincinnati, where he studied architecture. Hannaford opened an office in 1857 and in 1887 formed the firm of Samuel Hannaford & Sons. At the time of his death, he was director of the Ohio Mechanics' Institute. Hannaford died in his home in Cincinnati on 7 January 1911.

== List of works ==
This list includes works by Samuel Hannaford and, after 1904, works by his firm Samuel Hannaford and Sons.

=== Cincinnati ===
- Northside Methodist Church (1893)
- Our Lady of Mercy High School (1897)
- George Balch House (1896)
- Cuvier Press Club Building (1862–63)
- Samuel Hannaford House (1865)
- Cincinnati Workhouse (1869, demolished 1990)
- St. George's Church (1872)
- Cincinnati Observatory (1873)
- Alms and Doepke Dry Goods Company (1878)
- Music Hall (1878)
- Nast Trinity United Methodist Church (1880)
- Cincinnatian Hotel (1882)
- Salem United Methodist Church (1882)
- Elsinore Arch (1883)
- Hoffner Masonic Lodge (1886)
- Winton Place Methodist Episcopal Church (1885, and parsonage in 1888)
- Lombardy Apartment Building (1885)
- Ohio National Guard Armory (1886, demolished)
- Eden Park Station No. 7 (1889)
- Wyoming Presbyterian Church (1890)
- Cincinnati Odd Fellows Temple (1891?)
- Phoenix Building/Cincinnati Club (1893)
- Cincinnati City Hall (1893)
- Ransley Apartment Building (1895)
- Hooper Building (1896)
- Eden Park Stand Pipe (1894)
- Price Hill Masonic Lodge#524 (1877)
- Van Wormer Library at the University of Cincinnati (1901)
- Hyde Park School at the corner of Edwards and Observatory Roads (1903)
- Carnegie Library (1905 - 1906) at 3738 Eastern Avenue in Cincinnati
- Emery Theatre (1912)
- H.&S. Pogue Company Department Store (1916)
- Hoffman Elementary School (1922)
- Cincinnati Times-Star Building (1933)
- Westwood Methodist Church (listed in the National Heritage Register, 1974) D. Meinken & Sons General Contractor
- multiple houses in the Winton Place, Cincinnati residential district
- John E. Bell Residence 306 McMillan Street. Cincinnati, O; 1881–1882- Destroyed.
- Mary A. Wolfe House
- George B. Cox House, one-time home to renowned Cincinnati political boss George Barnsdale Cox, and later the longtime home to the Pi Kappa Alpha fraternity at the University of Cincinnati. Parkview Manor became the Clifton Branch of the Cincinnati Public Library system in 2015.
- The Mutual Building, Covington, KY

=== Miscellaneous ===
- Waldo Building (1893)
- Colonel Joseph Taylor House (1878)
- Vigo County Courthouse (1888)
- Sorg Opera House Middletown, OH (1891)
- Terre Haute Union Station (1893)
- Greene County Courthouse (1902)
- Washington County Courthouse (1902)
- Monroe County Courthouse (1905)

== Samuel Hannaford and Sons Thematic Resources ==
A 1978 study titled "Samuel Hannaford and Sons Thematic Resources in Hamilton County" was conducted which identified numerous Hannaford buildings for potential listing in the U.S. National Register of Historic Places. This led to numerous actual listings of Hamilton County properties designed by the Hannafords.

== Gallery ==
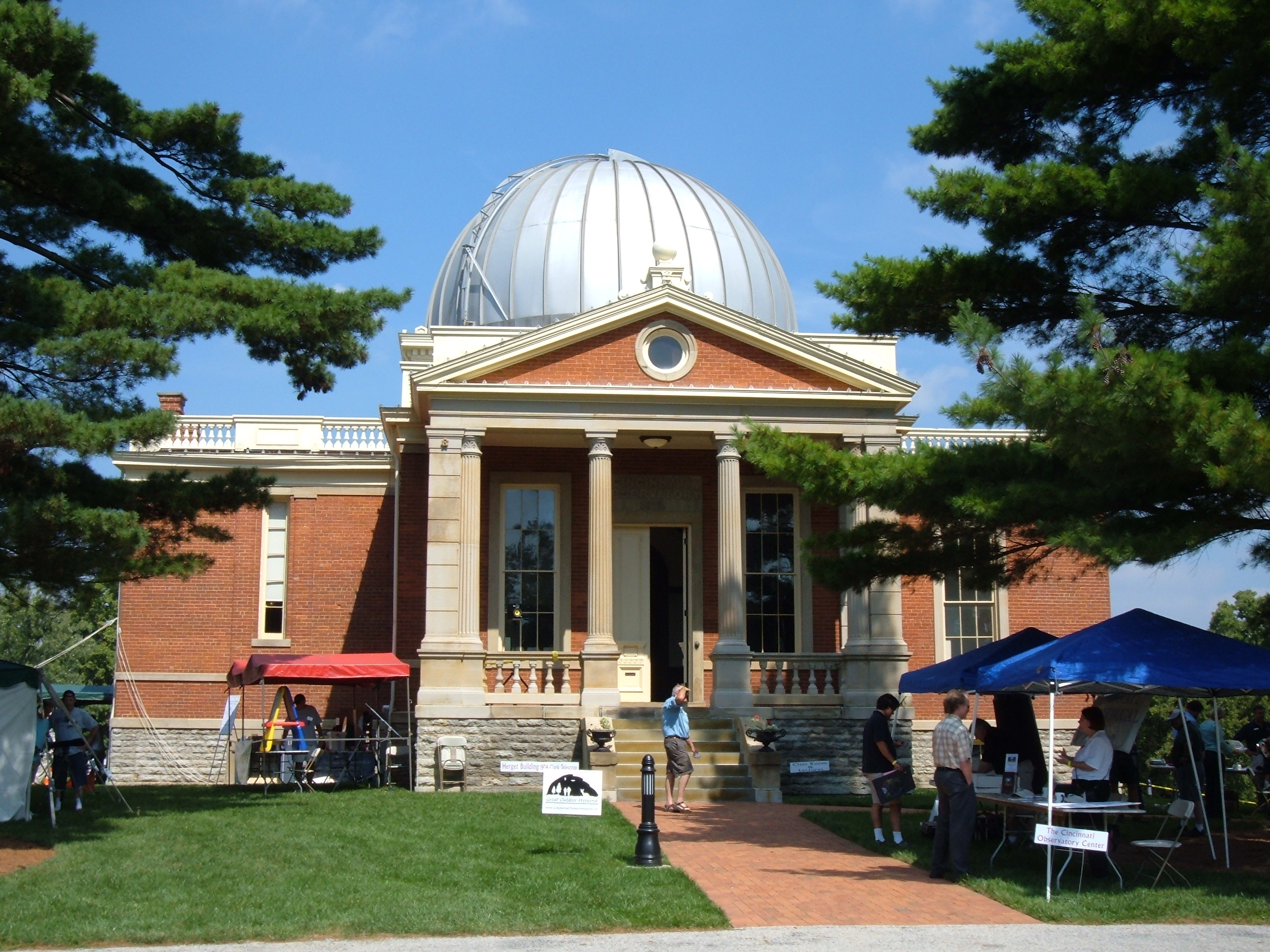
Cincinnati Observatory, 1873

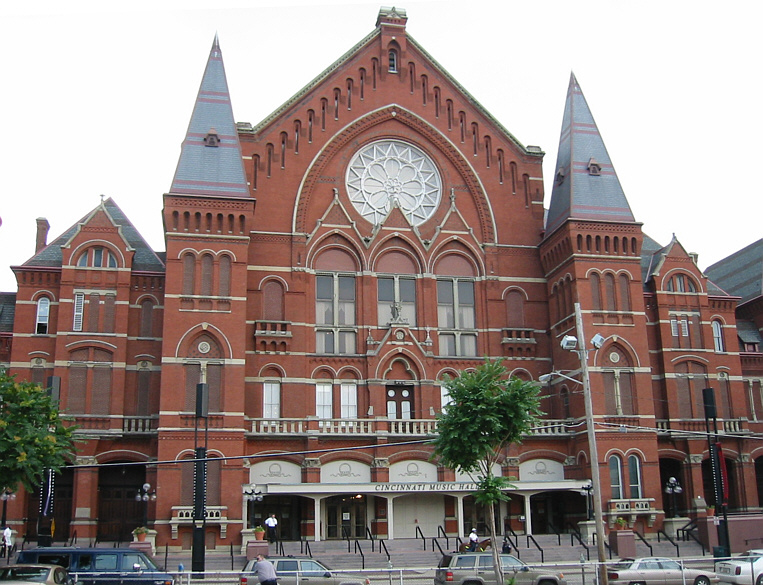
Music Hall (Cincinnati), 1878

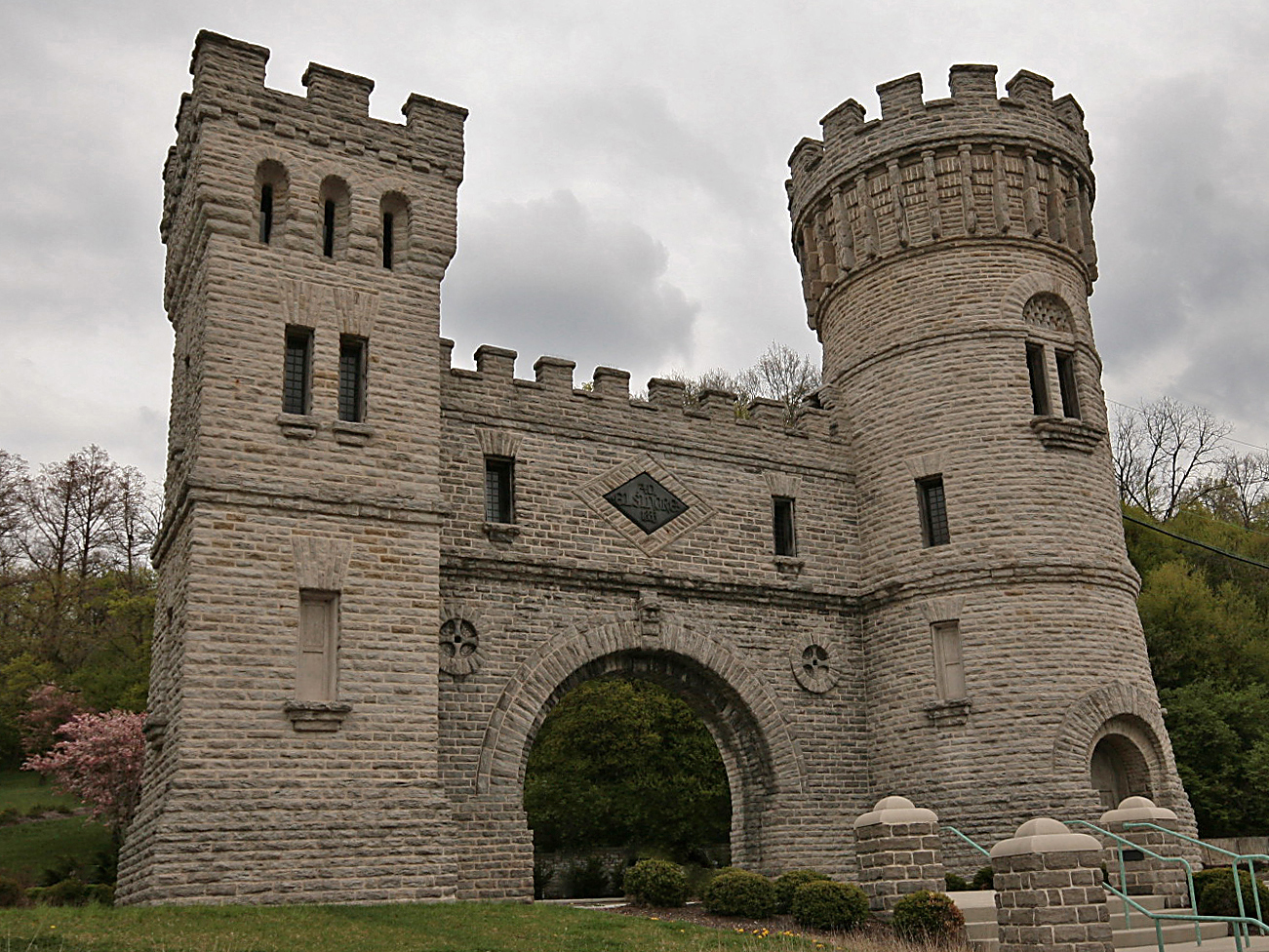
Elsinore Arch, 1883

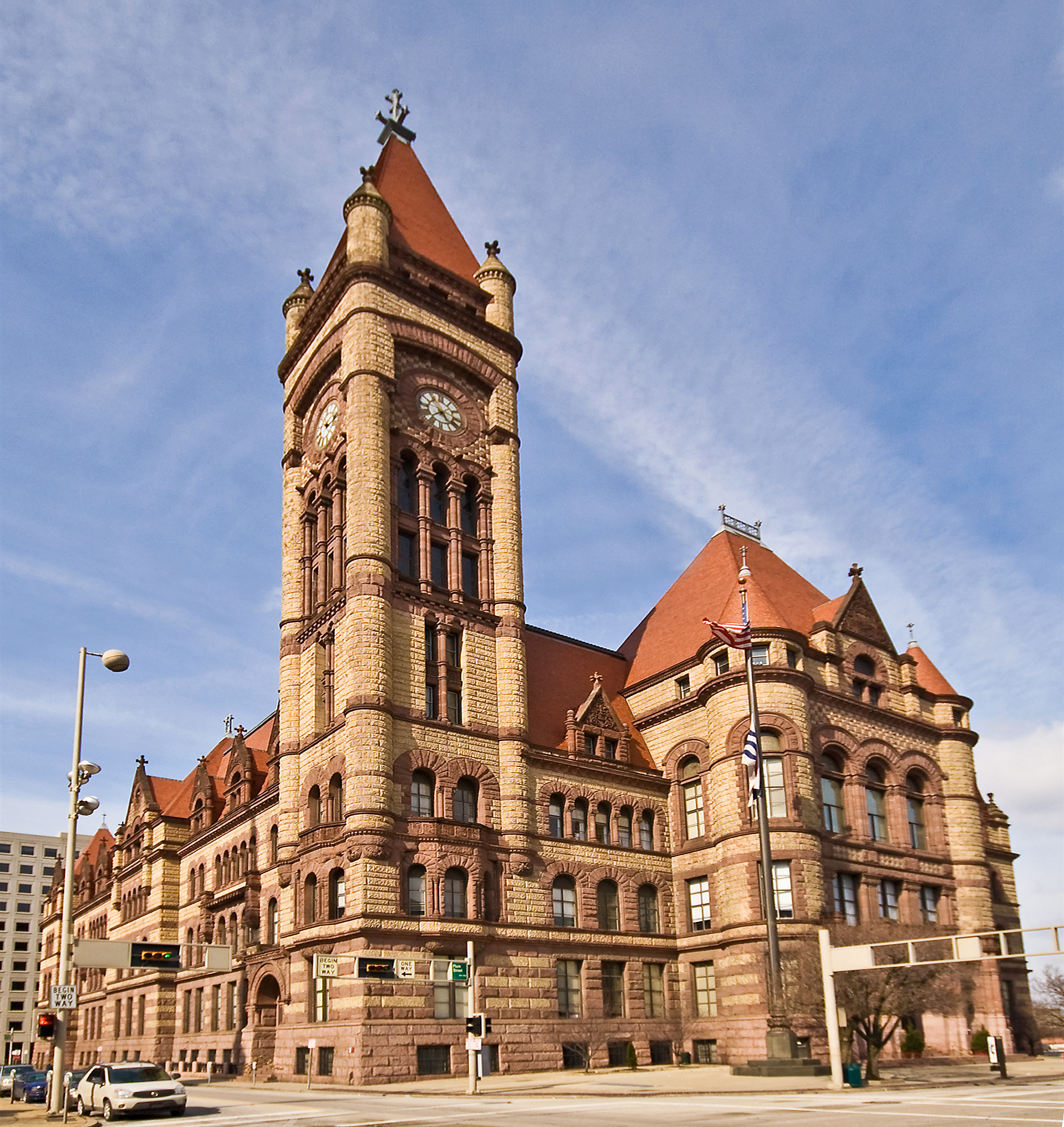
Cincinnati City Hall, built 1888–1893

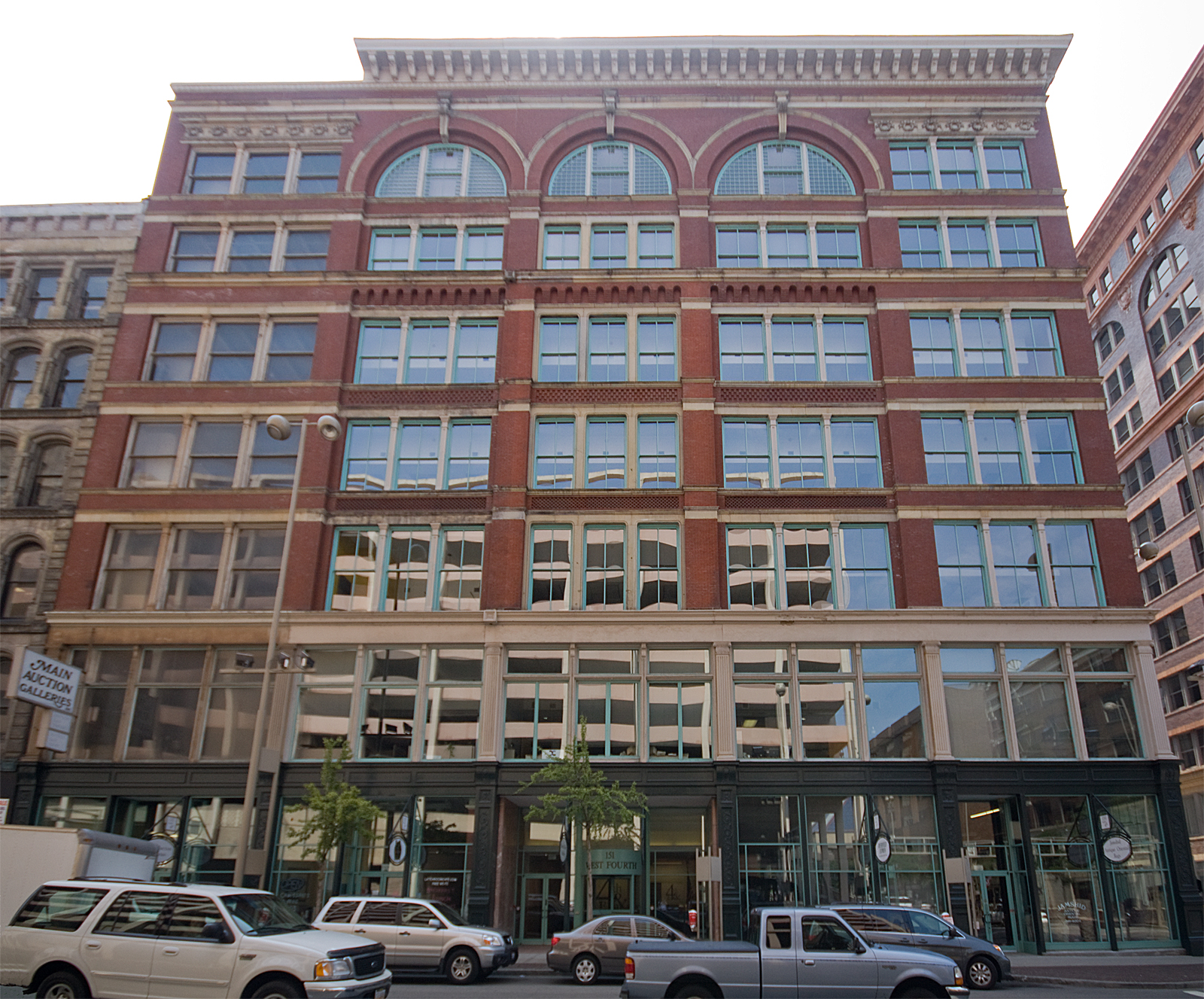
Hooper Building, 1893

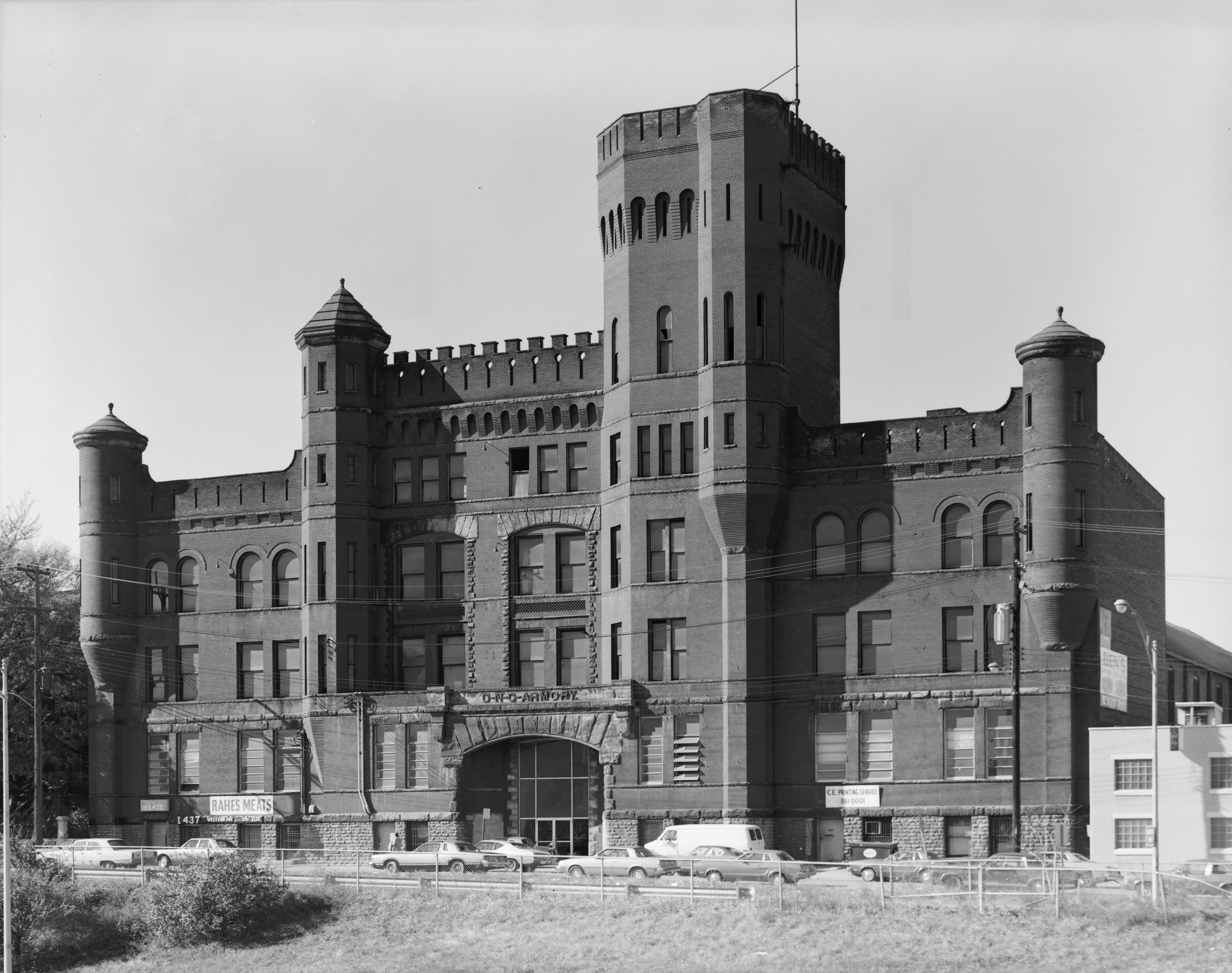
Ohio National Guard Armory

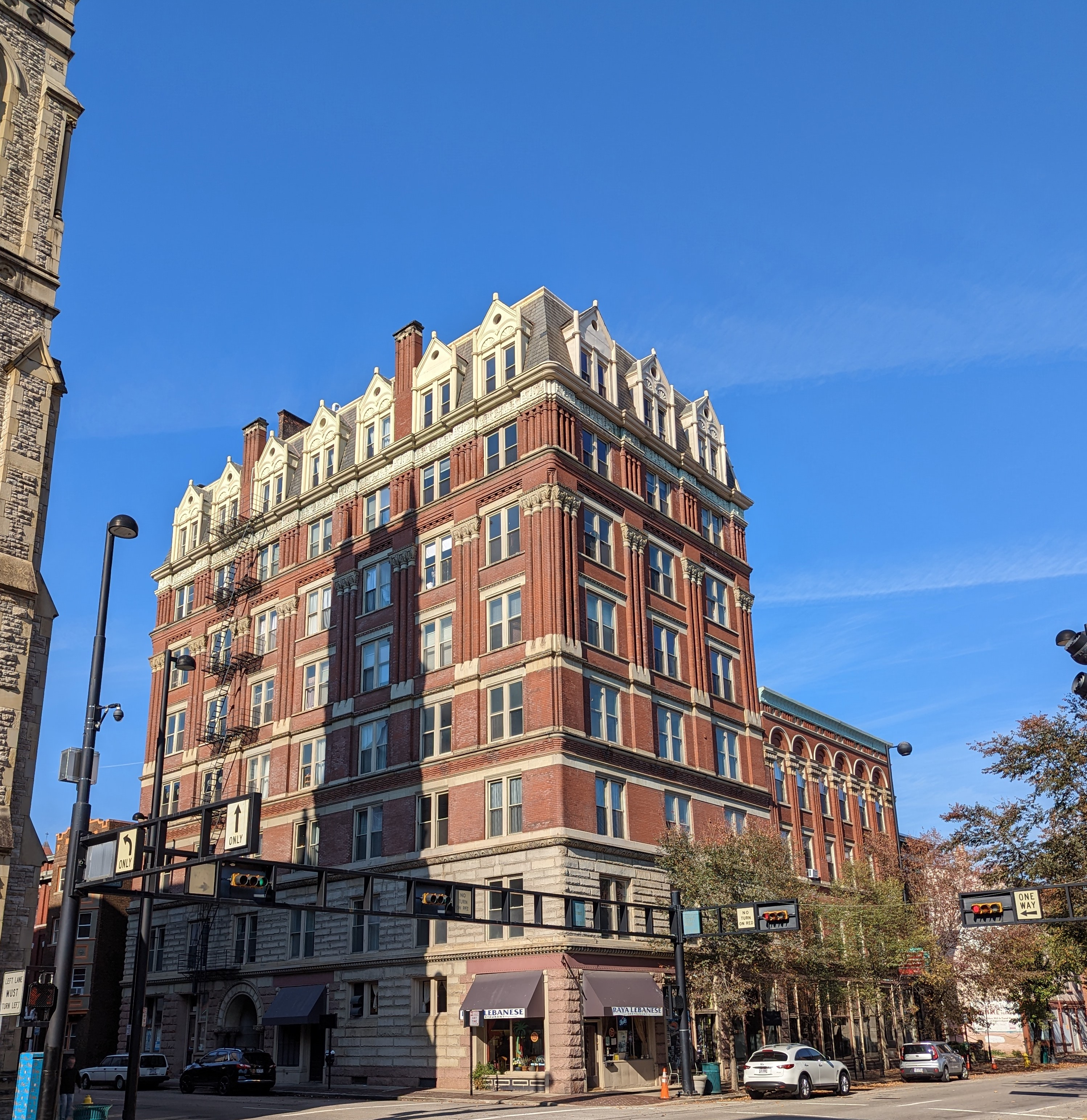
The Waldo Building, 1893
