= Van Wormer Library =

Coordinates: 39°07′51″N 84°31′09″W

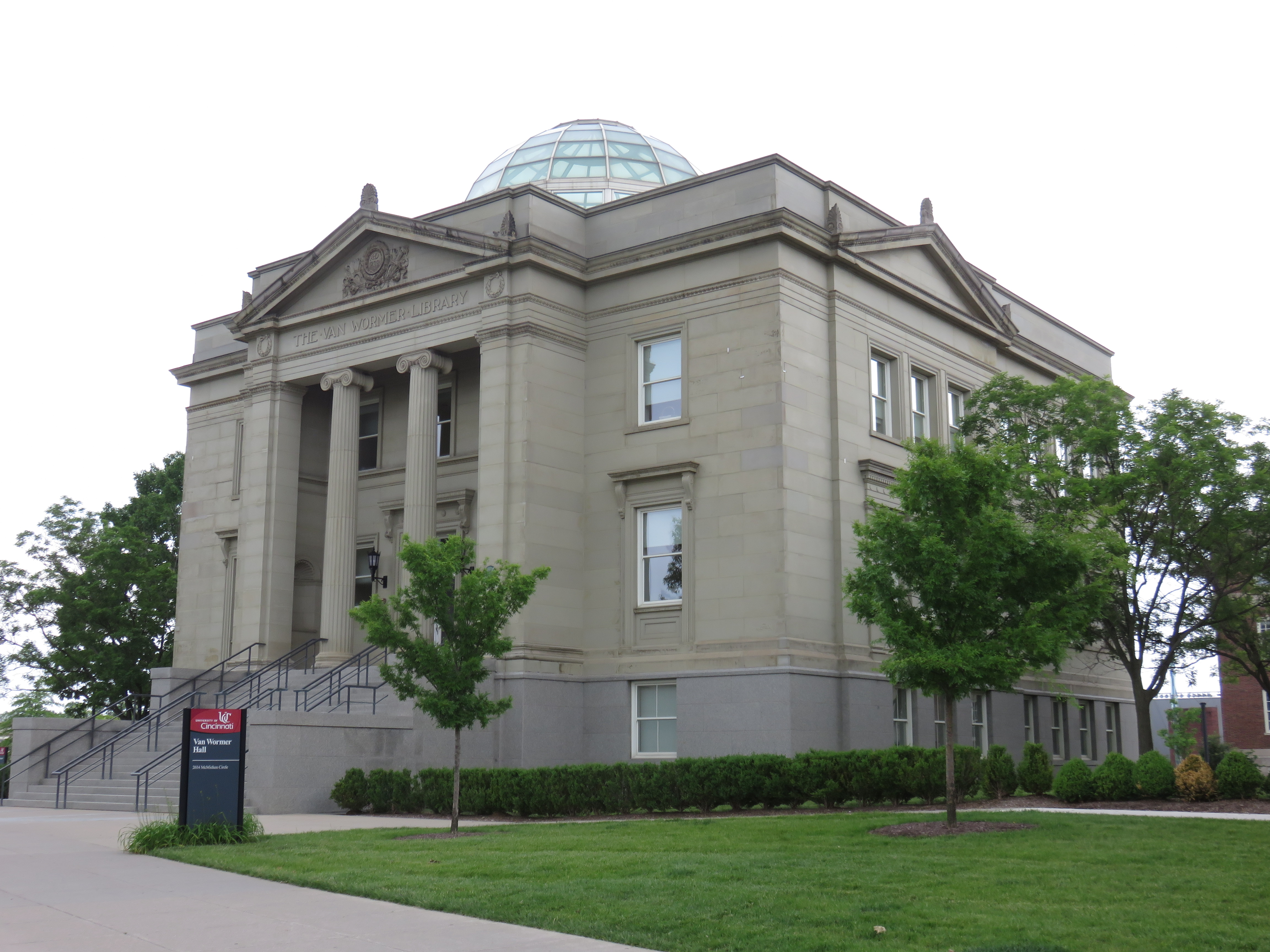
The library in 2017

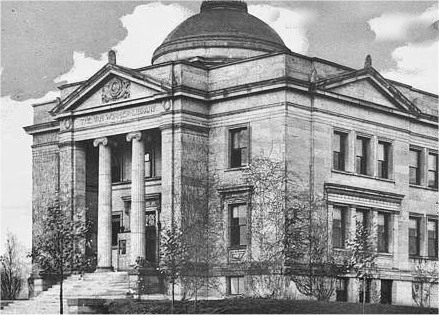
Historical image of the library

Van Wormer Library, part of the University of Cincinnati campus, is a classical architecture-style library building designed by Samuel Hannaford in 1899, and opened on May 1, 1901. Funding was provided by Asa Van Wormer with $50,000 worth of street railroad capital stock in memory of his late wife, who died October 4, 1878.

== Renovation ==
In 2006, a $10.7 million renovation was undertaken, creating a new dome and improving lighting. Prior to the renovation the dome provided natural light on the top floor only, but now all floors benefit from it. Van Wormer is no longer a library; university administrative offices are now housed in the building.
