= Samuel Hannaford House =

Historic house in Ohio, United States

- U.S. National Register of Historic Places
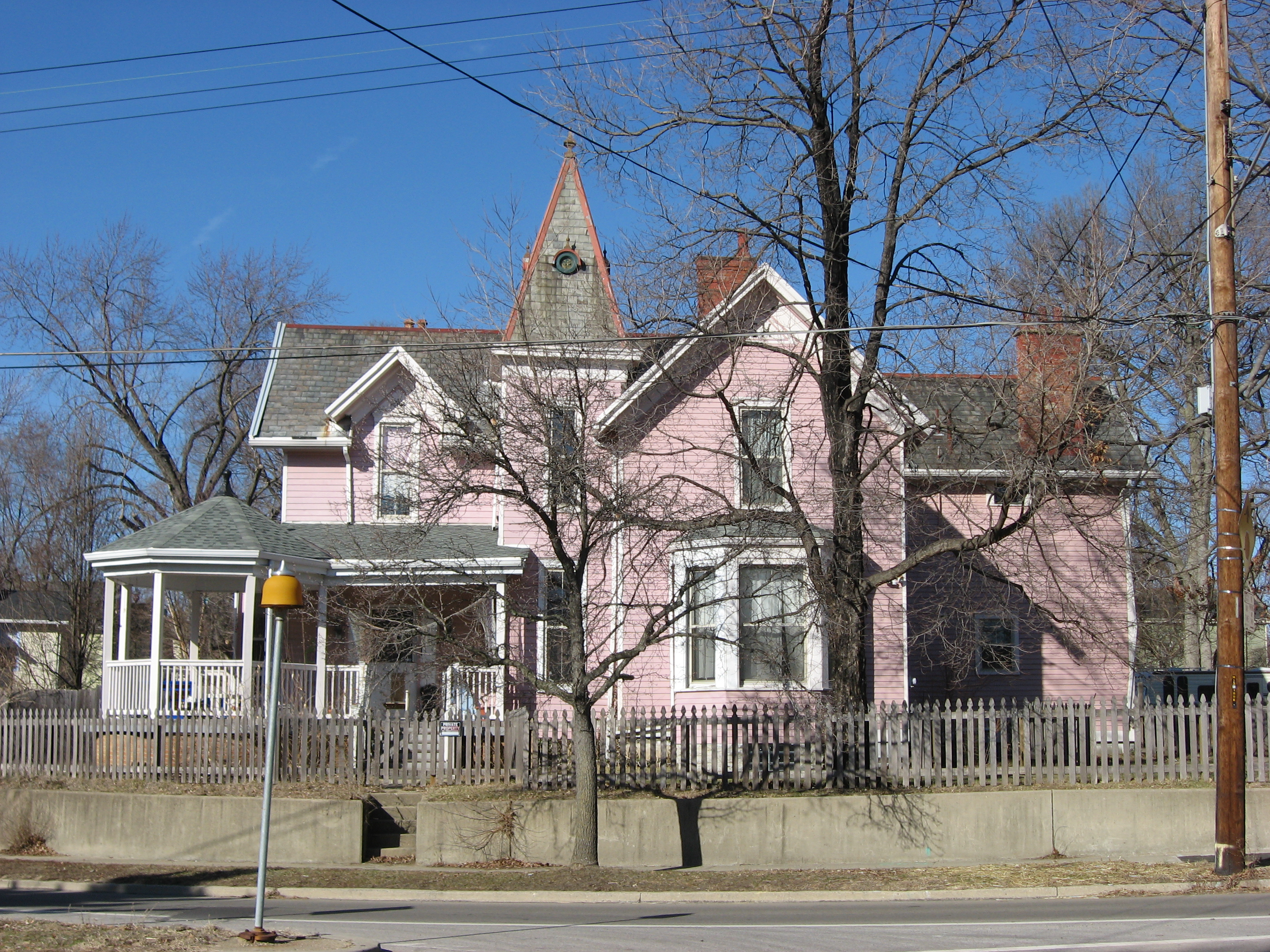
- Front of the house
- Location: 768 Derby Avenue, Cincinnati, Ohio
- Coordinates: 39°10′16″N 84°31′05″W
- Architect: Samuel Hannaford
- Architectural style: Late Victorian
- MPS: Samuel Hannaford and Sons TR in Hamilton County
- NRHP reference No.: 80003056
- Added to NRHP: March 3, 1980

Samuel Hannaford House is a registered historic building located at 768 Derby Avenue in Spring Grove Village, Cincinnati, Ohio. It was listed in the National Register on March 3, 1980.

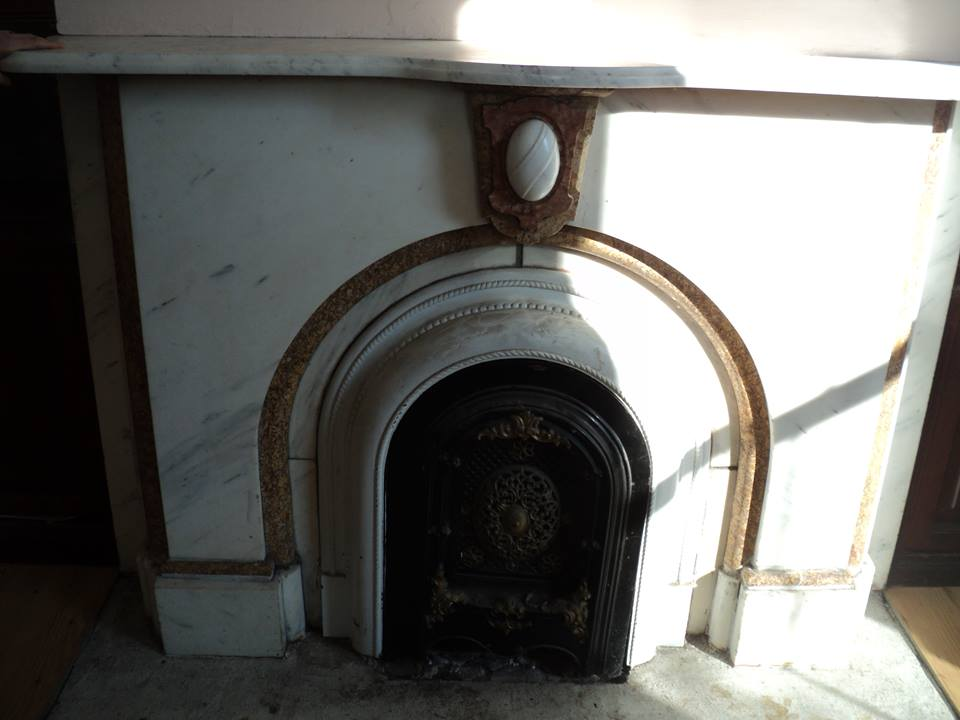
Mantle in a room of the home
