= Winton Place Methodist Episcopal Church =

- U.S. National Register of Historic Places
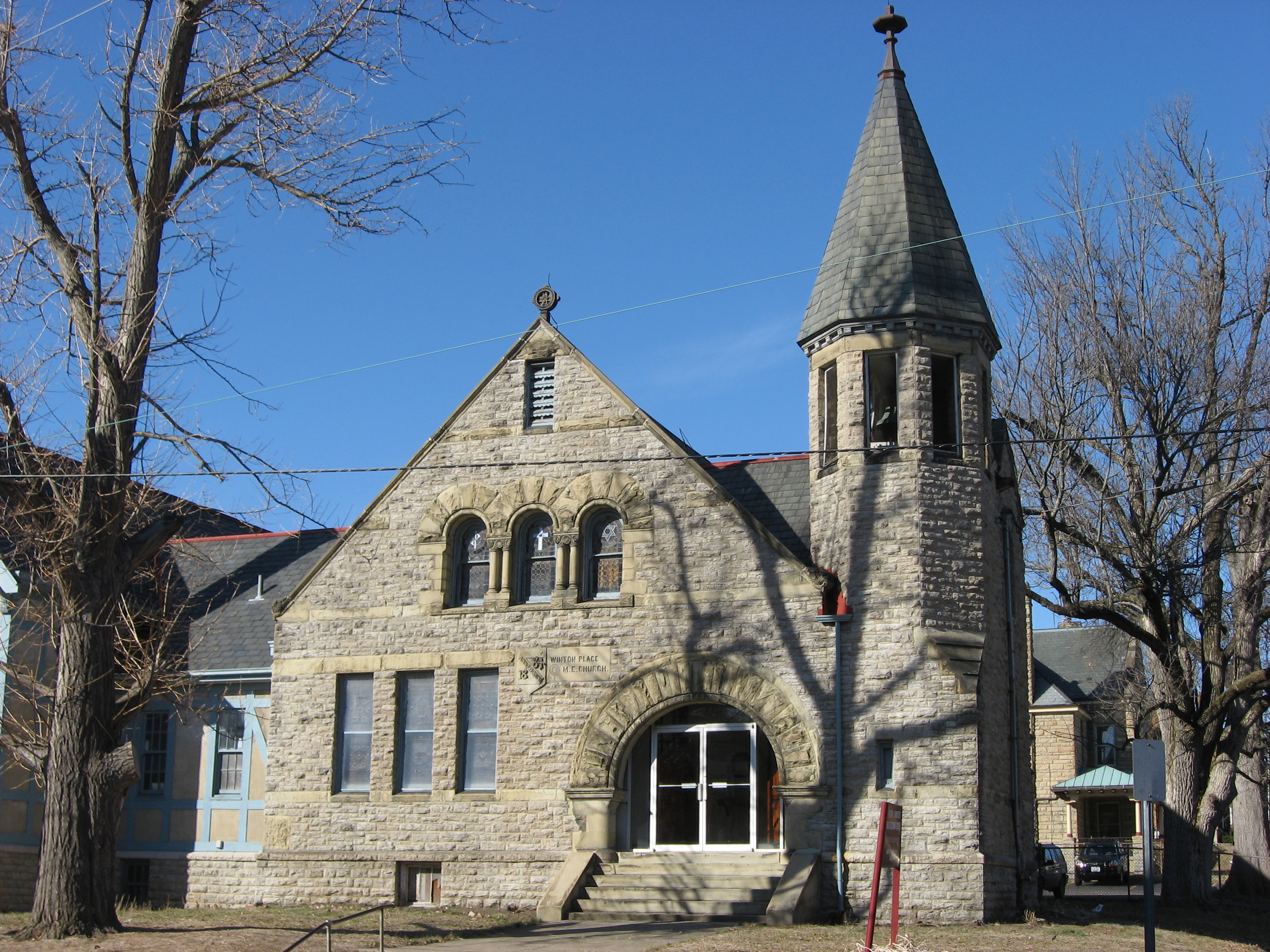
- Front of the church

- Location within Ohio Location within the United States
- Location: 700 E. Epworth Ave., Cincinnati, Ohio
- Coordinates: 39°10′24″N 84°30′59″W
- Area: Less than 1 acre (0.40 ha)
- Built: 1884
- Architect: Samuel Hannaford
- Architectural style: Romanesque Revival
- MPS: Samuel Hannaford and Sons TR in Hamilton County
- NRHP reference No.: 80003091
- Added to NRHP: March 3, 1980

The Winton Place Methodist Episcopal Church is a historic church building in the Winton Place neighborhood of Cincinnati, Ohio, United States, that was constructed as the home of a congregation of the Methodist Episcopal Church in the late nineteenth century. The congregation grew out of a group that was founded in 1856; although the members erected their first building in 1860, they were not officially organized until 1872. Among the leading members of the congregation was Samuel Hannaford, a prominent Cincinnati architect. When the congregation chose to build a new church building in 1884, Hannaford was chosen as the architect for the project. At this time, Hannaford was near to the peak of his prestige: he had ended a partnership with another architect seven years before, and his reputation was growing with his designs of significant Cincinnati-area buildings such as the Cincinnati Music Hall.

Hannaford's design was a stone building, one-and-one-half stories tall; its foundation is constructed of limestone, laid in ashlar blocks, while its roof is composed of slates. It is predominantly a Romanesque Revival structure, with certain elements that resemble the Richardsonian Romanesque style. Among the most distinctive elements of its facade is a large Romanesque Revival arch above the entrance. Other Romanesque Revival details include three arcaded windows with columns, plus a large octagonal tower on the southeastern corner of the building, which features a belfry, narrow windows, and a steep slate roof.

Two of the most important events in the history of this church building occurred after Hannaford's death. Soon after he died on January 7, 1911, his funeral was held in the church, and thirteen years later, the building was expanded.

Early in March 1980, the Winton Place Methodist Episcopal Church was listed on the National Register of Historic Places. Seven other Cincinnati-area church buildings designed by Hannaford, as well as dozens of other structures in the city, were listed on the National Register at the same time as part of a multiple property submission. Today, the church building is no longer used by any congregation of the large United Methodist Church: it is now the home of the Winton Community Free Methodist Church.
