= Cincinnati City Hall =

Seat of government of Cincinnati, Ohio

- U.S. National Register of Historic Places
- Cincinnati Local Historic Landmark
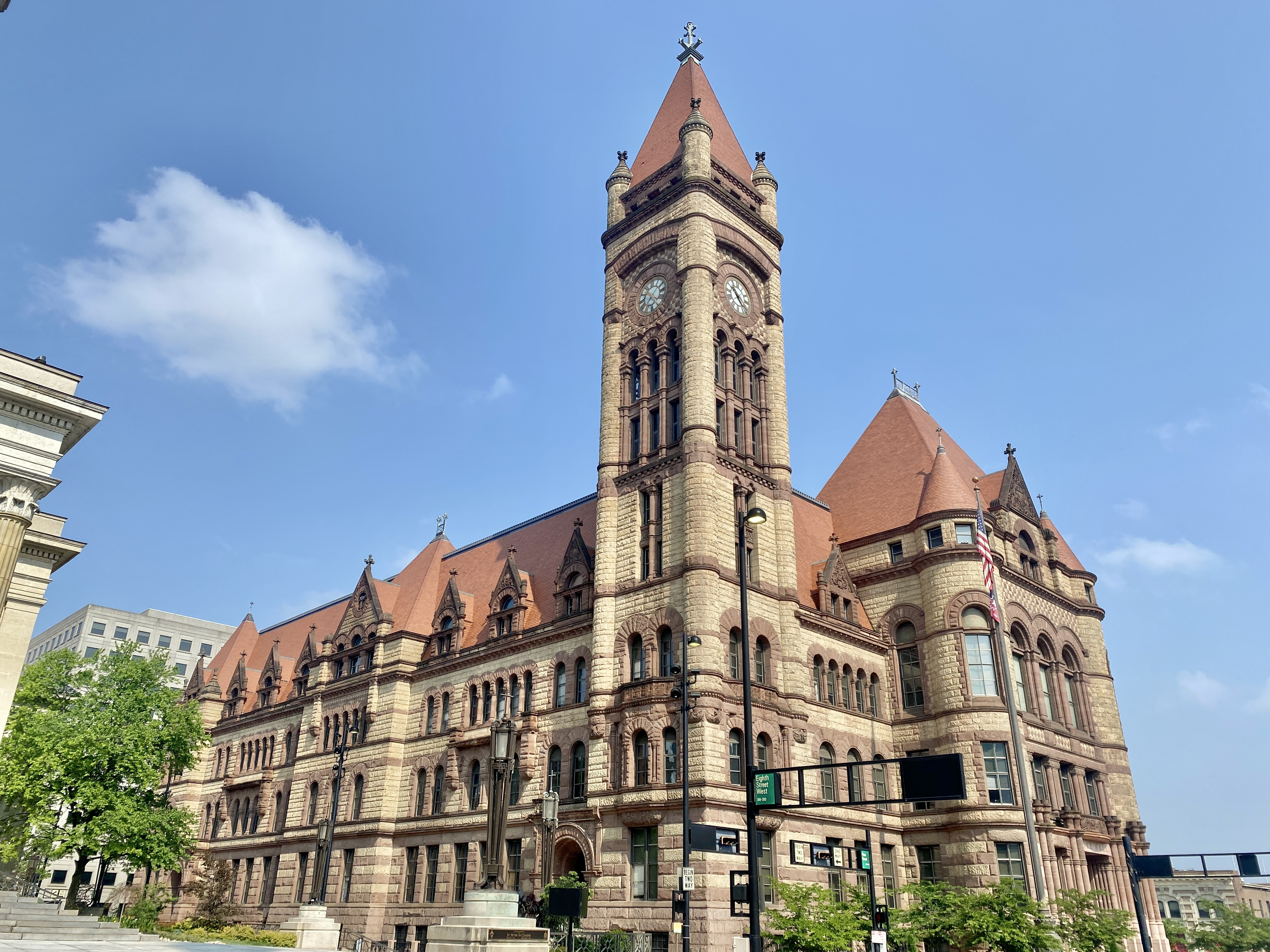
- Location: Cincinnati, Ohio
- Coordinates: 39°06′16″N 84°31′08″W
- Built: 1888–1893
- Architect: Samuel Hannaford
- Architectural style: Richardsonian Romanesque
- NRHP reference No.: 72001017
- Added to NRHP: December 11, 1972

Cincinnati City Hall is the seat of the municipal government of Cincinnati, Ohio. Completed in 1893, the Richardsonian Romanesque structure was listed in the National Register of Historic Places on December 11, 1972. The building was designed by Samuel Hannaford at a cost of $1.61 million.

The main building comprises four and a half stories with a nine-story clock tower. The building was constructed by the David Hummel company of Cincinnati using stone quarried in Wisconsin, Ohio, Missouri, and Indiana. Marble stairways and wainscoting originated in Italy and Tennessee, while granite columns were obtained from Vermont. Stained glass windows were installed which depict Cincinnatus and illustrate Cincinnati's early history.

The first city hall was built on this site in 1852 and was demolished in 1888 to make way for the current structure. Construction costs for the building totaled $1.61 million of which $54,000 was paid to Samuel Hannaford as architect and construction superintendent.

"Cincinnati's City Hall represents the prevailing architectural tastes at the time of its construction and the influence of H. H. Richardson on its designer, Samuel Hannaford. Richardson's winning design for the Cincinnati Chamber of Commerce building was executed in the 1880s; however, the building's demolition in 1911 left City Hall the best remaining example of Richardson Romanesque in Cincinnati. Samuel Hannaford practiced from 1858 until 1897 and made a significant contribution to the architectural heritage of the Cincinnati area."

An optical trick known as forced perspective makes the building appear even larger than it actually is. As it becomes taller, its windows get smaller.
