= National Register of Historic Places listings in western Cincinnati =

This is a list of the National Register of Historic Places listings in western Cincinnati, Ohio.

This is intended to be a complete list of the properties and districts on the National Register of Historic Places in western Cincinnati, Ohio, United States. Western Cincinnati is defined as being all of the city outside of downtown and west of Vine Street. The locations of National Register properties and districts may be seen in an online map.

There are 297 properties and districts listed on the National Register in Cincinnati, including 12 National Historic Landmarks. Western Cincinnati includes 99 of these properties and districts, including 3 National Historic Landmarks; the city's remaining properties and districts are listed elsewhere. Another 2 properties in western Cincinnati were once listed but have been removed.

This National Park Service list is complete through NPS recent listings posted August 21, 2026.

== Current listings ==
	Name on the Register	Image	Date listed	Location	Description
1	American Can Company Building	American Can Company Building	October 17, 2007 (#07001092)	4101 Spring Grove Ave. 39°09′37″N 84°32′14″W	Historic former factory built in 1921 where can-making machines were manufactured. Now loft-style apartments.
2	Anderson Ferry	Anderson Ferry	June 10, 1982 (#82003575)	Off U.S. Route 50; 39°04′35″N 84°37′28″W	
3	Apostolic Bethlehem Temple Church	Apostolic Bethlehem Temple Church	April 11, 1973 (#73001453)	1205 Elm St. 39°06′29″N 84°31′07″W	
4	B&O Freight Terminal	B&O Freight Terminal	December 29, 1986 (#86003521)	700 Pete Rose Way; 39°05′44″N 84°31′28″W	
5	Balch House	Balch House	March 3, 1980 (#80003036)	267 Greendale Ave. 39°09′04″N 84°31′04″W	Queen Anne style house built in 1896, designed by Cincinnati architect Samuel Hannaford for Cincinnati, Hamilton, and Dayton Railroad executive George Balch.
6	Beech Avenue Houses	Beech Avenue Houses	February 16, 1979 (#79001853)	1120 and 1128 Beech Ave. 39°06′46″N 84°34′38″W	
7	Betts-Longworth Historic District	Betts-Longworth Historic District	November 29, 1983 (#83004304)	Roughly bounded by Ezzard Charles Dr., Central Ave., and Mound and Old Court Sts. 39°06′26″N 84°31′21″W	
8	Cedric G. and Patricia Neils Boulter House	Cedric G. and Patricia Neils Boulter House	May 14, 1999 (#99000512)	1 Rawson Woods Circle; 39°09′06″N 84°31′24″W	Designed by Frank Lloyd Wright.
9	Frederick E. and Catherine Bullerdick House	Frederick E. and Catherine Bullerdick House	December 20, 2007 (#07001295)	4321 Hamilton Ave. 39°09′58″N 84°32′29″W	
10	Calvary Episcopal Church Sunday School	Calvary Episcopal Church Sunday School	March 3, 1980 (#80003040)	3770 Clifton Ave. 39°09′08″N 84°31′03″W	
11	Freeman Grant Cary Pleasant Hill Academy	Freeman Grant Cary Pleasant Hill Academy	April 29, 1999 (#99000511)	5651 Hamilton Ave. 39°11′39″N 84°32′46″W	
12	Cincinnati Music Hall	Cincinnati Music Hall	January 26, 1970 (#70000496)	1243 Elm St. 39°06′34″N 84°31′08″W	
13	Cincinnati Street Gas Lamps	Cincinnati Street Gas Lamps	December 22, 1978 (#78002073)	1109 street lamps at various locations throughout Cincinnati	
14	Cincinnati Union Terminal	Cincinnati Union Terminal	October 31, 1972 (#72001018)	1301 Western Ave. 39°06′36″N 84°32′16″W	
15	Cincinnati Work House and Hospital	Cincinnati Work House and Hospital	March 3, 1980 (#80003044)	3208 Colerain Ave. 39°08′32″N 84°32′13″W	
16	Clifton Avenue Historic District	Clifton Avenue Historic District	December 8, 1978 (#78002074)	Irregular pattern along Clifton Ave. 39°09′18″N 84°31′01″W	
17	Clifton Methodist Episcopal Church	Clifton Methodist Episcopal Church	April 12, 2007 (#07000297)	3418 Clifton Ave. 39°08′39″N 84°31′07″W	
18	College Hill Town Hall	College Hill Town Hall	March 17, 1978 (#78002075)	Belmont Ave. and Larch St. 39°11′37″N 84°32′59″W	
19	Cote Bonneville	Cote Bonneville	November 29, 1984 (#84000448)	4850 Colerain Ave. 39°10′13″N 84°33′21″W	
20	George B. Cox House	George B. Cox House	November 6, 1973 (#73001456)	Brookline and Jefferson Aves. 39°08′33″N 84°30′54″W	Home to "Boss" Cox, Cincinnati political leader. Designed by Samuel Hannaford.
21	Crosley Building	Crosley Building	February 24, 2015 (#15000042)	1329-1333 Arlington St. 39°08′42″N 84°32′24″W	
22	Dayton Street Historic District	Dayton Street Historic District	January 25, 1973 (#73001457)	Roughly bounded by Bank, Linn, and Poplar Sts. and Winchell Ave. 39°07′03″N 84°31′50″W	
23	Benjamin Dombar House and Studio		February 10, 2022 (#100007410)	601 West Galbraith Rd. 39°13′04″N 84°30′10″W	
24	Domhoff Buildings	Domhoff Buildings	March 11, 1980 (#80003047)	4201-4203 Hamilton Ave. and 1604-1614 Chase Ave. 39°09′45″N 84°32′22″W	
25	Eighteenth District School	Eighteenth District School	March 3, 1980 (#80003051)	1326 Hopple St. 39°08′14″N 84°32′18″W	
26	Episcopal Church of the Resurrection	Episcopal Church of the Resurrection	April 13, 1977 (#77001064)	7346-7348 Kirkwood Lane; 39°07′36″N 84°42′10″W	
27	Fairview Public School and Annex	Fairview Public School and Annex	September 16, 2010 (#10000756)	255 Warner St. and 2232 Stratford Ave. 39°07′30″N 84°31′20″W	
28	Findlay Market Building	Findlay Market Building	June 5, 1972 (#72001020)	Esplanade at Elder St., between Elm and Race Sts. 39°06′55″N 84°31′09″W	
29	First German Methodist Episcopal Church	First German Methodist Episcopal Church	March 3, 1980 (#80003054)	1310 Race St. 39°06′35″N 84°30′59″W	
30	Freund-Heintz House	Freund-Heintz House	August 21, 2003 (#03000806)	3332 Whitfield Ave. 39°08′35″N 84°31′26″W	
31	German Evangelical Protestant Cemetery Chapel	German Evangelical Protestant Cemetery Chapel	February 28, 2008 (#08000115)	3701 Vine St. 39°09′21″N 84°30′32″W	
32	Moses Goldsmith Building	Moses Goldsmith Building	June 10, 1982 (#82003580)	356 Bryant; 39°08′45″N 84°31′18″W	
33	Sir Alfred T. Goshorn House	Sir Alfred T. Goshorn House	April 3, 1973 (#73001459)	3540 Clifton Ave. 39°08′50″N 84°31′06″W	
34	Hamilton County Memorial Building	Hamilton County Memorial Building	December 4, 1978 (#78002076)	Elm and Grant Sts. 39°06′31″N 84°31′06″W	
35	Samuel Hannaford House	Samuel Hannaford House	March 3, 1980 (#80003056)	768 Derby Ave. 39°10′17″N 84°31′09″W	
36	George Hatch House	George Hatch House	July 3, 2008 (#08000583)	830 Dayton St. 39°07′06″N 84°31′42″W	
37	Joseph A. Hemann House	Joseph A. Hemann House	April 16, 1980 (#80003057)	49 W. McMillan St. 39°07′38″N 84°30′51″W	
38	Hewson-Gutting House	Hewson-Gutting House	December 21, 1979 (#79001857)	515 Lafayette Ave. 39°09′17″N 84°31′30″W	
39	Hoffner Historic District	Hoffner Historic District	October 3, 1978 (#78002077)	Bounded by Blue Rock, Moline Court, Langland, and Hamilton Aves. 39°09′38″N 84°32′22″W	
40	Hulbert House and McAlpin Bridal Cottage	Hulbert House and McAlpin Bridal Cottage	April 29, 1982 (#82003583)	333 and 341 Lafayette Ave. 39°09′22″N 84°31′12″W	
41	George Hummel House	George Hummel House	March 3, 1980 (#80003059)	3423 Whitfield Ave. 39°08′42″N 84°31′25″W	
42	Kirby Road School	Kirby Road School	September 3, 2013 (#13000681)	1710 Bruce Ave. 39°10′04″N 84°32′45″W	
43	Laurel Homes Historic District	Laurel Homes Historic District	May 19, 1987 (#87000690)	Roughly bounded by Liberty and John Sts., Ezzard Charles Dr., and Linn St. 39°06′41″N 84°31′27″W	
44	John Uri Lloyd House	John Uri Lloyd House	March 7, 1973 (#73001461)	3901 Clifton Ave. 39°09′26″N 84°31′03″W	
45	Lower Price Hill Historic District	Lower Price Hill Historic District	November 15, 1988 (#88002536)	Roughly bounded by W. 8th, State, Burns, and English St. 39°06′13″N 84°33′08″W	
46	S. Gale and Agnes P. Lowrie House	S. Gale and Agnes P. Lowrie House	February 21, 2017 (#100000666)	20 Rawson Woods Circle; 39°09′08″N 84°31′21″W	
47	Lunkenheimer Valve Company Historic District		November 26, 2025 (#100012346)	2423, 2450 Beekman Street, 1515, 1530 Tremont Street, & 1545 Waverly Avenue; 39°07′40″N 84°32′42″W	
48	Masonic Temple Price Hill Lodge, No. 524	Masonic Temple Price Hill Lodge, No. 524	July 3, 2017 (#100001269)	3301 Price Ave. 39°06′26″N 84°33′53″W	
49	Matthew McWilliams House	Matthew McWilliams House	April 28, 2005 (#05000341)	3586 River Rd. 39°04′52″N 84°35′27″W	
50	Melbourne Flats	Melbourne Flats	October 18, 1984 (#84000132)	39 W. McMillan St. 39°07′39″N 84°30′48″W	
51	Charles A. Miller House	Charles A. Miller House	March 3, 1980 (#80003064)	1817 Chase Ave. 39°09′52″N 84°32′54″W	
52	Mohawk Place Historic District	Mohawk Place Historic District	September 1, 2015 (#15000563)	241-290 McMicken Ave., 2009-2024 Mohawk Pl., 218-256 Mohawk St., and 2026 Central Parkway; 39°07′13″N 84°31′26″W	
53	Morrison House	Morrison House	April 3, 1973 (#73001463)	750 Ludlow Ave. 39°08′54″N 84°31′43″W	
54	Mount Airy Forest	Mount Airy Forest	April 13, 2010 (#10000191)	5083 Colerain Ave. 39°10′47″N 84°33′57″W	
55	Northside United Methodist Church	Northside United Methodist Church	March 3, 1980 (#80003068)	1674 Chase; 39°09′50″N 84°32′37″W	
56	Oesterlein Machine Company-Fashion Frocks, Inc. Complex	Oesterlein Machine Company-Fashion Frocks, Inc. Complex	October 27, 2005 (#05001186)	3301 Colerain Ave., 1326 Monmouth Ave. 39°08′36″N 84°32′20″W	
57	Ohio National Guard Armory	Ohio National Guard Armory	March 3, 1980 (#80003069)	1437-1439 Western Ave. 39°06′41″N 84°31′57″W	
58	Old College Hill Post Office	Old College Hill Post Office	June 16, 1976 (#76001437)	1624 Pasadena Ave. 39°11′32″N 84°32′49″W	
59	Our Lady of Mercy High School	Our Lady of Mercy High School	March 3, 1980 (#80003070)	1409 Western Ave. 39°06′39″N 84°31′57″W	
60	Over-the-Rhine Historic District	Over-the-Rhine Historic District	May 17, 1983 (#83001985)	Roughly bounded by Dorsey, Sycamore, Liberty, Reading, Central Parkway, McMicken Ave., and Vine Sts.; 308-322, 500-550 Reading Rd., 222 W. 12th St., 1208, 1416-1430, 1544, 1600, 1628, 1900 Central Pkwy. 39°06′52″N 84°30′54″W	Extends into eastern Cincinnati. Second set of addresses represents a boundary increase on 2014-06-13.
61	Parkside Apartments	Parkside Apartments	February 28, 2008 (#08000116)	3315-3317 Jefferson Ave. 39°08′27″N 84°30′50″W	
62	Pinecroft	Pinecroft	December 17, 2008 (#08001197)	2336 Kipling Ave. 39°12′10″N 84°34′13″W	
63	Police Station No. 3	Police Station No. 3	May 18, 1981 (#81000435)	3201 Warsaw Ave. 39°06′34″N 84°33′47″W	
64	Police Station No. 5	Police Station No. 5	March 3, 1980 (#80003075)	1024-1026 York St. 39°07′04″N 84°31′57″W	
65	Police Station No. 7	Police Station No. 7	May 18, 1981 (#81000437)	355 McMillan St. 39°07′41″N 84°31′31″W	
66	Potter's Field - West Price Hill	Potter's Field - West Price Hill	April 26, 2024 (#100010226)	4700 Guerley Road; 39°07′08″N 84°35′27″W	
67	Probasco Fountain	Probasco Fountain	March 3, 1980 (#80003077)	Clifton Ave. 39°09′02″N 84°31′07″W	
68	Henry Probasco House	Henry Probasco House	November 9, 1972 (#72001022)	430 W. Cliff Lane; 39°09′29″N 84°31′26″W	
69	Heinrich A. Rattermann House	Heinrich A. Rattermann House	May 23, 1980 (#80003080)	510 York St. 39°07′02″N 84°31′25″W	
70	Rawson House	Rawson House	July 24, 1973 (#73001465)	3767 Clifton Ave. 39°09′08″N 84°31′10″W	
71	Regal Theater		September 5, 2023 (#100009302)	1201 Linn St. 39°06′29″N 84°31′41″W	
72	William Resor House	William Resor House	March 7, 1973 (#73001466)	254 Greendale Ave. 39°09′06″N 84°31′01″W	
73	Charles B. Russell House	Charles B. Russell House	March 3, 1980 (#80003081)	3416 Brookline Ave. 39°08′35″N 84°30′54″W	
74	Sacred Heart Academy	Sacred Heart Academy	April 11, 1973 (#73001467)	525 Lafayette St. 39°09′11″N 84°31′38″W	
75	St. Aloysius-on-the-Ohio	St. Aloysius-on-the-Ohio	December 23, 2014 (#14001075)	134 Whipple St., 6207, 6214, and 6218 Portage St., and 6206 Gracely Dr. 39°06′20″N 84°41′04″W	
76	St. Francis Hospital	St. Francis Hospital	April 19, 1984 (#84003714)	1860 Queen City Ave. 39°07′37″N 84°33′37″W	
77	St. George Parish and Newman Center	St. George Parish and Newman Center	March 3, 1980 (#80003088)	42 Calhoun St. 39°07′43″N 84°30′45″W	
78	St. Leo the Great Historic District		August 6, 2026 (#100013287)	2569 and 2573 St. Leo Place; 39°08′02″N 84°33′27″W	
79	St. Patrick's Catholic Church	St. Patrick's Catholic Church	December 4, 1978 (#78002081)	1662 Blue Rock; 39°09′38″N 84°32′30″W	
80	St. Peter's Lick Run Historic District	St. Peter's Lick Run Historic District	October 4, 1989 (#89001453)	2145-2153 Queen City Ave. 39°07′39″N 84°34′20″W	
81	George F. Sands School	George F. Sands School	August 24, 2017 (#100001507)	940 Poplar St. 39°06′55″N 84°31′52″W	
82	Scarlet Oaks	Scarlet Oaks	March 7, 1973 (#73001468)	440 Lafayette Ave. 39°09′25″N 84°31′32″W	
83	George Scott House	George Scott House	March 3, 1980 (#80003084)	565 Purcell Ave. 39°06′11″N 84°33′55″W	
84	Sedamsville River Road Historic District	Sedamsville River Road Historic District	October 10, 2008 (#08000975)	2449-2734 River Rd., 309-317 Mt. Hope Ave., and 604 Mt. Echo Park Dr. 39°05′44″N 84°33′32″W	
85	Sedamsville Village Historic District	Sedamsville Village Historic District	July 3, 2012 (#12000393)	Steiner, Delhi, and Fairbanks Aves., and Sedam and Edwin Sts. 39°05′32″N 84°34′20″W	
86	Short Woods Park Mound	Short Woods Park Mound	October 1, 1974 (#74001521)	Northern side of Sayler Park; 39°07′17″N 84°41′42″W	
87	Spring Grove Cemetery	Spring Grove Cemetery	May 13, 1976 (#76001440)	4521 Spring Grove Ave. 39°10′11″N 84°31′32″W	
88	Spring Grove Cemetery Chapel	Spring Grove Cemetery Chapel	March 3, 1980 (#80003086)	4521 Spring Grove Ave. 39°09′52″N 84°31′25″W	
89	Joseph G. Steinkamp House		May 22, 2025 (#100011835)	916 Suire Avenue; 39°06′33″N 84°34′55″W	
90	Story Mound	Story Mound	June 11, 1975 (#75001436)	Gracely Dr. 39°07′01″N 84°41′21″W	In Sayler Park
91	Peter G. Thomson House	Peter G. Thomson House	November 29, 1979 (#79001860)	5870 Belmont Ave. 39°11′56″N 84°33′16″W	
92	Union Baptist Cemetery	Union Baptist Cemetery	September 20, 2002 (#02001057)	4933 Cleves Warsaw Pike; 39°07′00″N 84°36′10″W	
93	Warsaw Avenue Historic District		August 24, 2020 (#100005462)	3104-3220 Warsaw Ave. 39°06′36″N 84°33′47″W	
94	Westwood Town Center Historic District	Westwood Town Center Historic District	December 2, 1974 (#74001515)	Epworth and Harrison Aves. 39°08′57″N 84°35′56″W	
95	Westwood United Methodist Church	Westwood United Methodist Church	March 3, 1980 (#80003090)	Epworth and Urwiler Sts. 39°09′03″N 84°35′58″W	
96	Samuel and Sally Wilson House	Samuel and Sally Wilson House	November 15, 2000 (#00001295)	1502 Aster Place; 39°11′31″N 84°32′40″W	
97	Winton Place Methodist Episcopal Church	Winton Place Methodist Episcopal Church	March 3, 1980 (#80003091)	700 E. Epworth Ave. 39°10′24″N 84°30′59″W	
98	Winton Terrace Historic District		March 6, 2023 (#100008657)	4848,4802-5070 and 4803-5089 Winneste Ave., 402-512 Kings Run Dr., 4703-4861 Este Ave., 1-293 Craft St., 3-59 Kings Run Ct., and 3-110 Topridge Pl. 39°10′43″N 84°30′35″W	
99	Daniel Thew Wright House	Daniel Thew Wright House	September 28, 1982 (#82003590)	3716 River Rd. 39°04′45″N 84°35′46″W	

== Former listings ==
	Name on the Register	Image	Date listed	Date removed	Location	Description
1	William Salway House		March 3, 1980 (#80003082)	October 29, 1985	Gray and Winton Rds.	
2	Sayler House		December 4, 1973 (#73002285)	September 30, 1976	6901 Gracely Dr.	Severely damaged by an F5 tornado during the April 3, 1974 Super Outbreak.

== See also ==
- List of National Historic Landmarks in Ohio
- National Register of Historic Places listings in Cincinnati, Ohio

== Notes ==
a: Stated more precisely, this list includes the portions of the city located west of a line running along Interstate 75 from the Ohio River to Central Parkway, east to Vine Street, and north to the city's northern edge.
