= Cummins School =

- U.S. National Register of Historic Places
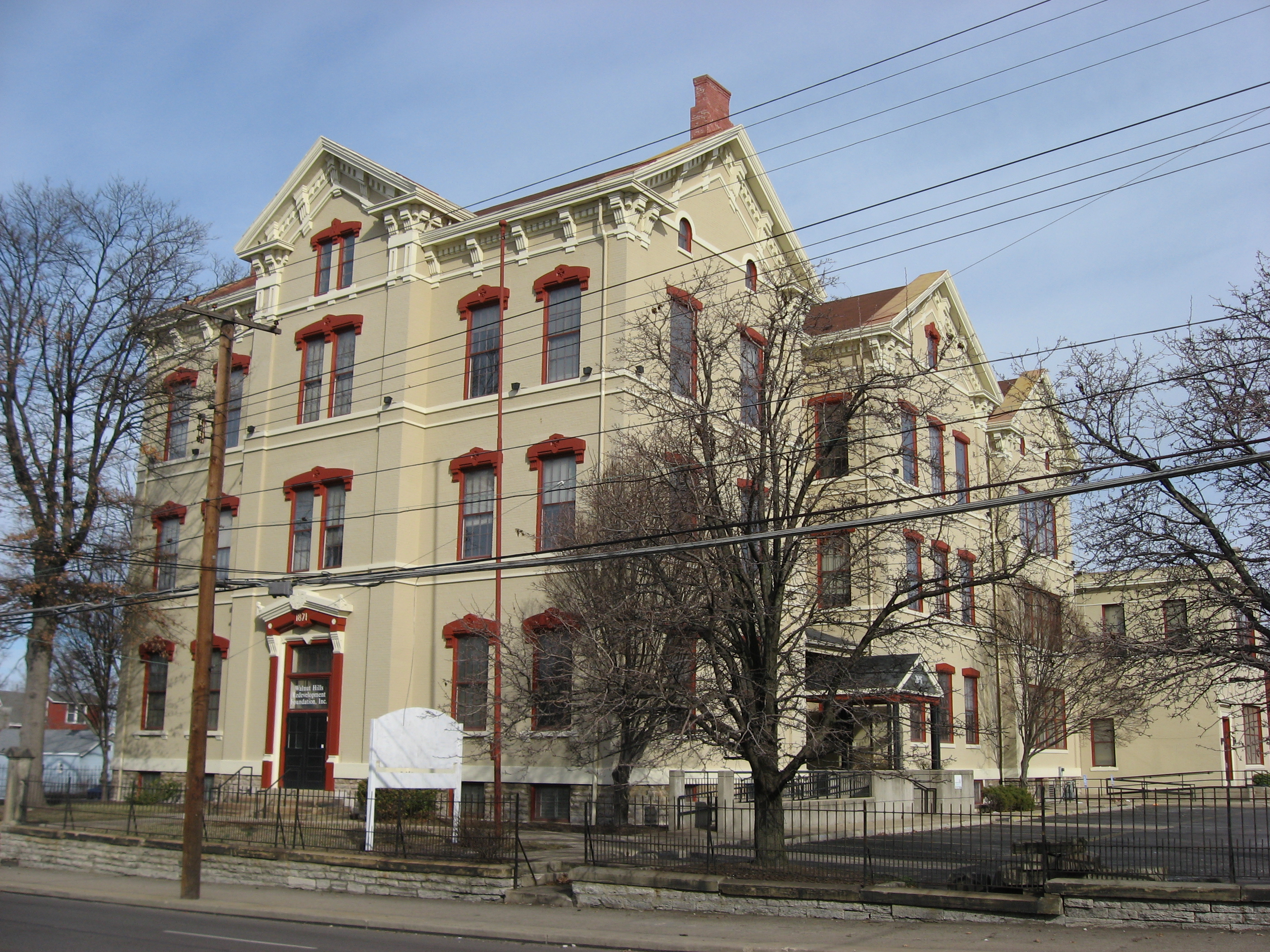
- Front and eastern side of the school

- Location within Ohio Location within the United States
- Location: 824 William Howard Taft Rd., Cincinnati, Ohio
- Coordinates: 39°7′40″N 84°29′27″W
- Area: Less than 1 acre (0.40 ha)
- Built: 1871
- Architect: Samuel Hannaford; Edward C. Crofton
- Architectural style: Italianate
- MPS: Samuel Hannaford and Sons TR in Hamilton County
- NRHP reference No.: 86000014
- Added to NRHP: January 9, 1986

The Cummins School is a historic former school building in Cincinnati, Ohio, United States. Built in 1871 in the neighborhood of Walnut Hills, it was later used as a model for the construction of other city school buildings.

One of several Cincinnati school buildings designed by Samuel Hannaford, the Cummins School is a 3 1/2-story building. Built of brick with a stone foundation, it is topped with an asphalt roof and includes other elements of stone. Among its distinctive features are wrought iron stairways, ornamental wooden frames around the doors and windows, and wainscoting. The building's general floor plan features a central hallway, with classrooms lining both sides. The building as a whole was laid out in the shape of a double letter "E" to allow each room an increased amount of window space. Besides classrooms, the interior was equipped with rooms such as a library, a laboratory, and an office for the principal. One of the many forward-looking elements of its design was the heating system: although the building was originally heated with stoves, it was built to permit easy conversion to a steam-powered central heating system. More than thirty years after the building's construction, it was expanded by the addition of a small Neoclassical structure on its rear. The building as a whole was built in the Italianate style, similar to other Cincinnati schools built at the same time, such as the McKinley School on the city's east side.

The Cummins School was eventually used by Cincinnati Public Schools as a model for later construction, due to its useful and economical floor plan. Its history paralleled that of the Eighteenth District School in the Camp Washington neighborhood; also a three-story Italianate brick building designed by Hannaford, it was erected in 1882 and expanded in 1908 and 1916. Hannaford's company continued to design buildings for Cincinnati Public Schools into the early twentieth century, their strong reputation having been established by buildings such as Cummins.

In 1986, the Cummins School was listed on the National Register of Historic Places in recognition of its historically significant architecture. It joined dozens of other Hannaford designs in Hamilton County that had been listed on the National Register in 1980, including the Eighteenth District School. Five years later, the school was renovated at a cost of approximately $2,100,000. Today, it is used as an office building.
