= Rawson House =

Historic house in Ohio, United States

- U.S. National Register of Historic Places
- U.S. Historic district – Contributing property
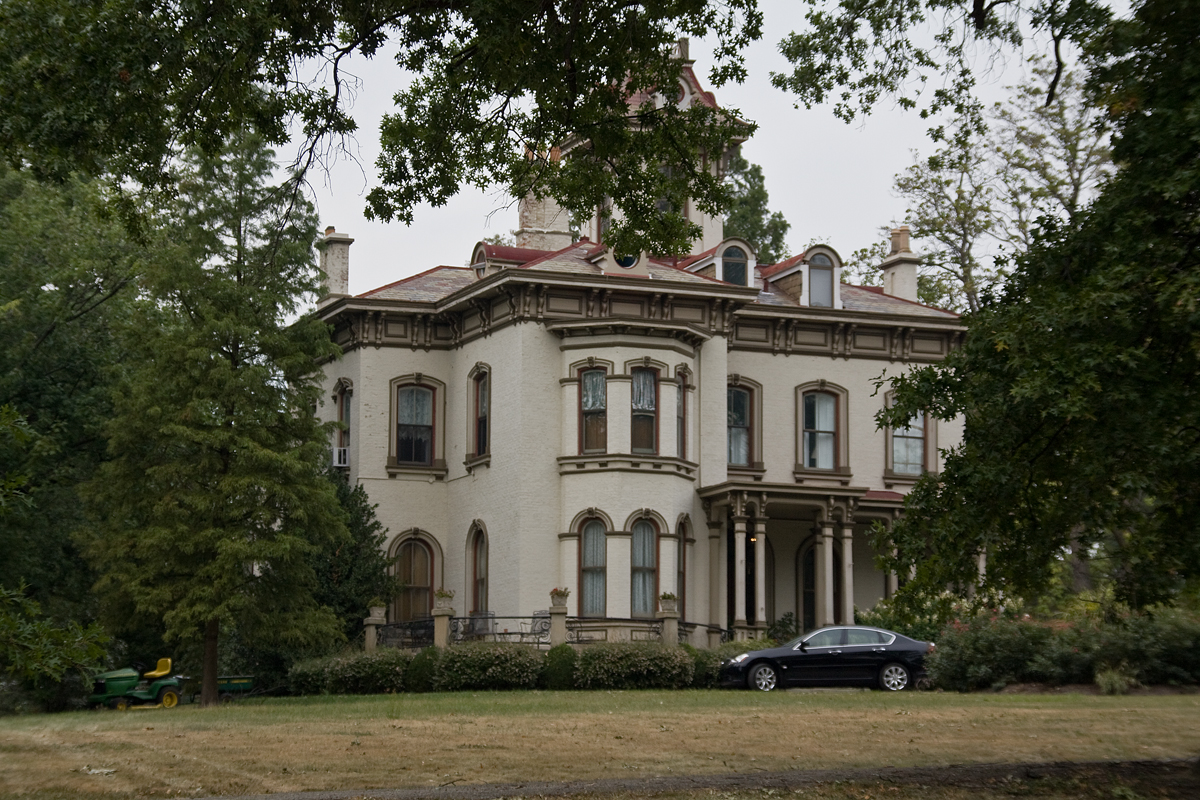
- Front of the Rawson House

- Location within Ohio Location within the United States
- Location: 3767 Clifton Ave., Cincinnati, Ohio
- Coordinates: 39°9′8″N 84°31′10″W
- Area: Less than 1 acre (0.40 ha)
- Architectural style: Italian Villa
- Part of: Clifton Avenue Historic District (ID78002074)
- NRHP reference No.: 73001465
- Added to NRHP: July 24, 1973

The Rawson House is a historic building along Clifton Avenue in Cincinnati, Ohio, United States.

== History ==
Erected circa 1870, it has been ranked as a fine example of the Italian Villa style of architecture. Built with brick walls and elements of wood and stone, it was originally the home of Jacob Lloyd Wayne. Later, the house was sold to Joseph Rawson, who was the president of a local meat packing firm and then the vice-president of the city's First National Bank.

== National Register of Historic Places ==
In 1973, the Rawson House was listed on the National Register of Historic Places. Non-archaeological historic sites in the United States qualify to be listed on the National Register by passing any of three different criteria: significant historical role, relation to a historically significant person, or historically significant architecture. It is possible for properties to meet more than one criterion; the Rawson House fit all three. Five years later, a group of properties along Clifton Avenue were designated a historic district, the Clifton Avenue Historic District; the Rawson House is a contributing property to that district.
