= National Register of Historic Places listings in Cincinnati =

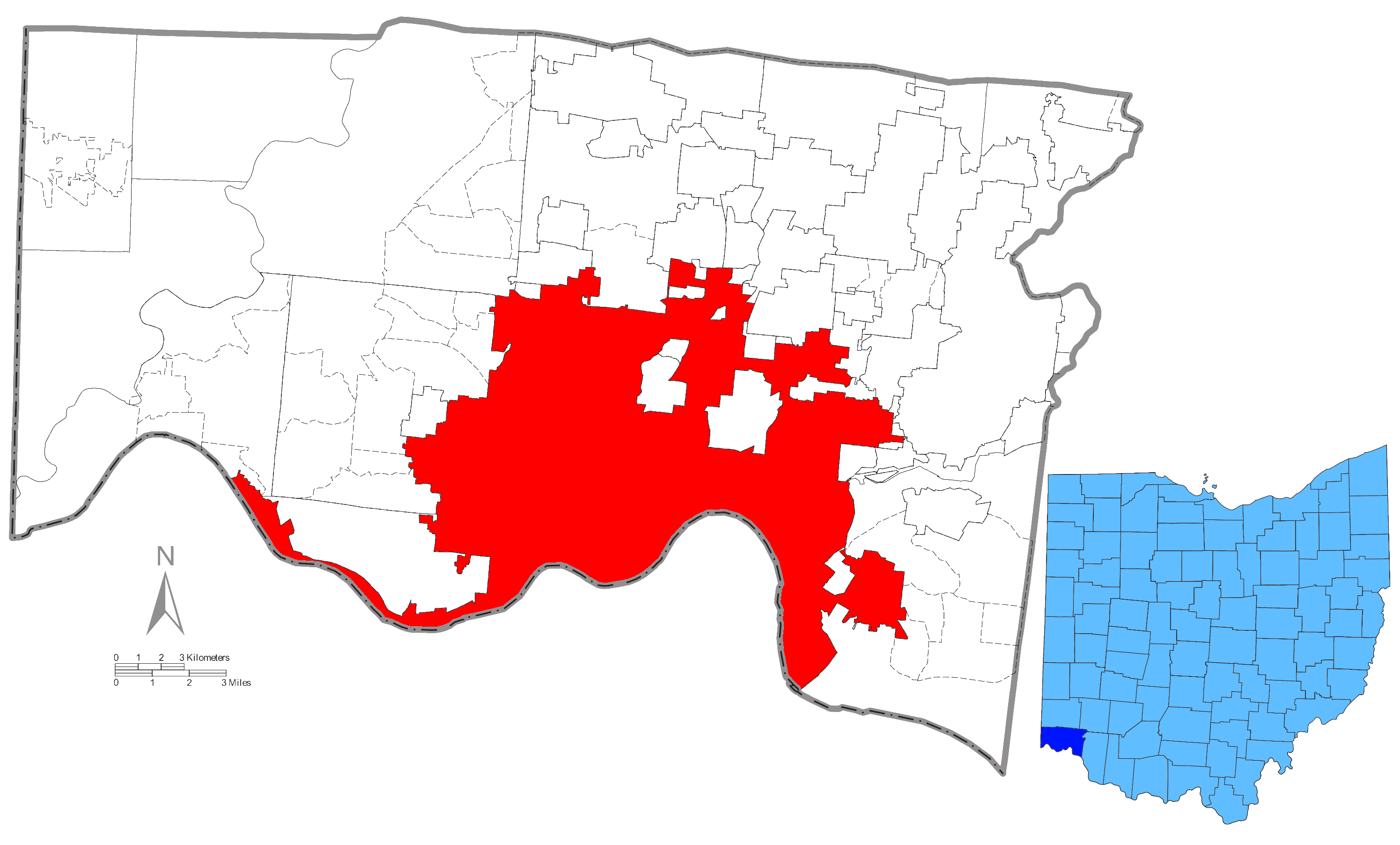
Location of Cincinnati in Ohio

This is a list of the National Register of Historic Places listings in Cincinnati, Ohio.

This is intended to be a complete list of the properties and districts on the National Register of Historic Places in Cincinnati, Ohio, United States. Latitude and longitude coordinates are provided for many National Register properties and districts; these locations may be seen together in an online map.

There are 398 properties and districts listed on the National Register in Hamilton County, including 14 National Historic Landmarks. The city of Cincinnati is the location of 298 of these properties and districts, including 12 National Historic Landmarks; they are listed here, while the remaining properties and districts, including 3 National Historic Landmarks, are listed separately.

This National Park Service list is complete through NPS recent listings posted August 21, 2026.

== Number of listings by region ==
The properties are distributed across all parts of Cincinnati. For the purposes of this list, the city is split into three regions: Downtown Cincinnati, which includes all of the city south of Central Parkway, west of Interstates 71 and 471, and east of Interstate 75; Eastern Cincinnati, which includes all of the city outside Downtown Cincinnati and east of Vine Street; and Western Cincinnati, which includes all of the city outside Downtown Cincinnati and west of Vine Street. One district, the Over-the-Rhine Historic District, is split between Eastern and Western Cincinnati.

#	Region	# of Sites
1	Downtown Cincinnati	63
2	Eastern Cincinnati	137
3	Western Cincinnati	99
(Duplicates):		(1)
Total:		298

== See also ==
- List of National Historic Landmarks in Ohio
- National Register of Historic Places listings in Ohio
