= Westwood United Methodist Church =

Historic church in Ohio, United States

- U.S. National Register of Historic Places
- U.S. Historic district – Contributing property
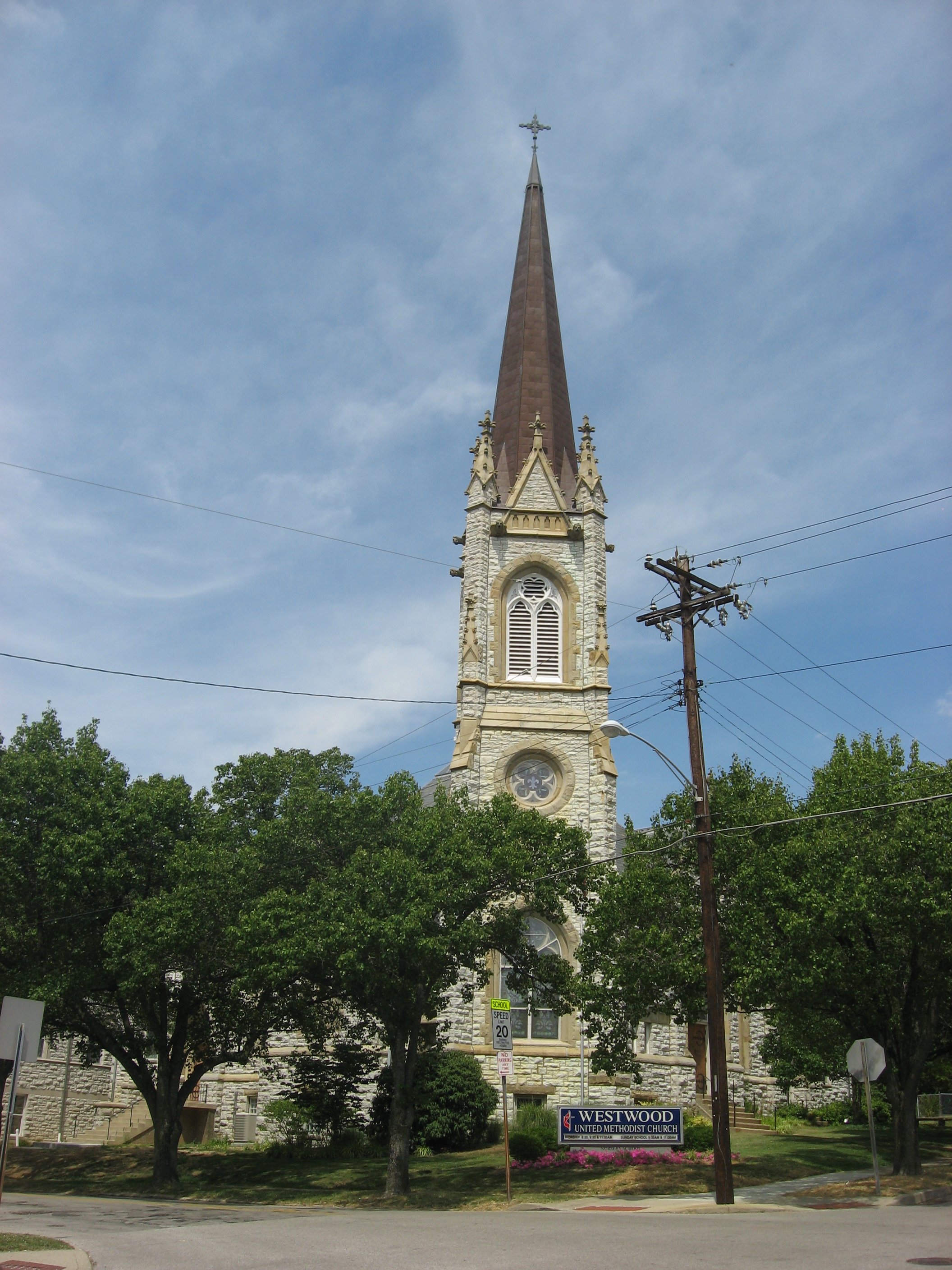
- Front of the church

- Location within Ohio Location within the United States
- Location: Epworth and Urwiler Sts., Cincinnati, Ohio
- Coordinates: 39°9′3″N 84°35′57″W
- Area: 0 acres (0 ha)
- Built: 1896
- Architect: Samuel Hannaford & Sons
- Architectural style: Gothic
- Part of: Westwood Town Center Historic District (ID74001515)
- MPS: Samuel Hannaford and Sons TR in Hamilton County
- NRHP reference No.: 80003090
- Added to NRHP: March 3, 1980

Westwood United Methodist Church is a historic Methodist church in Cincinnati, Ohio, United States. Constructed in 1896 for an established congregation, it has been named a historic site.

Westwood Methodist Episcopal Church formed in 1838, and the members worshipped in each others' houses until 1842. By the 1890s, the members were ready for a newer building, and they contracted with master architect Samuel Hannaford to design it. Hannaford had designed numerous Cincinnati-area churches by this time, concentrating on the Gothic Revival and Romanesque Revival styles. Completed in 1896, the building was functionally unchanged for its first thirty years, although the first of multiple additions was constructed in 1926.

The church occupies a corner lot at the heart of the Westwood neighborhood. A clear example of the Gothic Revival style, the church is distinguished by a tall steeple crowned by a yet taller spire. The overall massing of the building is composed by its multi-gabled form and extensive fenestration, filled with stained glass, and the exterior is covered with rough-faced ashlar stonework. Slates cover the roof, and elements of copper and sandstone are prominent, due to the copper covering on the eight-sided spire and the large sandstone lintels surrounding the windows in the belfry and the main section of the building. Much of the building's ornamentation is also placed on the steeple, including windows with fleurs de lis and quatrefoils in their designs, and buttresses supporting the overall structure.

In 1974, central Westwood was designated a historic district, the Westwood Town Center Historic District, and listed on the National Register of Historic Places, and the church (now part of the United Methodist Church) was included as one of the district's contributing properties. Six years later, the church was individually listed on the Register, along with more than fifty other Hannaford-designed buildings in the Cincinnati area; like most of the other buildings in the group, it qualified for designation because of its historically significant architecture.
