= St. Aloysius on the Ohio =

- St. Aloysius-on-the-Ohio
- U.S. National Register of Historic Places
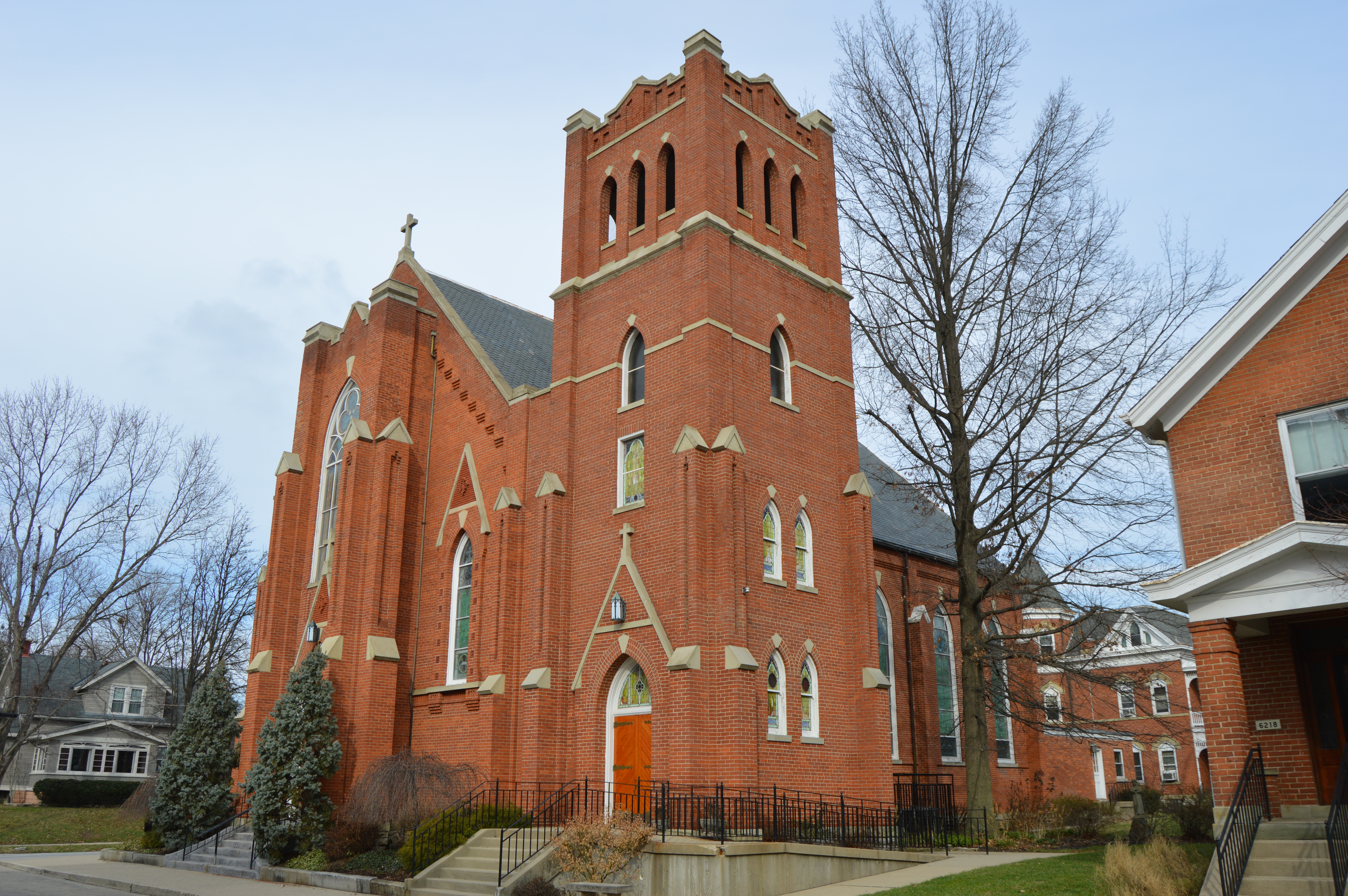
- St. Aloysius on the Ohio Church

- Location within Ohio Location within the United States
- Location: 134 Whipple St.; 6207, 6214, and 6218 Portage St.; and 6206 Gracely Dr., Cincinnati, Ohio
- Coordinates: 39°6′19″N 84°41′4″W
- Architect: Adolphus Druiding; Fred Drucker, Jr.
- Architectural style: Gothic Revival; Queen Anne; Colonial Revival
- NRHP reference No.: 14001075
- Added to NRHP: December 23, 2014

Saint Aloysius on the Ohio (locally known as St. Al's) is a Roman Catholic parish in the Sayler Park neighborhood of Cincinnati, Ohio, United States. The parish is part of the Archdiocese of Cincinnati. It is named after St. Aloysius Gonzaga and located near the Ohio River.

== History ==
The parish started in 1868 when German American Catholics who worshiped at Our Lady of Victory Parish in Delhi Township built a one-room schoolhouse for Lower Delhi children. The adjoining church was dedicated on June 29, 1873. In 1885, the parish purchased land for a new church, which was dedicated on October 28, 1888. In 1890, the school moved into the former church building, and the Sisters of St. Francis of Oldenburg came to staff the school, which grew to include high school grades. A rectory was added in 1898.

In 1905, the original one-room schoolhouse was torn down, and the current school building opened on June 3, 1906. The original church building was torn down in 1916. The church's 150-foot-tall (46 m) steeple was condemned and torn down and torn down in 1923, along with the original rectory. High school grades were eliminated in the 1930s. The church was renovated in 1931, 1952, 1998, and 2001.

Pre-kindergarten and kindergarten classes were added in the 2000s. In 2006, the Cincinnati/Northern Kentucky International Airport across the river paid for soundproof windows and air conditioning in the school building as part of a noise abatement program and also dropped the ceilings by 5 feet (1.5 m). On December 23, 2014, the church, school, and rectory – four buildings in all – were added to the National Register of Historic Places, owing to their locally significant architecture. The school closed May 24, 2018, due to declining enrollment.

== See also ==
- National Register of Historic Places listings in western Cincinnati
