= William Resor House =

Historic house in Ohio, United States

- U.S. National Register of Historic Places
- U.S. Historic district – Contributing property
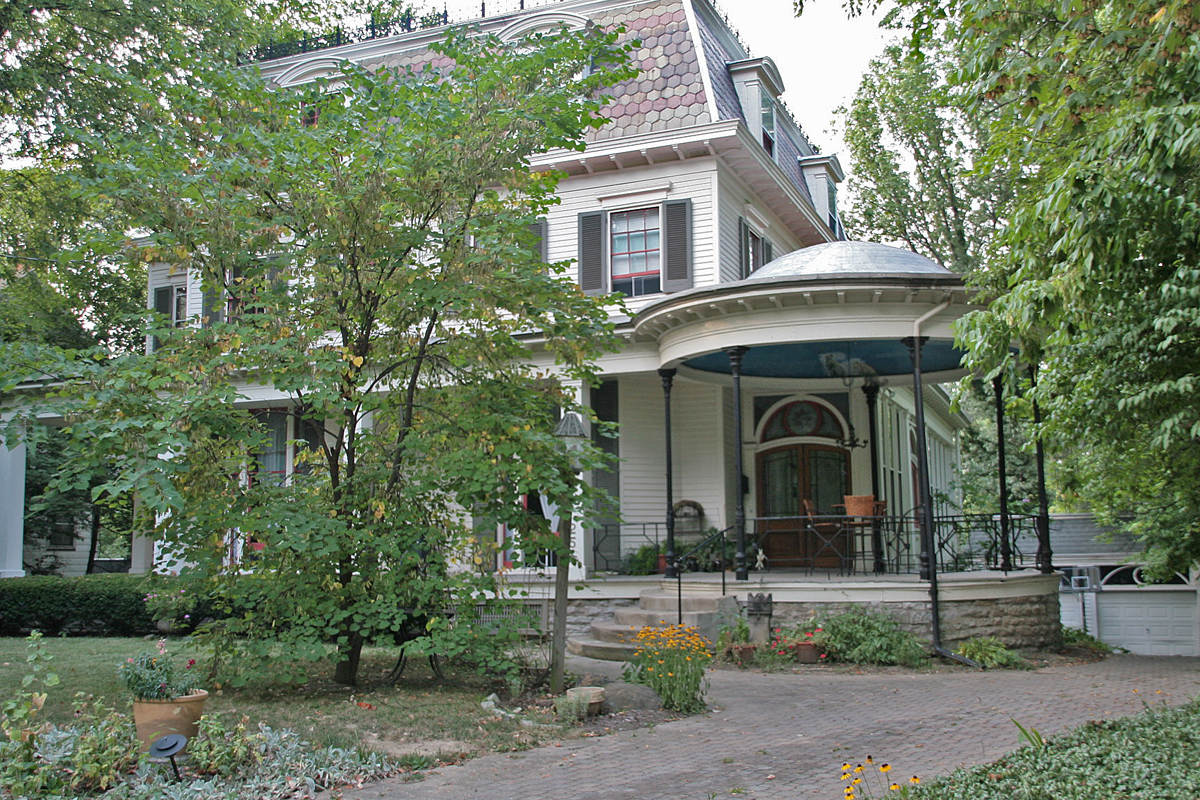
- Front of the house

- Location within Ohio Location within the United States
- Location: 254 Greendale Ave., Cincinnati, Ohio
- Coordinates: 39°9′6″N 84°31′1″W
- Area: Less than 1 acre (0.40 ha)
- Built: 1843
- Architect: William Resor
- Part of: Clifton Avenue Historic District (ID78002074)
- NRHP reference No.: 73001466
- Added to NRHP: March 7, 1973

The William Resor House is a historic residence on Greendale Avenue in Cincinnati, Ohio, United States. Built in 1843, this three-story building is distinguished by architectural elements such as a mansard roof, third-story dormer windows, and a large wrap-around verandah porch. The front of the house is a simple square, but its facade is broken up by the roofline of the porch, which includes a gazebo with a dome and cast iron decorations. These elements are newer than the rest of the house, having been added in the 1890s at the same time as a relocation, at which time the house was turned to face Greendale Avenue. When built, the house was a simple box in the Greek Revival style, and it assumed its present Second Empire appearance only after an intermediate period in which the style was a generic Victorian. The previous occupant of the site had been a summer cottage.

The Resor House was built for William Resor, a wealthy businessman who had become prominent in Cincinnati society through the prosperity of his stove factory. In his old age, Resor participated in such civic activities as the establishment of the Cincinnati Zoo and the creation of the Cincinnati Art Museum. The original landscaping was by Adolph Strauch.

In 1973, the Resor House was listed on the National Register of Historic Places, due to its well-preserved historic architecture. Five years later, it was one of many properties in the Clifton neighborhood designated a historic district, the Clifton Avenue Historic District, and added together to the Register.
