= Moses Goldsmith Building =

Historic house in Ohio, United States

- U.S. National Register of Historic Places
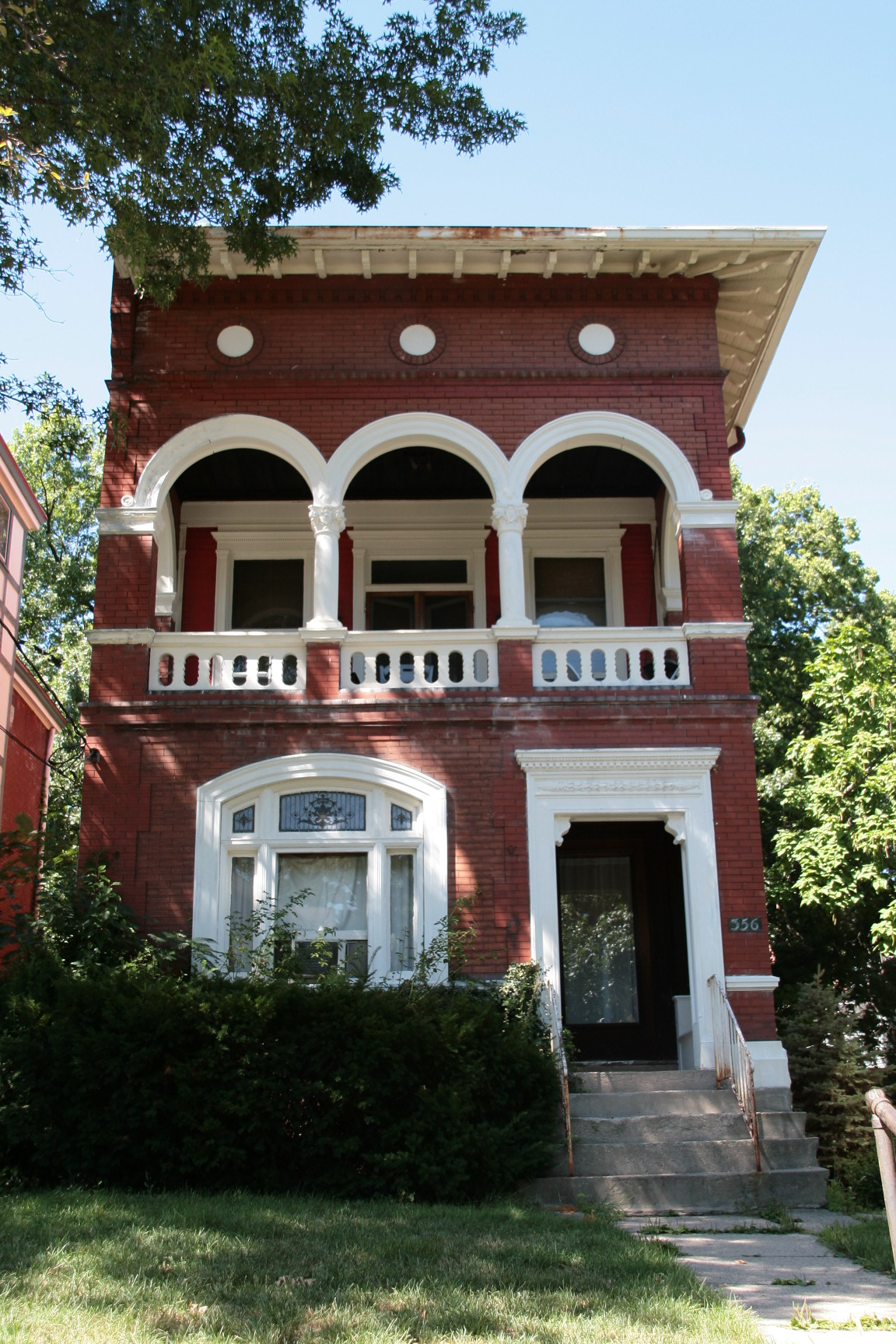
- Front of the Goldsmith Building

- Location within Ohio Location within the United States
- Location: 356 Bryant, Cincinnati, Ohio
- Coordinates: 39°8′44″N 84°31′17″W
- Area: less than one acre
- Built: 1900
- Architectural style: Second Renaissance Revival
- NRHP reference No.: 82003580
- Added to NRHP: June 10, 1982

The Moses Goldsmith Building is a historic residence in Cincinnati, Ohio, United States. Built in 1900, it was originally owned by Moses Goldsmith, the president of a firm that sold notions; rather than living in the house, Goldsmith built it for investment purposes, renting it to others.

A brick house with elements of sandstone and limestone, the Goldsmith Building has been ranked as a fine example of Renaissance Revival architecture. Distinctive elements of its design include prominent string courses and molding courses, plus a large loggia.

The Goldsmith Building was erected in the Clifton neighborhood at a time when that neighborhood was expanding greatly. Large numbers of prosperous members of Cincinnati society built grand homes in the neighborhood, making it a highly distinctive portion of the city. The house did not long stay in the Goldsmith family; Moses died within a few years of its construction, and his heirs sold the property in 1912. After Goldsmith's time, it was converted from a single-family residence to a multi-family residence. In 1982, the Goldsmith Building was listed on the National Register of Historic Places, due to its historically significant architecture; key to this designation was its loggia, which is almost unknown in Cincinnati.

A book about The Moses Goldsmith Building was written in 2022. It is titled Notions: The Story of Cincinnati's Moses Goldsmith Building by Lisa Govan.
