= Beech Avenue Houses =

Historic houses in Ohio, United States

- U.S. National Register of Historic Places
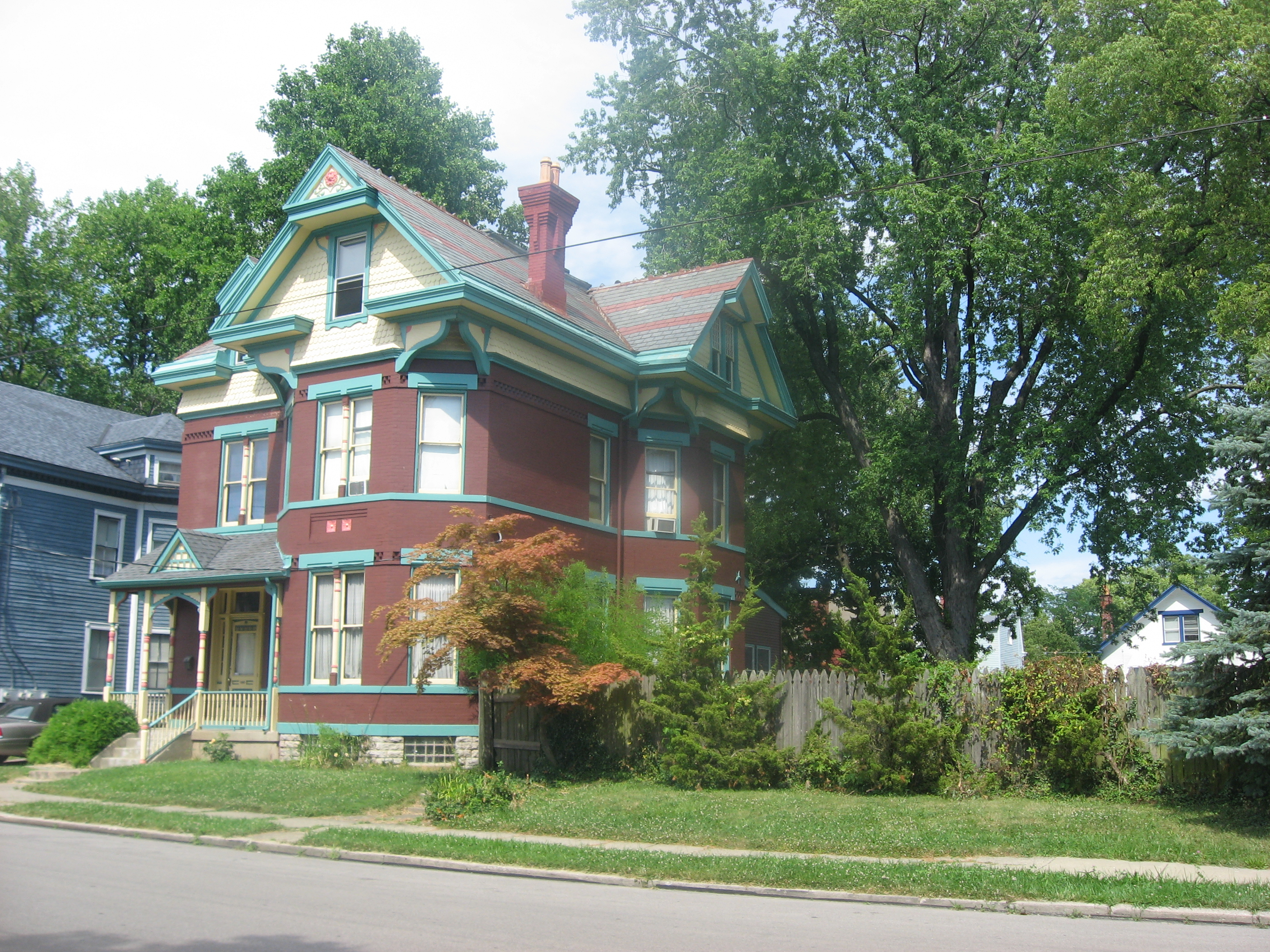
- The remaining house

- Location within Ohio Location within the United States
- Location: 1128 Beech Avenue, Cincinnati, Ohio
- Coordinates: 39°6′46″N 84°34′38″W
- Architectural style: Queen Anne
- NRHP reference No.: 79001853
- Added to NRHP: February 16, 1979

Beech Avenue Houses is a registered historic building in Cincinnati, Ohio, listed in the National Register on February 16, 1979.

== Historic Uses ==
- Single Dwelling
