= Hulbert House and McAlpin Bridal Cottage =

Historic house in Ohio, United States

- U.S. National Register of Historic Places
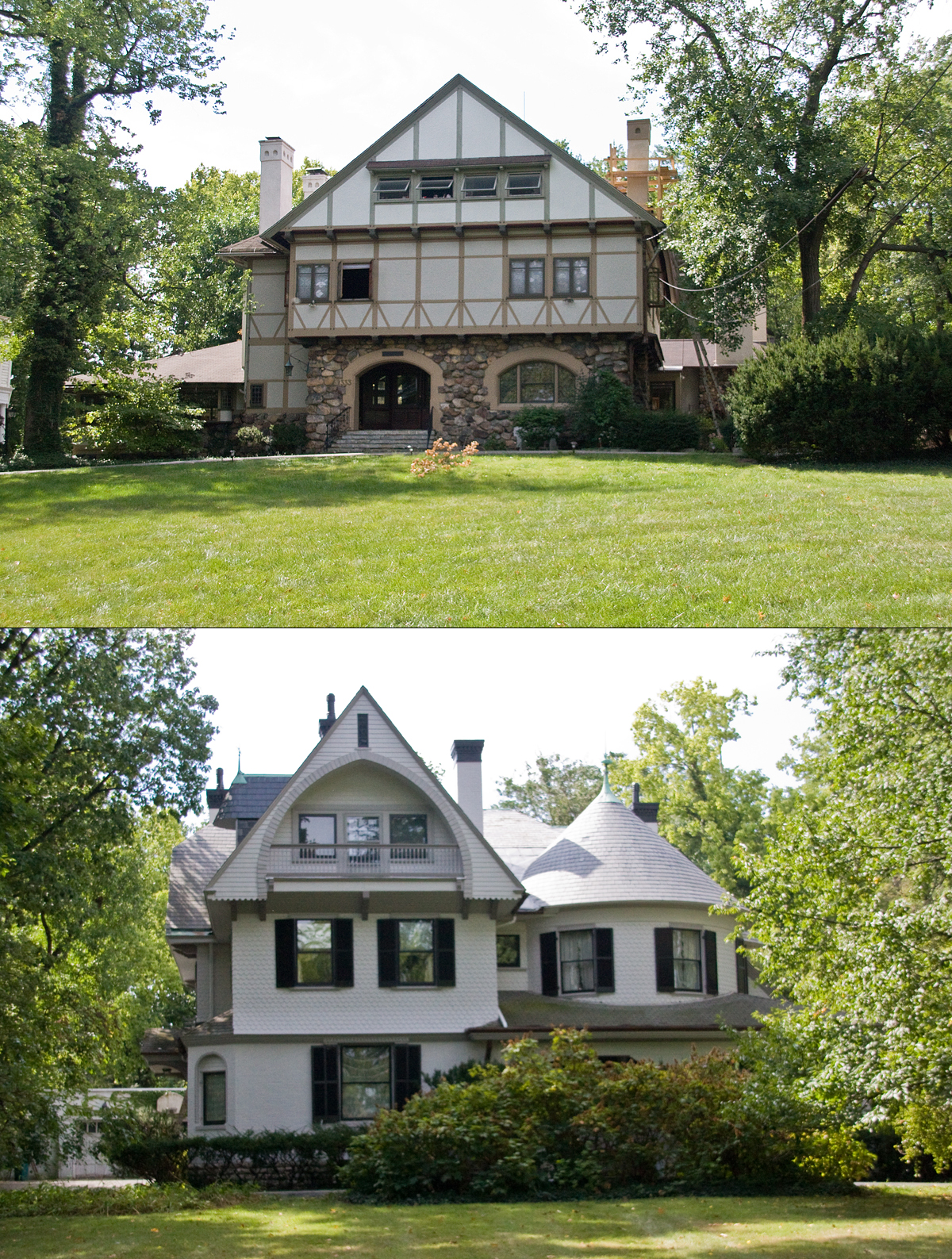

- Location within Ohio Location within the United States
- Location: 333 and 341 Lafayette Ave., Cincinnati, Ohio
- Coordinates: 39°9′22″N 84°31′12″W
- Area: 2 acres (0.81 ha)
- Built: 1886
- Architect: Lucien F. Plympton
- Architectural style: Queen Anne
- NRHP reference No.: 82003583
- Added to NRHP: April 29, 1982

The Hulbert House and McAlpin Bridal Cottage are two historic houses in Cincinnati, Ohio, United States. They have together been listed in the National Register of Historic Places since April 29, 1982.

== Historic uses ==
- Single Dwelling
