= George Scott House =

Historic house in Ohio, United States

- U.S. National Register of Historic Places
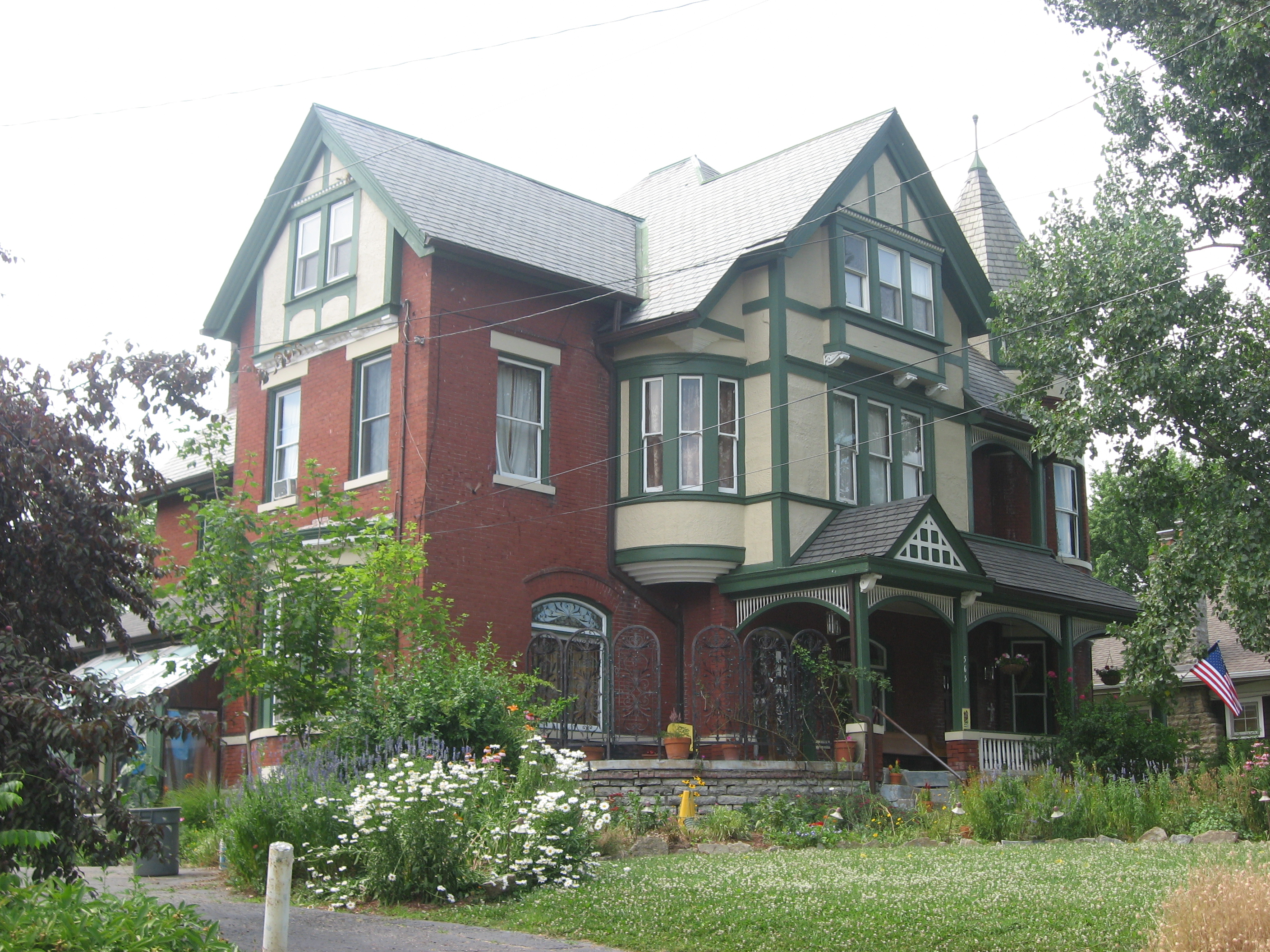
- Overview of the house

- Location within Ohio Location within the United States
- Location: 565 Purcell Ave., Cincinnati, Ohio
- Coordinates: 39°6′9″N 84°33′54″W
- Area: Less than 1 acre (0.40 ha)
- Built: 1887
- Architect: Samuel Hannaford and Sons
- Architectural style: Queen Anne
- MPS: Samuel Hannaford and Sons TR in Hamilton County
- NRHP reference No.: 80003084
- Added to NRHP: March 3, 1980

The George Scott House is a historic residence in Cincinnati, Ohio, United States. Built in the 1880s according to a design by prominent architect Samuel Hannaford, it was originally home to a prosperous businessman, and it has been named a historic site.

Scott was one of the executives at George Scott's Sons Pottery, a family-owned business along the Ohio River near downtown. In 1846, the previous George Scott had come to the United States, soon settling in Cincinnati and establishing a highly successful pottery firm. Following his death, the company's name was changed to "George Scott's Sons". The firm was highly prosperous due to its manufacture of potteries ranging from Rockingham-type wares to yellowware, and by the 1870s it had become the country's largest producer of both types.

Samuel Hannaford gained a reputation as one of Cincinnati's best architects following his production of Music Hall in the 1870s, and the city's growth provided plenty of demand for the services of such an architect. During the late nineteenth century, he was responsible for designing many fine residences like the Scott House: many prominent businessmen and politicians of the Gilded Age found his designs highly appealing, and the wealthy neighborhoods of Clifton, Walnut Hills, and Avondale were dotted with grand Hannaford houses. It was this architect whom Scott chose to design his own residence in 1887.

Scott's house features a mix of materials: the foundation is stone, the walls are brick, the roof is slate, and wooden elements are also prominent. Two and a half stories tall, the house combines generic Victorian styling with Queen Anne influences. Among its prominent components are the large gables formed by the rooflines, Eastlake-style details on the porch, and a turret on one corner. Half-timbering with stucco covers many of the front walls above and around the porch, which itself includes details such as a pediment and frieze, while the turret's exterior comprises numerous lintels and lugsills, and its roof is an eight-sided pyramid.

In 1980, the George Scott House was listed on the National Register of Historic Places, qualifying because of its architecture; it was deemed a fine example of the changing architectural tastes of the late 19th century, which Hannaford frequently embraced by designing numerous buildings in varying architectural styles. Scott's house was part of a group of dozens of Hannaford-designed buildings in Hamilton County added to the Register together as part of a multiple property submission.
