= Daniel Thew Wright House =

- U.S. National Register of Historic Places
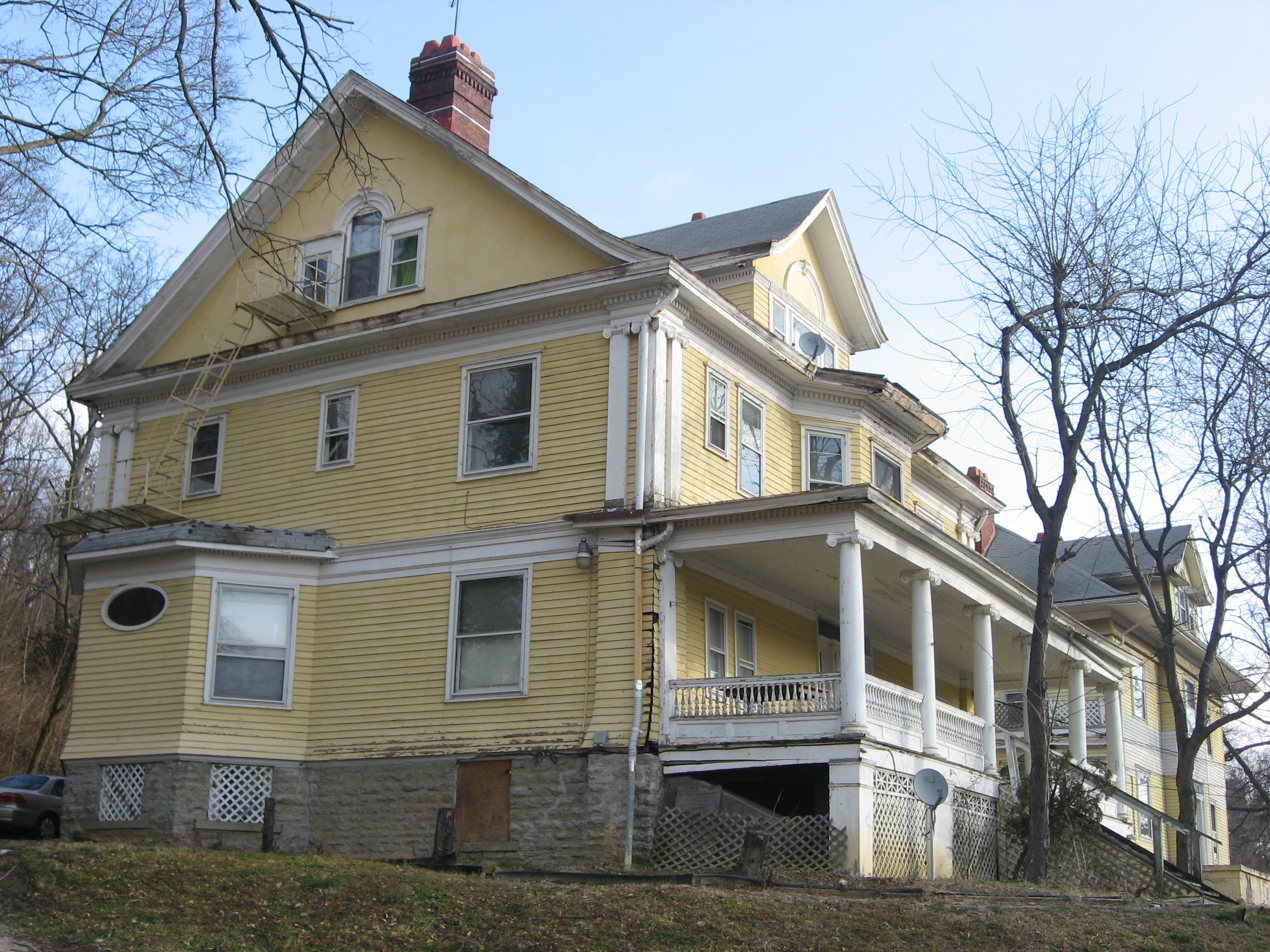
- Front and western side

- Location within Ohio Location within the United States
- Location: 3716 River Road (US 50), Cincinnati, Ohio
- Coordinates: 39°4′45″N 84°35′46″W
- Area: Less than 1 acre (0.40 ha)
- Built: 1895
- Architectural style: Colonial Revival
- NRHP reference No.: 82003590
- Added to NRHP: September 28, 1982

The Daniel Thew Wright House is a historic residence in the far western part of Cincinnati, Ohio, United States. Located in the neighborhood of Riverside, it was originally home to lawyer and federal judge Daniel Thew Wright, and it has been named a historic site because of its distinctive architecture.

Daniel Thew Wright was a native of Riverside, born there in 1864, at which time it was still a separate municipality; he was the son of D. Thew Wright, a judge of the common pleas court for Hamilton County. After graduating from the University of Cincinnati College of Law in 1887, the younger Wright entered into private practice in Cincinnati before taking a succession of mayoral and judicial offices; he later served as a judge on the United States District Court for the District of Columbia before retiring. In 1895, while a common pleas court judge, Wright purchased land of his father in Riverside and soon began the construction of the present house.

Built of wood on a foundation of random stone, the Wright's house combines architectural components such as the Palladian window, Ionic capitals on the pilasters, dentils, and pediments atop the gables. Inside, elements such as the fireplace mantels and the doors and doorways demonstrate Neoclassical design influences on their trim. Taken together, these components produce a prominent example of the Colonial Revival style.

In 1982, the Wright House was listed on the National Register of Historic Places, qualifying both because of its place in local history and its historically significant architecture. It is one of two Register-listed houses on River Road (US 50) in Riverside, along with the substantially older Matthew McWilliams House a short distance to the east.
