= Apostolic Bethlehem Temple Church =

Historic church in Ohio, United States

- U.S. National Register of Historic Places
- U.S. Historic district – Contributing property
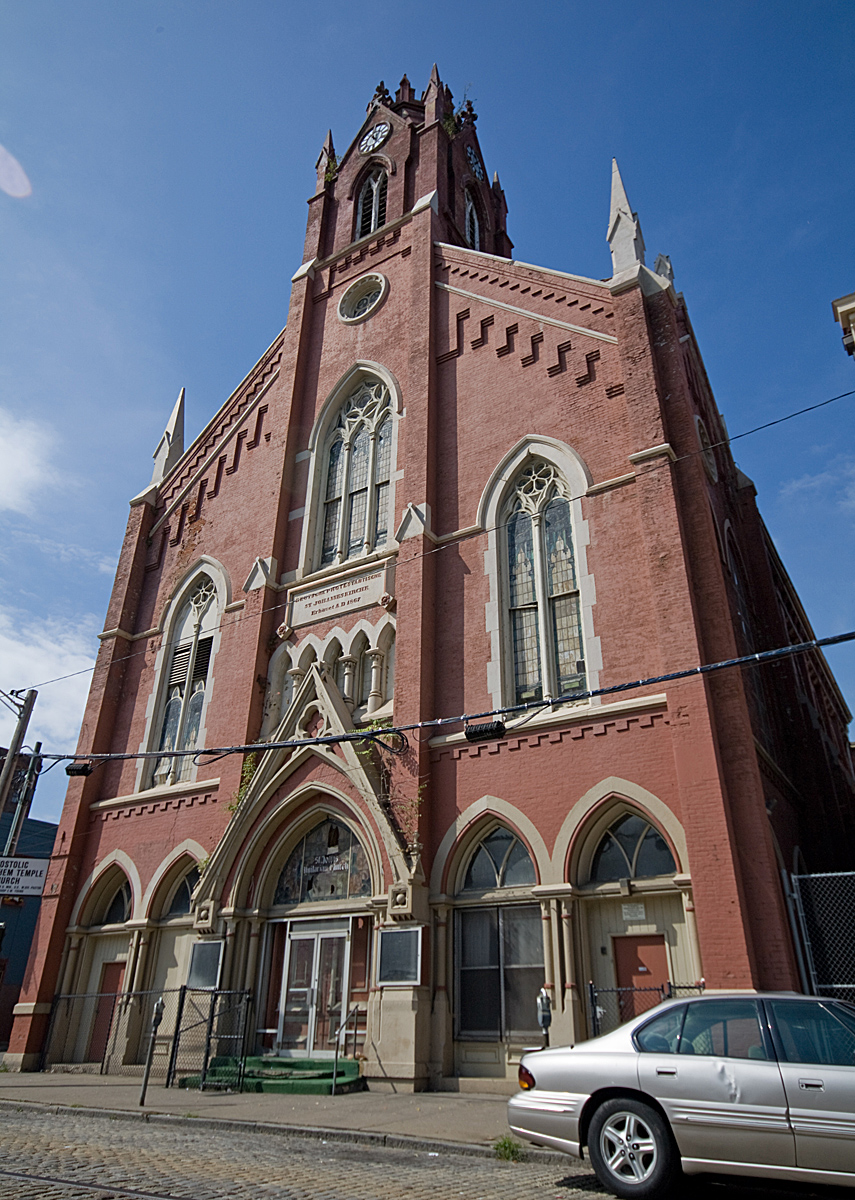
- Front of the church

- Location within Ohio Location within the United States
- Location: 1205 Elm St., Cincinnati, Ohio
- Coordinates: 39°6′29″N 84°31′7″W
- Area: Less than 1 acre (0.40 ha)
- Built: 1868
- Architectural style: German Gothic
- Part of: Over-the-Rhine Historic District (ID83001985)
- NRHP reference No.: 73001453
- Added to NRHP: April 11, 1973

The Apostolic Bethlehem Temple Church is a historic church building in the Over-the-Rhine neighborhood of Cincinnati, Ohio, United States. A German Gothic Revival structure built in 1868, it was constructed as the home of the German Evangelical and Reformed Church, Cincinnati's oldest German Reformed Church. Founded in 1814, the church changed its name to "St. John's German Protestant Church" in 1874, although it remained in the German Reformed Church. This situation continued until 1924, when it departed for the American Unitarian Association and changed its name to "St. John's Unitarian Church." Little more than twenty years later, the congregation abandoned its old building, leaving it vacant until it was purchased by the present owners, a Pentecostal church.

The church building is a rectangular two-story structure facing to the east. Worshippers enter through doors in a prominent tower that occupies the center of the façade. Such a tower is characteristic of the German Gothic churches that this church was built to emulate, as are the transepts on either side of the tower.

Located at 1205 Elm Street, the church lies on the edge of the city's Over-the-Rhine neighborhood. Among the properties surrounding it are Music Hall, located at 1243 Elm Street, and a community park whose southwestern corner lies on the other side of Elm Street. In 1973, the church was listed on the National Register of Historic Places because of its place in local history and because of its distinctive and well-preserved historic architecture. Ten years later, most of Over-the-Rhine was added to the Register as a historic district, and the Apostolic Bethlehem Temple Church qualified as one of its hundreds of contributing properties.
