= Melbourne Flats =

- U.S. National Register of Historic Places
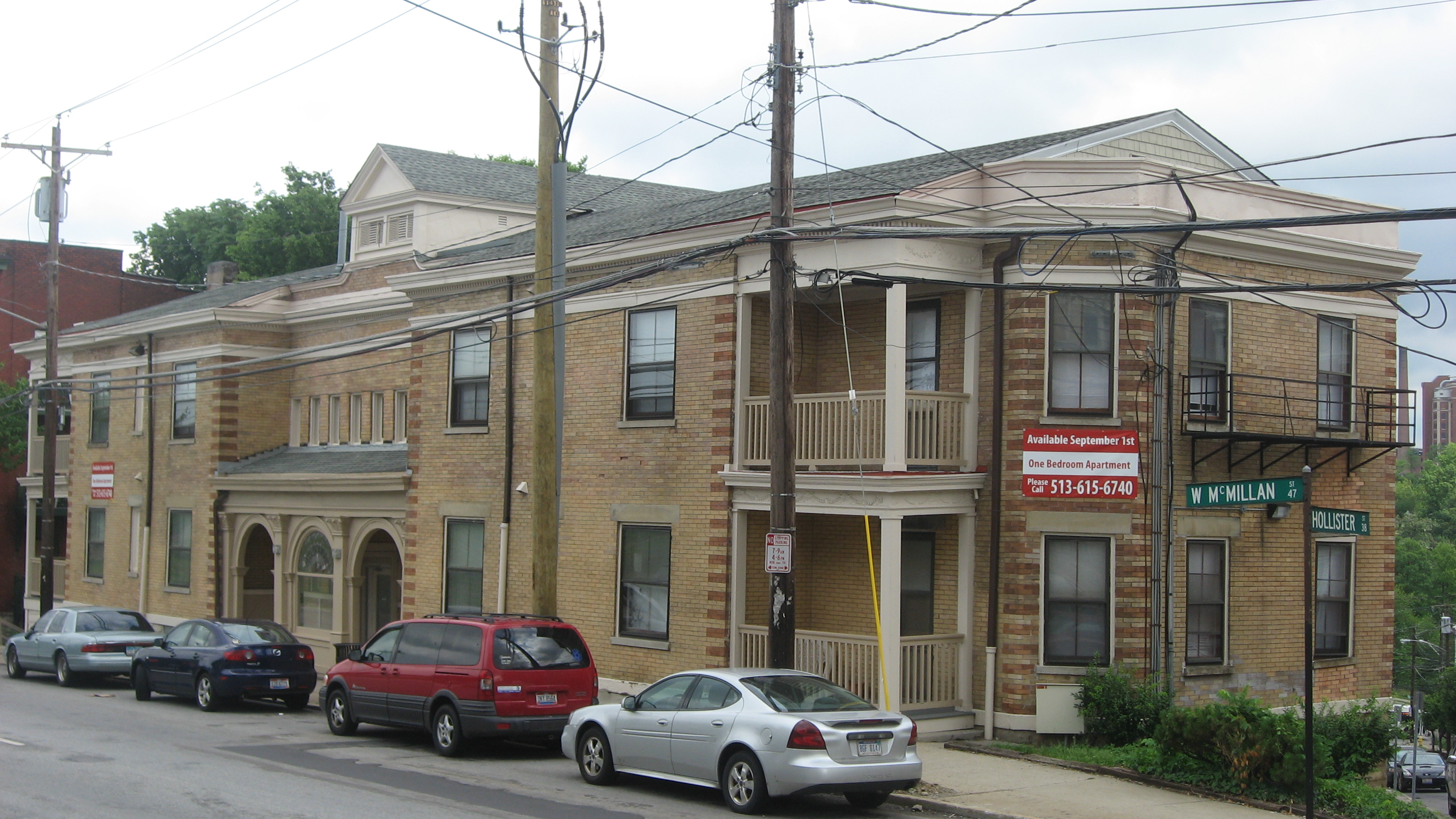
- Front of the flats

- Location within Ohio Location within the United States
- Location: Cincinnati, Ohio
- Coordinates: 39°7′38.72″N 84°30′47.88″W
- Architect: Joseph G. Steinkamp & Brothers and Joseph G. Steinkamp
- Architectural style: Late 19th and 20th Century Revivals, Classical Revival and Beaux-Arts
- NRHP reference No.: 84000132
- Added to NRHP: October 18, 1984

Melbourne Flats is a registered historic building in Cincinnati, Ohio, listed in the National Register on October 18, 1984.

== Historic uses ==
- Multiple Dwelling
