= St. Peter's Lick Run Historic District =

Historic district in Ohio, United States

- U.S. National Register of Historic Places
- U.S. Historic district
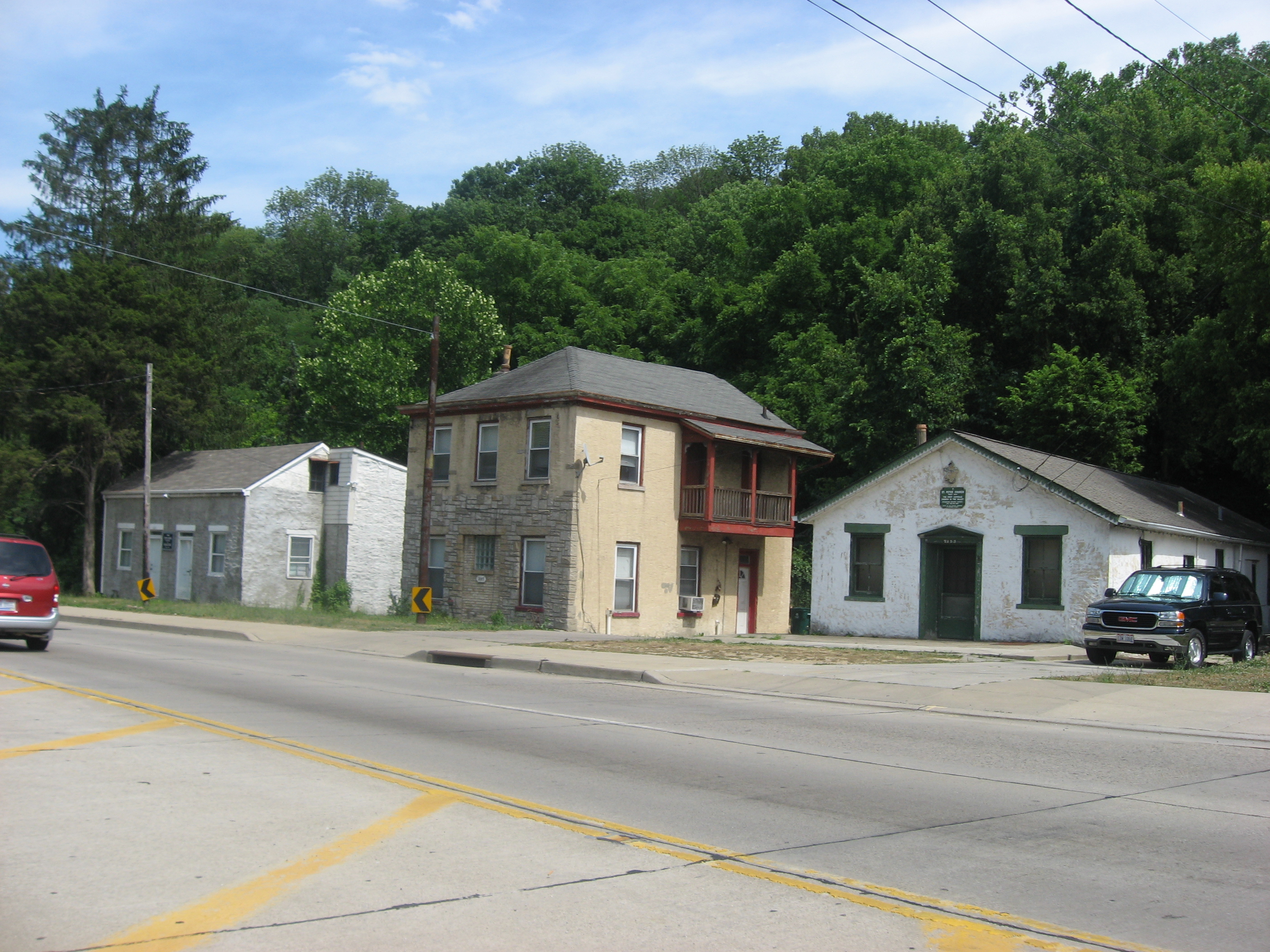
- Overview of the district

- Location within Ohio Location within the United States
- Location: 2145-2153 Queen City Ave., Cincinnati, Ohio
- Coordinates: 39°7′39″N 84°34′19″W
- Area: 30 acres (120,000 m^{2})
- Built: 1849
- Architect: Nicholas Schwab
- NRHP reference No.: 89001453
- Added to NRHP: October 4, 1989

St. Peter's Lick Run Historic District is a registered historic district in Cincinnati, Ohio, listed in the National Register of Historic Places on October 4, 1989. It contains 3 contributing buildings.

== Historic uses ==
- Single Dwelling
- Religious Structure
- Church School
