= George Hummel House =

Historic house in Ohio, United States

- U.S. National Register of Historic Places
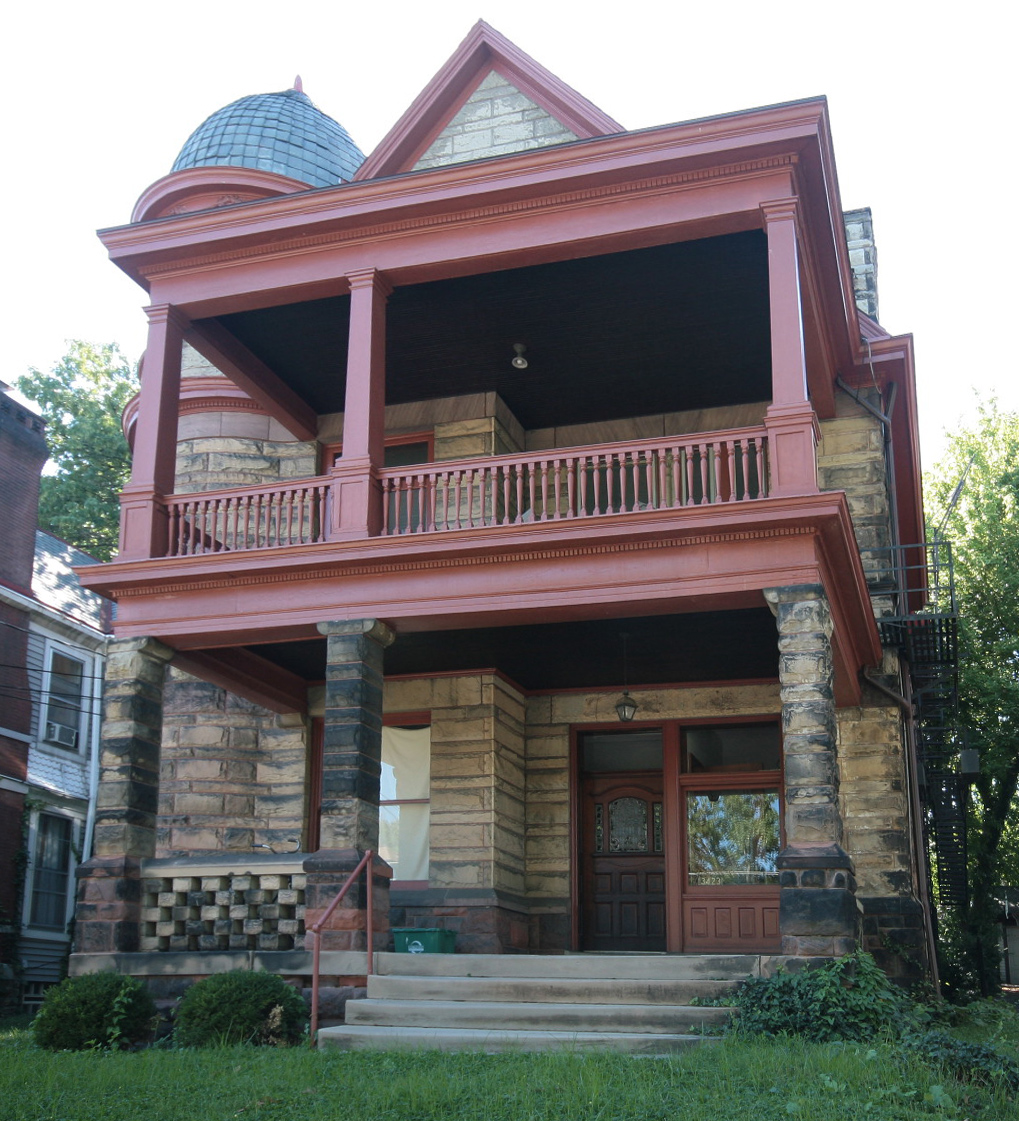
- Front of the house

- Location within Ohio Location within the United States
- Interactive map showing the location of George Hummel House
- Location: 3423 Whitfield Ave., Cincinnati, Ohio
- Coordinates: 39°8′42″N 84°31′25″W
- Area: Less than 1 acre (0.40 ha)
- Built: 1892
- Architect: Samuel Hannaford & Sons
- Architectural style: Victorian, Eclectic
- MPS: Samuel Hannaford and Sons TR in Hamilton County
- NRHP reference No.: 80003059
- Added to NRHP: March 3, 1980

The George Hummel House is a historic residence in the city of Cincinnati, Ohio, United States. Constructed in the early 1890s, it is built with numerous prominent components from different architectural styles, and it has been named a historic site.

Built of limestone, the Hummel House is covered with a slate roof and features elements of granite. It was built with an irregular and asymmetrical floor plan, including a prominent porch and a turret. The two-and-a-half-story facade is divided into three bays, with the turret on one of the corners; it dominates the appearance, with the two-story porch being the house's second most prominent feature. Uniformity is absent from the porch: ashlar was used for its first-story pillars, while the flat roof of the second story relies on spindled wooden columns and balustrade. Erected to be the home of George Hummel, the house features variety in its stonework: courses of small blocks alternate with courses of large blocks, while the foundation and water table are built of random stonework in multiple colors. These elements, together with the porch and turret, lend the house an eclectic appearance with influence from multiple styles common during the late Victorian period.

Constructed in 1892, the house was designed by master architect Samuel Hannaford. Between 1886 and 1896, Hannaford most favored eclectic designs for residences, and many of his surviving houses from the early 1890s were built with ashlar stone walls with clear courses. When the Hummel House was built, Hannaford was in the middle of the final stage of his career: in 1887 he had entered into partnership with two of his sons, and he retired from practice in 1897. Throughout his career, Hannaford produced buildings of numerous types, including numerous eclectic buildings as well as buildings in a wide range of standard styles.

In early 1980, the Hummel House was listed on the National Register of Historic Places, qualifying because of its well-preserved historic architecture. It was part of a group of more than fifty Hannaford-designed buildings added to the Register together as part of a multiple property submission.
