= McKinley School (Cincinnati, Ohio) =

- U.S. National Register of Historic Places
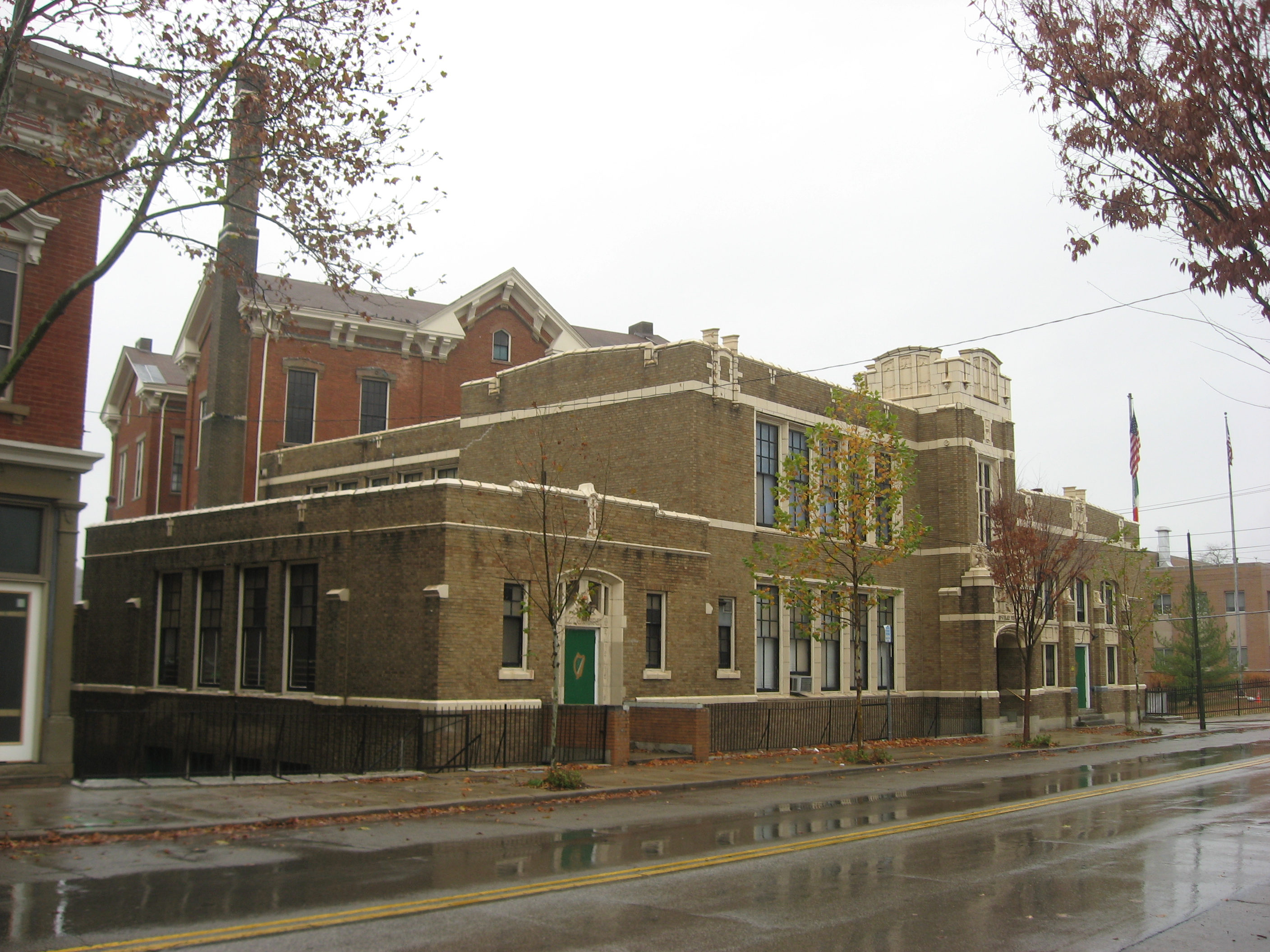
- Location: 3905 Eastern Ave., Cincinnati, Ohio
- Coordinates: 39°6′36.29″N 84°26′1.94″W
- MPS: Columbia-Tusculum MRA
- NRHP reference No.: 79002697
- Added to NRHP: August 24, 1979

McKinley School is a historic school building in the Columbia-Tusculum neighborhood of Cincinnati, Ohio. The building was originally built as the Twenty-Fourth District school in 1876 and known as the Pendleton House. The school contained 12 rooms and had seats for 780 pupils. The gothic revival annex facing Eastern Avenue, which contained four additional classrooms including a kindergarten, a gymnasium, and new main entrance was built in 1917 by architects Bausmith & Drainie. It was listed in the National Register of Historic Places on August 24, 1979. The school is currently occupied by the Irish Heritage Center of Cincinnati.
