= Westwood Town Center Historic District =

Historic district in Ohio, United States

- U.S. National Register of Historic Places
- U.S. Historic district
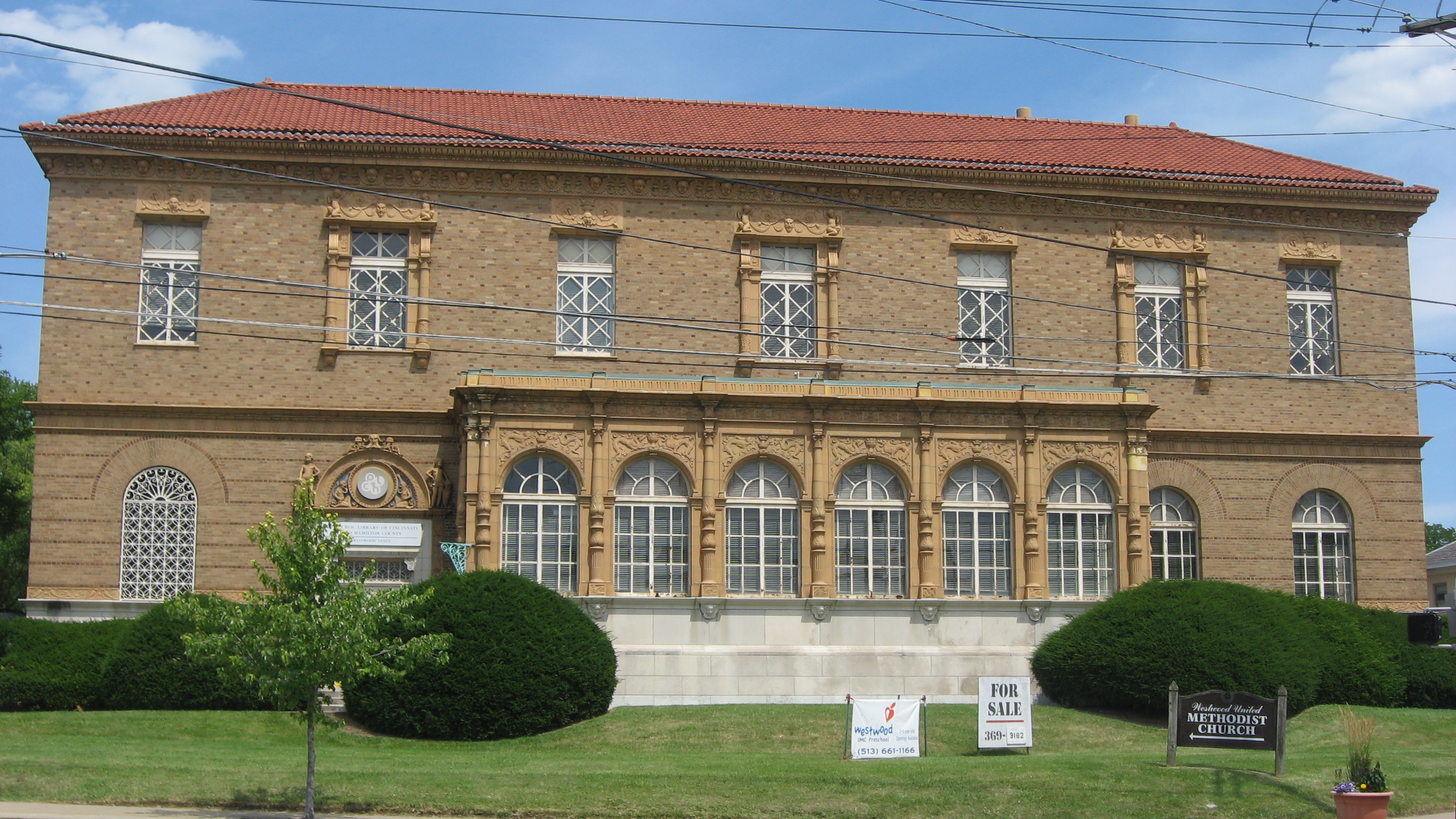
- Telephone exchange building

- Location within Ohio Location within the United States
- Location: Epworth and Harrison Aves., Cincinnati, Ohio
- Coordinates: 39°8′57″N 84°35′56″W
- Area: 115 acres (0.47 km^{2})
- Architect: Samuel Hannaford
- Architectural style: Gothic Revival, Queen Anne and Classical Revival
- NRHP reference No.: 74001515
- Added to NRHP: December 2, 1974

Westwood Town Center Historic District is a registered historic district in Cincinnati, Ohio, listed in the National Register of Historic Places on December 2, 1974. It contains 5 contributing buildings.
