= Eighteenth District School =

- U.S. National Register of Historic Places
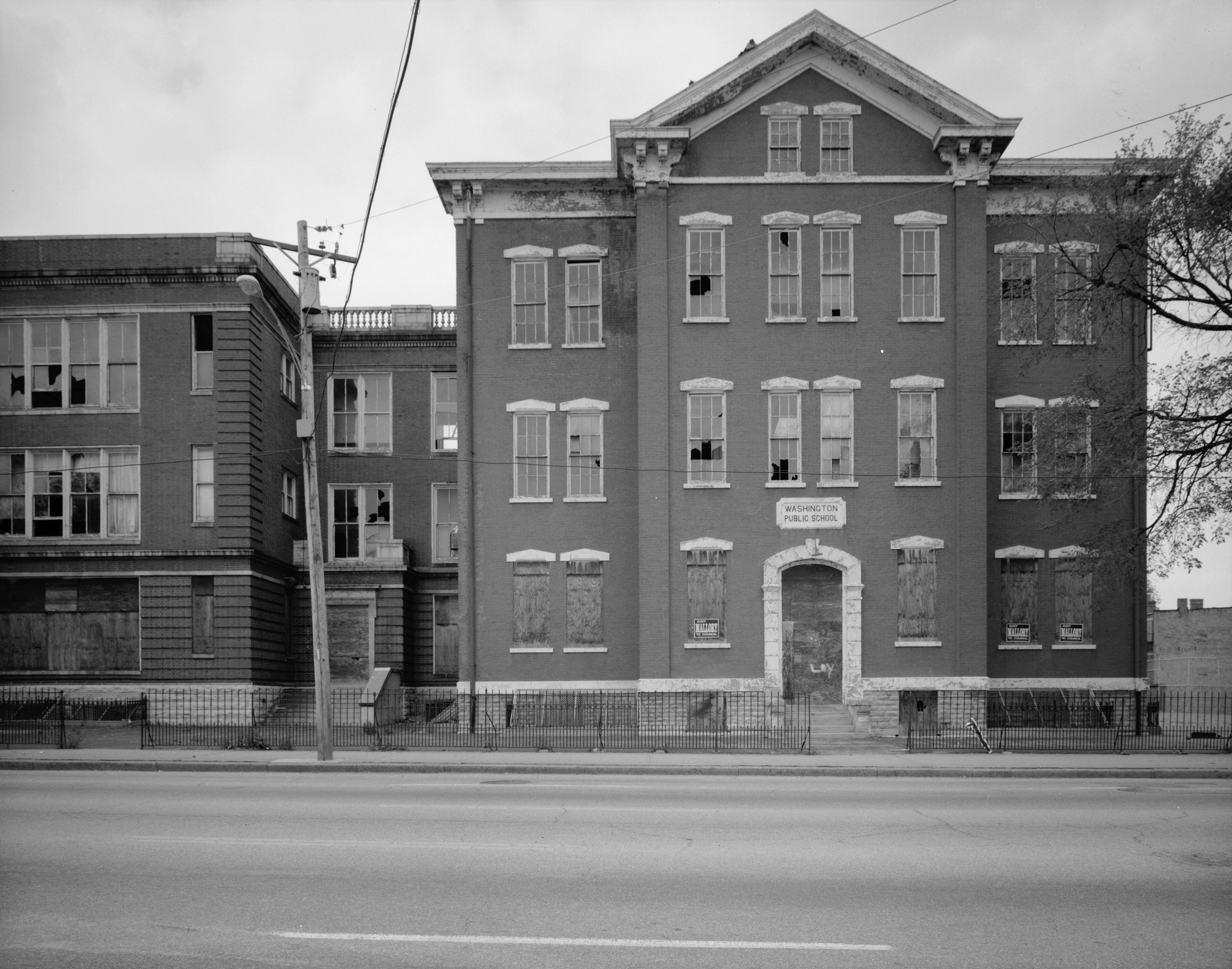
- Facade of 1882 part of school in 1990

- Location within Ohio Location within the United States
- Location: 1326 Hopple St., Cincinnati, Ohio
- Coordinates: 39°8′14″N 84°32′18″W
- Area: less than 1 acre (0.40 ha)
- Built: 1882, 1908
- Architect: Samuel Hannaford; Harry Bevis
- MPS: Samuel Hannaford & Sons TR (64000626)
- NRHP reference No.: 80003051
- Added to NRHP: 3 March 1980

The Eighteenth District School at one time also known as Washington Elementary School was a registered historic building in Cincinnati, Ohio.

== Description and history ==
The school was built in two sections the earlier in 1882 designed by Samuel Hannaford and Harry Bevis. It was listed in the National Register of Historic Places on March 3, 1980 as part of the Samuel Hannaford & Sons thematic resource. It is now demolished.

== Photo gallery ==
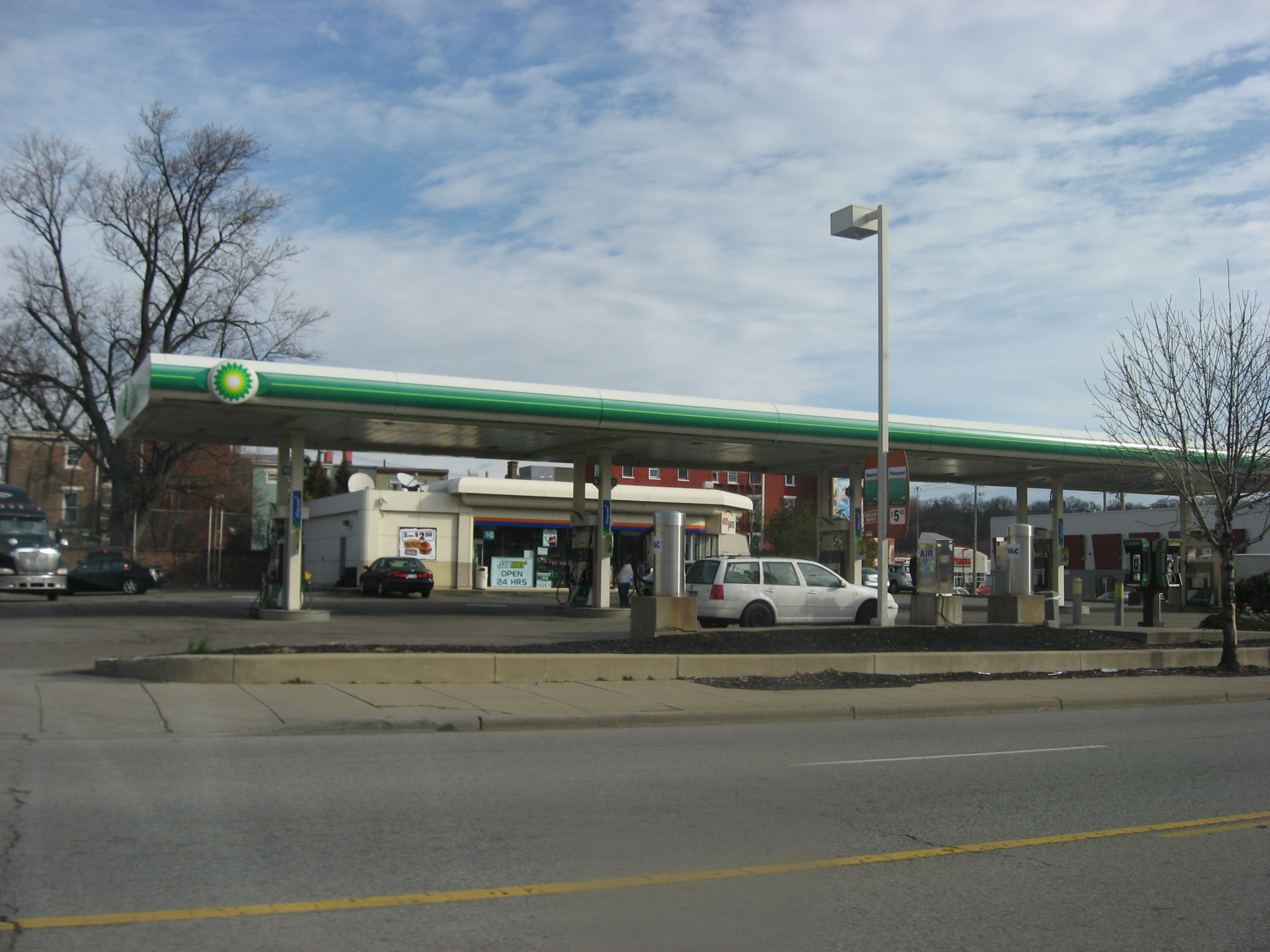
Site of the school in 2012

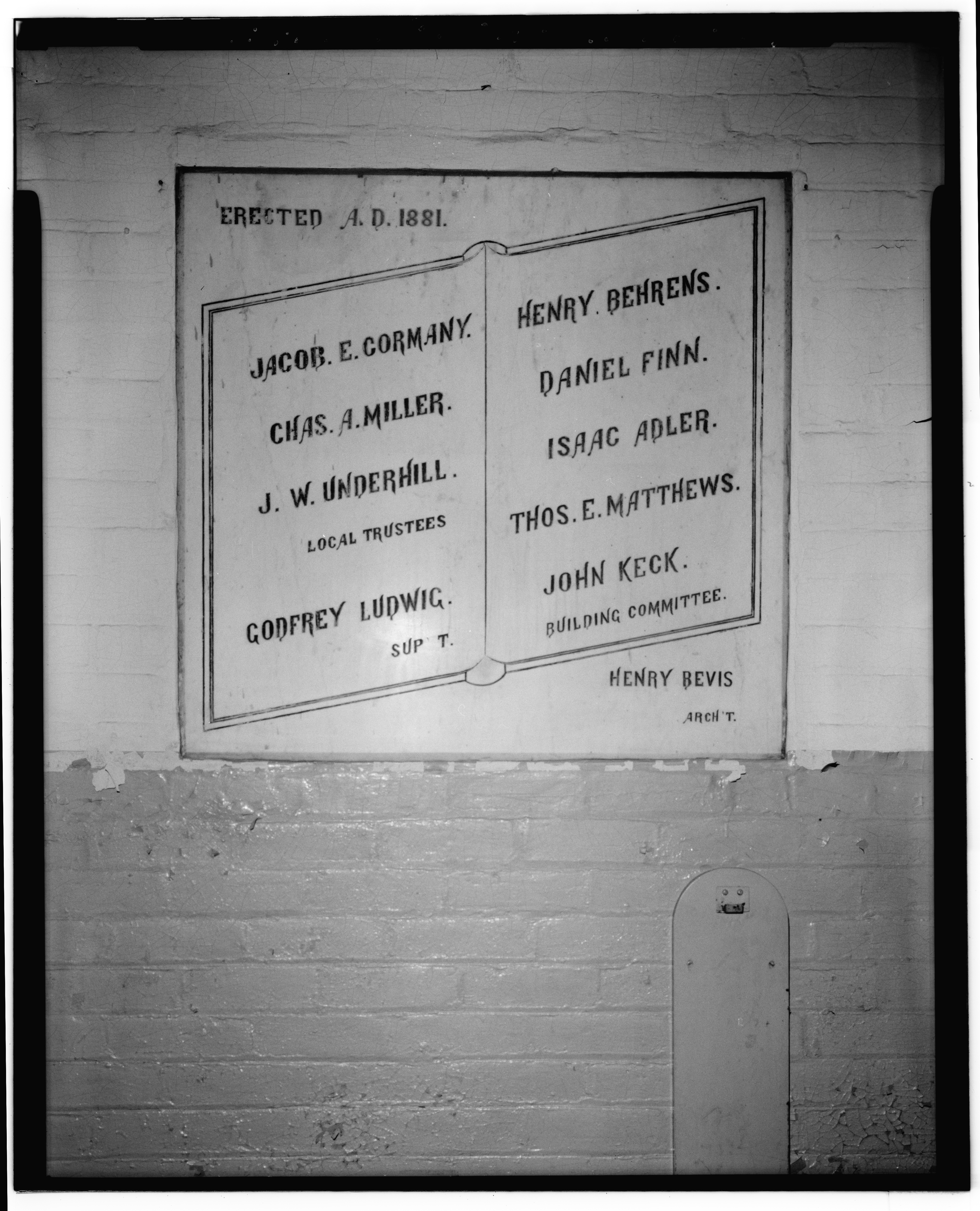
1881 dedication plaque (1990)

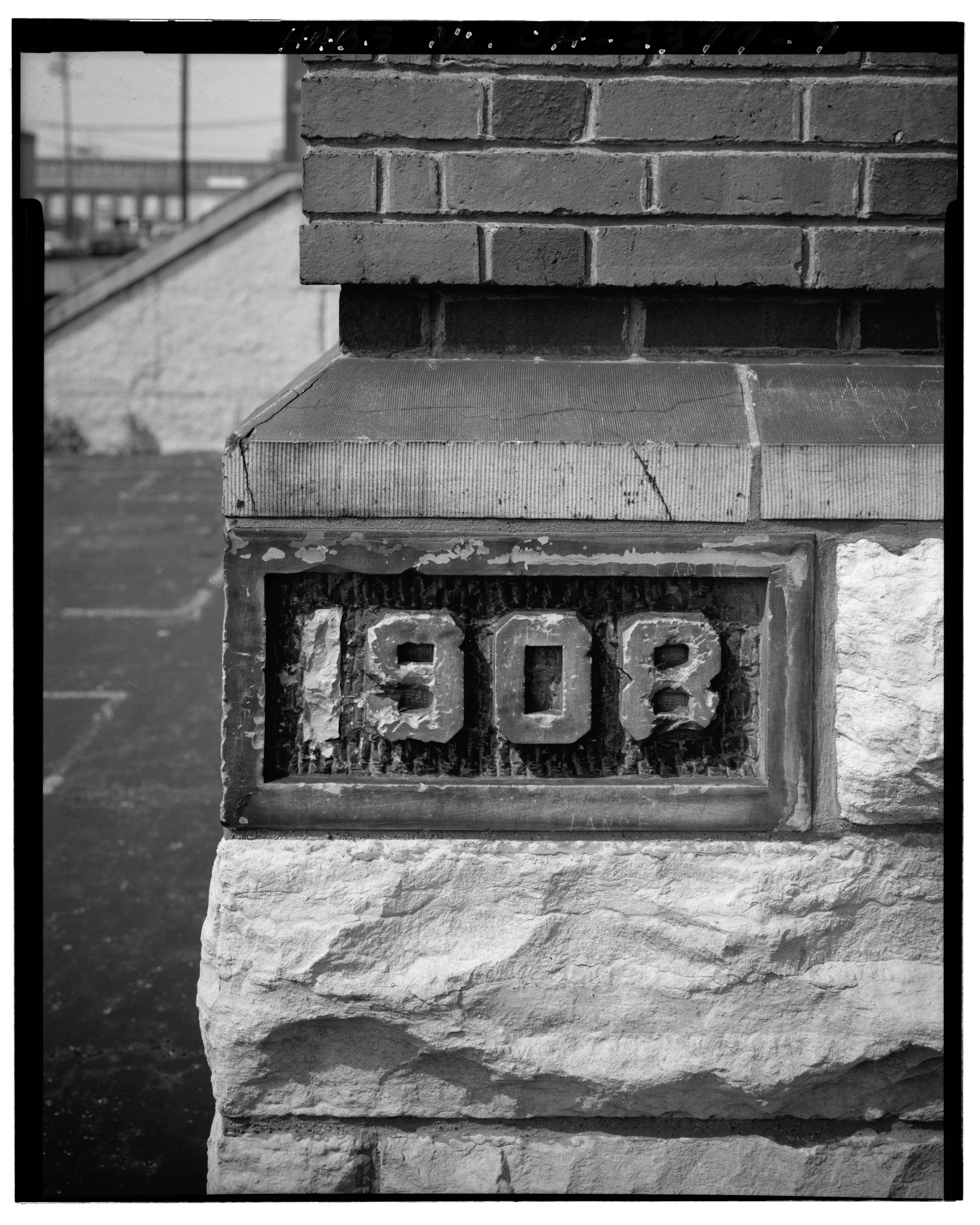
1908 cornerstone (1990)

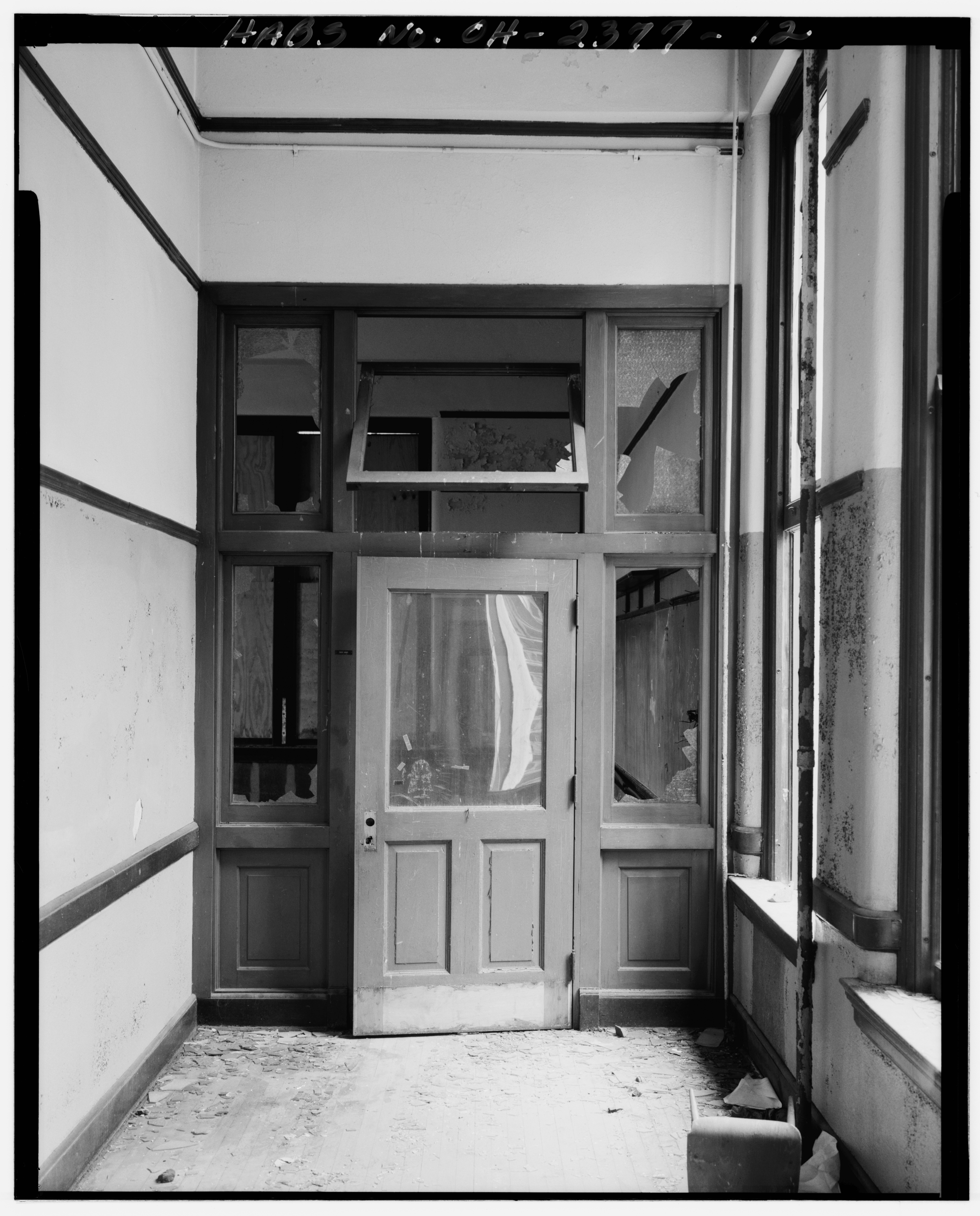
Interior doorway (1990)

== See also ==
- Historic preservation
- History of education in the United States
