= Clifton Avenue Historic District =

Historic district in Ohio, United States

- U.S. National Register of Historic Places
- U.S. Historic district
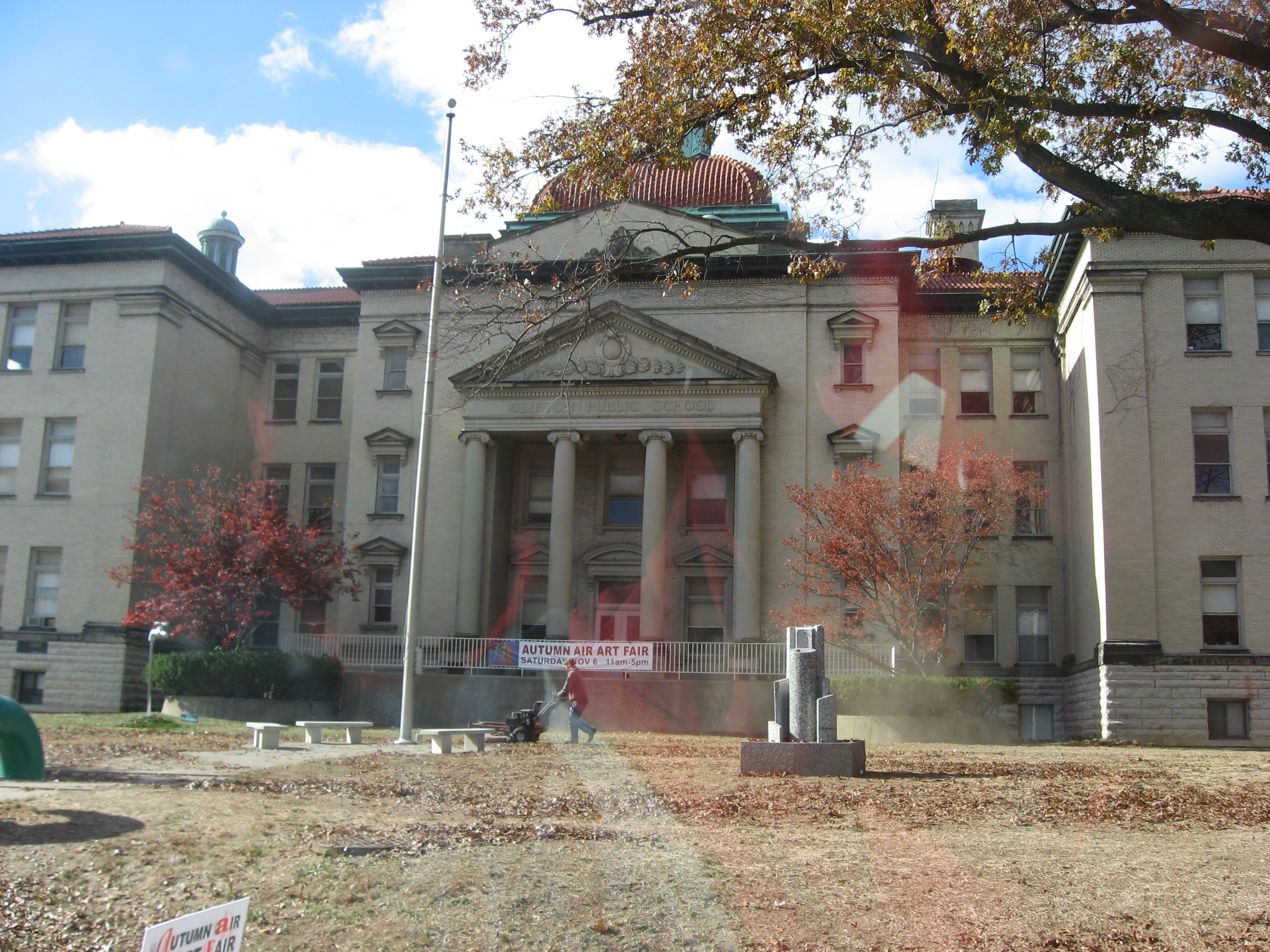
- The Clifton Avenue School, a major building in the district

- Location within Ohio Location within the United States
- Location: Irregular pattern along Clifton Avenue, Cincinnati, Ohio
- Coordinates: 39°9′18″N 84°31′1″W
- Built: 1843
- Architect: Charles Duhme
- Architectural style: Gothic Revival
- NRHP reference No.: 78002074
- Added to NRHP: December 8, 1978

Clifton Avenue Historic District is a registered historic district in the Clifton neighborhood of Cincinnati, Ohio, listed in the National Register on December 8, 1978. It contains 38 contributing buildings.

== Historic uses ==
- Single Dwelling
- School
- Religious Structure
