= Burnet Woods =

Public park in Cincinnati, Ohio

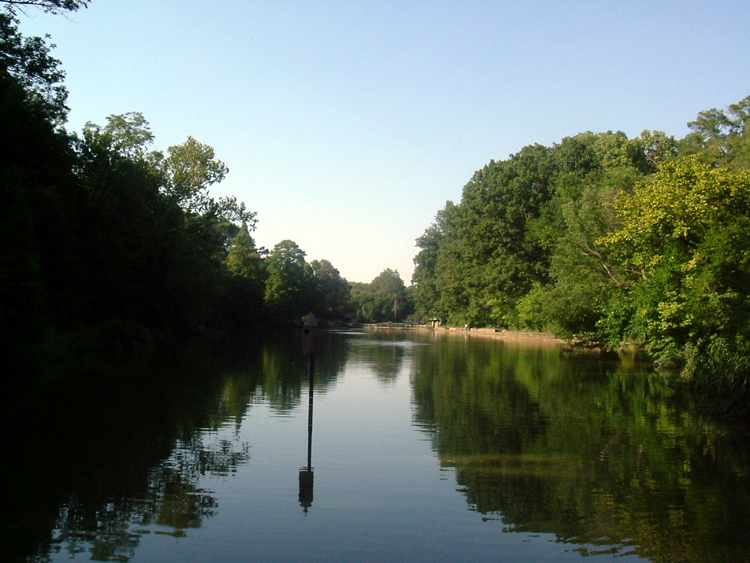
- Burnet Woods Lake
- Interactive map of Burnet Woods
- Type: Urban park
- Location: Cincinnati, Ohio, United States
- Coordinates: 39°08′19″N 84°31′00″W
- Area: 89.3 acres (361,000 m^{2})
- Created: 1872
- Owner: Cincinnati Park Board
- Open: 6:00 a.m. to 10:00 p.m.
- Public transit: Metro

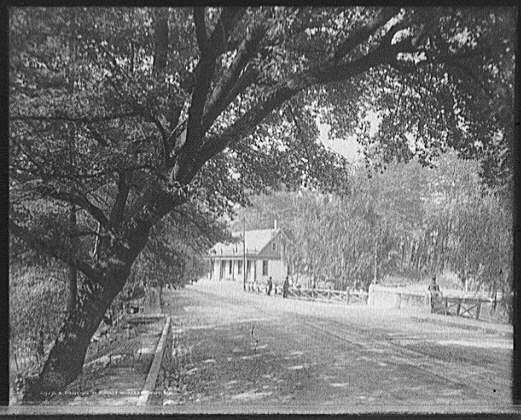
Burnet Woods as it appeared in 1906.

Burnet Woods, owned and operated by the Cincinnati Park Board, is an 89.3-acre (361,000 m^{2}) city park in Cincinnati, Ohio. The neighborhoods of Clifton and University Heights bound the park on three sides, while the University of Cincinnati west campus forms the southern border. Burnet Woods is bounded by Martin Luther King Drive on the south, Bishop Street on the east, Jefferson and Ludlow Avenues on the north, and Clifton Avenue on the west. Two streets — Brookline Avenue and Burnet Woods Drive — also pass through the park. The original park area was purchased by the city in 1872, and the landscape design was by Adolph Strauch. Additional purchases were made in 1881 and since. In 1875 an artificial lake was added. The park contains a bandstand constructed in 1911, The Lone Star Pavilion, Diggs Fountain Plaza, a playground area and the Trailside Nature Center (which houses Wolff Planetarium). The Trailside Nature Center was a museum originally constructed as part of the Works Progress Administration.

== Richardson Monument ==
Located along the southern edge of the park, at the intersection of Martin Luther King Drive and Brookline Avenue, the Richardson Monument was erected in 1972 by University of Cincinnati students. The sculpture, designed by architect Stephen J. Carter, is composed of 84 tons of carved pink granite that was salvaged from H.H. Richardson's Cincinnati Chamber of Commerce Building. The Chamber of Commerce was built in 1889 at the southwest corner of 4th street and Vine Street in downtown Cincinnati, but was destroyed by a fire twenty-two years later in 1911. The site of Richardson's building is now the location of Fourth and Vine Tower (built 1913).
