= Calvary Episcopal Church (Cincinnati) =

- Calvary Episcopal Church Sunday School
- U.S. National Register of Historic Places
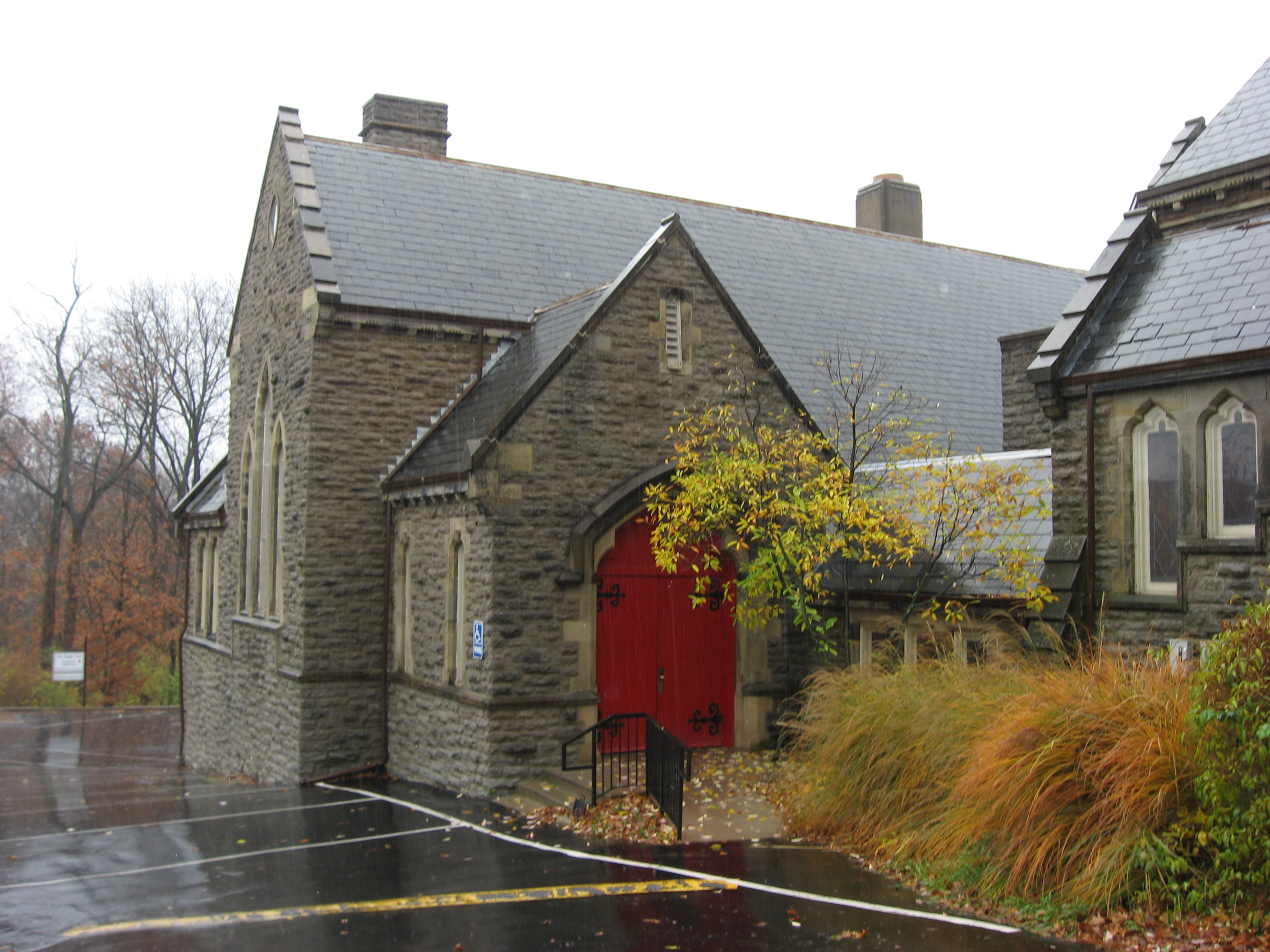
- Main entrance to Hannaford Hall

- Location within Ohio Location within the United States
- Location: Cincinnati, Ohio
- Coordinates: 39°9′8″N 84°31′3.08″W
- Architect: Samuel Hannaford & Sons
- NRHP reference No.: 80003040
- Added to NRHP: March 3, 1980

The Calvary Episcopal Church is located at 3766 Clifton Avenue, in the Clifton. It is part of the Clifton Avenue Historic District. Its Sunday School is a historic building listed in the National Register on March 3, 1980.

In 2019, the church reported 323 members; in 2023, it reported 436 members. No membership statistics were reported in 2024 national parochial reports. Plate and pledge financial support reported by the church in 2023 was $267,614. Average Sunday Attendance (ASA) reported in 2024 was 123 persons. This was a small decrease on ASA of 141 in 2015.

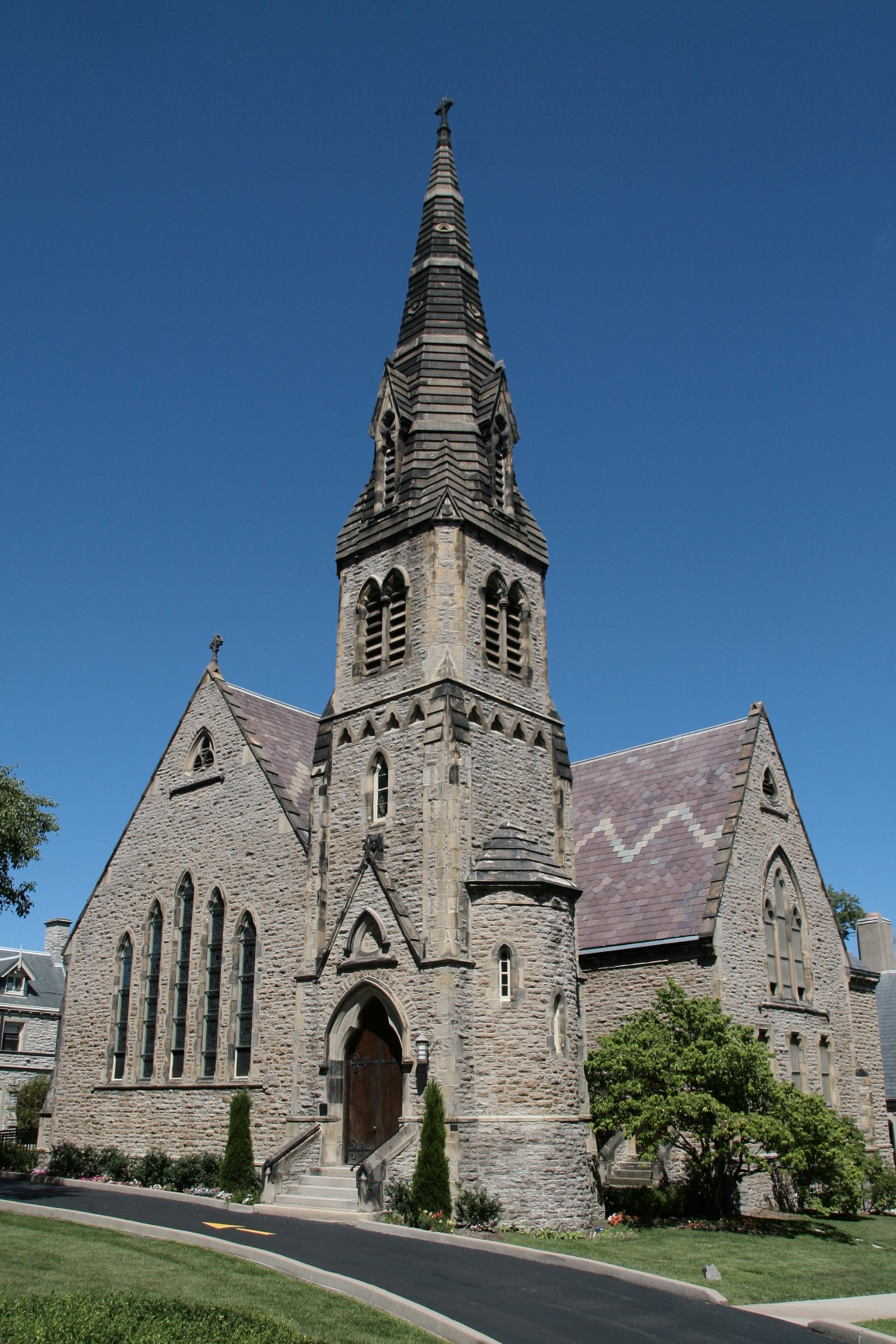
Front of the church

== History ==
Calvary Episcopal Church began in a small, frame schoolhouse on the eastern side of Clifton Avenue. The first services were held in 1844. Four years later, a frame church was built at the northwest corner of Clifton and Lafayette Avenue and was named "The Clifton Chapel". The "Calvery" church was incorporated in 1863 according to the statutes of the State of Ohio. Construction began in 1866 and was completed in 1867, the first building committee chairman was Henry Probasco. Construction cost was approximately $88,300.

The Gothic Revival style of the church was complementary to the mansions of the neighborhood. The tower and bell were donated by Mr. and Mrs. Henry Probasco in memory of their brother, Tyler Davidson. Other church memorials include the names of the Shoenbergers, the Probascos, the Resors, the Neaves and the Bowlers.

It is one of several places associated with architect Samuel Hannaford that were listed on the National Register as part of a 1978 Thematic Resource study.

== Notable people ==
- Hulda Regina Graser (1870-1943), Canadian-born American customs house broker, was a parishioner
