= Mount Storm Park =

Park in Cincinnati, Ohio, United States

Coordinates: 39°9′20″N 84°32′0″W

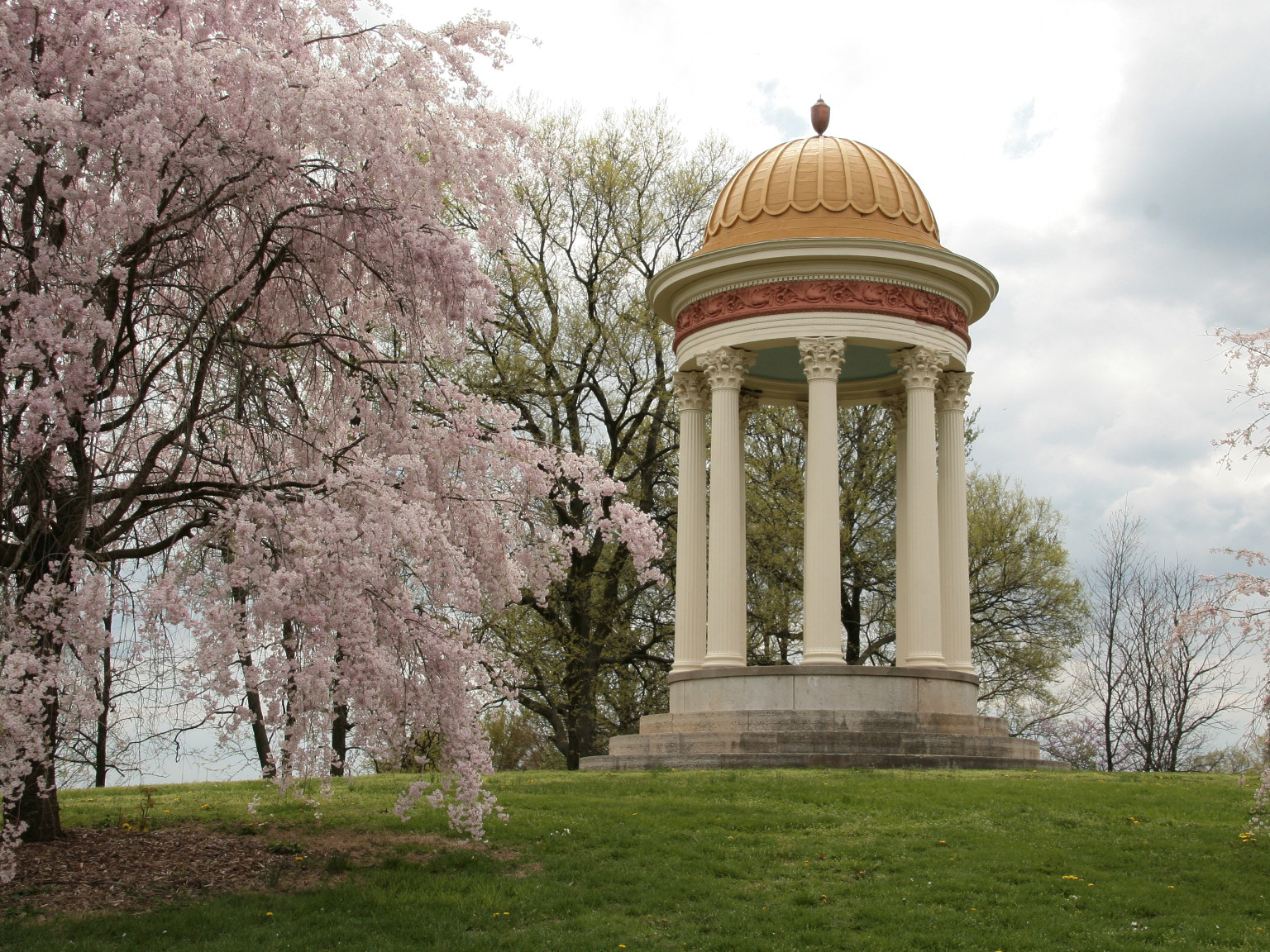
"Temple of Love" Pergola

Mount Storm Park is a City of Cincinnati municipal park situated on a 59-acre (24 ha) site on the western slope of a hill overlooking the Mill Creek Valley.

In the mid-19th century the property comprised the site of the estate of Robert Bonner Bowler, a dry goods entrepreneur and one-time Mayor of the Cincinnati neighborhood of Clifton. While visiting in Austria, Bowler met Adolph Strauch of the Vienna Imperial Gardens and invited him to visit if he came to America. Strauch did visit during a scheduled train layover and remained to develop the Bowler Estate.

"Mr. Strauch designed the Temple of Love in 1845, which still stands as an outstanding landmark to Mt. Storm today. The white columns of this Corinthian style pergola, which can be seen on the east lawn, was once the cover for a reservoir that supplied water to Mr. Bowler's seventeen greenhouses, gardens, orchards, and a waterfall and swan lake on which seven black swans swam."

Bowler hosted a number of prominent guests at the estate including Edward, Prince of Wales, later King of England, and Charles Dickens.

The property was sold to the City of Cincinnati in 1911. In 1917, the 1846 Victorian mansion was razed and the site used as a parking lot. Other than the pergola, the only remaining artifact of the Bowler estate is the wine cellar. In 1938, the Clifton Garden Club restored the "Temple of Love" and surrounding gardens.

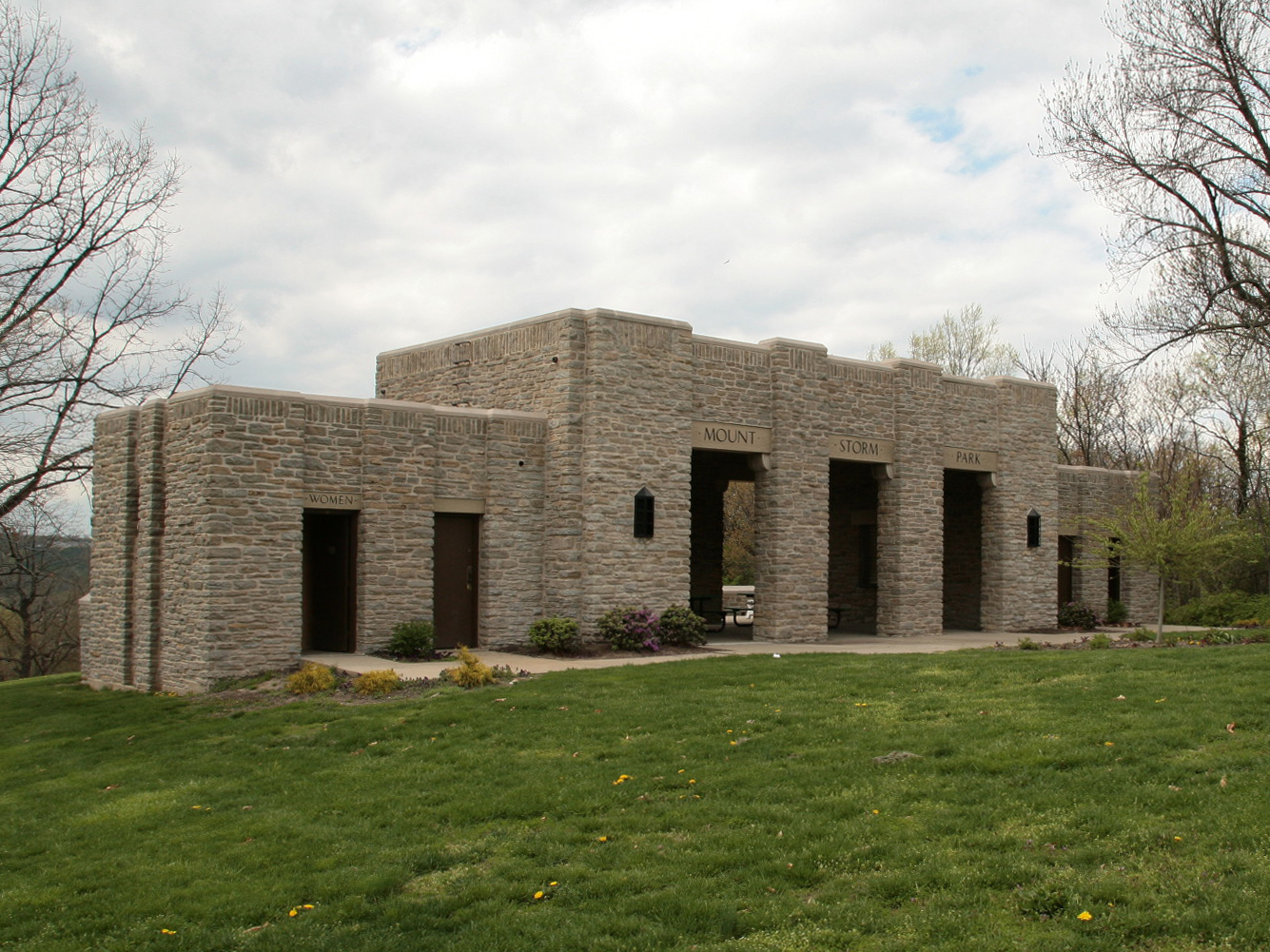
Mount Storm Shelter

Mount Storm Park's stone shelter or pavilion, built in 1935, overlooks the Mill Creek valley. The building was designed by Samuel Hannaford & Sons and is characterized by the lack of ornament typical of "Depression Modern". The shelter building was built by Cincinnati contractor Holt & Reichard, Inc.
