= Clifton, Cincinnati =

Coordinates: 39°9′0″N 84°31′12″W

Clifton
- Neighborhood of Cincinnati
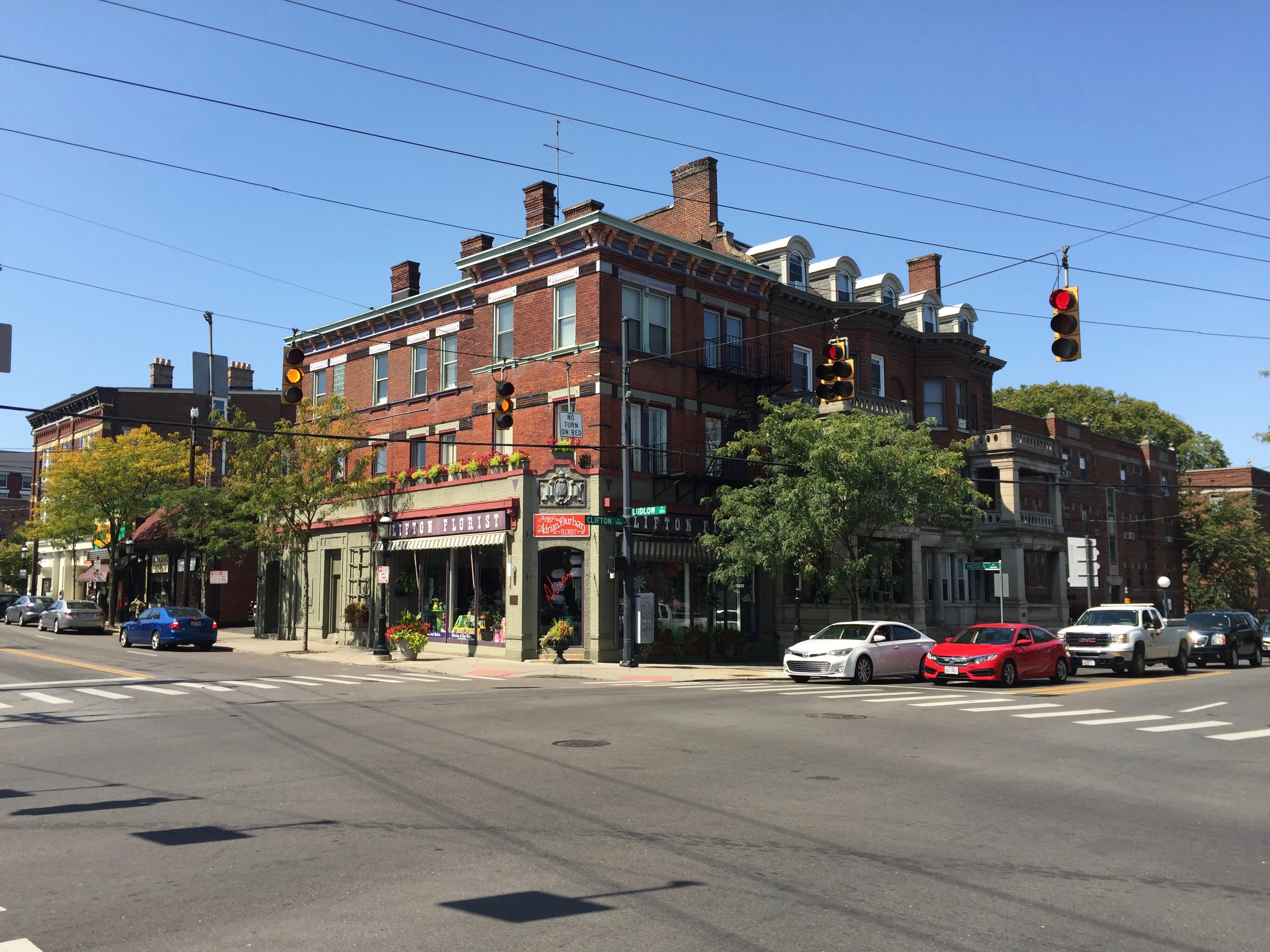
- The Clifton Gaslight District

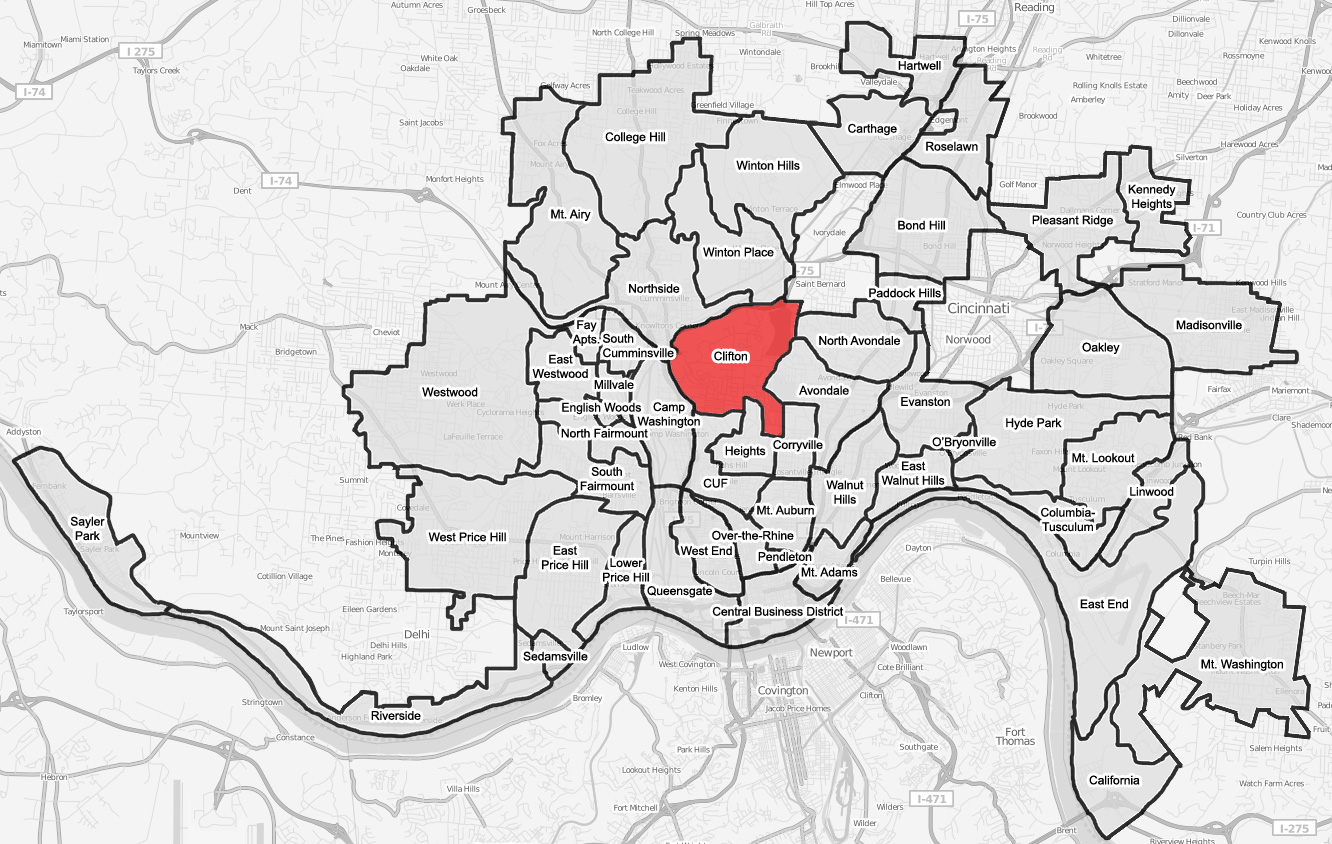
- Clifton (red) within Cincinnati, Ohio.
- Country: United States
- State: Ohio
- City: Cincinnati

Population (2020)
  - Total: 8,408
- Time zone: UTC-5 (EST)
  - Summer (DST): UTC-4 (EDT)
- ZIP code: 45316

Clifton is one of the 52 neighborhoods of Cincinnati, Ohio. The population was 8,408 in the 2020 census.

The area includes the Ludlow Avenue Shopping and Dining District. Clifton is situated around Clifton Avenue, north of Dixmyth Avenue, approximately three miles north of Downtown Cincinnati. Several historic buildings and homes remain in the neighborhood. Clifton was developed in large part due to the expansion of the street car system in the 1880s-1890s. Adjacent areas such as Corryville and the CUF neighborhoods are often erroneously referred to as Clifton, even by long-term residents.

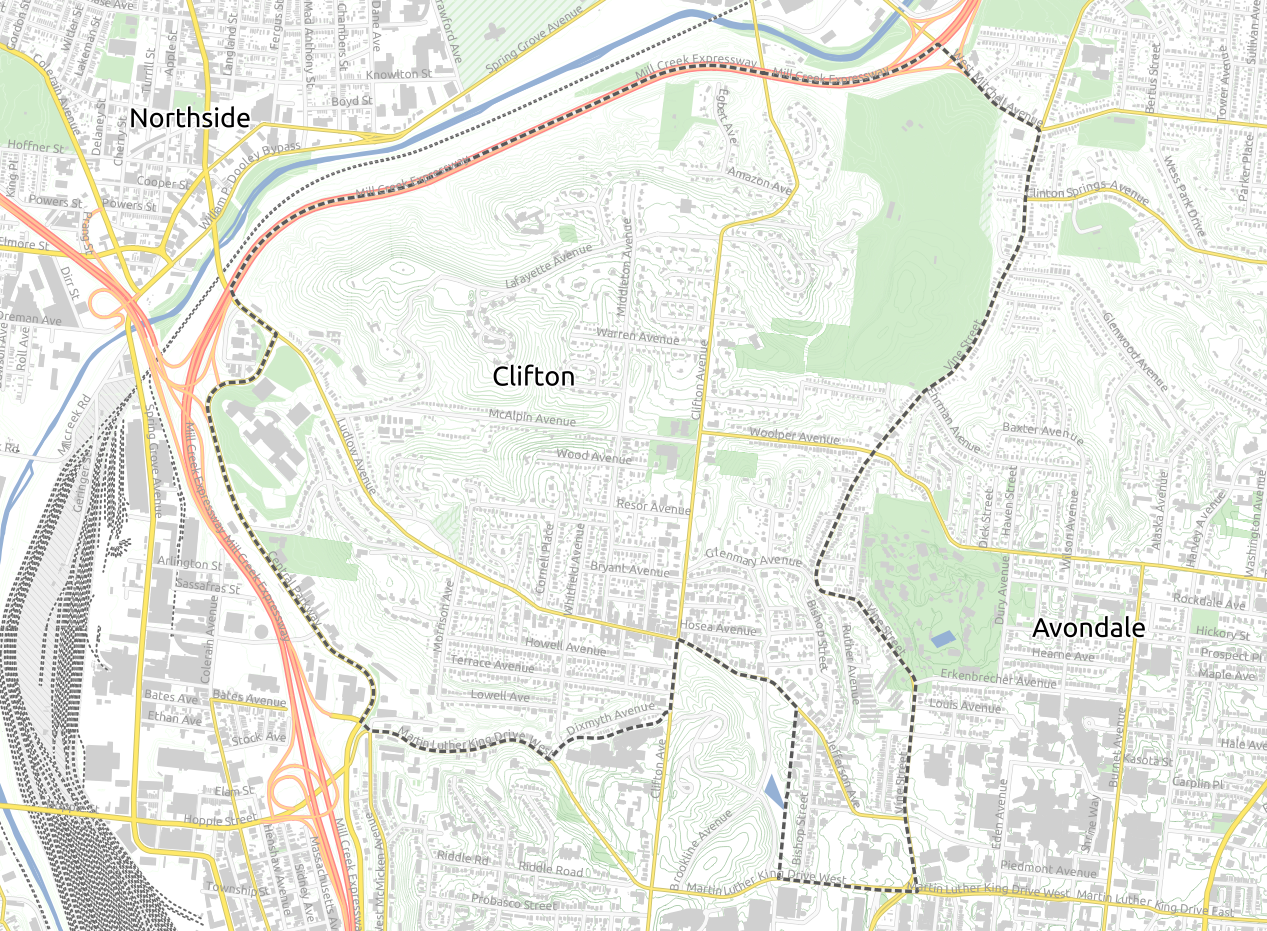
Map of Clifton

== History ==
Clifton was incorporated as a village in 1850. The village took its name from the Clifton farm, which contained 1,200 acres (4.9 km^{2}) of hills and dales. In the nineteenth century, mansions set in extensive grounds of gardens, parkland and woodlands dominated the northern section of Clifton, farther from the city. Their gates and gatehouses were spaced at intervals along Lafayette Avenue. In the southern section, denser settlement flanked a growing business district along Ludlow Avenue, centered on its juncture with Clifton Avenue.

Many of the estate grounds were designed by the landscape designer Adolph Strauch, who served as the Superintendent of Spring Grove Cemetery and Arboretum in the 1850s, who later revised plantings when estates became public parkland, such as Eden Park and the 89 acres (360,000 m^{2}) of Burnet Woods, the former property of Jacob Burnet.

The estates have found new uses in the twentieth century, or have been demolished, like Alexander McDonald's baronial mansion designed by Samuel Hannaford, the pre-eminent estate architect in later nineteenth-century Cincinnati; it was demolished in the 1960s to make way for an annex to the Clifton School: only a 150-year-old yew (Taxus cuspidata capitata) on the grounds of Fairview-Clifton German Language School and the carriage house remain.

The city of Cincinnati annexed Clifton in 1893. The University of Cincinnati relocated to Burnet Woods Park. Today the university is located in Clifton Heights, University Heights, Avondale, and Corryville, neighborhoods that surround Clifton. This entire area is often generically (and incorrectly) referred to as "Clifton" despite being several distinct and separate neighborhoods. Hebrew Union College, which settled near the university, and the Sacred Heart Academy in Clifton helped to contribute to the intellectual and bohemian atmosphere of the neighborhood.

== Demographics ==
Population of Clifton 1900-2020
Year	Pop.	±%
1900	2,750	—
1910	4,375	+59.1%
1920	5,450	+24.6%
1930	7,996	+46.7%
1940	8,340	+4.3%
1950	9,205	+10.4%
1960	9,635	+4.7%
1970	10,736	+11.4%
1980	9,240	−13.9%
1990	8,978	−2.8%
2000	8,546	−4.8%
2010	8,304	−2.8%
2020	8,408	+1.3%

As of the census of 2020, there were 8,408 people living in the neighborhood. There were 4,653 housing units. The racial makeup of the neighborhood was 62.7% White, 16.0% Black or African American, 0.3% Native American, 12.7% Asian, 0.0% Pacific Islander, 1.5% from some other race, and 6.8% from two or more races. 4.0% of the population were Hispanic or Latino of any race.

There were 4,118 households, out of which 40.2% were families. 46.4% of all households were made up of individuals.

16.4% of the neighborhood's population were under the age of 18, 70.9% were 18 to 64, and 12.7% were 65 years of age or older. 51.2% of the population were male and 48.8% were female.

According to the U.S. Census American Community Survey, for the period 2016-2020 the estimated median annual income for a household in the neighborhood was $52,473. About 5.3% of family households were living below the poverty line. About 70.2% had a bachelor's degree or higher.

== Culture ==
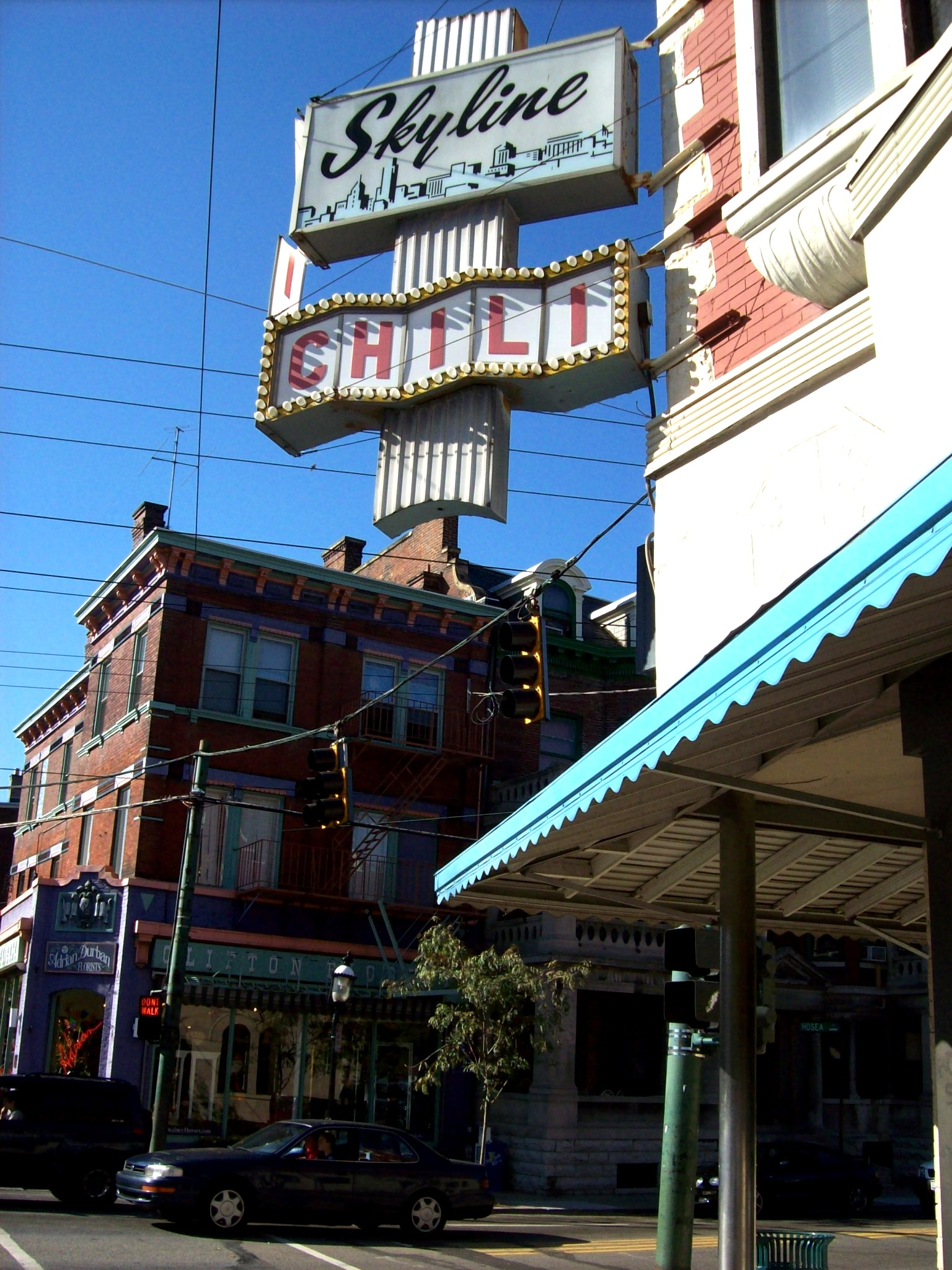
Skyline Chili parlor on the corner of Clifton and Ludlow Aves.

The Ludlow Avenue business district was designated Cincinnati's first "Main Street neighborhood" in a program sponsored by the National Trust for Historic Preservation; the Gaslight District contains many independent shops, restaurants and a movie theater specializing in independent and foreign films. Side streets are lit using original gas lamps, hence the name "Gaslight District." There is a great diversity of retail outlets and dining and drinking establishments situated along Ludlow and intersecting streets. Businesses include the historic rock concert hall the Ludlow Garage where the Allman Brothers recorded their famous album “Live at the Ludlow Garage,” and Ludlow Wines, the oldest wine shop in Cincinnati.

== Notable people ==
- Hulda Regina Graser (1870-1943), Canadian-born American customs house broker

== Gallery ==
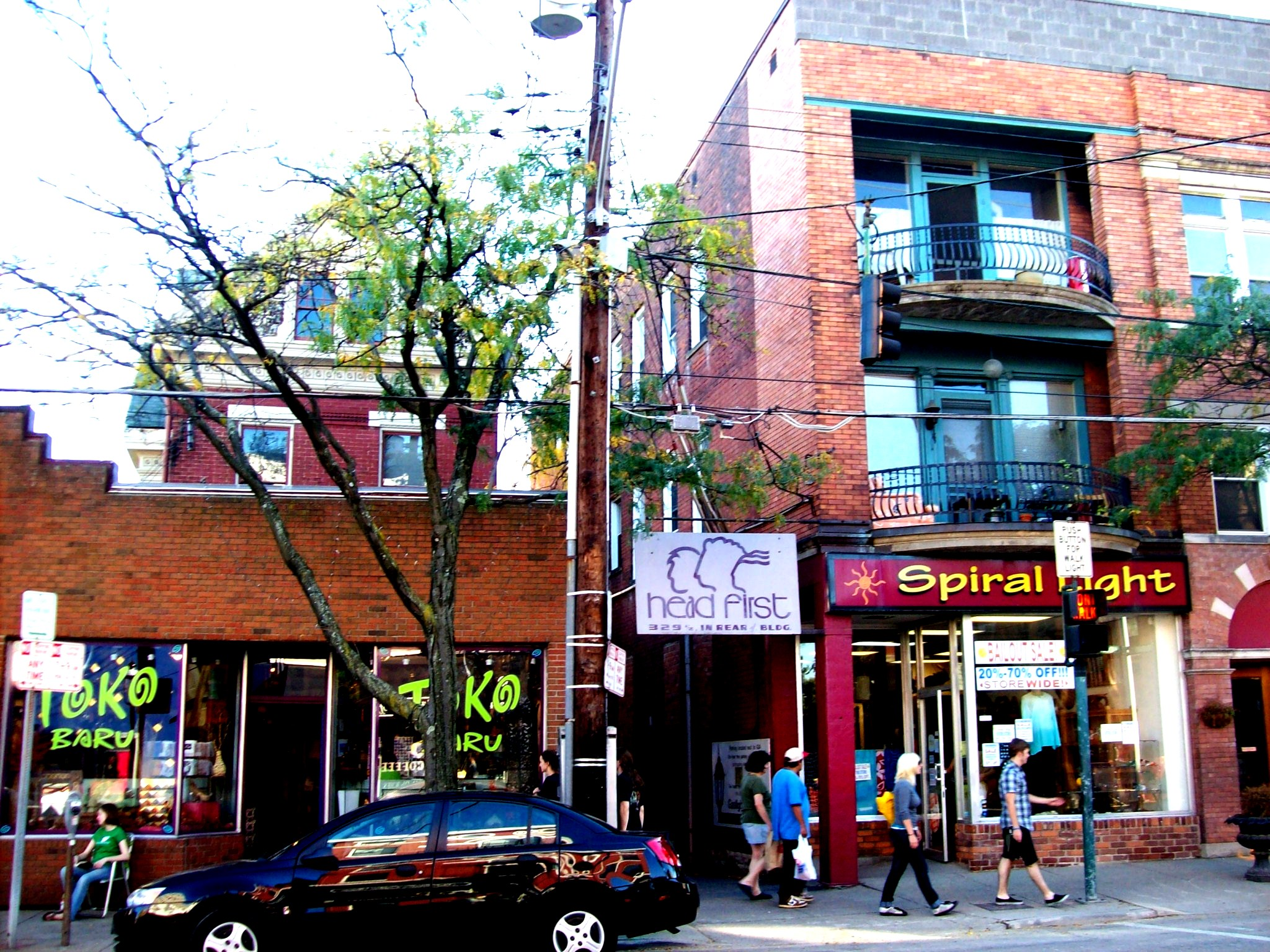
Ludlow Avenue Business District

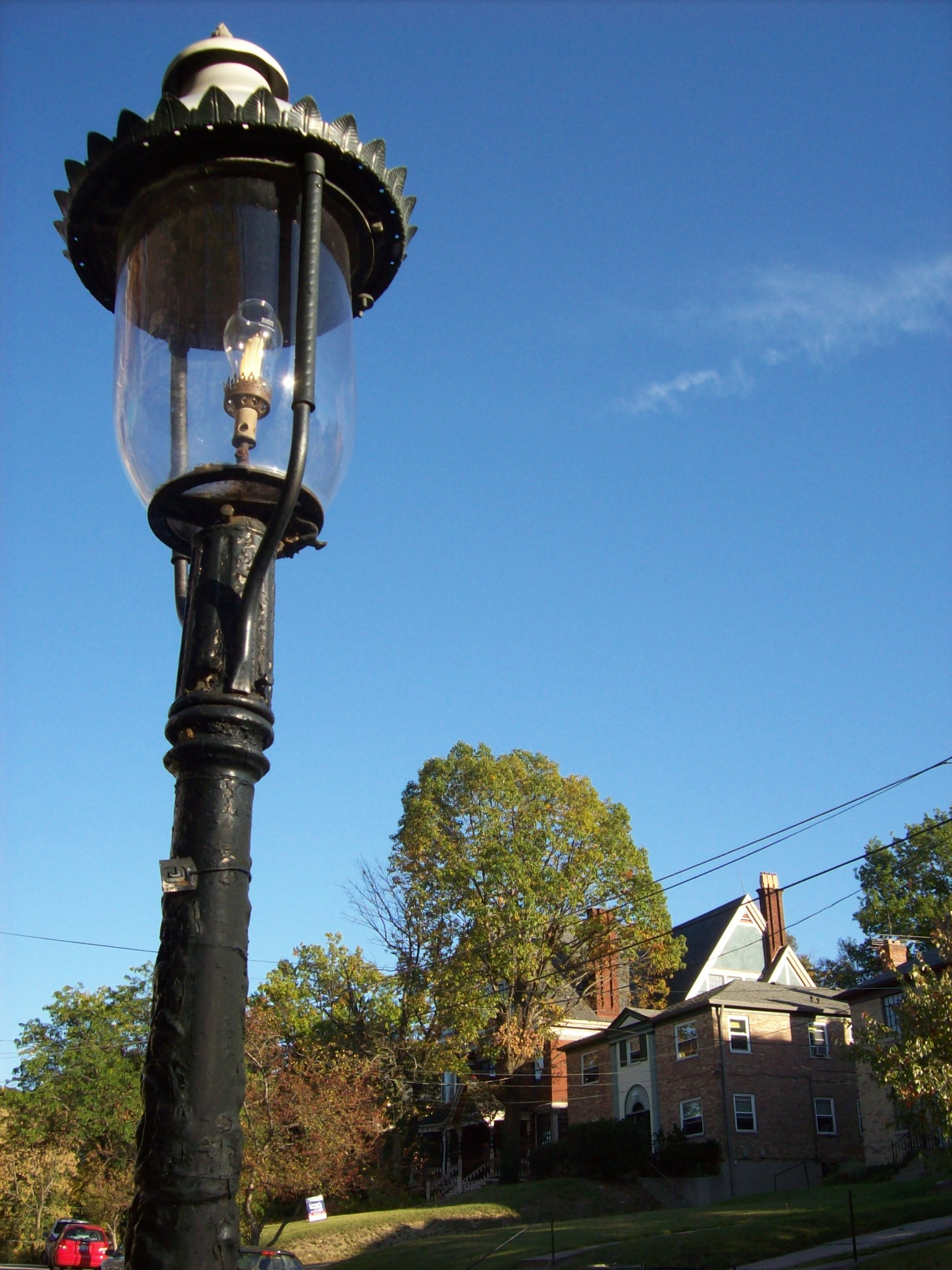
Gaslamp

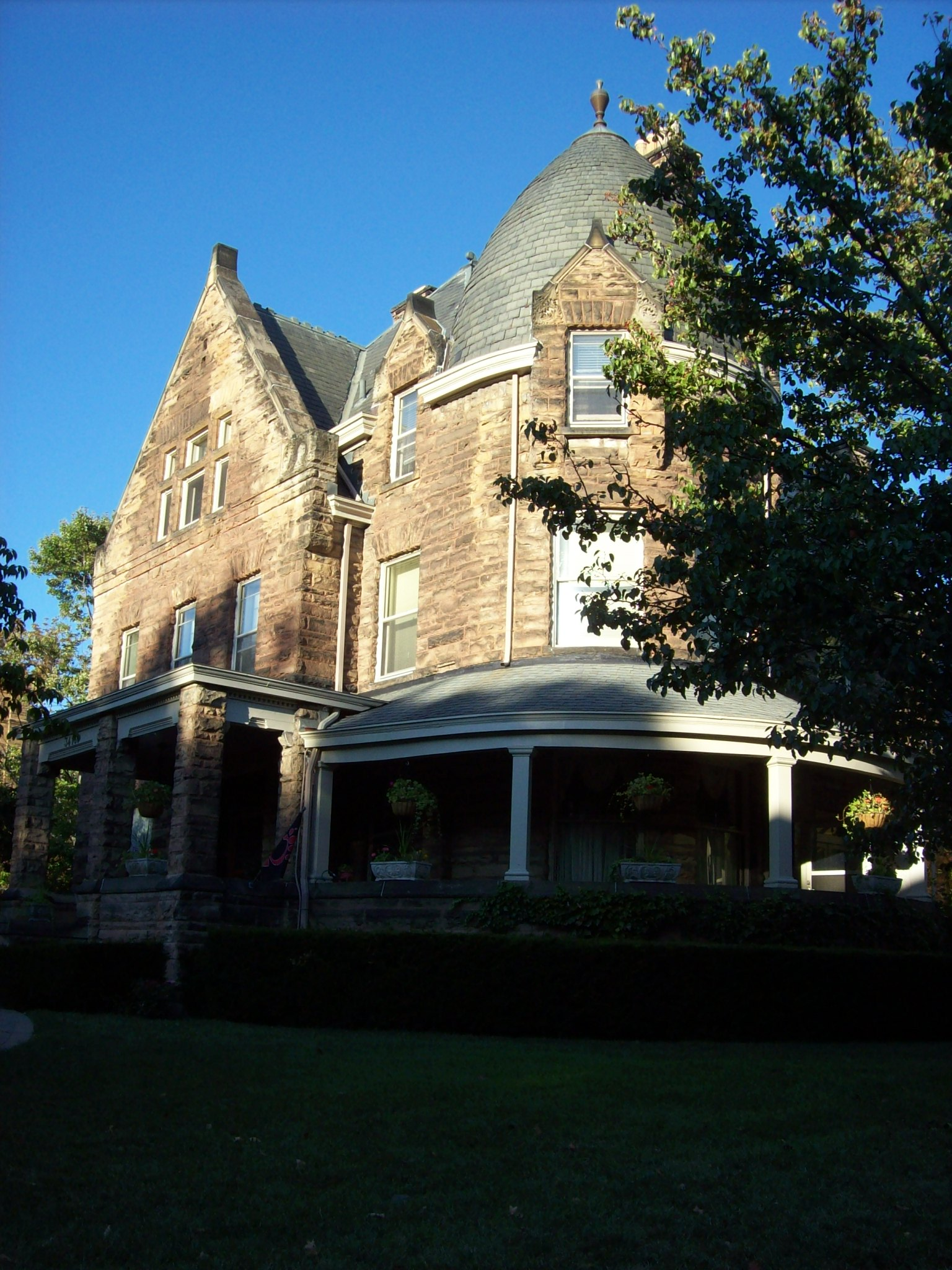
Charles B. Russell House in Gaslight District

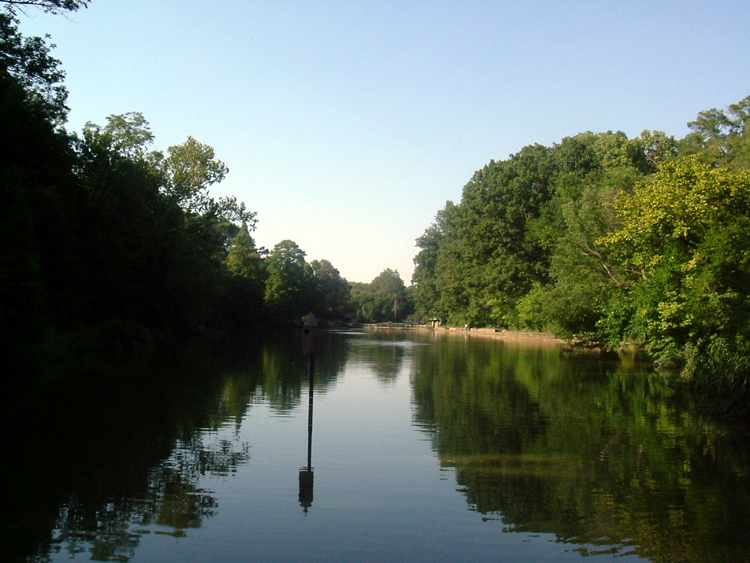
Burnet Woods

Unofficial flag
