= Hulda Regina Graser =

American custom house broker (1870–1943)

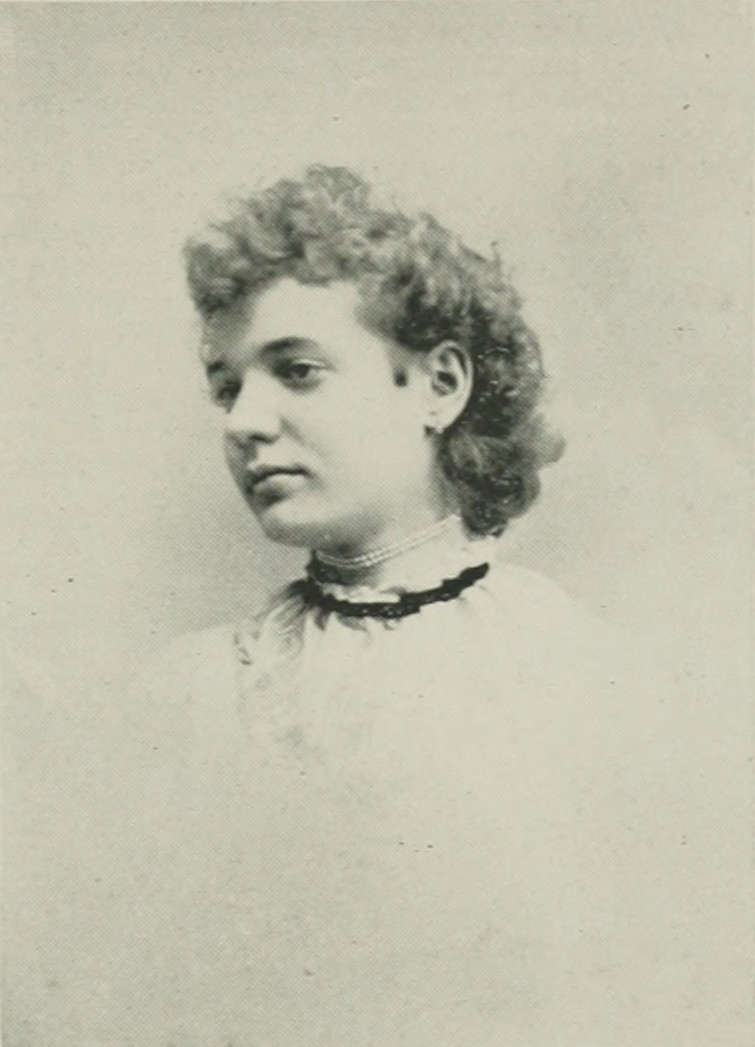
- "A Woman of the Century"
- Born: June 23, 1870; Montreal, Canada
- Died: January 14, 1943 (aged 72); Cincinnati, Ohio, U.S.
- Other name: Hulda Graser Luebbert
- Occupation: customs house broker

Hulda Regina Graser (also known as, H. R. Graser; after marriage, Luebbert; June 23, 1870 – January 14, 1943) was a Canadian-born American customs house broker. In her day, she was the only woman in the world who worked in this occupation. In December 1897, a few months after her wedding, the United States Department of the Treasury, in Custom house broker, femme sole (18653.), determined the style of Graser's professional married signature under Coverture law. Graser counted Eleanor Roosevelt as a friend.

== Early life and education ==
Hulda Regina Graser was born in Montreal, Canada, June 23, 1870. (Note: According to Willard & Livermore (1893) Hulda's date of birth was June 23, 1869.) In 1870, the family removed to Chicago, Illinois, where, in the Great Chicago Fire of 1871, they lost all their property and nearly lost their lives. Her father, Ernst G. Graser, was a native of St. Gallen, Switzerland, where he was born in 1842. He came to the U.S. in 1867 and settled in Montreal. Her mother was a resident of Zürich, Switzerland.

After the loss of their home and property in Chicago, the family went to Cincinnati, Ohio, where they began life anew. Mr. Graser, who was an educated man and could speak several languages well, secured employment with the government. He also gave private instruction in foreign languages. He remained in the custom-house ten years, after which time, in 1882, he opened what a customs brokerage business. One year prior to his death, which occurred in 1884, he took into partnership with him his older daughter, Matilda, styling the firm E. & M. Graser. After his death, Matilda continued the business until her marriage, in 1885, to Dr. Ernst H. Rothe, when she sold it.

Hulda, the younger daughter, was educated in the Cincinnati free schools, and partly by private tutors.

== Career ==
In 1885, she was employed as clerk and then as cashier in a wholesale and retail notion house. She afterward studied stenography, did some reporting and helped on the senatorial investigation, in the above capacity. In the fall of 1886, when seventeen years old, Graser opened a new office as customs broker and forwarder, her sister's successor having sold out to her present competitor. In 1887, about five months after she commenced, there was a decision by the department, on the strength of false representations made to the department, prohibiting brokers or their clerks from getting any information from customs officials without an order from the different importers, thus making her beginning doubly hard. That necessitated her calling upon every importer in the city, securing his signature to a petition asking for any and all information regarding each firm's importations.

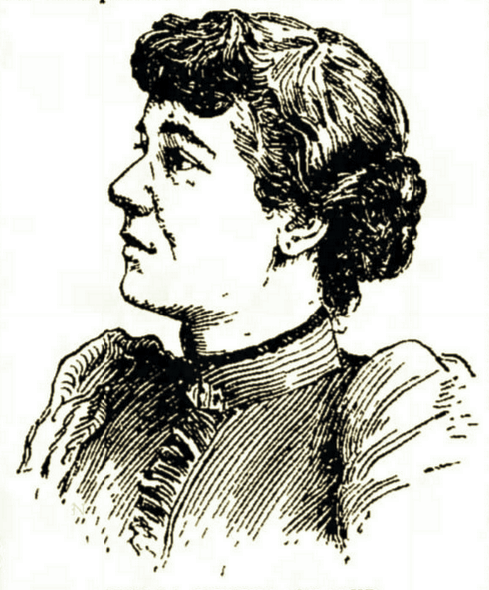
1892

She made the acquaintance of her father's old patrons, and sought new ones for her own. She thereafter controlled an extensive and profitable business, attending to all the importing of several of the largest of the firms of Cincinnati, as well as some of the largest brokerage concerns of the Eastern cities.

The goods were consigned direct to her, she figured up the duty, paid the same, and delivered the goods to the proper parties. She knew the different ratings; she figured the duty on every type of goods from every country. The bills were made out in the particular currancy of the country from which the goods came, reducing that to U.S. currency. She kept herself posted in all tariff laws and regulations, and followed the legislation of Congress in regard to all changes in the customs and tariff laws.

In 1890, in connection with brokerage, she took up an agency for tinplates, and she handled large quantities of that article. The greater amount of tinplates arriving at Cincinnati between January and July, 1891, went through her office, and her undertaking proved very successful. In May 1897, she purchased a farm of 160 acres (65 ha) near Custerville, Nebraska in order to raise beets and start a beet industry.

On July 10, 1897, in Cincinnati, she married Louis R. Luebbert, an attorney. Graser continued working after marriage whether or not it was legal for her to continue to transact business under her maiden name was questioned. The United States District Attorney's office opined that Graser could continue to use her maiden name. Then the opinion of a U.S. judge was secured; he said that a married woman's legal name is that which her husband bears and that as long as they are married, she can have no other surname, excepting for business purposes, when she can assume her maiden name or any other name, provided, of course, that there is no intent to defraud. On December 7, 1897, W. B. Howell, Assistant Secretary of the U.S. Treasury Department ruled on the usage of Graser's professional signature after marriage as follows:—

"Replying to your letter of the 20th ultimo, requesting to be advised whether a certain Mrs. ––––– formerly Miss H. R. Graser, doing business as a customs broker at your port, and holding powers of attorney for many firms to transact such business, having married, can continue to transact business under her maiden name, under the same powers of attorney held by her before marriage, I have to inform you. that the Solicitor of the Treasury, to whom this matter was referred, advises this Department, under date of the 2d instant, that in his opinion Miss H. R. Graser may continue to represent her constituents in the transaction of customs business as a femme sole, but that as a further means of identification and for the sake of consistency, she should be required to add to her signature the words: 'Now Mrs. –––––,' etc., stating her proper designation as a femme consort."

Graser was appointed sub-Chair of the Clifton District for the Woman's Division of the Hamilton County Myers Y. Cooper-for-Governor Club in 1926. She founded at least two organizations in Cincinnati's Clifton district: the Junion Clifton Music Club and the Mother's Club of Clifton School. She served as president of the Monday Lecture Club, and was affiliated with the Matinee Musicale Club and the Motion Picture Council.

== Personal life ==
In religion, she was a member of Cincinnati's Calvary Episcopal Church.

Hulda Regina Graser Luebbert died in Cincinnati, January 14, 1943.
