= Bellevue Hill Park =

Municipal park in Cincinnati, Ohio

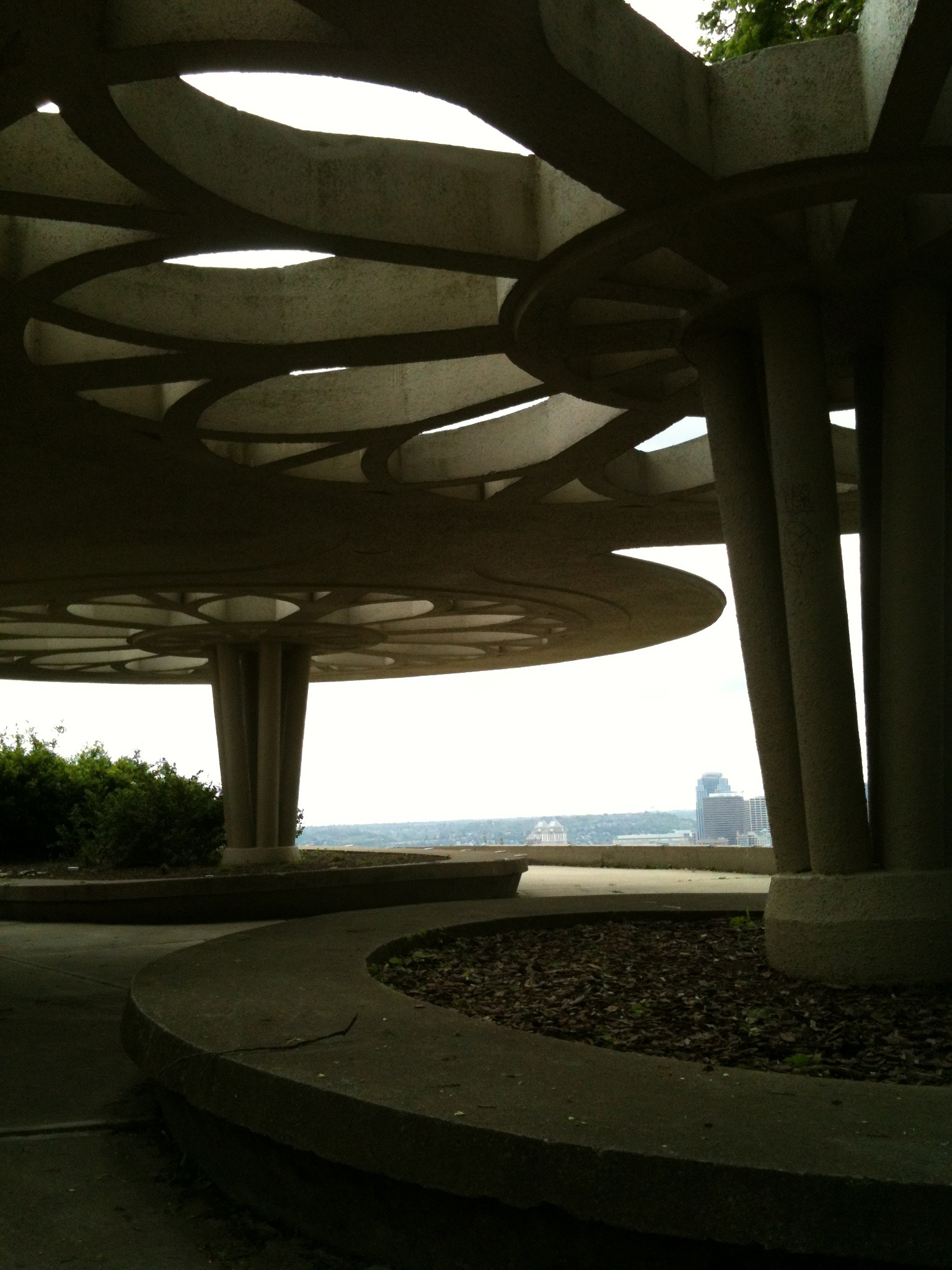
- Interactive map of Bellevue Hill Park
- Type: Urban park
- Location: Clifton Heights in Cincinnati, Ohio
- Coordinates: 39°07′16″N 84°31′11″W
- Area: 15 acres (6.1 ha)
- Created: 1955
- Operator: Cincinnati Park Board
- Status: Open all year

Bellevue Hill Park, owned and operated by the Cincinnati Park Board, is a city park in the neighborhood of Clifton Heights in Cincinnati, Ohio on Ohio Avenue. The park consists of 15 acres (6.1 ha), part of which is leased to the city by the University of Cincinnati. The park has a baseball field, shelter, picnic areas, playgrounds and restrooms. The park can be seen in the video It's Not My Time by 3 Doors Down when they are standing on the spiderweb stage high above Downtown Cincinnati.

== Pavilion ==
An example of organic architecture, the park's pavilion was designed by architect R. Carl Freund in 1955 to serve as an outdoor dancing venue. It features a cantilever roof, bandstand and three pergolas that form the pavilion's signature concrete canopy. Located on the former site of the Bellevue House and incline, part of Cincinnati's historic streetcar system, the pavilion leads to the Daniel J. Ransohoff Overlook of Cincinnati.
