= Sacred Heart Academy (Cincinnati, Ohio) =

- U.S. National Register of Historic Places
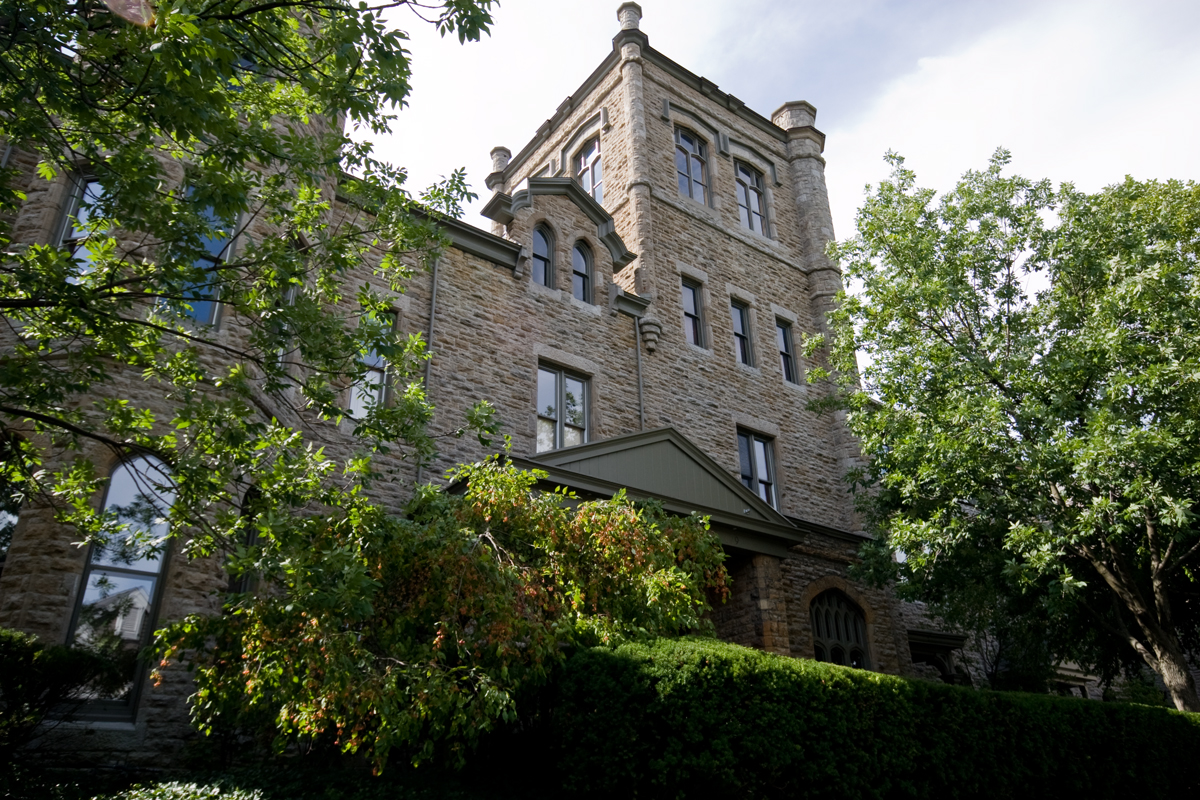
- Tower at the academy

- Location within Ohio Location within the United States
- Location: 525 Lafayette St., Cincinnati, Ohio
- Coordinates: 39°9′11″N 84°31′38″W
- Area: 3 acres (1.2 ha)
- Built: 1868
- Architect: Samuel Hannaford
- Architectural style: English medieval castle
- MPS: Samuel Hannaford and Sons TR in Hamilton County
- NRHP reference No.: 73001467
- Added to NRHP: April 11, 1973

Sacred Heart Academy is a historic former residence and school in the city of Cincinnati, Ohio, United States. Built as the home of a wealthy man, it was the location of a Catholic school for most of its history. As a work of a regionally prominent architect, it has been named a historic site.

== History ==
English immigrant Samuel Hannaford began his Cincinnati architectural practice in 1858 in partnership with Edwin Anderson. This partnership endured until 1870, shortly after Sacred Heart Academy was constructed in 1868. The building was originally a massive house; its first resident, William C. Neff, desired that his home be patterned after the English Kenilworth Castle. Neff's house was one of numerous residences that Hannaford designed for Cincinnati's wealthy, although it predates most others; Hannaford became prominent in Cincinnati and the surrounding region only after designing Music Hall near downtown in 1877, and the Gilded Age at the end of the nineteenth century saw numerous Hannaford houses being constructed in prestigious neighborhoods such as Walnut Hills and Avondale. Neff only lived in his great house for a few years; in 1876, it was acquired by the Academy of the Sacred Heart, which needed to leave its previous location on Grandin Road. The Academy used the property for nearly a century until closing entirely in 1970, but it had remained active among Catholic schools until shortly before the end; in the late 1960s, it became a founding member of the Girls Greater Cincinnati League. During its decades in the building, the school arranged for the construction of multiple additions to the original structure.

== Architecture ==
Built primarily of stone, the Academy features ashlar walls with a rough appearance. Most parts of the building are two or three stories tall, although the intended English castle appearance is responsible for the presence of a four-story tower. Visitors enter through a portico dominated by pointed arches: both the main entrance and the sidelights employ the design, as does a window placed under the main part of the tower. Such windows, emblematic of the Gothic Revival style, were also used for later construction; they form a crucial component of an attached chapel built during the school's occupation of the building. Inside, hand-carven wood panelling is exceptionally extensive: the Swiss woodworkers whom Neff hired for the purpose required two full years of work to complete the carvings.

== Historic site ==
In 1973, the academy was listed on the National Register of Historic Places, qualifying because of its historically significant architecture. Seven years later, it was included in a multiple property submission of fifty-five Hannaford-designed buildings in Hamilton County; its previous National Register status, along with that of sixteen others in the submission, was a significant component of the rationale for granting National Register status to the remaining thirty-eight buildings.

The original landscaping was by Adolph Strauch.
