= CUF, Cincinnati =

Neighborhood of Cincinnati, Ohio, United States

CUF Clifton Heights, University Heights, Fairview
- Neighborhood
- Flag

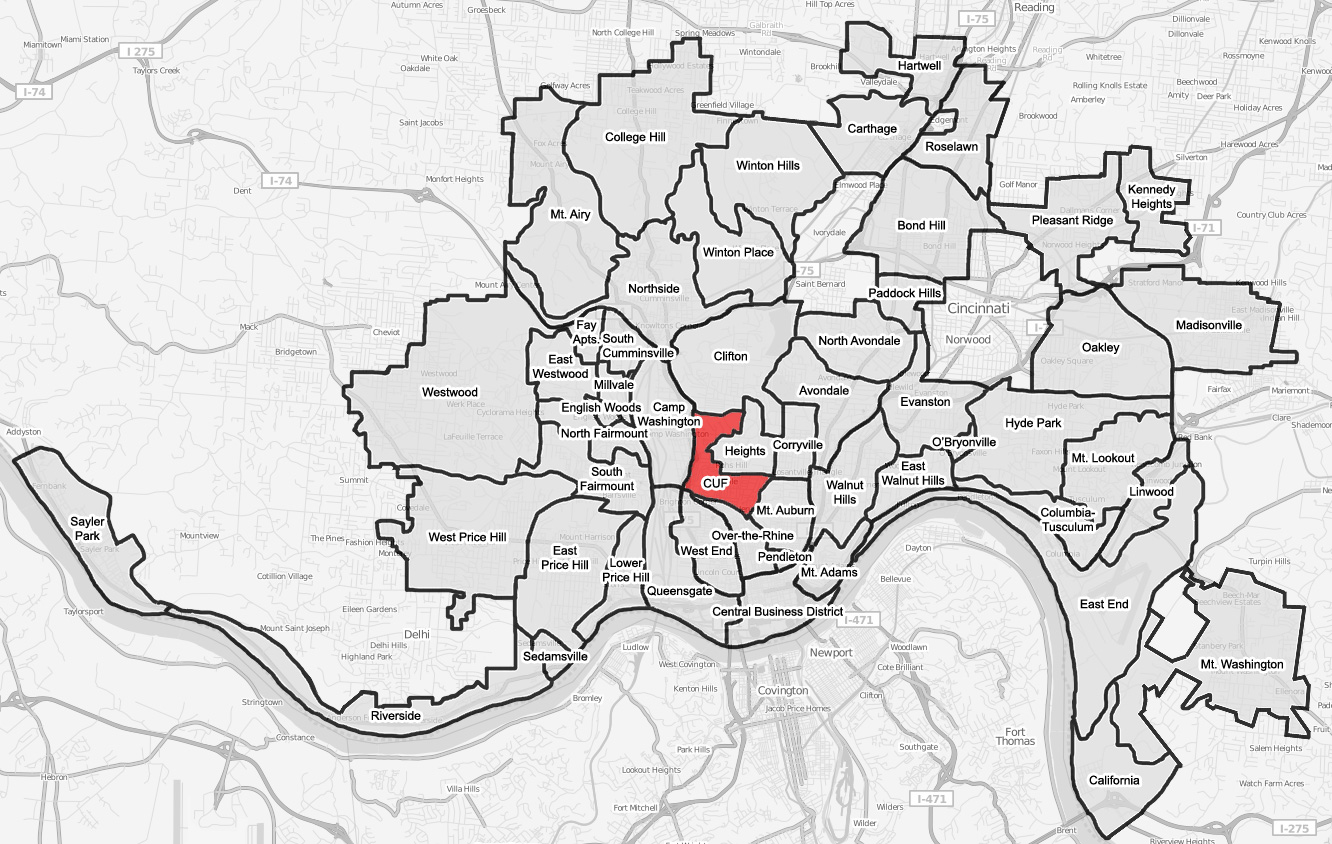
- CUF (red) within Cincinnati
- Coordinates: 39°8′0″N 84°31′30″W
- Country: United States
- State: Ohio
- County: Hamilton
- City: Cincinnati

Population (2020)
  - Total: 20,385
- Time zone: UTC-5 (EST)
  - Summer (DST): UTC-4 (EDT)
- ZIP codes: 45219, 45220
- Area code: 513

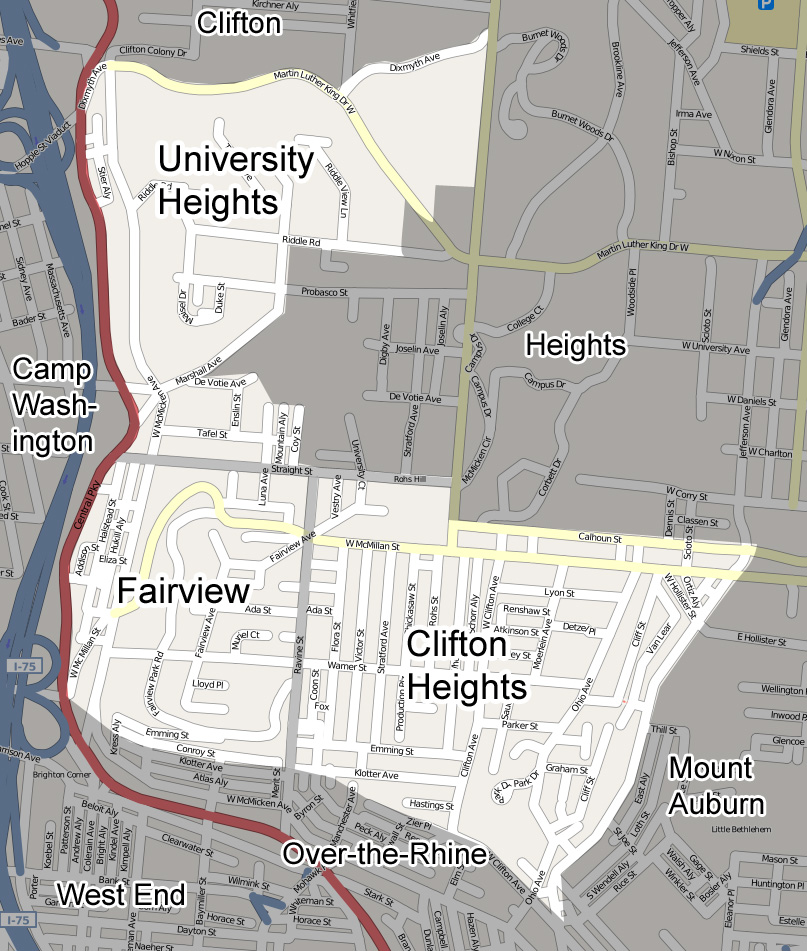
A street map of CUF.

CUF is one of the 52 neighborhoods of Cincinnati, Ohio, United States. Its name is derived from the communities of Clifton Heights, University Heights, and Fairview. These communities surround the University of Cincinnati to the south and west of its main campus, making CUF a predominantly residential, student neighborhood. The population was 20,385 at the 2020 census.

== Geography ==
CUF is bordered by the neighborhoods of Clifton, Mount Auburn, Over-the-Rhine, and Camp Washington, and by the main campus of the University of Cincinnati.

University Heights occupies the northern area of CUF, and is separated from Fairview and Clifton Heights by Straight Street. Fairview occupies the south-west corner and Clifton Heights the south-east corner of CUF. Fairview and Clifton Heights are separated by Ravine Street; Fairview on the west, Clifton Heights on the east.

The term "CUF" is rarely, if ever, used by locals. Although inaccurate, these neighborhoods, along with nearby Corryville, are often referred to as being part of Clifton, even by long-term residents.

== Demographics ==
Population of 1900-2020
Year	Pop.	±%
1900	20,344	—
1910	23,765	+16.8%
1920	26,775	+12.7%
1930	27,637	+3.2%
1940	26,275	−4.9%
1950	27,995	+6.5%
1960	26,604	−5.0%
1970	23,336	−12.3%
1980	18,466	−20.9%
1990	17,532	−5.1%
2000	16,119	−8.1%
2010	16,989	+5.4%
2020	20,385	+20.0%

As of the census of 2020, there were 20,385 people living in the neighborhood. There were 7,517 housing units. The racial makeup of the neighborhood was 68.7% White, 15.6% Black or African American, 0.1% Native American, 8.6% Asian, 0.0% Pacific Islander, 1.9% from some other race, and 5.0% from two or more races. 3.6% of the population were Hispanic or Latino of any race.

There were 5,439 households, out of which 18.2% were families. 39.7% of all households were made up of individuals.

2.5% of the neighborhood's population were under the age of 18, 94.9% were 18 to 64, and 2.6% were 65 years of age or older. 45.7% of the population were male and 54.3% were female.

According to the U.S. Census American Community Survey, for the period 2016-2020 the estimated median annual income for a household in the neighborhood was $33,511. About 20.5% of family households were living below the poverty line. About 56.1% had a bachelor's degree or higher.

== Parks ==
Fairview Park, a 27.7-acre (112,000 m^{2}) park, and Bellevue Hill, a 15-acre (61,000 m^{2}) park, are located in the neighborhood. Both are known for their views overlooking Downtown Cincinnati.

== Education ==
Clifton Heights is home to Hughes STEM High School, a magnet high school. Its current Clifton Heights location was built in 1906.

University Heights is home to the main campus of Hebrew Union College – Jewish Institute of Religion, a Reform Jewish seminary.

Fairview is the former home of Fairview German Language School, which was founded by the neighborhood's German community in 1888. In 2008, the school was relocated to Clifton.
