= Albert C. Nash =

American architect (1825 - 1890)

Albert Cone Nash
- Born: December 10, 1825; New York City, United States
- Died: June 15, 1890 (aged 64); Cincinnati
- Occupation: Architect

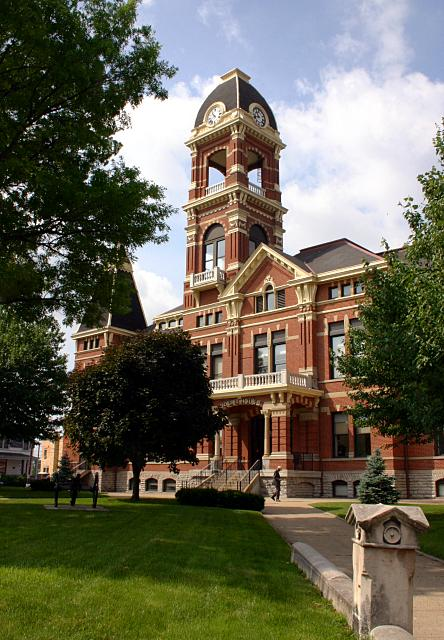
The Campbell County Courthouse in Newport, Kentucky, completed in 1884.

Albert C. Nash (1825-1890) was an American architect best known for his work in Milwaukee and Cincinnati.

== Life and career ==
Albert Cone Nash was born December 10, 1825, in New York City to Burr Nash and Mary (Oatman) Nash. In 1832 the family moved to New Haven, Connecticut, where Nash was educated and was trained in architecture. The leading architects in New Haven at the time were Henry Austin and Sidney Mason Stone, but it is not documented if he worked for either. In 1848 he established himself as an architect in Bridgeport, where he practiced for eight years. In 1856 he moved west to Milwaukee. In 1867, having been awarded the commission to design the new Cincinnati Hospital, he relocated to Cincinnati. He continued to live and work in Cincinnati until his death in 1890.

The notable Connecticut architects Rufus W. Bunnell, Robert W. Hill and Edward R. Lambert all received training in Nash's office, and he was a mentor to many young Cincinnati architects.

Nash was a founding member of the Cincinnati chapter of the American Institute of Architects in 1870. He served twice as the group's president, from 1873 to 1877 and 1882 to 1885.

== Personal life ==
Nash married in 1851 to Henrietta B. Tucker of New Haven. He had at least one son, M. R. Nash, who was also an architect and succeeded to his father's practice after his death. The younger Nash was born in Milwaukee, and began working for his father in 1879. After two years of private practice Nash formed a partnership with Lucien F. Plympton circa 1892. Nash & Plympton practiced together until at least 1895.

Albert C. Nash died July 15, 1890, at home in Walnut Hills.

== Projects ==
- Trinity Episcopal Church, Southport, Connecticut (1854–56, destroyed and rebuilt 1862)
- Greenfield Hill Congregational Church, Fairfield, Connecticut (1855, altered)
- House for James H. Rogers, (Note: This was the most expensive house in Milwaukee at the time of construction. Later owned and altered by John Plankinton.) Milwaukee, Wisconsin (1856–57, demolished)
- Bank of Milwaukee Building, (Note: Annexed in 1903 to the neighboring building of the Milwaukee National Bank to designs by Ferry & Clas. The building is the only known building by Nash remaining in Milwaukee.) Milwaukee, Wisconsin (1858–59, altered 1903, NRHP 1984)
- Additions to the Wisconsin School for the Deaf, Delavan, Wisconsin (1866–67, demolished)
- "Holmesdale" for Daniel Henry Holmes, (Note: The house became the Holmes High School in 1919, and was demolished for an extension to the school in 1936.) Covington, Kentucky (1866–67, demolished 1936)
- Cincinnati Hospital, Cincinnati, Ohio (1867–69, demolished)
- House for Elias Howe Jr., (Note: This house was to be built on the site of P. T. Barnum's Iranistan, but Howe died before plans were completed.) Bridgeport, Connecticut (circa 1867, not built)
- House for Anthony H. Hinkle, Mount Auburn, Cincinnati, Ohio (1868, demolished)
- Mound Street Temple, (Note: Located in the West End, which was mostly demolished in the 1950s. The building has also been attributed to Samuel Hannaford.) Cincinnati, Ohio (1868–69, demolished)
- Central Christian Church, Cincinnati, Ohio (1869–72, demolished)
- Bourbon County Courthouse, Paris, Kentucky (1873–74, burned 1901)
- First Presbyterian Church, (Note: A contributing property to the Glendale Historic District, listed on the National Register of Historic Places in 1976.) Glendale, Ohio (1873)
- Trinity Episcopal Church, Parkersburg, West Virginia (1878–79, NRHP 1982)
- Parish hall of Grace Church (former), (Note: The main church was built in 1869 and designed by James W. McLaughlin.) Cincinnati, Ohio (1880, NRHP 1982)
- Dueber Watch Case Manufacturing Company factories, (Note: The later and larger of these two buildings has been demolished.) Newport, Kentucky (1882–83 and 1886)
- St. Clair Hotel, Cincinnati, Ohio (1882, demolished)
- Wyoming Baptist Church, (Note: A contributing property to the Village Historic District, listed on the National Register of Historic Places in 1986.) Wyoming, Ohio (1882)
- Campbell County Courthouse, (Note: A contributing property to the Newport Courthouse Square Historic District, listed on the National Register of Historic Places in 2010.) Newport, Kentucky (1883–84, NRHP 1988)
- Latonia Race Track, Covington, Kentucky (1883, demolished)
- Sisters of Charity of Cincinnati motherhouse, Mount Saint Joseph, Ohio (1883)
- Masonic Building, (Note: A contributing property to the Central Ludlow Historic District, listed on the National Register of Historic Places in 1984.) Ludlow, Kentucky (1884)
- R. C. Church of the Assumption (former), Cincinnati, Ohio (1884–85)
- Walnut Hills Christian Church, Cincinnati, Ohio (1884, demolished)
- Hoffner Building, (Note: A contributing property to the Hoffner Historic District, listed on the National Register of Historic Places in 1978.) Cincinnati, Ohio (1885)
- Walnut Hills Baptist Church, Cincinnati, Ohio (1885, demolished)
- Fort Washington Hotel, Cincinnati, Ohio (1887)
- Westminster Presbyterian Church, Cincinnati, Ohio (1888, demolished)
- St. Nicholas Hotel annex, Cincinnati, Ohio (1890, demolished)
- Carlisle Building, Cincinnati, Ohio (no date, demolished)

== Gallery of architectural works ==
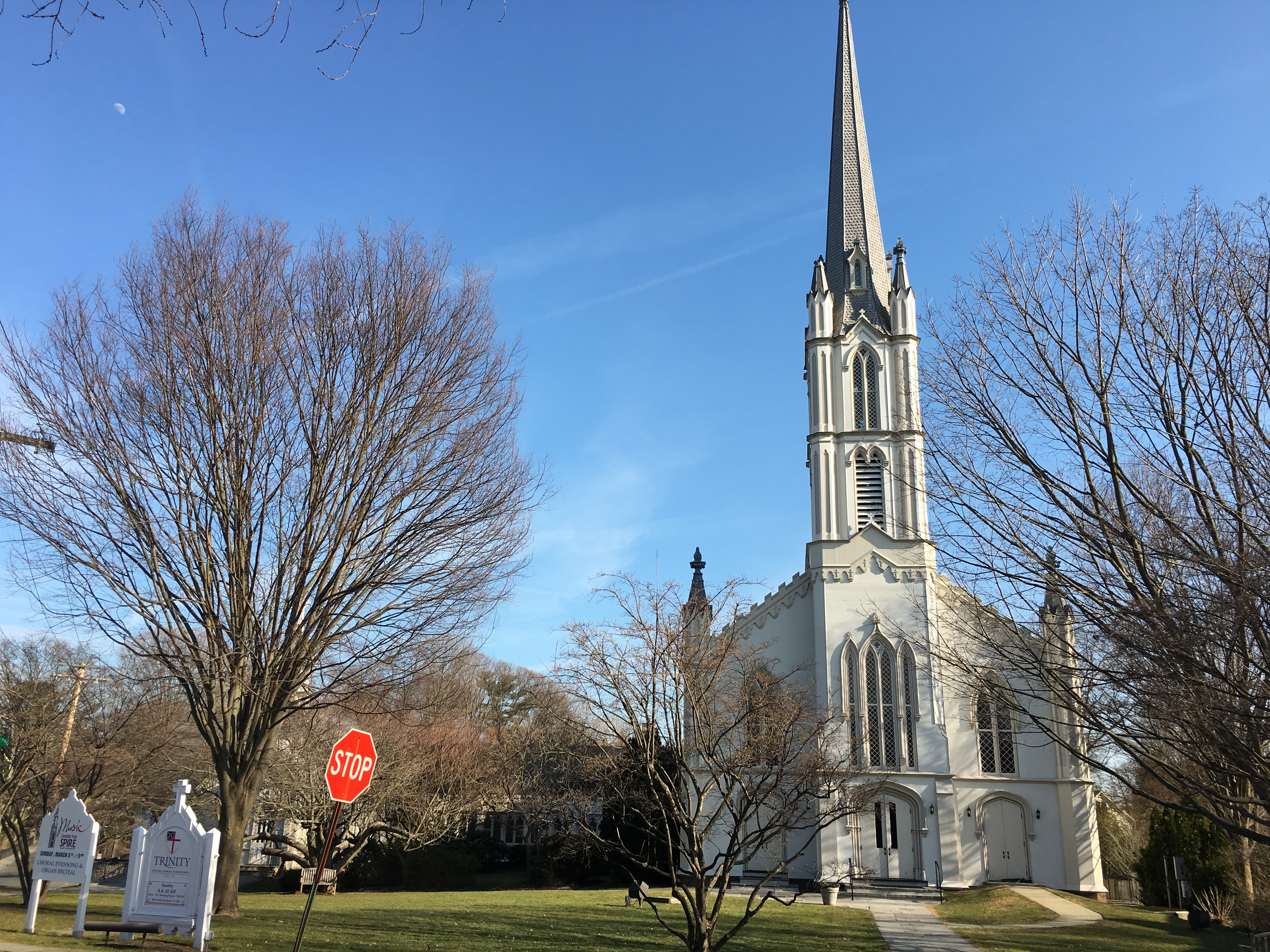
Trinity Episcopal Church, Southport, Connecticut, 1854-56.

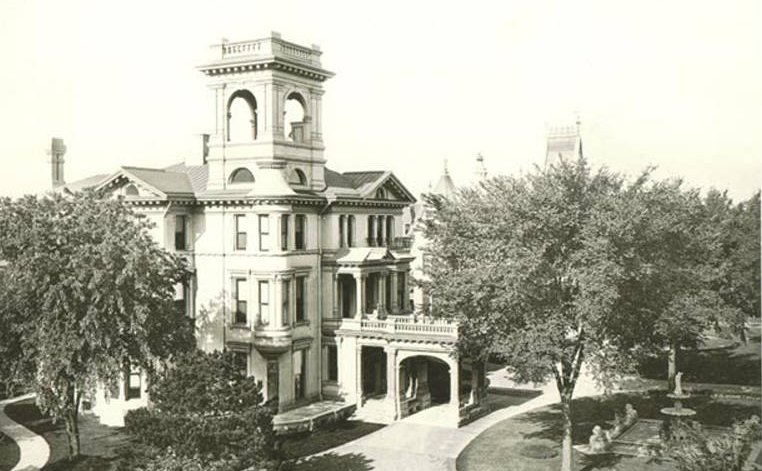
House for James H. Rogers, Milwaukee, Wisconsin, 1856-57.

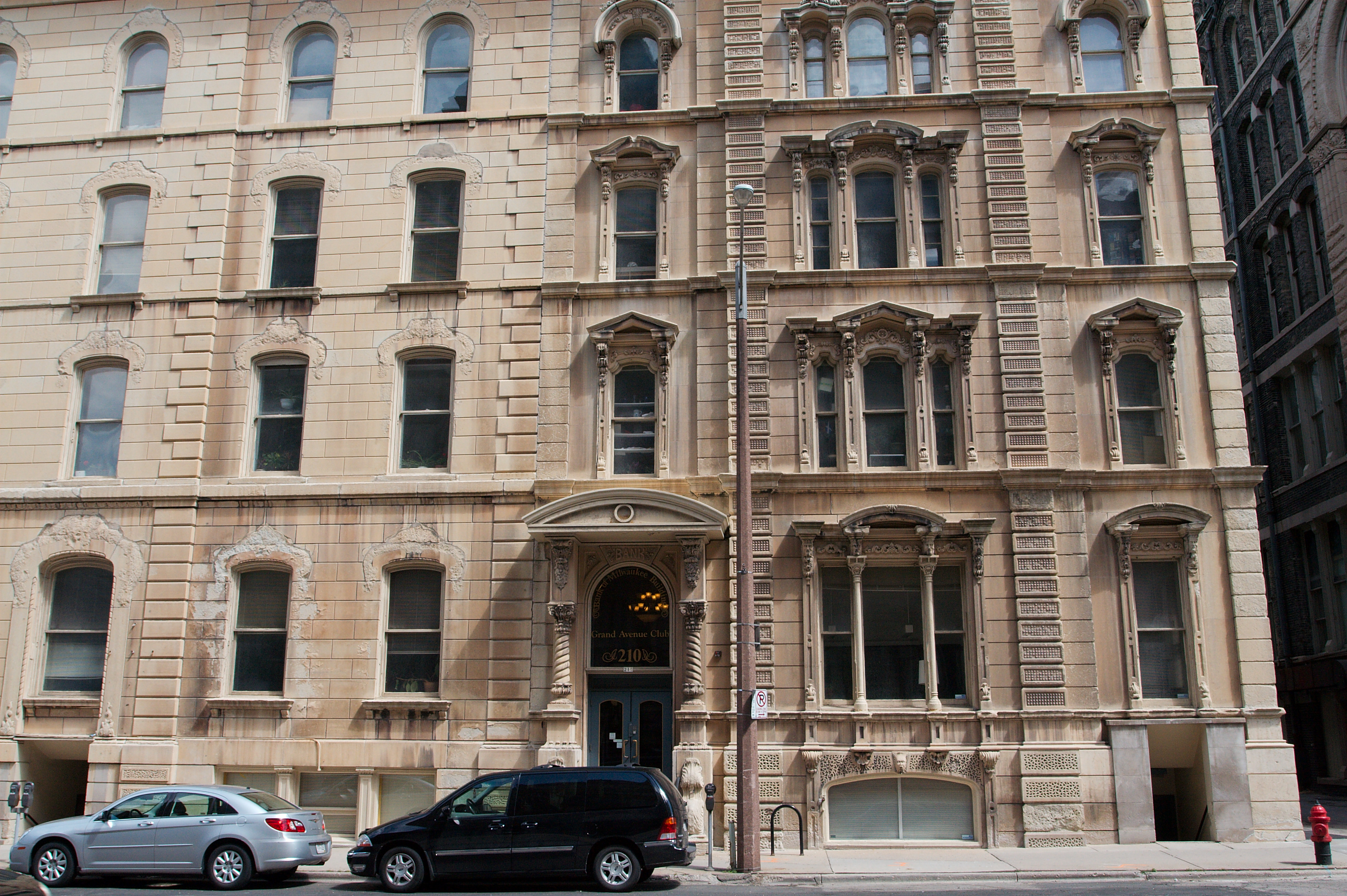
Bank of Milwaukee Building, Milwaukee, Wisconsin, 1858-59.

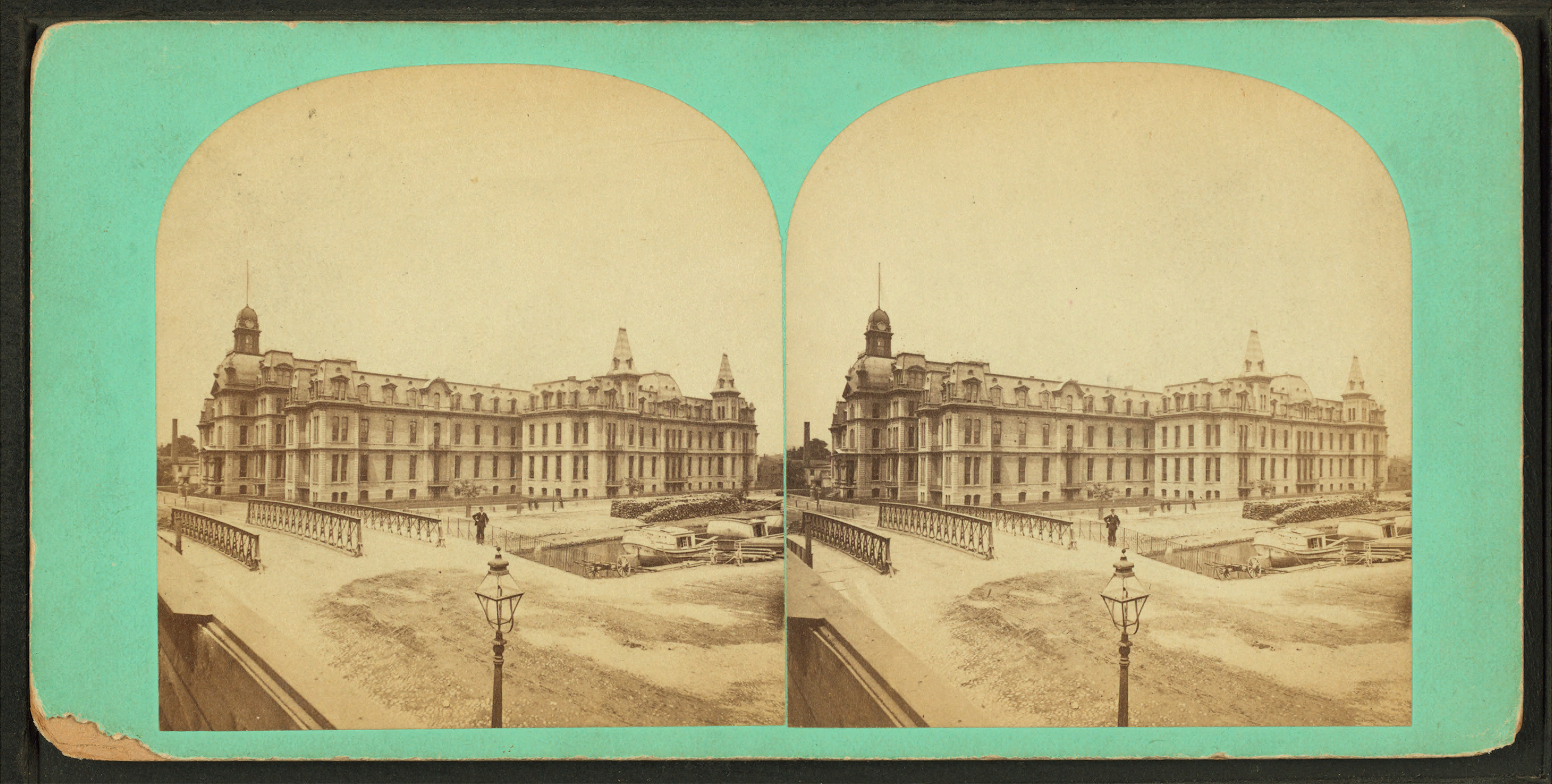
Cincinnati Hospital, Cincinnati, Ohio, 1868-69.

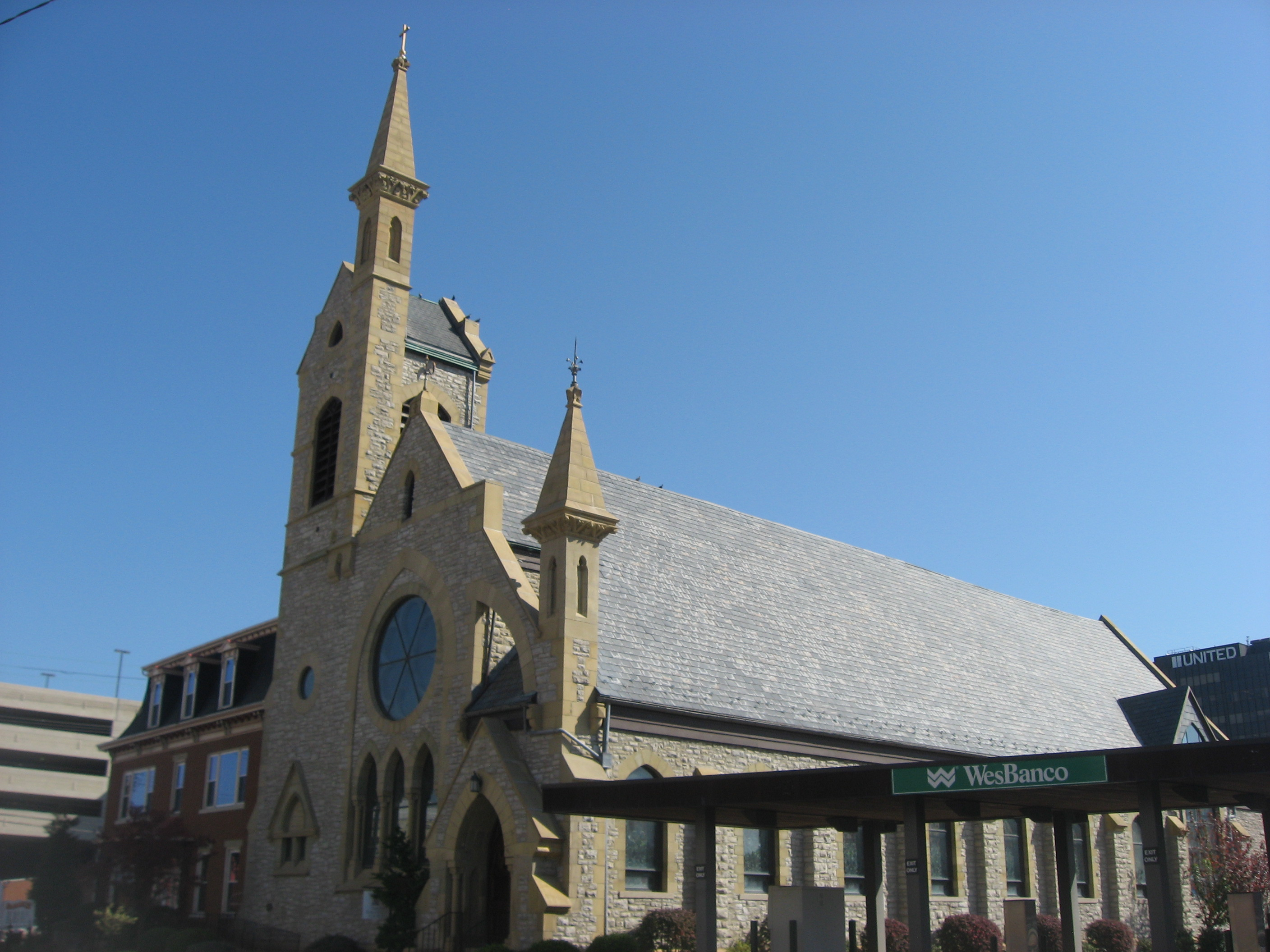
Trinity Episcopal Church, Parkersburg, West Virginia, 1878-79.

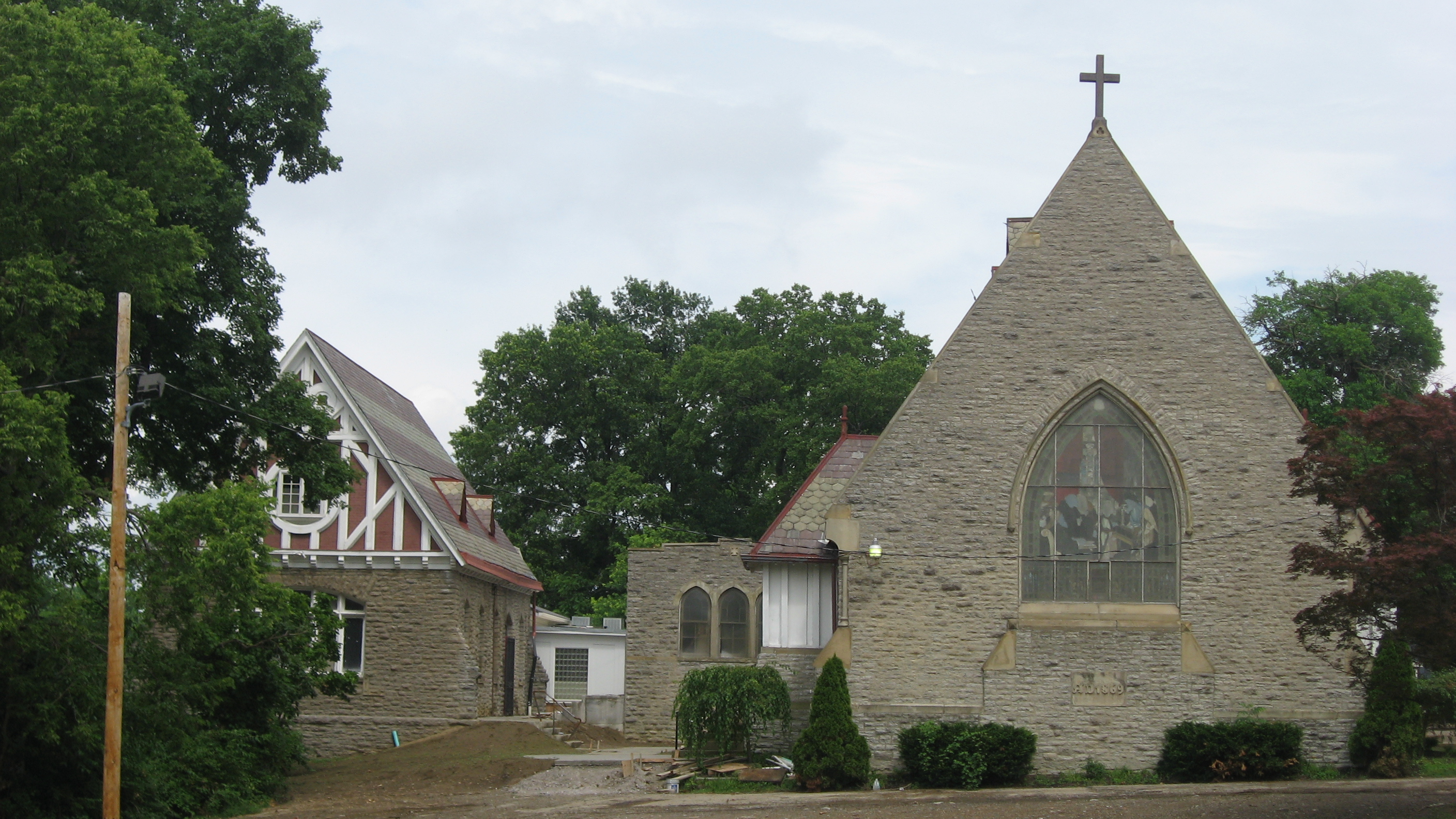
Parish hall (left) of Grace Church, Cincinnati, Ohio, 1880.

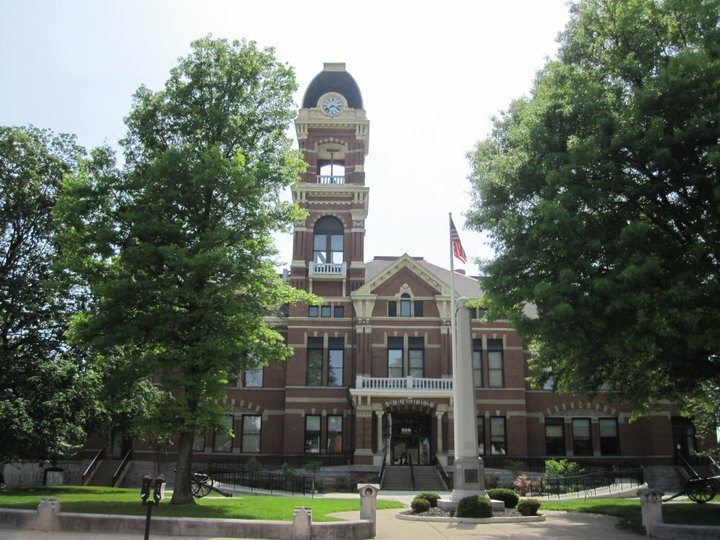
Campbell County Courthouse, Newport, Kentucky, 1883-84.

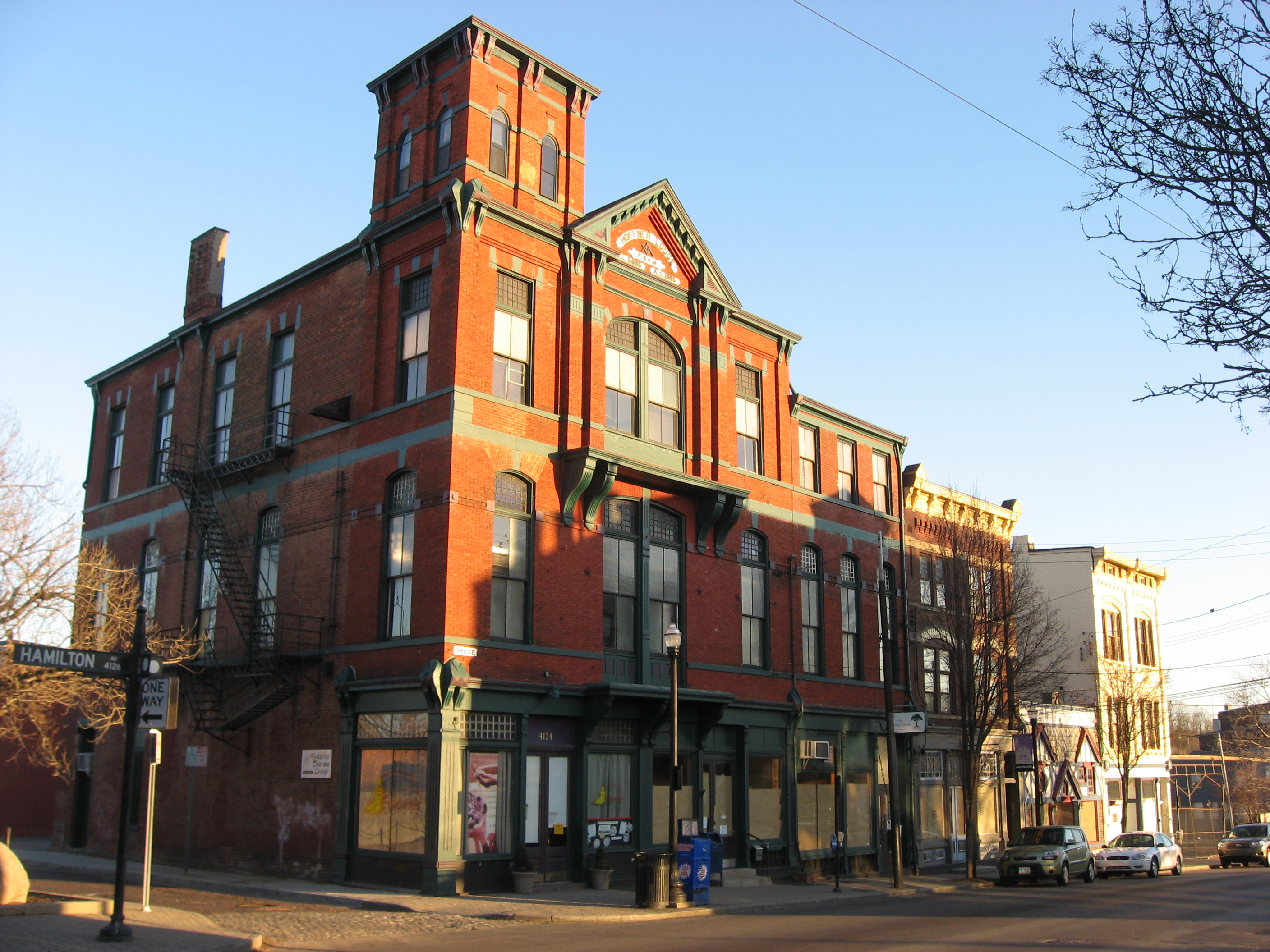
Hoffner Building, Cincinnati, Ohio, 1885.

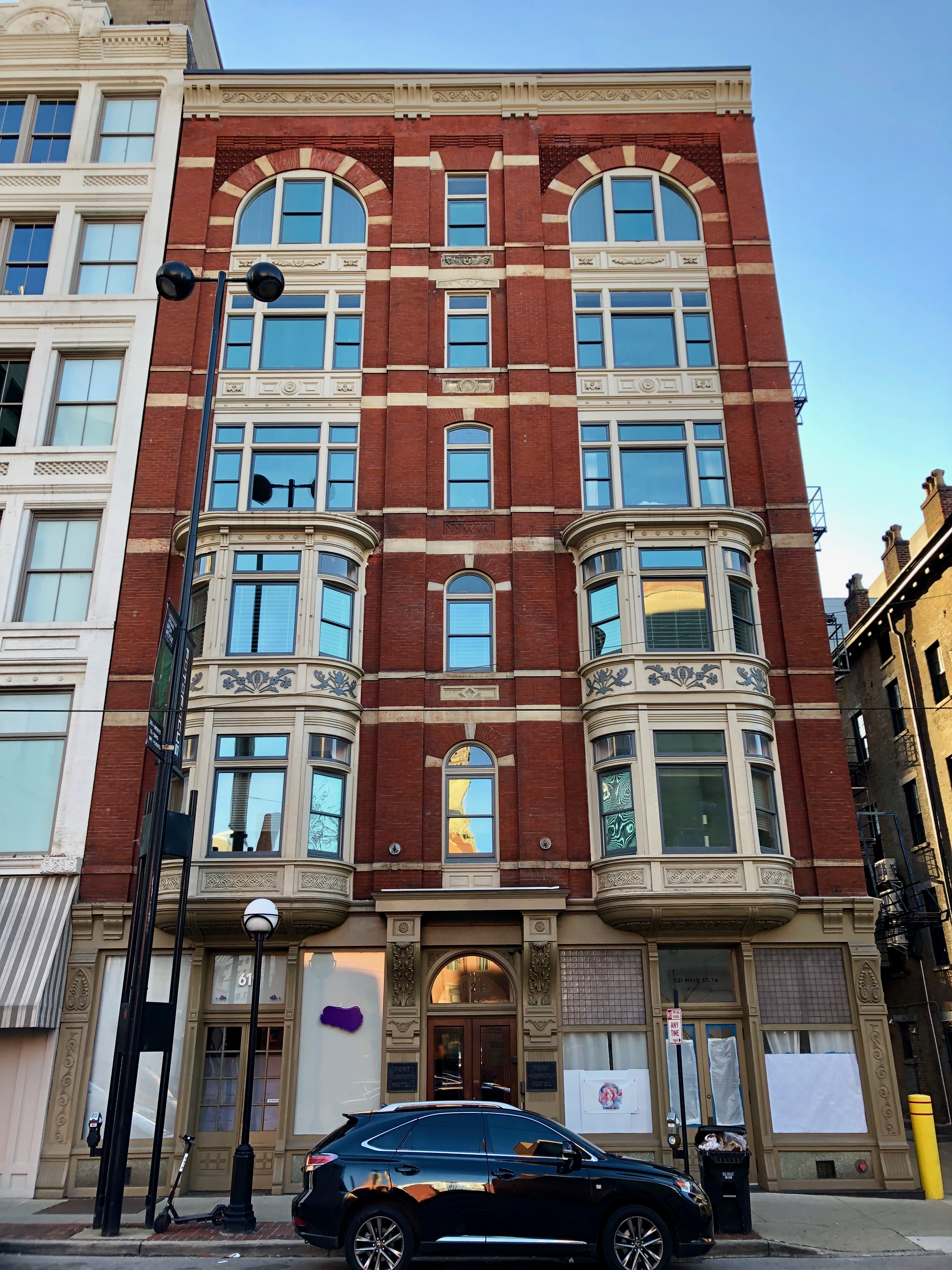
Fort Washington Hotel, Cincinnati, Ohio, 1887.
