= Cincinnati Pride =

Festival and celebration in Cincinnati, Ohio

- Formation: 1973
- Type: 501(c)(3) nonprofit
- Purpose: LGBTQ+ support
- Headquarters: Cincinnati, Ohio, U.S.
- Region served: Greater Cincinnati
- Members: 280,000 attendees (2025)
- Website: www.cincinnatipride.org

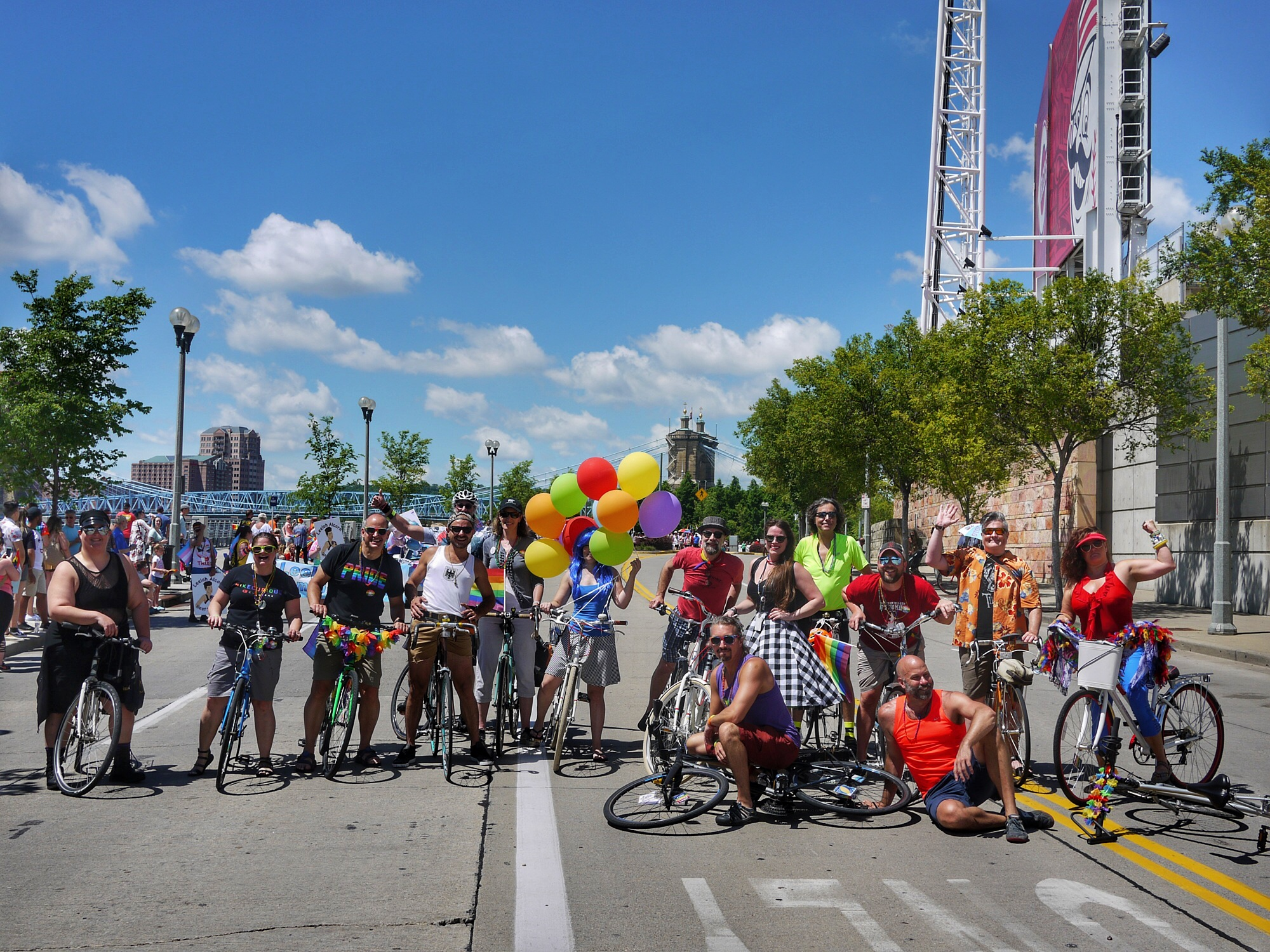
Participants in the 2017 parade

Cincinnati Pride is an annual LGBTQ+ celebration in Cincinnati, Ohio, featuring a downtown parade and a festival at Sawyer Point & Yeatman’s Cove on the banks of the Ohio River. The event occurs on the last Saturday in June. First held in 1973, Cincinnati Pride has grown into one of the Midwest’s largest Pride events, drawing an estimated 280,000 attendees in 2025. It is organized by Cincinnati Pride, Inc., a nonprofit established in 2013, to provide the Greater Cincinnati LGBTQ+ community and allies a forum to promote inclusion and acceptance.

Cincinnati Pride has a rich history. After periods of sporadic parades and a late-1990s hiatus, the event was relaunched in 2000 in Northside and moved downtown in 2010 to accommodate its growth.

In addition to the annual parade and festival, Cincinnati Pride hosts year-round community events such as fundraisers, drag shows, and outreach programs that support LGBTQ+ visibility and local nonprofits.

== History ==
In 1972, Cincinnati’s first gay organization, The Cincinnati Gay Community (CGC), was established by Michael Weyand, Terry Flanagan, Carol Kipp, Richard (Dick) Jazwinski, Ronald Carter, Jack Ferguson, and Karl Owens.

In April 1973, four years after the initial events surrounding the Stonewall riots, CGC organizers planned and carried out Cincinnati’s first gay march through Over the Rhine (OTR) and rally at Fountain Square. Although some of the original details are unclear, most reports state that initial attendance ranged from 12–40 individuals.

Shortly after the 1973 rally and march, the CGC disbanded and the next city-wide Pride was not revived until 1978 when it fell under the auspices of the newly created Greater Cincinnati Gay Coalition. The GCGC became the Greater Cincinnati Gay and Lesbian Coalition in 1984. Subsequently, the GCGLC became the Gay and Lesbian Community Center of Greater Cincinnati (The Center) in 1993.

In 1993 when Cincinnati passed the notoriously anti-gay Issue 3 (Article 12). Because of the city’s new ordinances, LGBT activism dropped sharply and a city-wide Pride event no longer seemed feasible. As a result, smaller events popped up in more liberal neighborhoods across the metropolitan area including festivals in Lunken Playfield in Mt. Washington from 1996–1999. In 1999, Michael Blankenship, a local activist, held a small rally at City Hall.

From 2000–2009, Northside (Cincinnati’s first "Gayborhood"), began holding a parade, rallies at Burnet Woods, and a festival at Hoffner Park as an independent committee chaired by Chris Good and then Ken Colegrove all advised by Michael "Goose" Chanak. In 2004, The Gay & Lesbian Community Center of Greater Cincinnati carried out the two-day festival until 2010 when, in an effort to make the event more accessible to the Greater Tri-state area, organizers moved the parade to downtown Cincinnati and the festival to Fountain Square under the stewardship of the Greater Cincinnati Gay Chamber of Commerce.

Although Northside did not host the official Cincinnati Pride Festival after 2009, Northside Pride continued to host its own event, later in the summer the years 2010–2012.

As Pride Parade and Festival attendance surged (an estimated 120,000 now attend annually), the Greater Cincinnati Gay Chamber of Commerce worked with city officials to move the event from Fountain Square to Sawyer Point Park and Yeatman's Cove (on the banks of the Ohio River) in 2012.

Following the 2013 festivities (the 40th anniversary of the city's first Pride event), Cincinnati Pride registered as an independent, non-profit organization becoming Cincinnati Pride, Inc. The 2014 festival marked the first celebration executed entirely under the organization's newly incorporated board of trustees and planning committee.

As a result of the COVID-19 pandemic, Cincinnati Pride was canceled in 2020. Initially, the event was scheduled for June 27, 2020, and then reset for October 3, 2020. Both were canceled due to COVID-19 concerns. The annual fundraiser, Pride Night at Kings Island held generally on the first Friday of September each year was also canceled due to the pandemic. On February 1, 2021, the Cincinnati Pride committee announced that the in-person 2021 Pride Parade and Festival has been canceled due to COVID-19 but other events will be planned, as appropriate.

== Parade ==
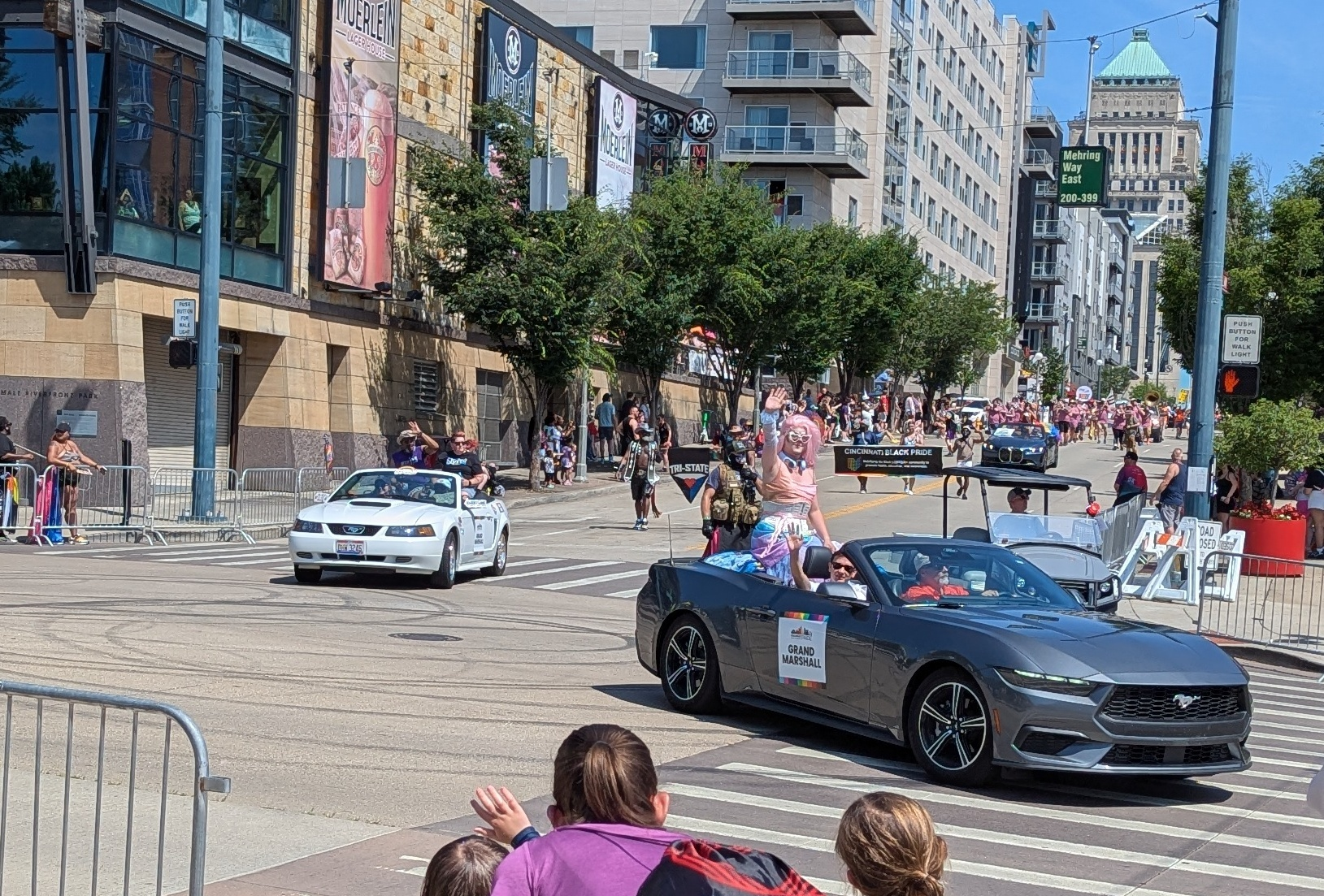
Grand marshals of the 2025 parade

Cincinnati Pride started in 1973. In 2018, the event had approximately 120,000 attendees. The pride parade serves as the anchor event. The event has corporate and non-profit sponsors, including presenting sponsor Delta Air Lines, as well as others including P&G, US Bank, Fifth Third Bank, The Kroger Co., and TriHealth. Various LGBT and affinity groups are involved, too, including Human Rights Campaign, PFLAG, GLSEN, Dykes on Bikes, Imperial Court System, and various BDSM groups. Churches, entertainers and politicians are also involved.

== Festival ==
The festival formed out of a political rally held in Fountain Square in Cincinnati. Today, the festival takes place at Sawyer Point Park and Yeatman's Cove the last weekend in June, the Cincinnati Pride Festival, along with the Pride Parade, commemorates the 1969 Stonewall riots in New York City. Previously, after the first Pride in April 1973, the event was held the second Sunday in June.

In addition to the parade and festival, the event's organizers have expanded the celebration to include numerous fundraisers, gay-themed city bike rides, movie screenings, fashion shows featuring the work of local designers, brunches, and local events at the Cincinnati Art Museum.

== Administration ==
After the 40th anniversary of the festival, in 2013, Cincinnati Pride incorporated as a non-profit organization in the State of Ohio and was granted its tax exempt status as a public charity in November, 2015 by the IRS. It is governed by a volunteer board of trustees and ran entirely by volunteers. Before becoming an independent Pride organization, the event was run by various local LGBT groups, including the Greater Cincinnati Gay & Lesbian Coalition (1978–1993), the independent committee known as Cincinnati Pride (2000–2004), the Gay and Lesbian Center of Greater Cincinnati (2004–2009), and the Greater Cincinnati Gay Chamber of Commerce (2010–2013).
