= Northside, Cincinnati =

Northside
- Neighborhood of Cincinnati
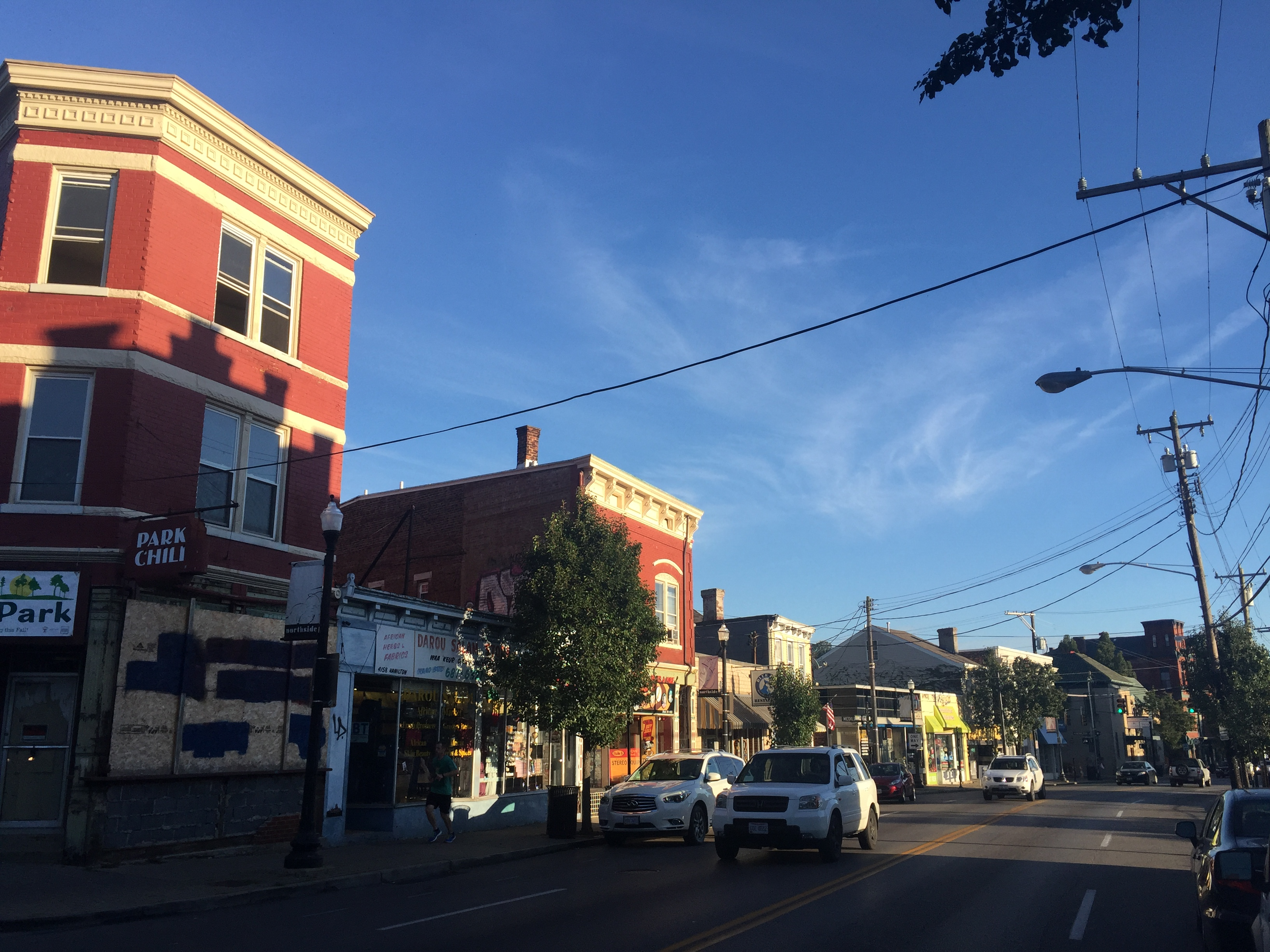
- Hamilton Avenue dissects the neighborhood of Northside

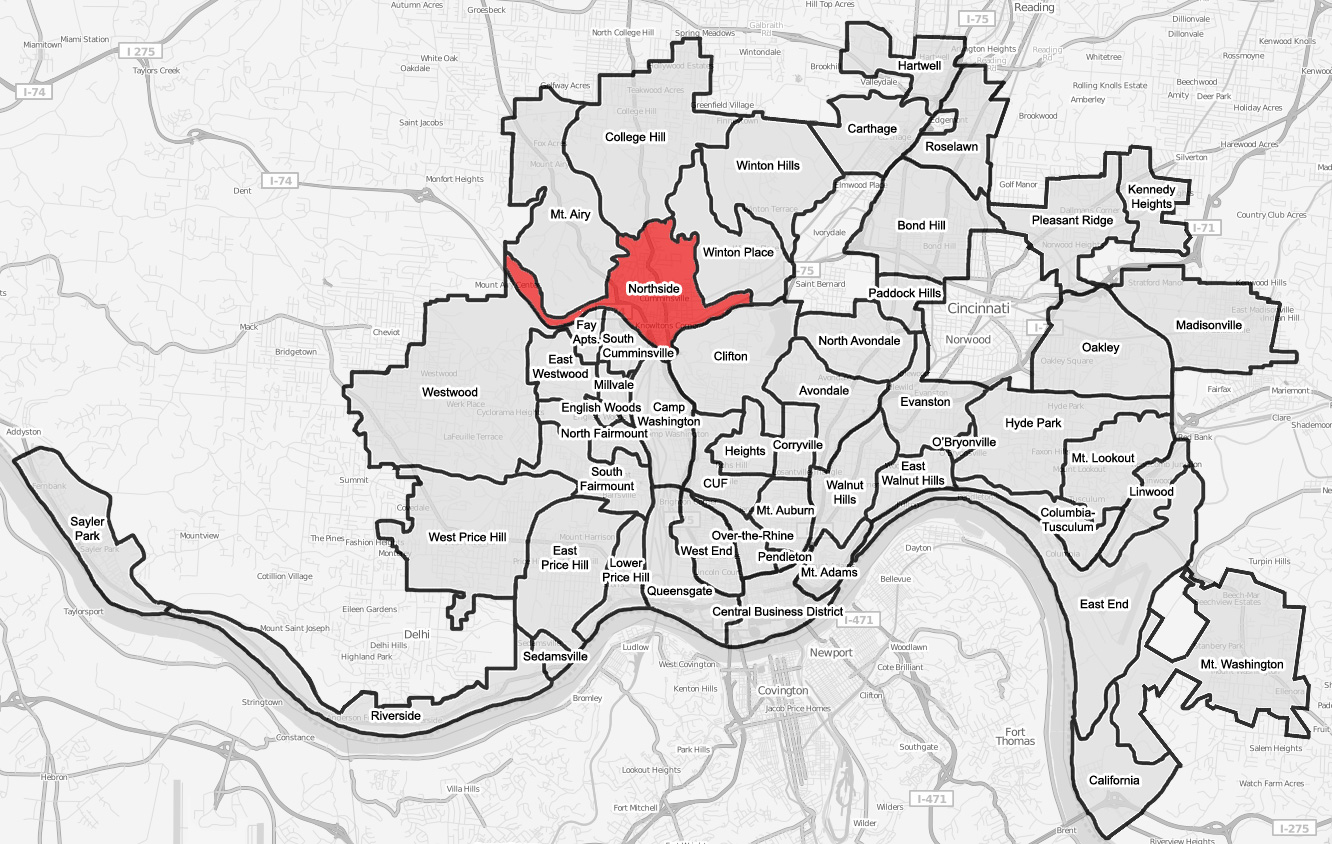
- Northside is a neighborhood of Cincinnati, Ohio.

- Location in Ohio Location in the United States
- Coordinates: 39°09′38″N 84°32′22″W
- Country: United States
- State: Ohio
- County: Hamilton
- City: Cincinnati

Population (2020)
  - Total: 8,096
- ZIP code: 45223

Northside is one of the 52 neighborhoods of Cincinnati, Ohio. Northside was originally known as Cumminsville, but the construction of I-74 in 1974 divided Cumminsville into North and South Cumminsville, and by the 1980s, North Cumminsville became known as Northside.

Northside has a racially and socio-economically diverse population, with concentrations of college students, artists, young professionals, and many members of the creative class. It is also the city's gay village, hosting several local LGBT organizations and events. The population was 8,096 at the 2020 census.

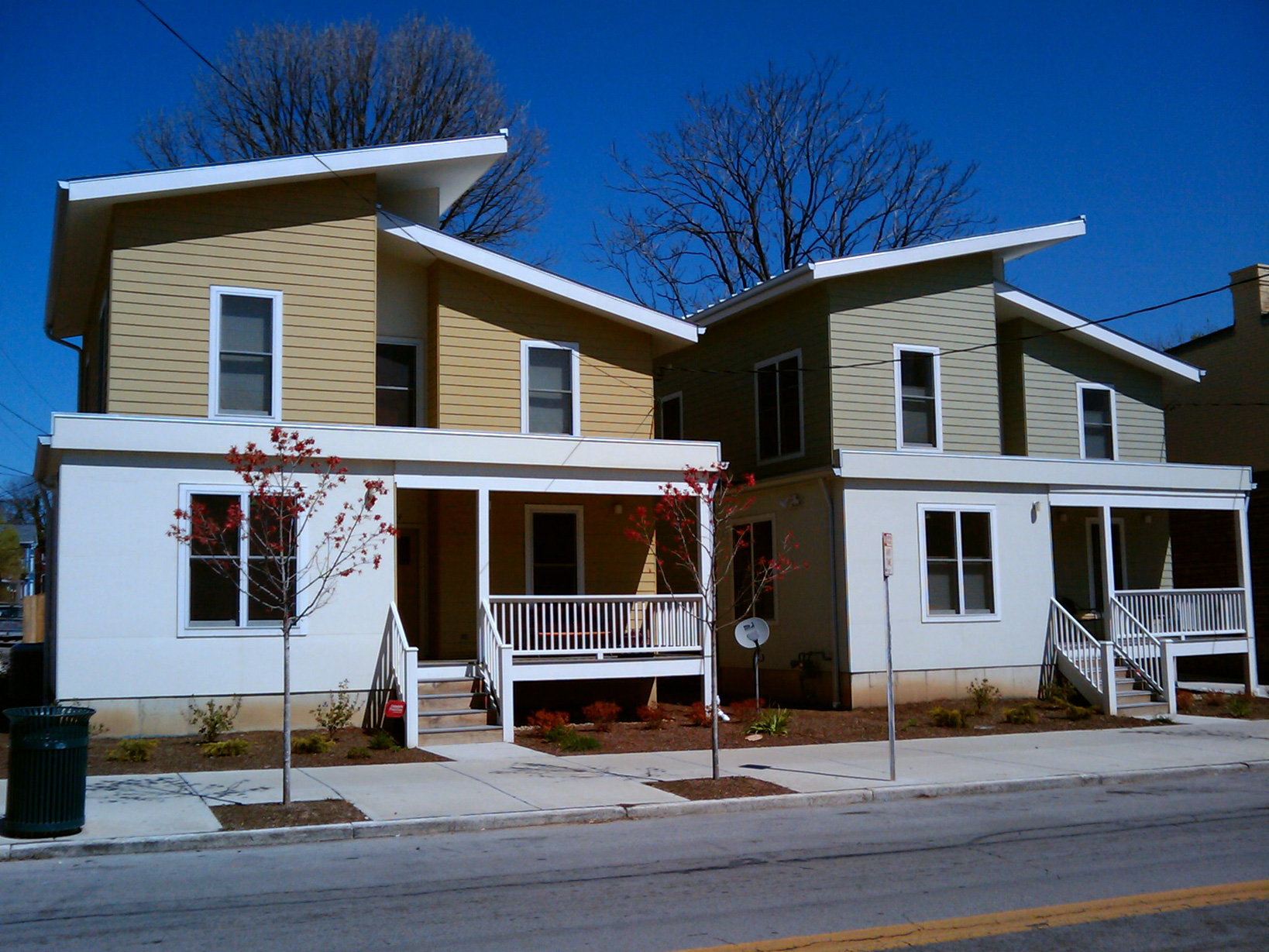
Two LEED-certified "Green" homes at the corner of Chase and Fergus

== History ==
Northside was a small settlement in Native American territory until the introduction of the Miami and Erie Canal in the 1820s caused the population to grow. The settlement became known as "Cumminsville" after David Cummins, one of site's original settlers. He ran a tannery, served as a judge in Indiana, and may have been the first "born of Cincinnati".

In 1873, Cumminsville was annexed by the city of Cincinnati. The area continued to grow through the 1920s, with the neighborhood's business district, Knowlton's Corner, becoming one of the busiest commercial areas in the city. However, once the highway system was put in place, residents no longer had reason to live near work, resulting in migration out to the suburbs. Once people left, housing prices dropped and people with less money moved in. With less income, they could not afford to patronize local businesses, causing an economic decline. By the 1960s most of the industry in Cumminsville had left. However, in the 1980s the area began to grow in popularity due to its undervalued homes. Among the buildings that survived this transition were the two Domhoff Buildings, located at the junction of Chase and Hamilton Avenues. Seen as key to this redevelopment process was the restoration of the abandoned former factory of the American Can Company on Spring Grove Avenue; a longtime neighborhood eyesore, it was redeveloped in the late 2000s as part of a process to enhance the neighborhood's attractiveness to outsiders.

== Geography ==
Northside is bordered by the neighborhoods of Clifton, Mount Airy, Spring Grove Village, College Hill, and Westwood.

== Demographics ==
Population of Northside 1880-2020
Year	Pop.	±%
1880	5,622	—
1890	9,974	+77.4%
1900	9,031	−9.5%
1910	10,961	+21.4%
1920	13,000	+18.6%
1930	14,421	+10.9%
1940	15,078	+4.6%
1950	13,539	−10.2%
1960	13,645	+0.8%
1970	11,270	−17.4%
1980	11,884	+5.4%
1990	10,527	−11.4%
2000	9,389	−10.8%
2010	7,467	−20.5%
2020	8,096	+8.4%
Wards were combined with South Cumminsville so numbers prior to 1900 include population of South Cumminsville.

As of the census of 2020, there were 8,096 people living in the neighborhood. There were 4,685 housing units. The racial makeup of the neighborhood was 65.2% White, 23.8% Black or African American, 0.3% Native American, 1.7% Asian, 0.1% Pacific Islander, 1.5% from some other race, and 7.4% from two or more races. 3.2% of the population were Hispanic or Latino of any race.

There were 3,910 households, out of which 41.5% were families. 20.6% of all households were made up of individuals.

17.0% of the neighborhood's population were under the age of 18, 71.6% were 18 to 64, and 11.4% were 65 years of age or older. 50.9% of the population were male and 49.1% were female.

According to the U.S. Census American Community Survey, for the period 2016-2020 the estimated median annual income for a household in the neighborhood was $56,169. About 10.5% of family households were living below the poverty line. About 49.6% of adults had a bachelor's degree or higher.

== Culture ==
Northside has been described as "hip," "alternative," "progressive," and "liberal." There are numerous shops and restaurants in the neighborhood, most of them independently owned. Northside has been noted as "one of the best dining neighborhoods in [Cincinnati]." and has many vegan and vegetarian restaurants.

The neighborhood's popular Fourth of July celebrations, which include the Northside Fourth of July Parade and the Northside Rock and Roll Carnival draw citizens from across the region.

Northside's community includes an urban garden co-op as well as a volunteer bicycle co-op that promotes cycling to residents. To combat crime Northside's community replaced a troubled corner with two "green" homes.

=== LGBT Community ===
Northside is commonly known as one of Cincinnati's primary LGBTQ neighborhoods. It became home to the Gay & Lesbian Community Center of Greater Cincinnati in 1999 until November 9, 2013 (Center became an "on-line entity" making grants to the local LGBTQIA+ allied community). The Cincinnati Pride Parade and Festival was held in Hoffner Park along Hamilton Avenue for a decade (2000 - 2009). Beginning in 2010, the Greater Cincinnati Gay Chamber of Commerce began organizing the Greater Cincinnati Pride Parade moving it to Downtown. In the same year, local community members wanted there to be a continuing " gay pride presence" in the neighborhood and the first Northside Pride event was held in August in Hoffner Park and along the Hamilton Avenue business district. This effort to keep a gay "pride event" in Northside ended in 2012. Currently, the July 4 neighborhood parade also has a strong LGBTQIA+ allied presence.

== Notable people ==
- Peter Fossett, ex-slave, minister, caterer, Underground Railroad conductor
- Sarah M. Fossett, Peter's wife, desegregated streetcars in 1860
- C. E. Morgan, writer, grew up in Northside and set a portion of her novel The Sport of Kings in the neighborhood

== See also ==
- Hoffner Historic District
