= Grace Church (Cincinnati, Ohio) =

- U.S. National Register of Historic Places
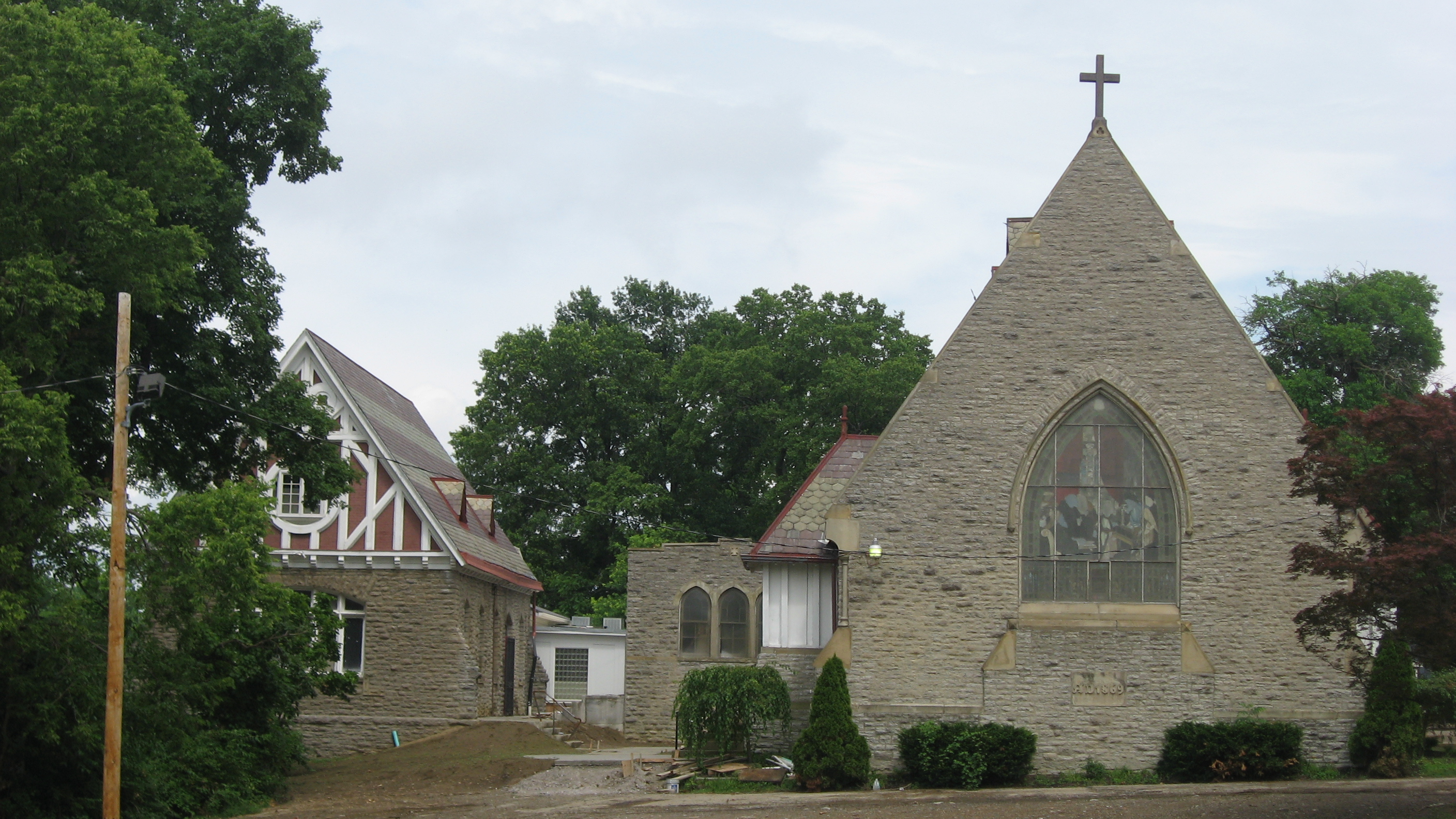
- Front of the church
- Location: 3626 Reading Road; Cincinnati, Ohio
- Coordinates: 39°8′55.95″N 84°29′17.69″W
- Architect: James W. McLaughlin; Albert C. Nash
- Architectural style: Gothic Revival
- NRHP reference No.: 82003581
- Added to NRHP: September 16, 1982

St. Michael and All Angels Episcopal Church, formerly known as Grace Church, is an historic church in Cincinnati, Ohio. It is the only church in the North Avondale neighborhood listed on the National Register of Historic Places. On September 16, 1982, it was added to the National Register of Historic Places. Four of the original stained glass windows carry the signature Tiffany Studios, New York City. They were sold to The Cincinnati Art Museum to fund renovations on the main sanctuary in 2010.

St. Michael's Church was closed on Easter Sunday 2008.

The building now houses Gabriel's Place, which intends “to provide a safe, beautiful, and spiritually nourishing place for the Avondale Community to gather in mutual respect to learn, interact, and go out in peace." It was dedicated in 2011. Events such as free meals and gardening classes are held there.
