= Domhoff Buildings =

- U.S. National Register of Historic Places
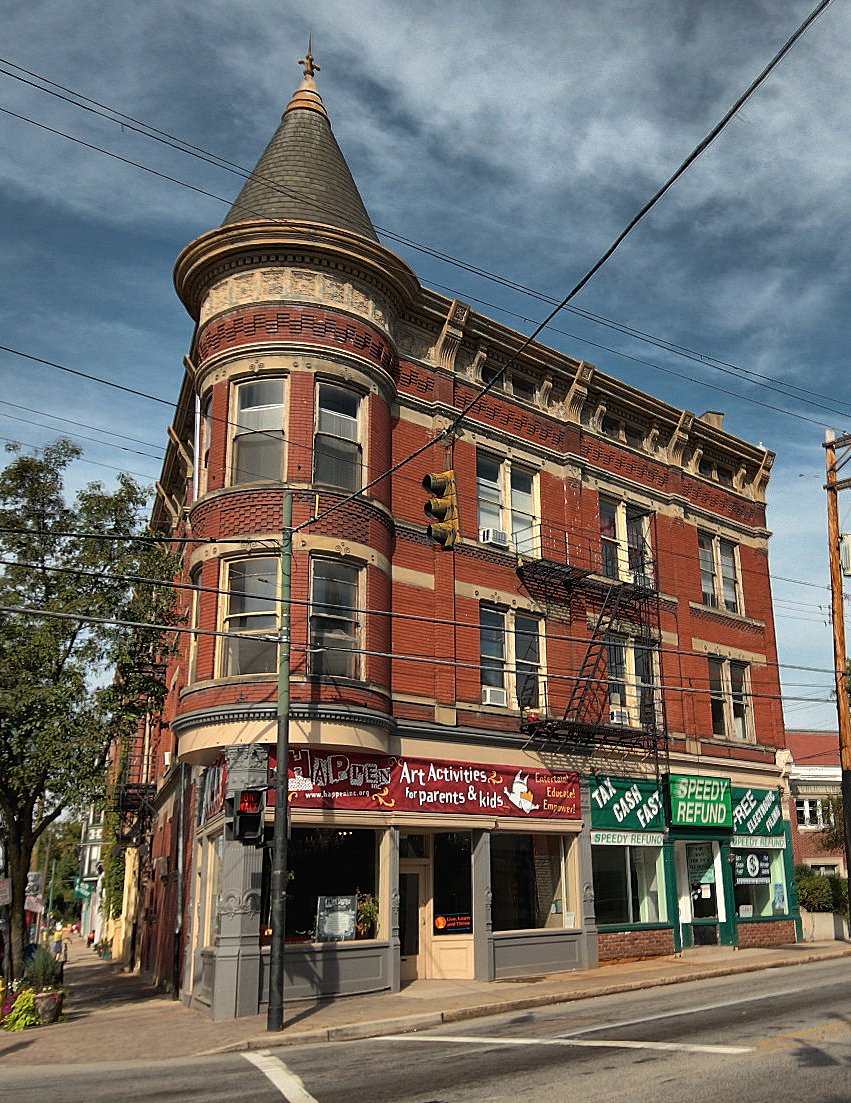
- View from the center of the intersection

- Location within Ohio Location within the United States
- Location: 4201-4203 Hamilton Ave. and 1604-1614 Chase Ave., Cincinnati, Ohio
- Coordinates: 39°9′45″N 84°32′22″W
- Area: 0.2 acres (0.081 ha)
- Built: 1893
- Architect: W.W. Franklin
- Architectural style: Italianate, Queen Anne
- NRHP reference No.: 80003047
- Added to NRHP: March 11, 1980

The Domhoff Buildings are a pair of historic commercial buildings in the Northside neighborhood of Cincinnati, Ohio, United States. Designed by architect W.W. Franklin, the two buildings are located on one corner of the junction of Hamilton and Chase Avenues, that neighborhood's most important intersection.

Charles Henry Domhoff was a manufacturing magnate in late nineteenth-century Cincinnati. After joining a firm known as Addy, Hall, and Company in 1871, a company that manufactured pig iron in the Cincinnati area, he became its senior partner in 1888. Seven years later, he branched out on his own, founding the Domhoff and Joyce Company to manufacture pig iron and coke. While a partner with the Addy Company, he purchased a lot on the corner of Hamilton and Chase Avenues and arranged for the construction of two commercial buildings on the site. Completed in 1893, the two buildings are built of brick with metal roofs and minor elements of stone and metal. The two four-story structures were erected adjacent to each other, with only a small service yard separating them; the streetside portions of the buildings have room for five businesses, while the upper floors are divided into seventeen apartments. Neither building fits clearly into any single architectural style: because they were erected at a time when the Italianate style was losing favor and the Queen Anne style was becoming more common, they display some elements of each style.

In 1980, the Domhoff Buildings were listed on the National Register of Historic Places, qualifying for this distinction because of their well preserved historic architecture.
