= Trinity Episcopal Church (Parkersburg, West Virginia) =

Historic church in West Virginia, United States

- U.S. National Register of Historic Places
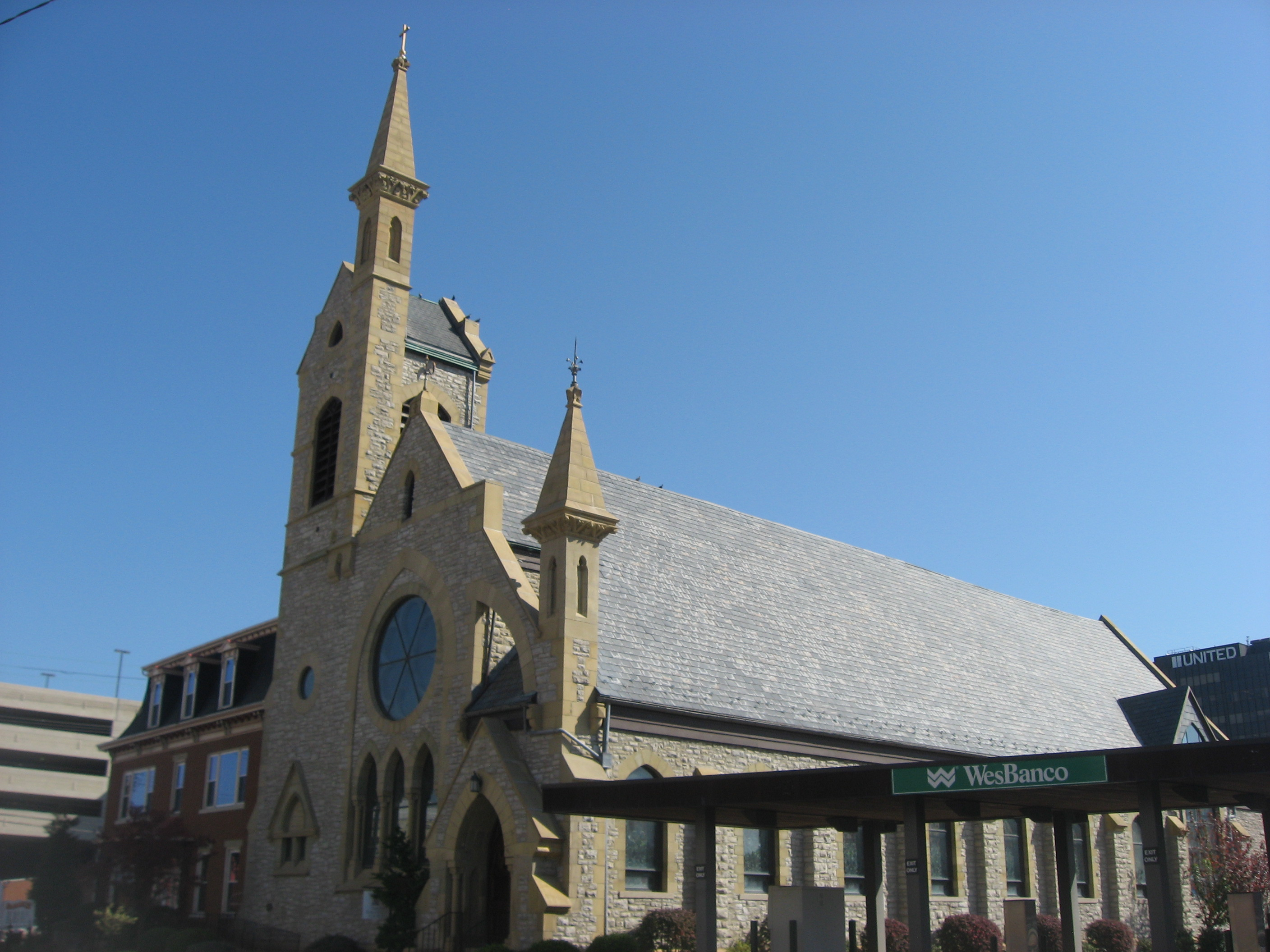
- Front and side of the church

- Location within West Virginia Location within the United States
- Location: 430 Juliana St., Parkersburg, West Virginia
- Coordinates: 39°15′58″N 81°33′41″W
- Area: 0.2 acres (0.081 ha)
- Built: 1878
- Architect: Albert C. Nash
- Architectural style: Late Gothic Revival
- MPS: Downtown Parkersburg MRA
- NRHP reference No.: 82001790
- Added to NRHP: December 10, 1982

Trinity Episcopal Church is a historic Episcopal church located in Parkersburg, Wood County, West Virginia. The congregation is part of the Episcopal Diocese of West Virginia.

In 2017, the church reported 224 members; in 2023, it reported 180 members. No membership statistics were reported in 2024 national parochial reports. Plate and pledge financial support reported by the church in 2024 was $375,031. Average Sunday Attendance (ASA) reported in 2024 was 83 persons. This was a relative decrease from ASA of 109 reported in 2020.

The church's rector is the Rev. Geoffrey Mackey.

Trinity Episcopal Church is locally renowned for the annual used book sale held each fall by its Episcopal Church Women (ECW) group. They are also well known for their Monday feeding ministry where they feed between 120 and 170 meals each Monday between 11:00 AM and noon.

== History and building ==
Records indicate that Episcopal services were conducted as early as 1815 by itinerant clergymen, but there was not a building so services were conducted in the county court. In 1843, the Rt. Rev. William Meade, Bishop of Virginia, sent the Rev. Thomas Smith to be the vicar of a small congregation. The church property was given by John Snodgrass, a member of congress from this district. The first church's building began in 1846, and Smith died at age 48, before its completion. He was buried, by his request, under the front steps. He felt he was "a poor sinner and wanted to be trampled under the feet of all who entered." The first church was completed in 1850, with the rectory built in 1863, and occupied until 1919, when it was turned into office buildings and Sunday school rooms. The old church was torn down in 1878, and the present building completed and consecrated in 1879. The church's foundation stones come from Quincy Hill quarry. In 1913, the church was flooded and pews were taken up and stored higher, but the organ, furnaces and floor was destroyed. Another flood occurred in 1937, however, this one was not as severe, yet the pews were replaced. Trinity Hall was built in 1881, financed by children via plays and bake sales, with the cost totaling $750. The building was listed on the National Register of Historic Places in 1982.
