= State Bank of Wisconsin =

- U.S. National Register of Historic Places
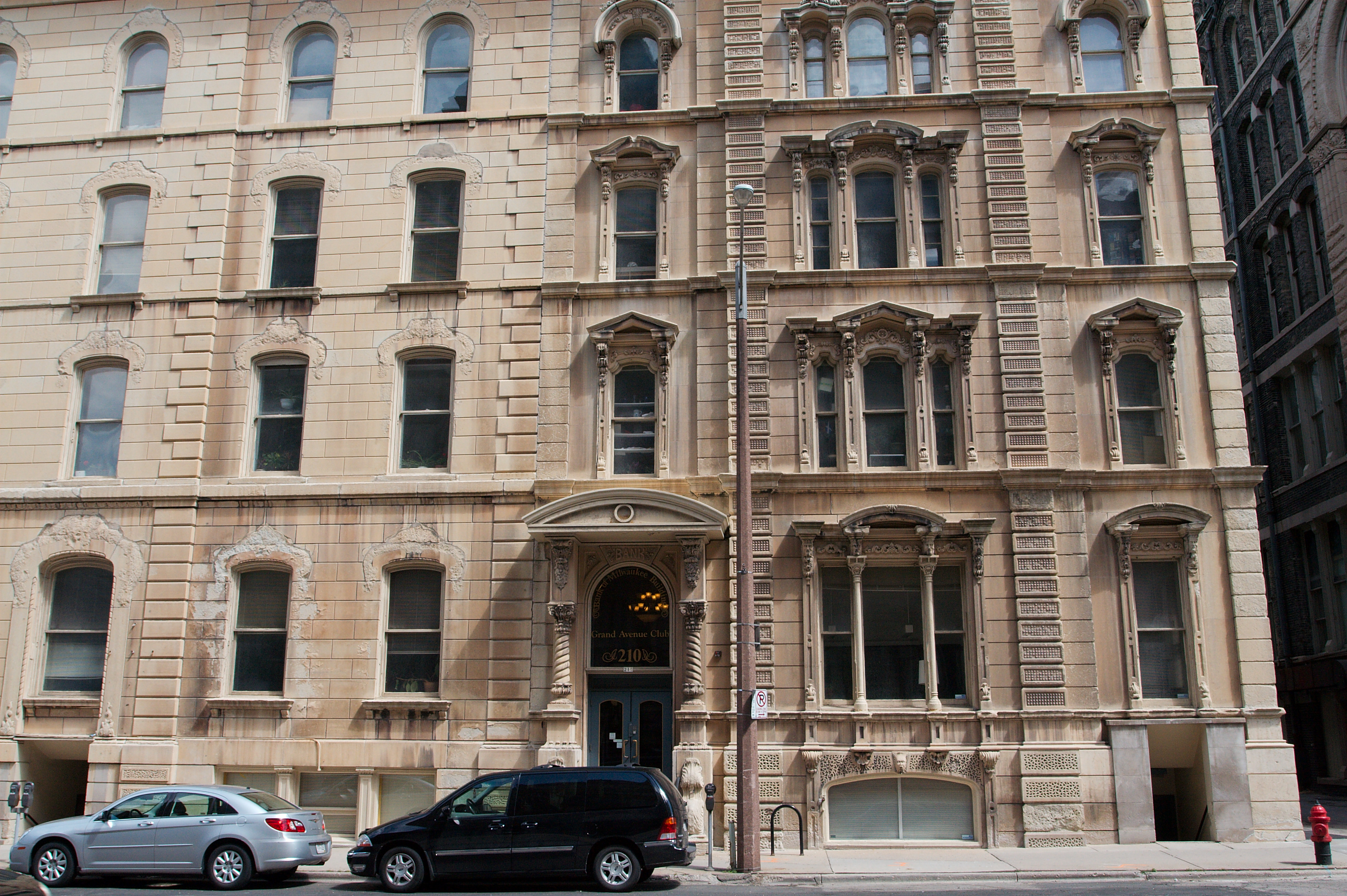
- State Bank of Wisconsin
- Location: 210 E. Michigan St. Milwaukee, Wisconsin
- Coordinates: 43.03761°N 87.9087°W
- Built: 1856/1858/1903
- Architect: Mygatt & Schmidtner/Albert C. Nash/Ferry & Clas
- Architectural style: Italian Renaissance Revival
- NRHP reference No.: 84003742
- Added to NRHP: March 8, 1984

The State Bank of Wisconsin is a six-story Neoclassical-styled office building built in 1906 in Milwaukee, Wisconsin, United States. It was added to the National Register of Historic Places in 1984.

== History ==
In 1852 Wisconsin passed a referendum in favor of establishing commercial banks under state charter. With that, the Banking Act of 1852 was enacted. In 1853 Eliphalet Cramer founded the State Bank of Wisconsin under the Act, and in 1855 Charles D. Nash founded the Bank of Milwaukee. These were two of the fifteen "state banks" chartered in Milwaukee.

Cramer's State Bank of Wisconsin building was constructed starting in 1856. Its designer is uncertain, but it was probably George W. Mygatt and Leonhardt A. Schmidtner, given other projects that they did for Cramer. The building was in Italian Renaissance Revival style - four stories on a raised basement, with a wooden framework clad in limestone from near Joliet, Illinois, with corner quoins, a projecting cornice, and a cast iron entablature.

Charles Nash's Bank of Milwaukee was constructed next door in 1858. It was designed by his relative Albert C. Nash very similar to the Bank of Wisconsin next door, but with hoods over the windows. The two buildings shared a common party wall.

In a 1903 project undertaken by Ferry & Clas, the buildings were joined together. After a portion of the building collapsed in 1956, the damaged areas were re-built with limestone that had been salvaged from the wreck and cream-colored brick.
