= Hoffner Historic District =

Historic district in Ohio, United States

- U.S. National Register of Historic Places
- U.S. Historic district
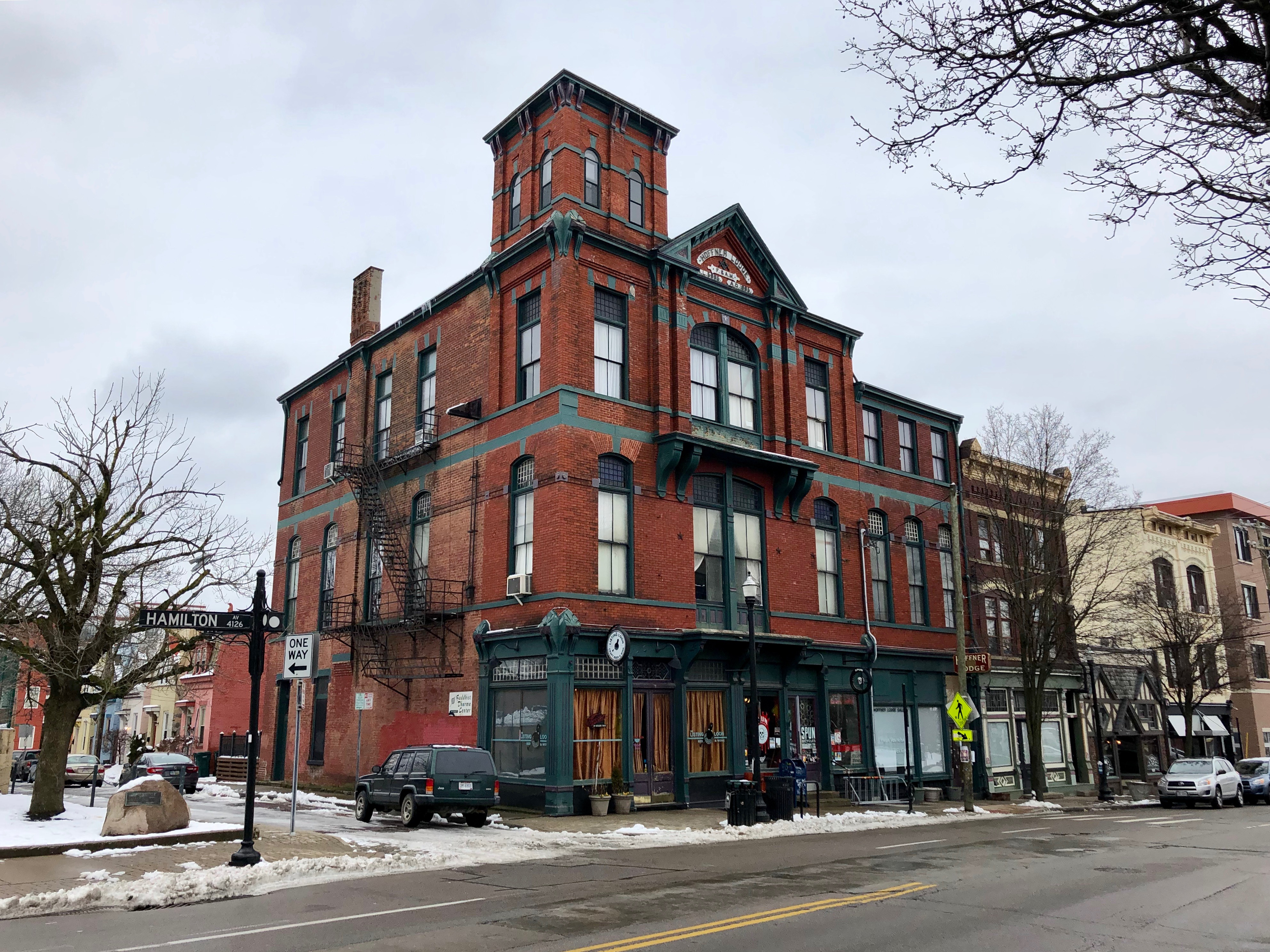
- Hoffner Lodge flanked by the residences on Moline Court at left, and the commercial buildings on Hamilton Avenue at right, in 2019

- Location within Ohio Location within the United States
- Location: Bounded by Blue Rock, Moline Court, Langland, and Hamilton Aves., Cincinnati, Ohio
- Coordinates: 39°9′38″N 84°32′22″W
- Area: 5 acres (2.0 ha)
- Built: 1873
- Architectural style: Italianate
- NRHP reference No.: 78002077
- Added to NRHP: October 3, 1978

The Hoffner Historic District is a historic collection of buildings in the Northside neighborhood of Cincinnati, Ohio, United States. Built primarily at the end of the nineteenth century, the district has experienced few changes since it was built, and it has been named a historic site.

It is composed of twelve buildings in an area of 5 acres (2.0 ha), of which eleven contribute to its historic nature. The buildings are four commercial buildings along Hamilton Avenue, including the Hoffner Lodge at the corner; six small private residences on Moline Court; and the Myron Johnson Lumber Company building behind them on Langland Street. The southern portion of the block was in the 1970s occupied by a non-contributing gas station, which has since been replaced with a new apartment complex.

The district qualified for the National Register because of its distinctive historic architecture; built largely in the Italianate style, the buildings demonstrate the influence of German cultural influences in their uniform construction methods. Several houses are located in the district, along with a train station, a Masonic lodge, and a former train station.

== History ==
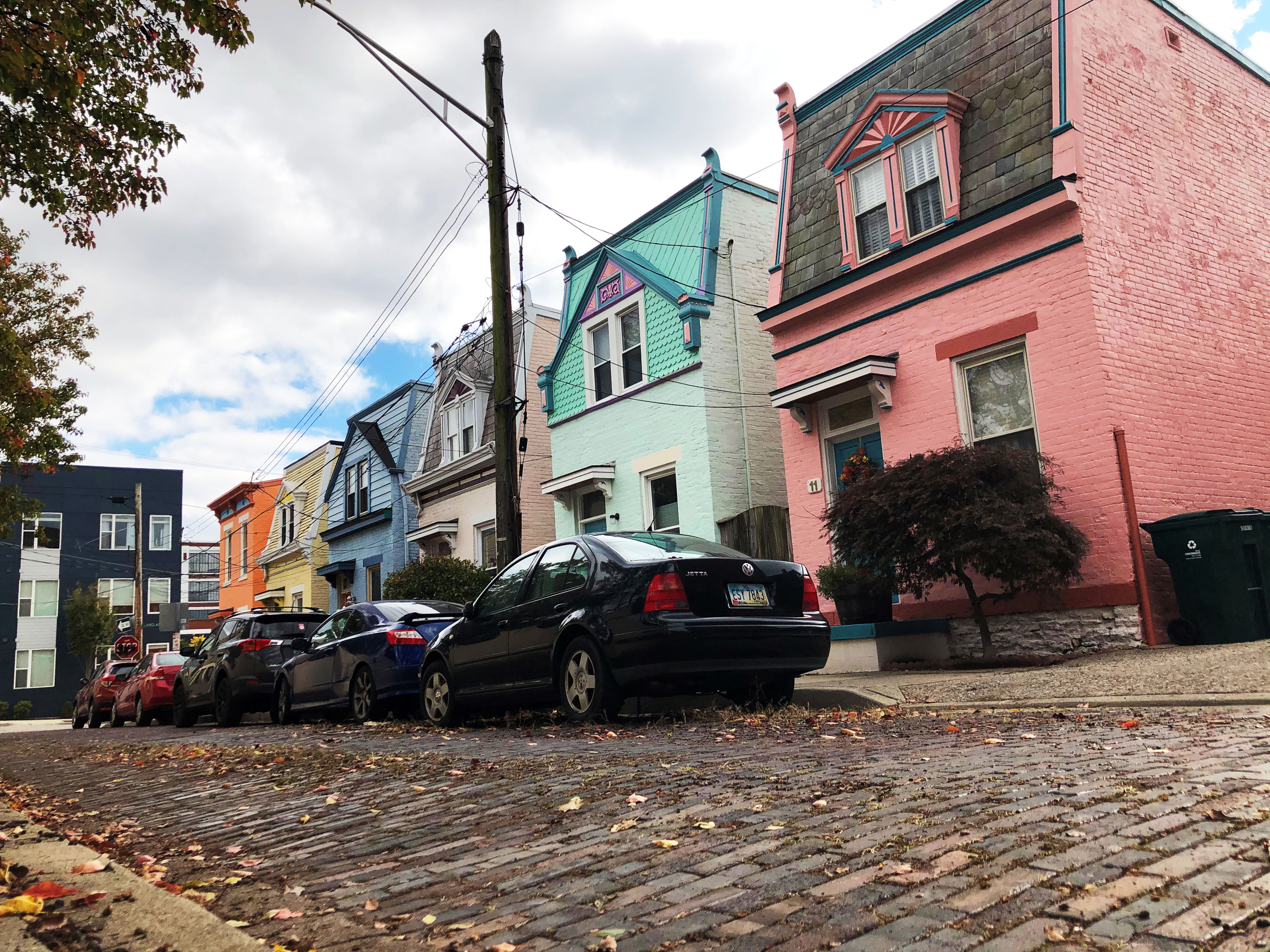
The residences on Moline Court in 2020

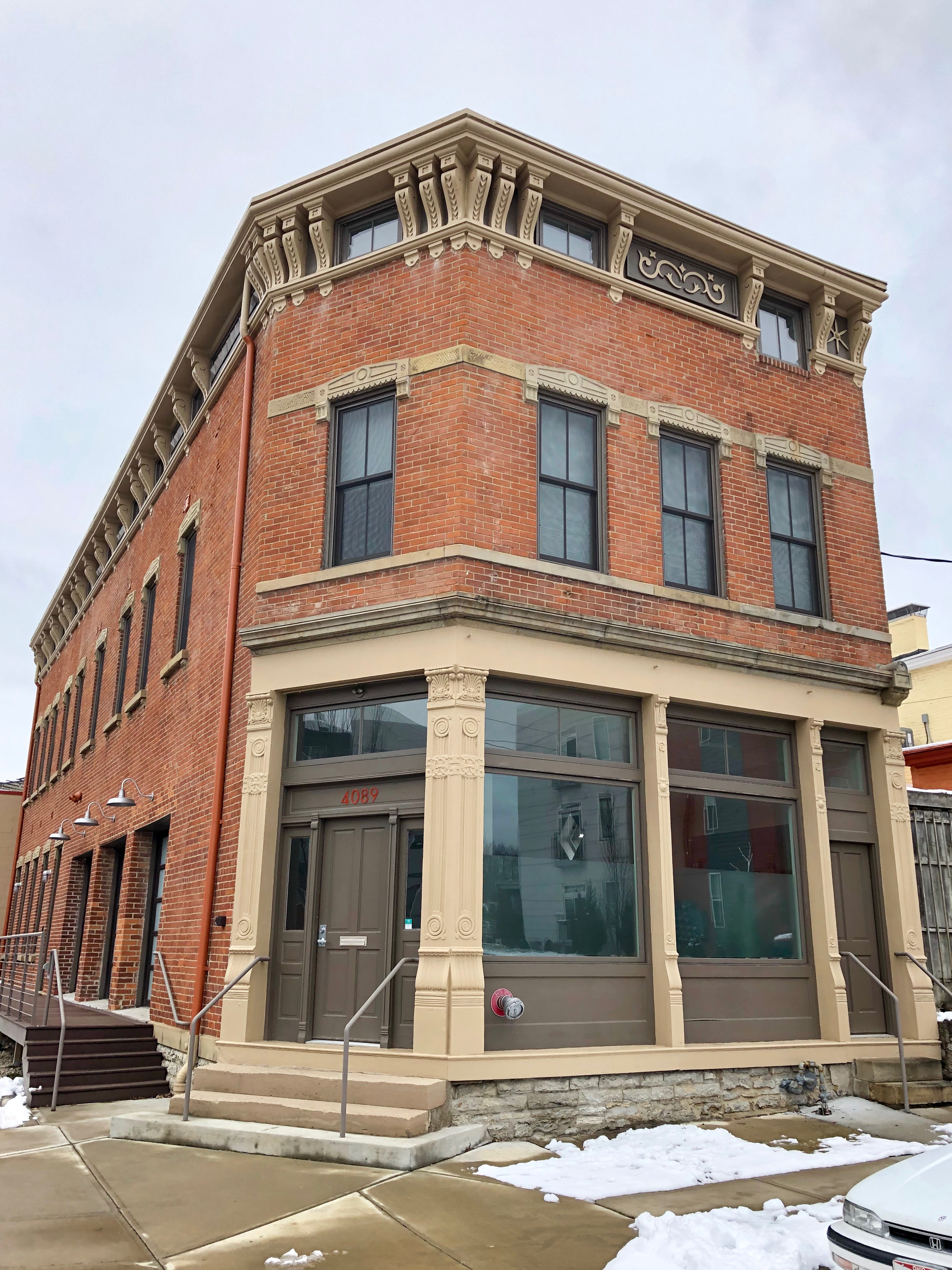
The Myron Johnson Lumber Company building in 2019

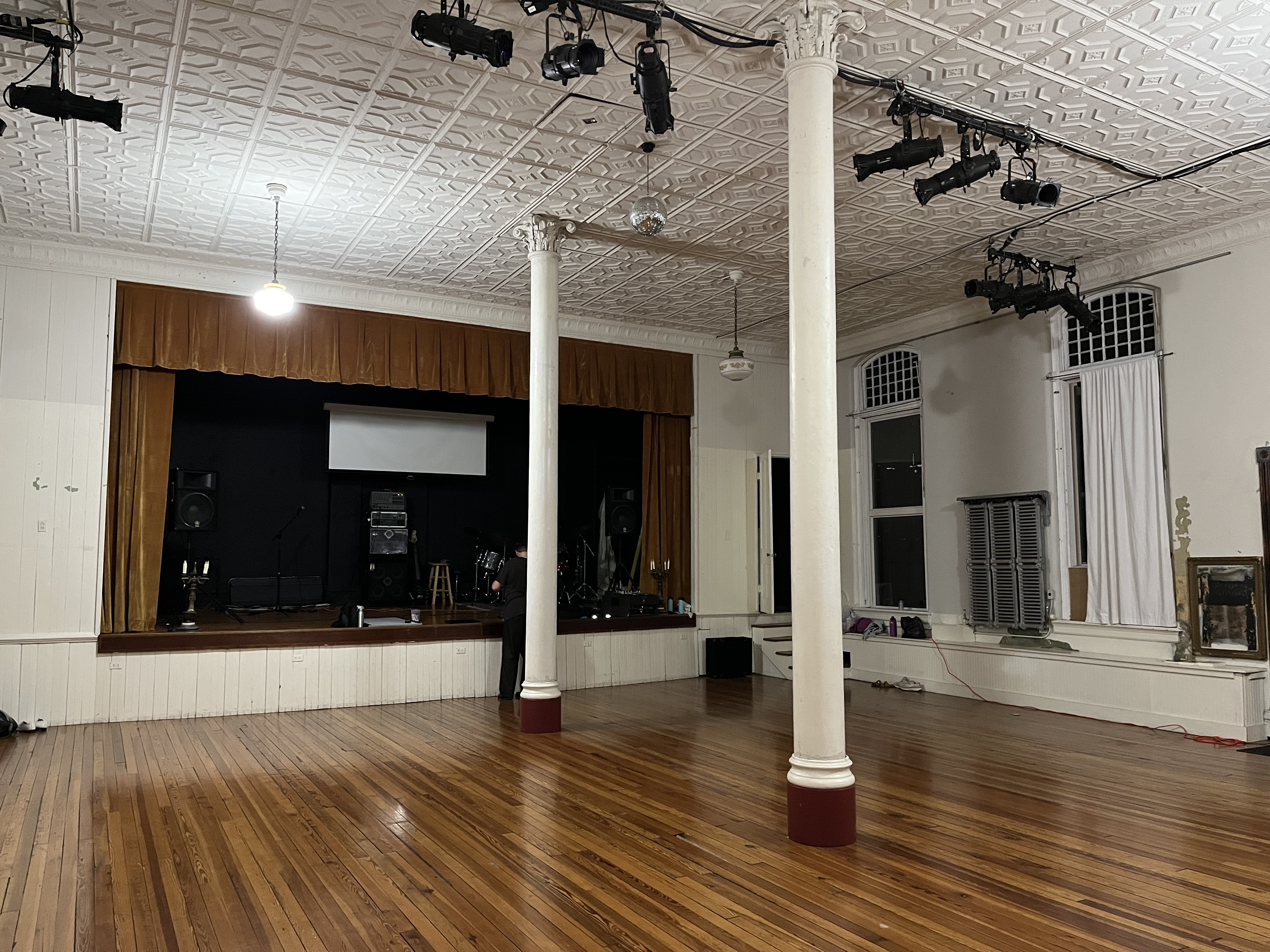
Second floor of the Hoffner Lodge

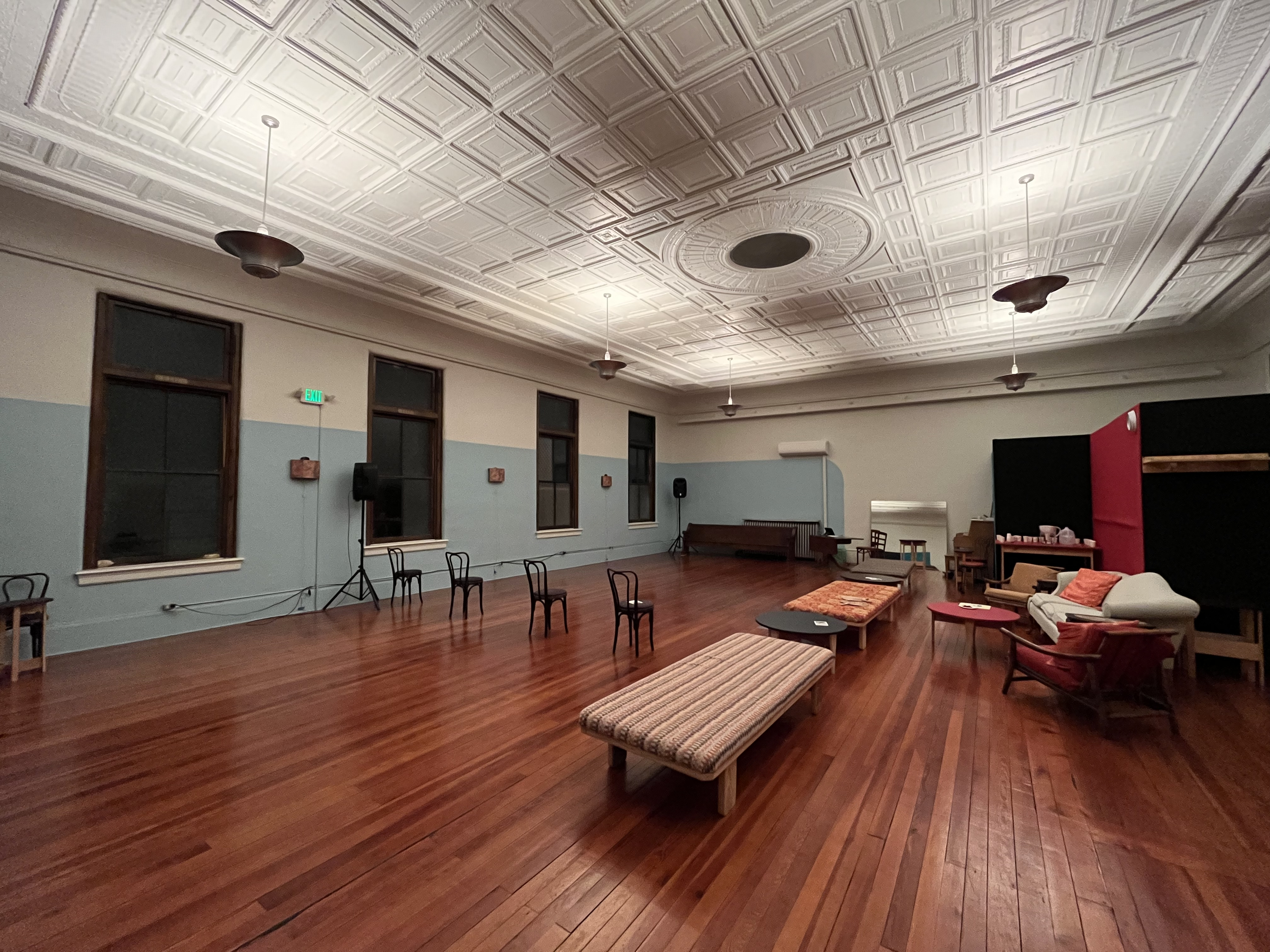
Third floor of the Hoffner Lodge

Northside, also known as "Cumminsville", was first owned by John Cleves Symmes as part of his Symmes Purchase. Included within the boundaries of Mill Creek Township, the land was bought by Ezekiel Hutchinson and David Cummings in 1811 and 1817 respectively; the two men owned what is now the neighborhood's western and eastern portions, respectively. Both lands were bought by wealthy landowner Jacob Hoffner in 1836; he turned them into some of the grounds of an estate of more than 400 acres (160 ha). The estate failed to endure: Hoffner resided at the estate until his 1891 death, but the grounds were quickly subdivided and sold. Before long, the district's buildings had been constructed, and since the 1890s the neighborhood has experienced numerous changes: despite overwhelming technological advancement since the 1890s, the district retains its original appearance of a small village whose businesses can fulfill all needs of all residents within easy walking distance of their homes.

In 1978, the Hoffner Historic District was officially designated and listed on the National Register of Historic Places.
