= Cincinnati Work House and Hospital =

Coordinates: 39°08′32″N 84°32′13″W

- U.S. National Register of Historic Places
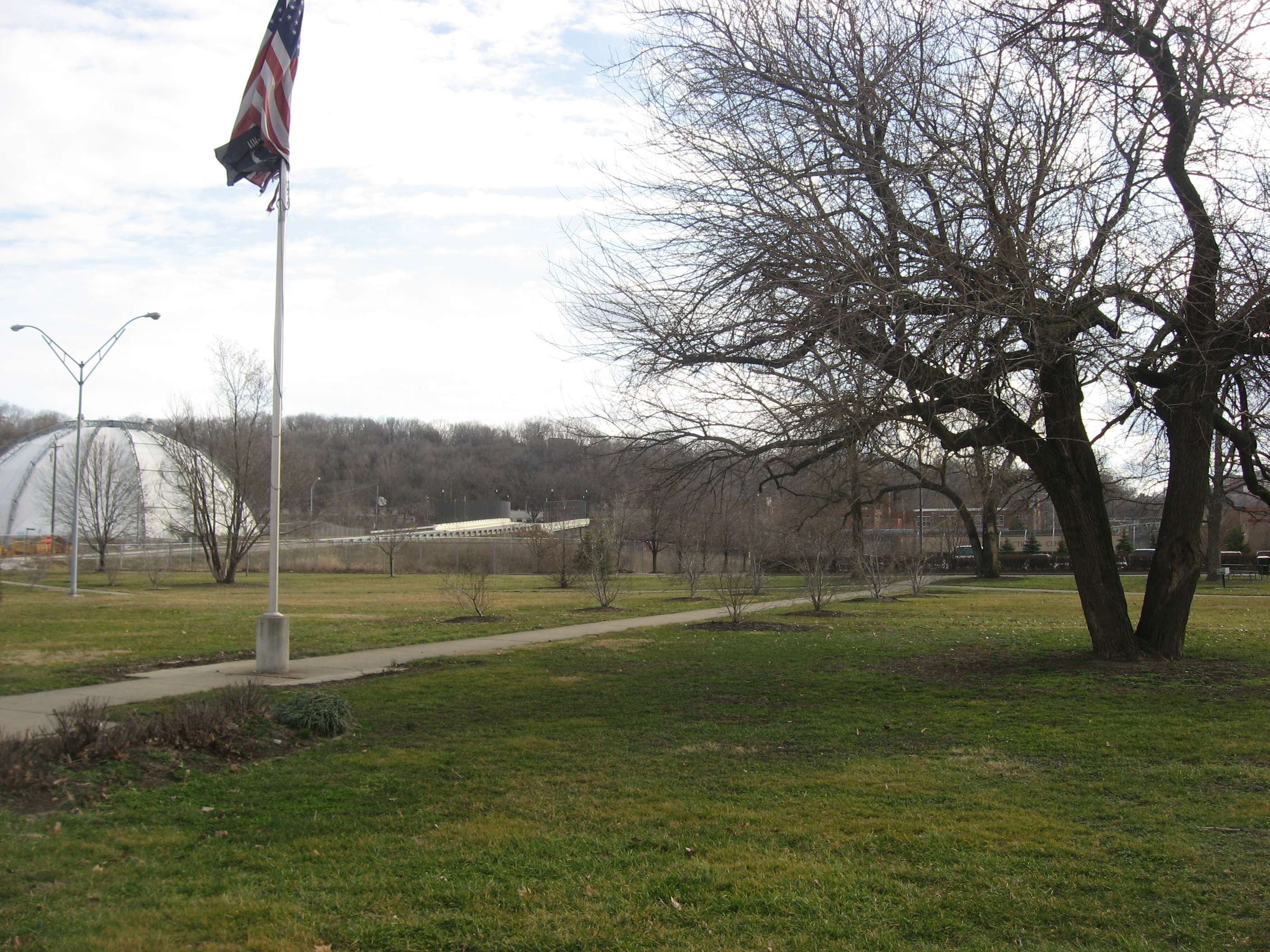
- Site of the work house and hospital
- Location: Cincinnati, Ohio
- Architect: Allison and Anderson & Hannaford
- Architectural style: Romanesque and Other
- NRHP reference No.: 80003044
- Added to NRHP: March 3, 1980

Cincinnati Work House and Hospital was a registered historic building in the neighborhood of Camp Washington, Cincinnati, Ohio, listed in the National Register on March 3, 1980. The jail was built between 1867 and 1869 on 6 acres (2.4 ha) of land.

The City Work House was located on Colerain Avenue upon the grounds of old Camp Washington, used for the rendezvous of Ohio troops during the Mexican War. The buildings were about 510 feet in length, five stories high and from 54 to 60 feet in width. They were designed by Adams and Hannaford and built under the direction of Robert Allison, chairman of the building committee of the Council in the years 1866 to 1890 at the cost of about half a million dollars. In a 1904 report, it had 606 cells and received between about 2,500 and 3,000 prisoners each year.

Prisoners were moved out of the building in the late 1980s and the building was demolished in 1990. Today the site is home to another correctional facility called River City Correctional Center, which treats felons for chemical dependency.

The 1989 film Lock Up starring Sylvester Stallone was shot at the City Work House.

Several artifacts taken from the Work House, including the door of a jail cell and the old prison register, are on display at the Hamilton County Justice Center.
