= Camp Washington =

Camp Washington may refer to:

- Camp Washington, Cincinnati, a residential neighborhood
- Camp Washington, Maryland, the 1928 military installation with the 12th Infantry Regiment
- Camp Washington, Staten Island
- Camp Washington, Connecticut, an Episcopal retreat center
