= Rubbo =

Rubbo is a surname. Notable people with the surname include:

- Antonio Dattilo Rubbo (1870–1955), Italian-born artist and art teacher active in Australia
- Don Rubbo (1926–1979), mentor and guide of Peter Max and an affiliate of Andy Warhol
- Joe Rubbo (born 1963), American film actor and television producer
- Kiffy Rubbo (1944–1980), Australian gallery director and curator
- Mariano Rubbo (born 1988), Uruguayan footballer
- Michael Rubbo (born 1938), Australian filmmaker, screenwriter and publisher
