= Cincinnati Freedom =

Famous jumping cow

- Cincinnati Freedom
- Other name: Charlene Moo-ken
- Species: Bos taurus
- Breed: Charolais
- Born: c. 1995
- Died: December 29, 2008
- Cause of death: spinal cancer
- Known for: Escaping Cincinnati slaughterhouse
- Weight: 1,050 lb (480 kg; 75 st 0 lb)

Cincinnati Freedom (c. 1995 – December 29, 2008), also known as Charlene Moo-ken, after Cincinnati Mayor Charlie Luken, was a 1,050-pound Charolais cow that gained fame when, on February 15, 2002, she leaped over a six-foot fence at Ken Meyers Meats, a Camp Washington (Cincinnati) slaughterhouse, and escaped. After eluding the traps and tranquilizer darts of SPCA officials and police officers for 11 days, she was finally captured just after midnight on February 26 in Clifton, Cincinnati, Ohio. She lived out the rest of her life at Farm Sanctuary's New York Shelter in Watkins Glen, New York, where she was particularly popular with animal rights activists and animal lovers.

Finding a permanent home for her was a source of some debate, as most considered her no longer eligible for slaughter. The Cincinnati Zoo declined to house her, citing health concerns and the possibility that she could not be safely contained. Jan Malley, a Northern Kentucky woman with a 12-acre (49,000 m^{2}) farm, was also considered as a possibility. In late March, however, artist Peter Max offered $180,000 worth of paintings to the SPCA for use at their next auction. In return, he took custody of the cow, whom he named to commemorate not only her dramatic pursuit of liberty, but the city into which she escaped.

Cincinnati Freedom received the key to Cincinnati, but did not wear it during the Cincinnati Reds Findlay Market Opening Day Parade on April 1, 2002, as planned, because she was judged too jumpy and nervous to participate. She was brought to her permanent home at Farm Sanctuary's New York Shelter on April 11, 2002, where she spent the rest of her life. She was reported to be doing well in the sanctuary and had apparently made a number of friends, including Queenie, a cow who escaped from a slaughterhouse in Queens, New York, in 2000.

In 2008, Cincinnati Freedom developed spinal cancer, an incurable and untreatable ailment in cows. She was euthanized on December 29, 2008.
