= Peter Max =

German-born American artist (1937–2026)

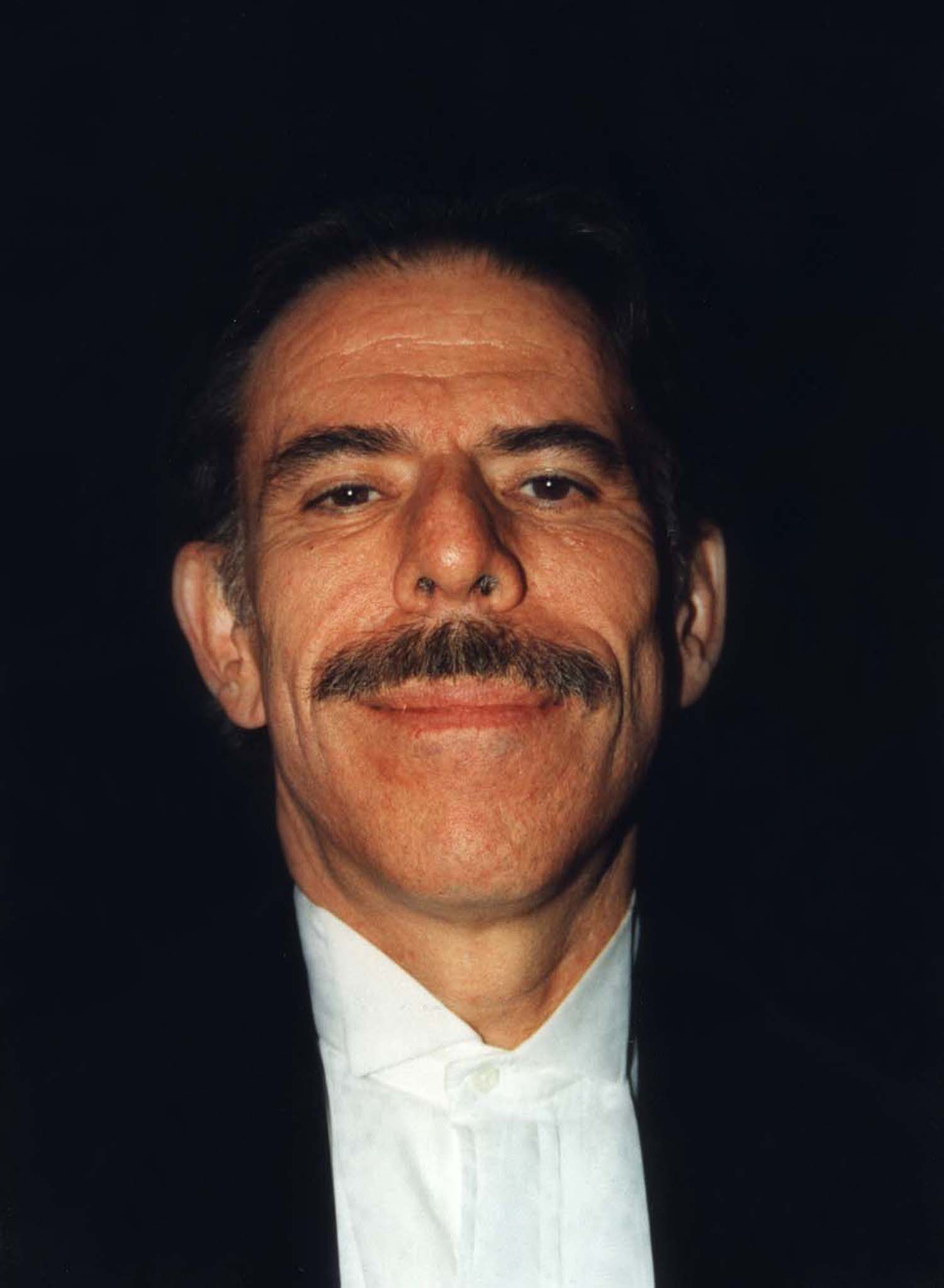
- Max in 1998
- Born: Peter Max Finkelstein; October 19, 1937; Berlin, Germany
- Died: September 14, 2026 (aged 88); New York City, U.S.
- Citizenship: United States (after 1953)
- Education: Art Students League of New York
- Known for: Painting; pop art
- Peter Max's voice At the Republican Eagles Breakfast; Recorded August 16, 1988

Peter Max Finkelstein (October 19, 1937 – September 14, 2026), known professionally as Peter Max, was a German-American artist known for using bright colors in his work. Works by Max are associated with the visual arts and culture of the 1960s, particularly psychedelic art and pop art. He was noted for his artwork that ranged from posters of Day-Glo flowers, butterflies, rainbows, stars, and planets, which, according to The New York Times, "expressed the blissed-out exuberance of the countercultural 1960s". His work was often described as symbolic of the 1960s counterculture movement.

== Early life and education ==
Peter Max Finkelstein was born in Berlin, Germany on October 19, 1937, the son of Salla and Jakob Finkelstein, German Jews. They fled Berlin in 1938, settling in Shanghai, China, where they lived for the next ten years. Peter's time in Shanghai influenced much of his later work. He loved the colors and the "calligraphic ballet" that he witnessed daily at the Buddhist temple across the street from the family villa.

Max's senior yearbook photo; Lafayette High School in 1955

In 1948, the family moved to Haifa, Israel, where they lived for several years. Peter attended school in Mount Carmel, but was often drawing instead of taking notes. His principal suggested to his parents that he take art lessons after school, and he began to study under Professor Hünik, a Viennese Expressionist.

From Israel, the family continued moving westward and stopped in Paris for several months—an experience that Max said greatly influenced his appreciation for art. In their short time in Paris, Max's mother enrolled him in drawing classes at the Louvre, where he began to study Fauvism. After nine months in Paris, Max and his family made their final move, settling in the Brooklyn borough of New York City.

Max and his parents first settled in Bensonhurst, Brooklyn, in 1953 where he attended Lafayette High School, classmates with future actor Paul Sorvino and future Baseball Hall of Fame pitcher Sandy Koufax. In 1956, Max began his formal art training at the Art Students League of New York in Manhattan, studying anatomy, figure drawing and composition under Frank J. Reilly, who had studied at the League alongside Norman Rockwell.

== Career ==
=== 1960s ===
In 1962, Max started a small Manhattan arts studio known as "The Daly & Max Studio", with friend Tom Daly. Daly and Max were joined by friend and mentor Don Rubbo, and the three worked as a group on books and advertising for which they received industry recognition. Much of their work incorporated antique photographic images as elements of collage. Max's interest in astronomy contributed to his self-described "Cosmic '60s" period, which featured psychedelic, counterculture imagery.

In 1967, Max solidified his place as a counter-cultural icon by designing the flyers for the second ever 'Be In', a political gathering of mainly hippies in New York's Central Park after the Easter parade on March 26, 1967.

Max appeared on The Tonight Show on August 15, 1968. He was featured on the cover of Life magazine's September 5, 1969, edition under the heading "Peter Max: Portrait of the artist as a very rich man".

=== 1970s ===
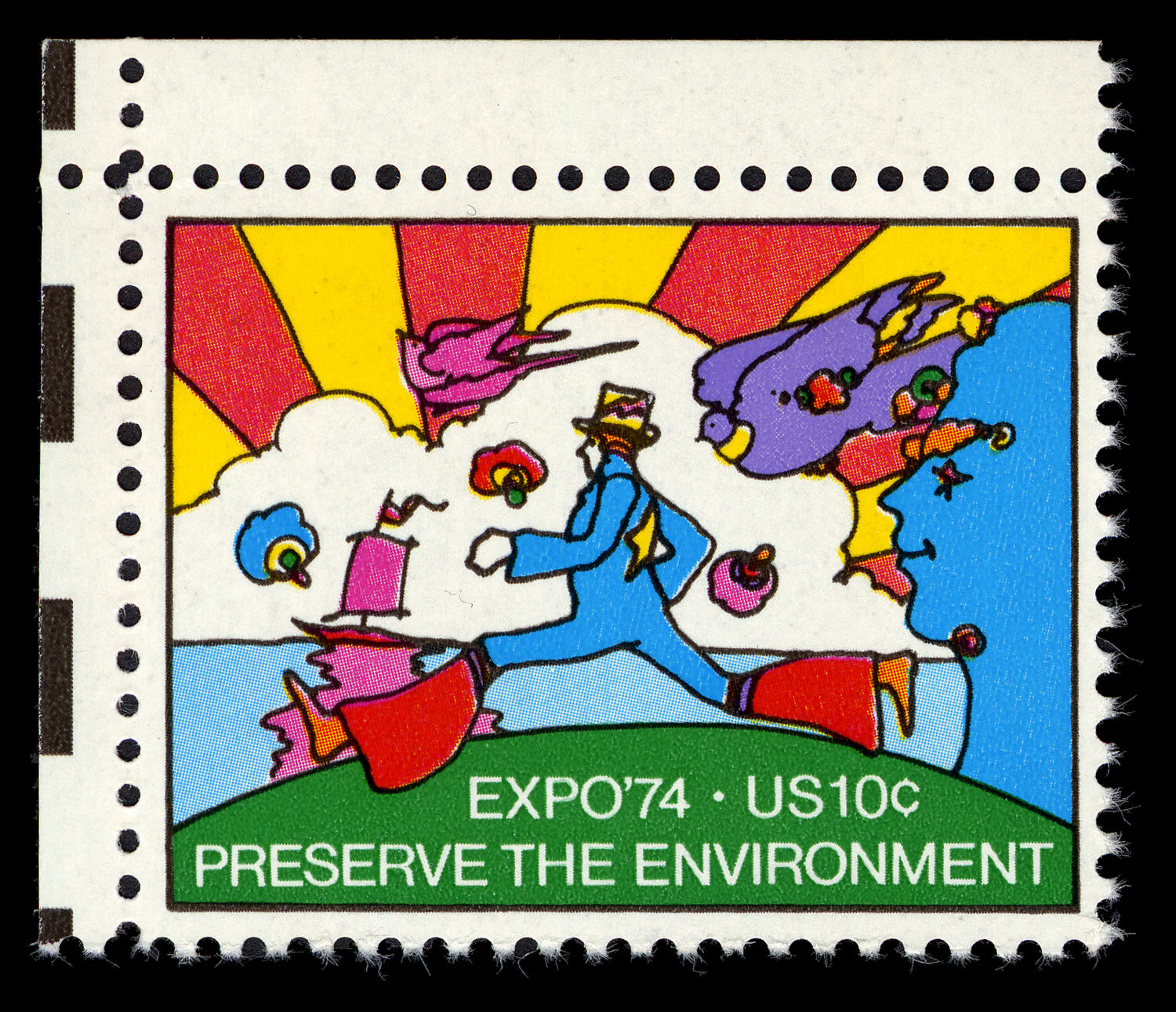
U.S. postage stamp featuring Max's artwork commemorating Expo '74

In 1970, many of Max's products and posters were featured in the exhibition "The World of Peter Max", which opened at the M.H. de Young Memorial Museum in San Francisco. The United States Postal Service commissioned Max to create the 10-cent postage stamp to commemorate the Expo '74 World's Fair in Spokane, Washington, and Max drew a colorful psychedelic scene with a "Cosmic Jumper" and a "Smiling Sage" against a backdrop of a cloud, sun rays and a ship at sea on the theme of "Preserve the Environment". According to The New York Times, "His DayGlo-inflected posters became wallpaper for the turn on, tune in, drop out generation."

On July 4, 1976, Max began his Statue of Liberty series leading to his efforts with Chrysler CEO Lee Iacocca to help in the restoration of the statue. Also that year, "Peter Max Paints America" was commissioned by the ASEA of Sweden. The book project commemorated the United States Bicentennial and included the following foreword: "Peter Max Paints America is based on works of art commissioned by ASEA of Sweden on the 200th anniversary of the founding of the United States of America, in sincere recognition of the historic bonds of friendship between the people of Sweden and the people of the United States, recalling that Sweden was one of the first countries to extend its hand in friendship to the new nation." Max had also been commissioned to design bilingual welcome signs for the U.S. borders, and they were set to be unveiled in 1976; the signs, however, did not go up. Max's stylized signs were considered "too psychedelic" – which to the then-government meant that they encouraged drug use. Despite Max's objections to these accusations, the signs remained in storage until 1977, when the administration change brought a change in attitude. The signs remained in place until 1984, when they were replaced by "more conventional signage".

=== 1980s–2020s ===
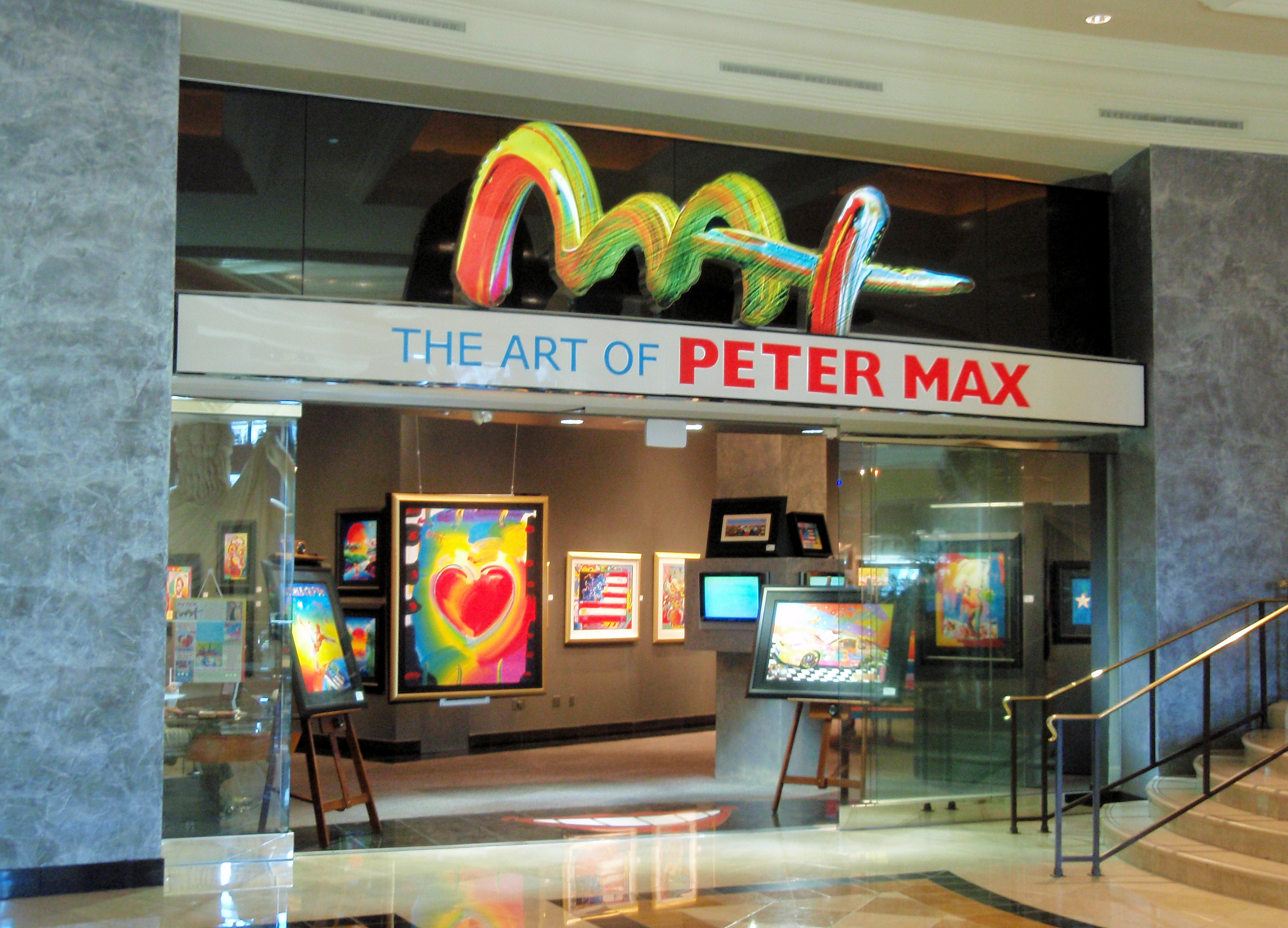
One of Max's art galleries, at The Forum Shops at Caesars in 2008

In 1989, Max designed the cover photo—as well as the 45 rpm single picture-sleeve photo—of Aretha Franklin's Through the Storm album. In that same year, Max painted 40 colorful portraits of Mikhail Gorbachev to celebrate his policy of glasnost and efforts to democratize the Soviet Union. The work was entitled 40 Gorbys.

In 1990, Max purchased a collection of Chevrolet Corvettes for an intended art project, but never used them. They were auctioned off in 2020–2021 and the profits were donated to benefit veterans.

Also in 1990, Max was awarded the rights to a massive section of the Berlin Wall, which was installed at the Intrepid Museum. He chiseled a dove out of the wall and placed it on top, as a symbol of freedom.

Hull art by Peter Max

In 1994, Max designed the artwork for progressive rock band Yes's fourteenth studio album, Talk. In 2012, he was chosen to paint the hull art of the New York-themed ship Norwegian Breakaway by Norwegian Cruise Line.

Max was the official artist for many major events, including the 1994 World Cup, the Grammy Awards, the Rock and Roll Hall of Fame, the Super Bowl and others. In 2000, Max designed the paint scheme Dale Earnhardt drove at The Winston all-star race, deviating from Earnhardt's trademark black car. He was also the Official Artist of the 2000 World Series, the "Subway Series" between the New York Yankees and the New York Mets.

Max first painted Taylor Swift's portrait as a gift to the singer for her Grammy-winning albums Fearless and Speak Now, and later painted new portraits of Swift to commemorate her worldwide success.

In 2019, The New York Times published an investigative journalism piece on Max's current state, revealing that he was suffering from advanced dementia, that he was often unaware of his identity and his surroundings, and that his deteriorated mental state had been exploited in a massive art fraud scheme dating back to at least 2015.

== Work ==
Max's art work was first associated with the counterculture, neo-Fauvism, and psychedelic movements in graphic design during the late 1960s and early 1970s. He is known for having employed bursts of color, often containing much or all of the visible spectrum. In 1970, Max published his first book, Poster Book, containing a collection of his artworks in the form of posters, including a portrait of Toulouse-Lautrec using his signature printing style, a poster for Apollo 11, and a portrait of Bob Dylan. The book was such a success that Max quickly released a follow-up in 1971 called Superposter Book. This edition contained posters from his commercial portfolio, posters about peace and love, and important images from his life and history. Max's repeated claims, varying in detail, to have worked on Yellow Submarine have been denied by the production team.

Max worked in multiple media including painting, drawing, etchings (including aquatint), collage, print making, sculpture, video and digital imagery. He also included "mass media" as being another "canvas" for his creative expression. He collaborated with companies to create clothing, homewares, clocks, and other material goods.

Max (left) at the Luncheon for Volunteer Action Award Winners on April 26, 1991, with Barbara Bush (right) and George H. W. Bush (center)

Max often used American icons and symbols in his artwork. He created paintings of presidents Kennedy, Ford, Carter, Reagan, and Bush in addition to his 100 Clintons—a multiple portrait installation. Additional Max commissions included the creation of the first "Preserve the Environment" postage stamp, in honor of the World's Fair in Spokane, Washington; border murals at entry points to the United States from Canada and Mexico; and exhibitions in over 40 museums and 50 galleries worldwide. He often featured images of celebrities, politicians, athletes and sporting events and other pop culture subjects in his artwork.

One of Continental Airlines' Boeing 777-200ER aircraft (registered N77014) sported a livery designed by Max. His artwork was featured on CBS's The Early Show where his "44 Obamas", commemorating Barack Obama, the 44th President of the United States, debuted. In 2013, HarperCollins published a book of the artist's memoirs and thoughts called The Universe of Peter Max. In it, he related stories of his life as well as descriptions and thoughts surrounding some of his artwork.

== Legal issues ==
In 1997, Max was indicted by a grand jury in United States District Court for federal income tax evasion and pleaded guilty in the Southern District of New York before Senior United States District Judge Kimba Wood of defrauding the Internal Revenue Service by having concealed $1,100,000 in income. The grand jury also indicted Max on charges that he bartered his paintings as part payment for multiple homes in New York State and the U.S. Virgin Islands, but failed to report these transactions on his income tax returns. After learning he was under criminal investigation, the indictment charged, Max and his accountant, Rubin Gorewitz, tried to conceal income from the I.R.S. by faking sales receipts for the bartered art. In exchange for his plea bargain, Max received a felony conviction and was sentenced to a term of two months in prison.

In 2019, the estate of Louis Gottlieb filed a civil lawsuit in New York Supreme Court against Peter Max, and the estate of Peter Max's late wife, Mary Max. The suit alleged that Peter and Mary Max had embezzled $4,600,000 from the $11,000,000 Gottlieb trust while the trust's grantor, Louis Gottlieb, was suffering from dementia. The suit further alleged that Peter and Mary Max had squandered the ill-gotten gains on luxury goods. According to the New York Post, "They used much of the cash to splurge on bling, including a Cartier bracelet, earrings and a ring collectively worth $1.485 million; $1.3 million in jewelry from Bhagat; a Verdura ring costing $58,500; and $47,000 Van Cleef & Arpels earrings, among dozens of other pricey purchases, according to Lou's daughter, who is seeking to recoup the cash." The Gottlieb estate sought to recover a portion of the alleged ill-gotten proceeds from Peter Max following Mary Max's suicide when Peter Max attempted to liquidate the luxury goods at Doyle New York.

== Personal life ==
Max married his first wife, Elizabeth Ann Nance, in 1963, and they divorced in 1976. Max had a nine-year-long relationship with musician and model Rosie Vela that ended in 1985. He was also romantically connected with Tina Louise. Max married Mary Balkin in 1997; she died by suicide (nitrogen asphyxiation) in June 2019.

He was an environmentalist, vegan, and supporter of human and animal rights. In 2002, Max contributed to rescue efforts for Cincinnati Freedom, a cow that escaped from an Ohio slaughterhouse. The cow jumped over a six-foot fence while the slaughterhouse workers were on break and eluded capture for eleven days. Max donated $180,000 worth of his art to benefit the local Society for the Prevention of Cruelty to Animals, which led to the cow being sent to Farm Sanctuary in Watkins Glen, New York, a permanent home where she remained for the rest of her life.

Max lived in New York City and had two adult children, Adam Cosmo Max and Libra Astro Max.

=== Illness and death ===
In 2021, it was reported that Max had developed advanced dementia, largely the result of Alzheimer's disease. There was controversy concerning the guardianship Max was under. For some years his daughter had worked to revise the guardianship.

Max died from complications of dementia at a hospital in New York, on September 14, 2026, at the age of 88.

== Legacy ==
Following his death, The New York Times noted that Max's work "breathed the spirit of the 1960s". The Associated Press said that Max's psychedelic pop art "expressed the optimism of the 'flower power' movement of the 1960s". The Washington Post also highlighted that Max's work came to symbolize the 1960s.
