= Hamilton County Courthouse (Ohio) =

Local government building in the United States

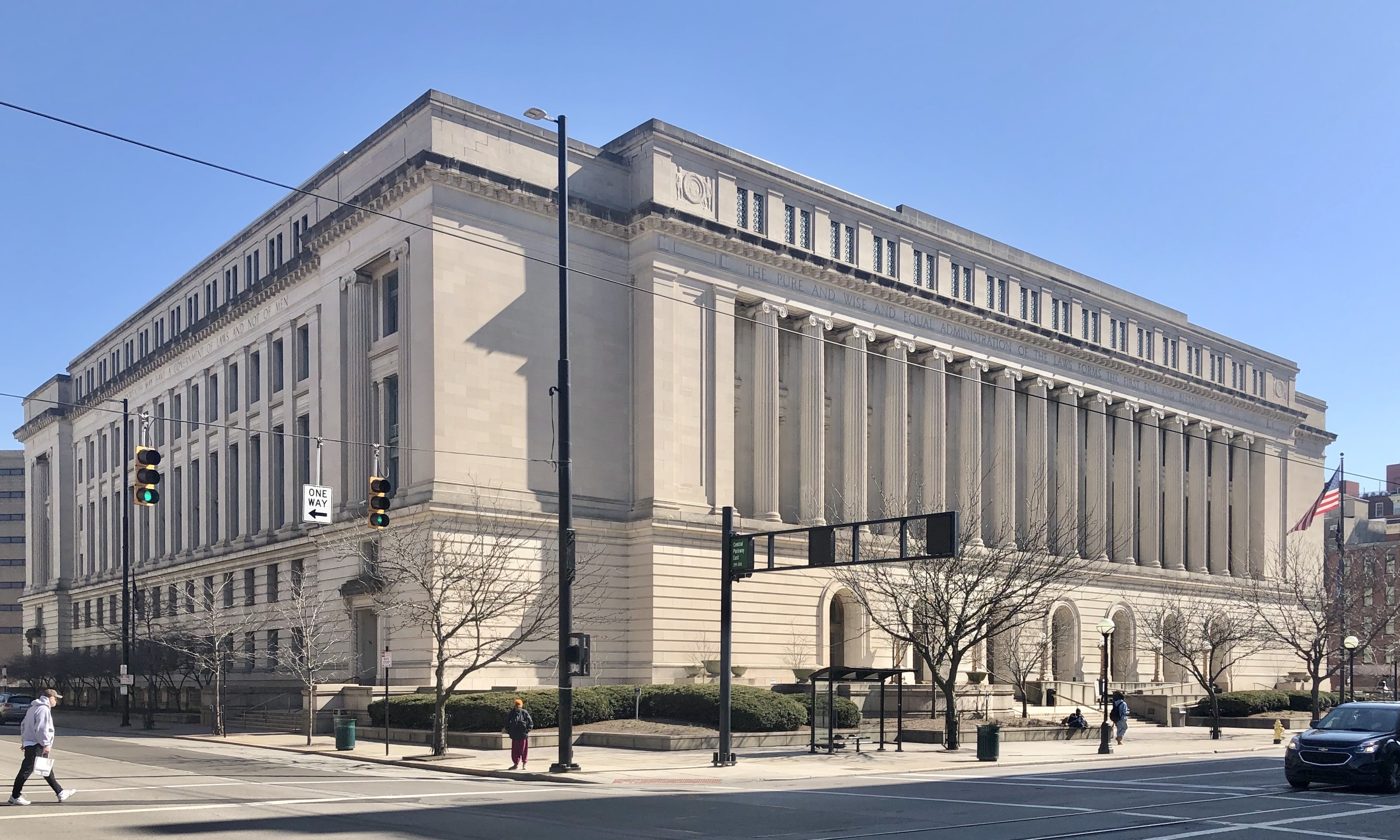
- Western front in 2020

- Location within Ohio
- Interactive map of the Hamilton County Courthouse area

General information
- Location: 1000 Main Street, Cincinnati, Ohio 45202
- Coordinates: 39°6′25.67″N 84°30′37.09″W
- Completed: 1915

The Hamilton County Courthouse is located in downtown Cincinnati, Ohio and contains the Hamilton County Common Pleas Court, the Municipal Court, Small Claims Court, and the Clerk of Courts offices.

The Hamilton County Courthouse is connected to the county jail, the Hamilton County Justice Center, via a skybridge.

== History ==
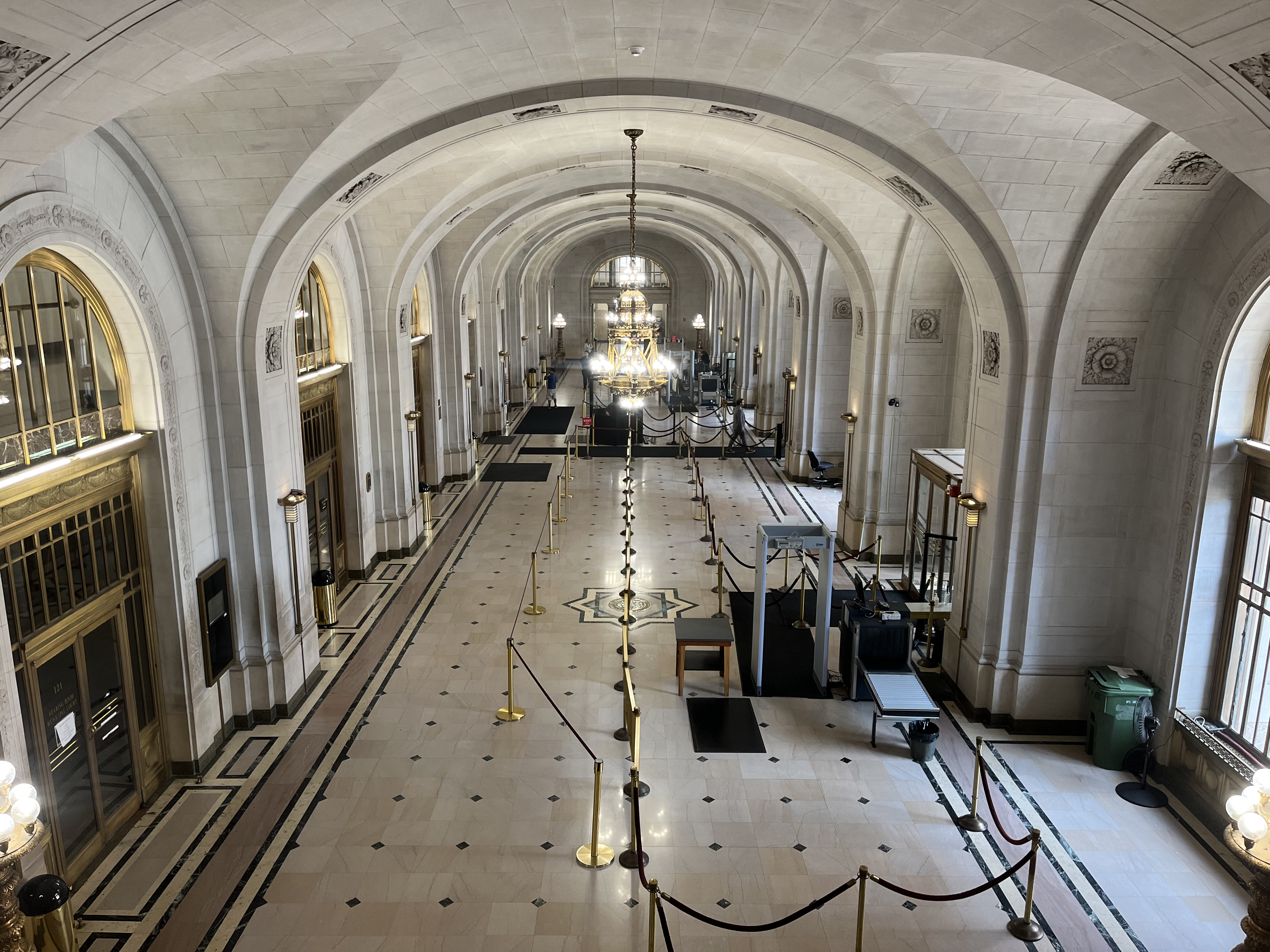
Lobby in 2023

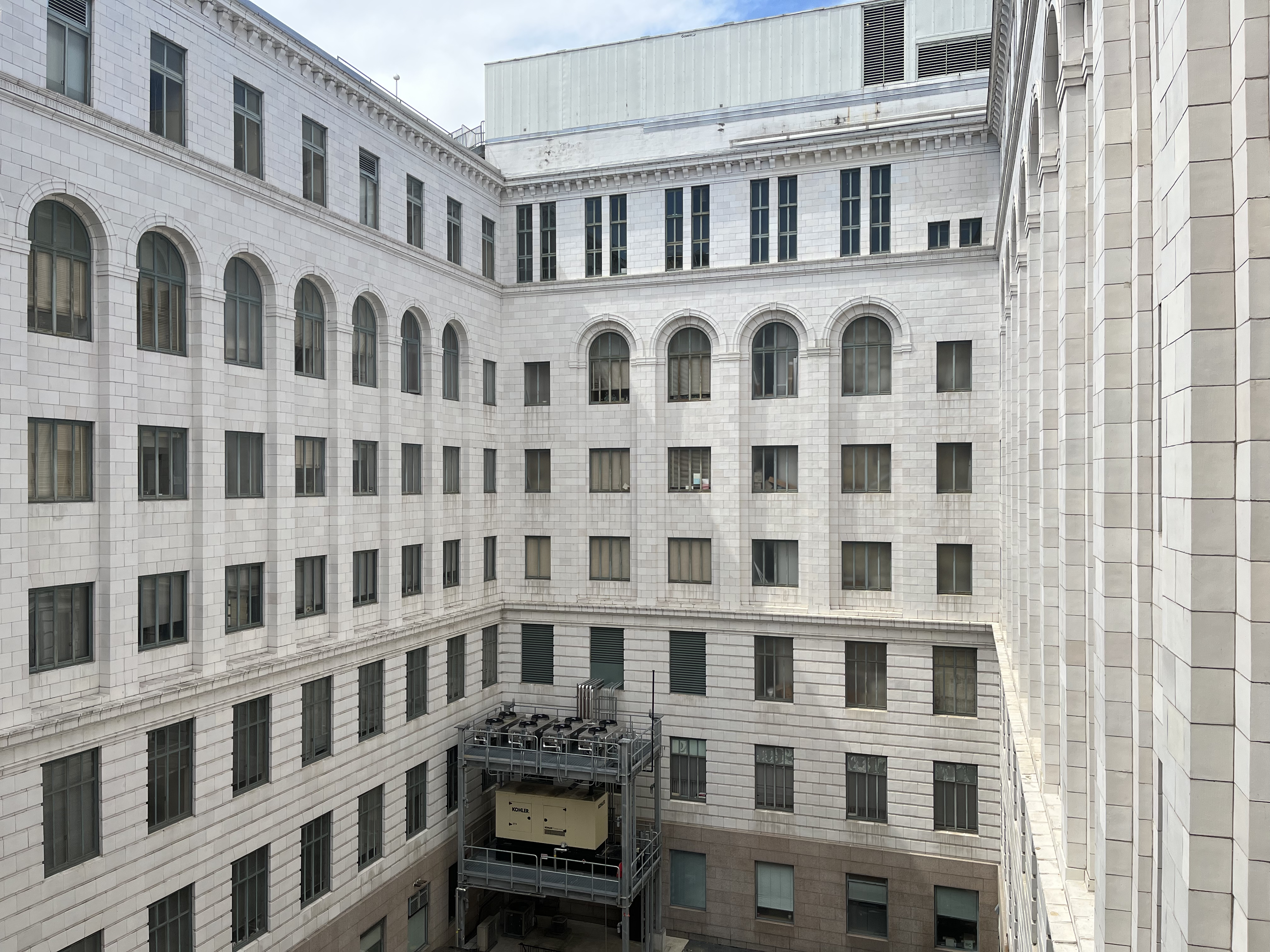
Courtyard in 2023

The present courthouse is the sixth courthouse and the fourth courthouse constructed in downtown Cincinnati. On October 1, 1915, former President and future Chief Justice of the Supreme Court of the United States, William Howard Taft laid the cornerstone. After spending the sum of $3,022,000 to construct this Renaissance Revival styled courthouse, on October 18, 1919, this courthouse was officially dedicated by then, Senator, and future President, Warren G. Harding.

Of Ohio's 88 counties, Hamilton County maintains the dubious distinction of having more courthouses succumb to fire than any other county in Ohio, three. The second courthouse was constructed in 1802 and destroyed by fire in 1813, while being used as a military barracks for soldiers during the War of 1812. The third courthouse was constructed in 1819 and, like the second one, was destroyed by fire in 1849, the result of a fire in an adjacent pork factory. In keeping with the trend, Hamilton County's fourth courthouse, built in 1854, was also destroyed by fire, a result of the Cincinnati riots of 1884.
