= Camp Washington, Cincinnati =

Coordinates: 39°8′N 84°32′W

- Neighborhood of Cincinnati
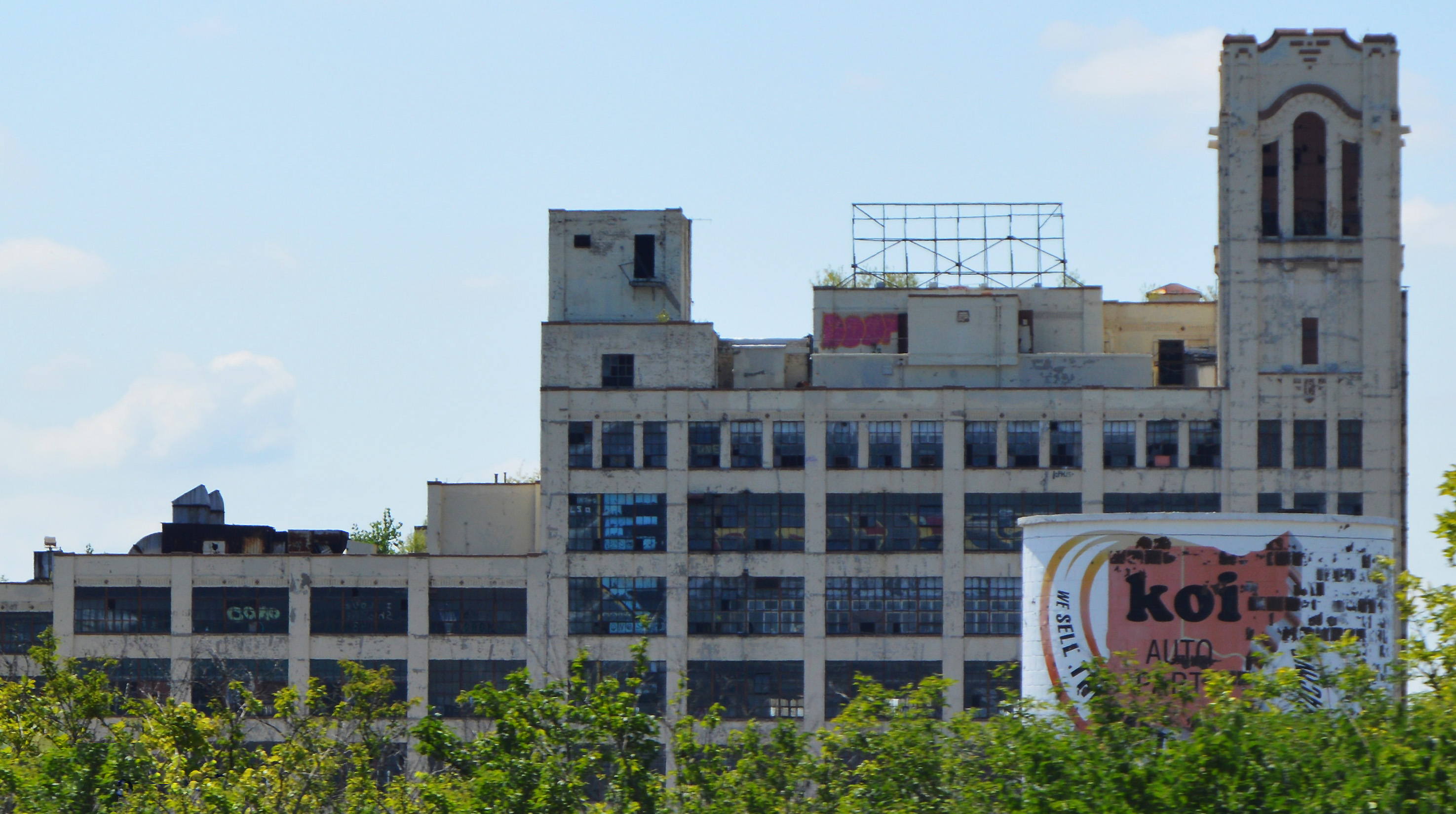
- The Crosley Building, original location of WLW studios

- Flag

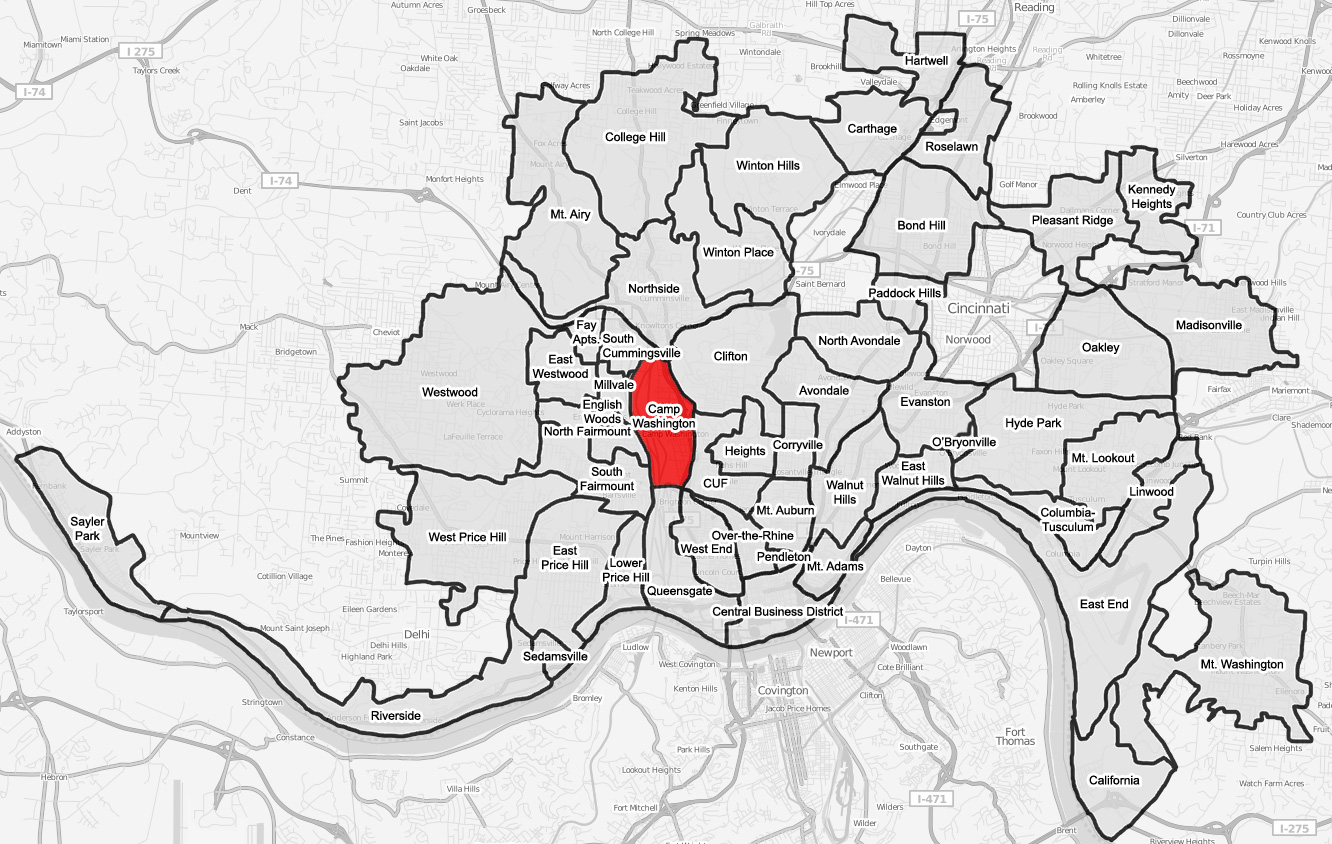
- Country: United States
- State: Ohio
- City: Cincinnati

Population (2020)
  - Total: 1,234
- Time zone: UTC-5 (EST)
  - Summer (DST): UTC-4 (EDT)

Camp Washington is one of the 52 neighborhoods of Cincinnati, Ohio. Located next to the Mill Creek, it is north of Queensgate, east of Fairmount, and west of Clifton and University Heights. The community is a crossing of 19th-century homes and industrial space The population was 1,234 at the 2020 census.

== History ==
The first Ohio State Fair was held in Camp Washington in 1850. It had been scheduled the year prior but delayed due to a severe outbreak of cholera.

During the Mexican-American War Camp Washington was an important military location, training 5,536 soldiers who went to war. Camp Washington was annexed to the City of Cincinnati in November 1869.

The neighborhood is the location of multiple National Register buildings, including the Oesterlein Machine Company-Fashion Frocks, Inc. Complex and the old Cincinnati Workhouse (designed by Samuel Hannaford), which was destroyed and rebuilt to serve as a drug rehabilitation center. The neighborhood has been home to the award-winning Cincinnati chili parlor, Camp Washington Chili for more than 70 years.

On December 29, 2002, a cow, later named Cincinnati Freedom, escaped a Camp Washington slaughterhouse and eluded capture for eleven days, drawing national attention. She was captured in the nearby neighborhood of Clifton and lived out the rest of her days at Farm Sanctuary's New York Shelter in Watkins Glen, New York. The event is memorialized in an outdoor mural on Colerain Avenue, Cincinnati, near the site of the former slaughterhouses.

Since the late 20th century, Camp Washington has transitioned from heavy industry toward a mix of manufacturing, arts, and adaptive reuse. The opening of the American Sign Museum in 2012 and the arrival of organizations like Wave Pool helped anchor new cultural activity in former factory buildings. Environmental improvements along the Mill Creek Greenway and reinvestment in historic worker housing contributed to gradual stabilization, giving the neighborhood a blended industrial‑arts identity by the 2020s.

== Demographics ==
Population of Camp Washington 1890–2020
Year	Pop.	±%
1890	10,901	—
1900	8,975	−17.7%
1910	8,682	−3.3%
1920	8,450	−2.7%
1930	9,758	+15.5%
1940	8,805	−9.8%
1950	7,890	−10.4%
1960	6,132	−22.3%
1970	3,117	−49.2%
1980	2,198	−29.5%
1990	1,763	−19.8%
2000	1,506	−14.6%
2010	1,343	−10.8%
2020	1,234	−8.1%

=== 2020 census ===
As of the census of 2020, there were 1,234 people living in the neighborhood. There were 620 housing units. The racial makeup of the neighborhood was 59.2% White, 31.8% Black or African American, 0.1% Native American, 1.7% Asian, 0.0% Pacific Islander, 1.1% from some other race, and 6.2% from two or more races. 2.7% of the population were Hispanic or Latino of any race.

There were 412 households, out of which 43.4% were families. 45.4% of all households were made up of individuals.

9.1% of the neighborhood's population were under the age of 18, 80.0% were 18 to 64, and 10.9% were 65 years of age or older. 51.9% of the population was male and 48.1% was female.

According to the U.S. Census American Community Survey, for the period 2016–2020 the estimated median annual income for a household in the neighborhood was $57,500. About 17.3% of family households were living below the poverty line. About 21.6% had a bachelor's degree or higher.
