= Oesterlein Machine Company-Fashion Frocks, Inc. Complex =

- Oesterlein Machine Company-Fashion Frocks Inc. Complex
- U.S. National Register of Historic Places
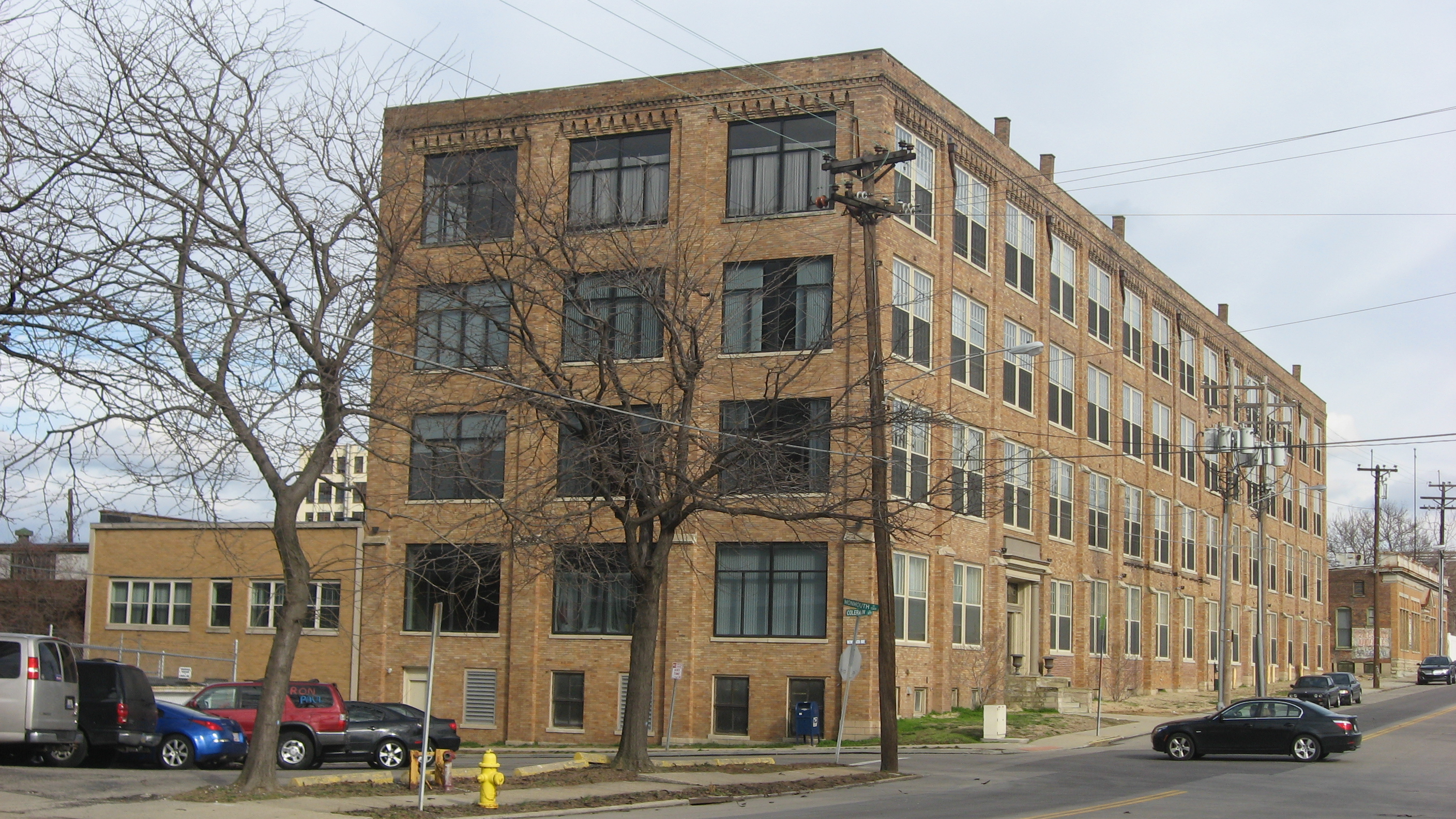
- Front and eastern side of the complex

- Location within Ohio Location within the United States
- Location: Cincinnati, Ohio
- Coordinates: 39°8′36.10″N 84°32′18.75″W
- Architectural style: Classical Revival and Early Commercial
- NRHP reference No.: 05001186
- Added to NRHP: October 27, 2005

Oesterlein Machine Company-Fashion Frocks Inc. Complex is a registered historic building in Camp Washington, Cincinnati, Ohio, listed in the National Register on October 27, 2005.

Built in 1918, the complex was originally home to the Oesterlein Machine tool plant. In the 1930s, the Fashion Frocks dress company acquired the property and manufactured women's clothing. Fashion Frocks also made parachutes during World War II. Currently, the complex is home to the American Sign Museum and loft apartments.

== Historic uses ==
- Manufacturing Facility
- Industrial Storage
