= Mary Max =

American animal rights activist (1966–2019)

- Born: Mary Balkin; October 20, 1966; Buffalo, New York, U.S.
- Died: June 9, 2019 (aged 52); New York City, New York, U.S.
- Education: Canisius College
- Occupation: Animal rights activist
- Spouse: Peter Max (m. 1997)

Mary Max (née Balkin; October 20, 1966 – June 9, 2019) was an American animal rights activist and wife of German-American pop artist Peter Max. She was a member of the board of directors of the Humane Society of the United States from 2005 until her death of apparent suicide in June 2019.

VegNews, a magazine that promotes veganism, remembered her "tireless work [as a] relentless ambassador of animal rights".

== Early life and education ==
Max was born on October 20, 1966, in Buffalo, New York, to Ruth K. Balkin. She graduated from Nardin Academy, a private college-preparatory school, and attended Canisius College.

== Animal rights activism ==
Max became active in the animal rights movement after a conversation with Italian actress Isabella Rosellini, who told her about factory farming. By her death in June 2019, Max had become a well-known figure among animal activists in New York. For years, she wrote and distributed action alert emails that encouraged her readers to contact legislators about animal-friendly bills. She also hosted various fundraisers at her husband's studio to support legislators and politicians, including New York City Mayor Bill De Blasio, and donated artwork and her personal jewelry for auctions that benefited animal rights.

In 2001, she helped organize the Farm Sanctuary's first gala and later joined the organization's advisory council.

She was a founding member of the board of directors for the New York Coalition for Healthy School Food, an organization that introduces plant-based foods and nutrition education to school communities, and joined the board of directors of the Humane Society of the United States. In 2005, Max co-founded Humane USA-PAC, a political action committee that promotes animal rights legislators in the United States. She then helped to launch Voters for Animal Rights to promote animal rights legislators in the state of New York.

In 2011, Max executive produced Vegucated, an American documentary film that explores the challenges of converting to a veganism diet.

== Personal life ==
In 1996, she met renowned painter Peter Max, and the two married in 1997. Their wedding was officiated by New York City's then-mayor Rudy Giuliani.

She died by suicide (nitrogen asphyxiation) in June 2019.

She was a vegan.

== See also ==
- Animal liberationist
- Animal liberation movement
- Peter Max
