= Prison register =

In the UK prison registers were kept from 1805 to 1892 (in London records were first kept in 1791). They list the place of birth and given name of the inmate, along with his any evidence of identity (such as distinguishing marks) and place of residence, while some also include marital status, religion and number of children.

For repeat offenders and escapees a description was added, and with juveniles, who were also housed in adult prisons, the names and address of their parents were included in the records.

A 19th century prison register is on display in the lobby of the Hamilton County Justice Center in Cincinnati, Ohio, in the United States.

== History ==
=== Early registers England and Wales ===
Until the 19th century, prisons were run locally and did not rely on the central government to run them. These prisons were generally for minor offenses and the detainment of criminals awaiting trial. The registers at this time contained minimal information such as name, offense and sentence. During the 19th century, imprisonment as a punishment became widely known and the central government became more involved with administration and ownership. Some of the earliest prisons were Millbank (1816), Parkhurst (1838), Pentonville (1842) and Portland (1846). During this time, prison administrators began keeping exceptional records of inmates to include detailed biographical information and photographs which assisted in tracing the movement of prisoners from one prison to another.

=== Classification ===
Prison registers fell into four distinct record sources; Home Office Prison Records (1770-1951, Prison Registers (Millbank, Parkhurst, Pentonville) 1847–1866, Register of Prisoners in County Prisons 1838–1875, and Millbank Prison Register 1816–1826.

==== Home Office prison records 1770–1951 ====
Large set of records and contains registers of prisoners, photographs, minute books, visitor logs, order invoices, journals, and quarter session calendars.

==== Prison registers (Millbank, Parkhurst, Pentonville) 1847–1866 ====
Besides general information these records could include prison's age, marital status, number of offspring, read or write information, trade/employment, offense, sentence, criminal record, and any prison relocation (when and where).

==== Millbank Prison Register 1816–1826 ====
This is one of the most popular registers. specific information about the prisoner was name, age, birthplace, occupation, marital status, physical details, state of health, character in prison, crime, sentence and discharge details.
