= American Sign Museum =

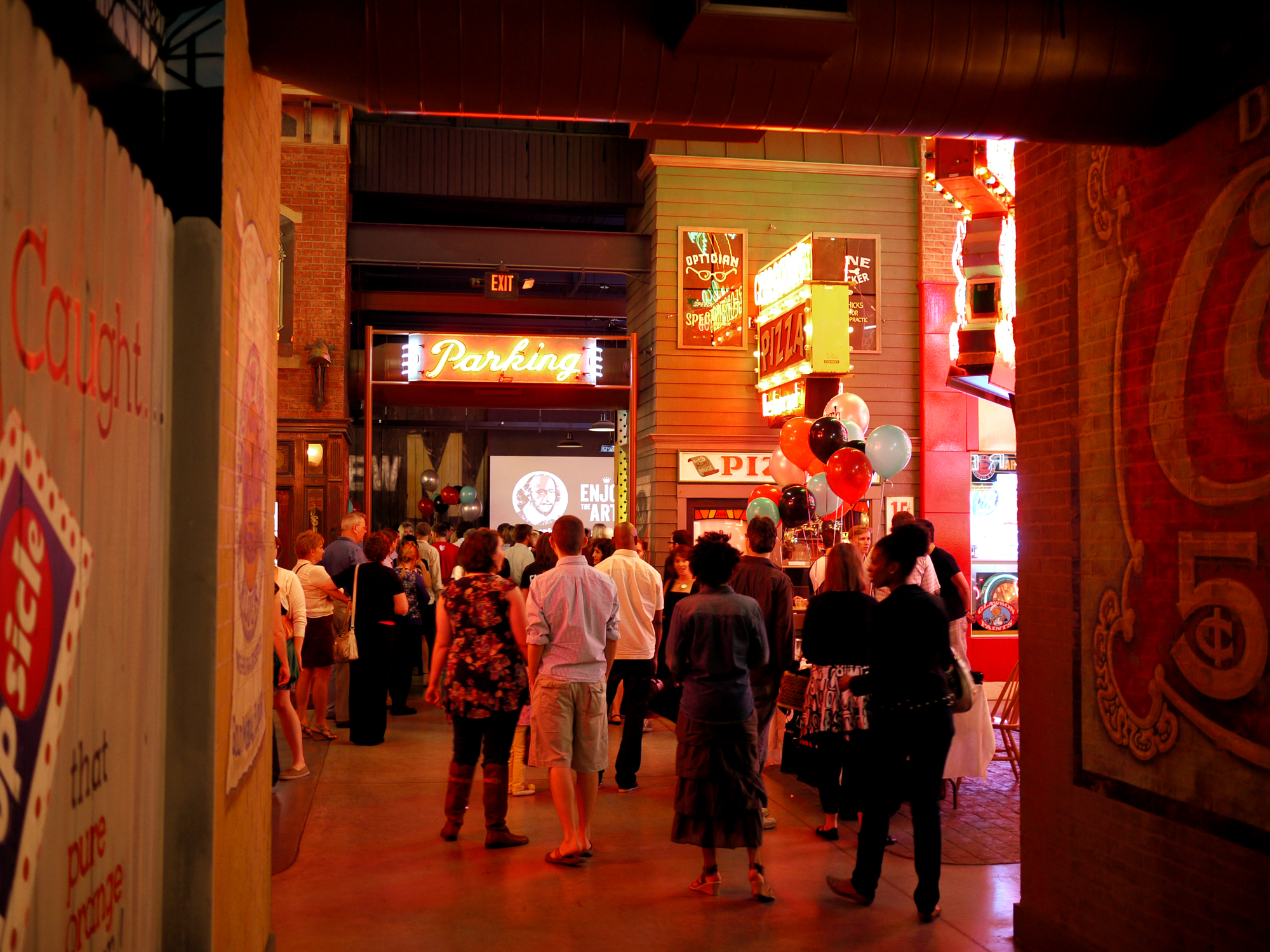

- Location within Ohio
- Established: 1999
- Location: 1330 Monmouth Street; Cincinnati, Ohio
- Coordinates: 39.1435°N 84.5399°W
- Type: Collection museum
- Founder: Tod Swormstedt
- Website: www.americansignmuseum.org

The American Sign Museum is a museum in Cincinnati, Ohio, which preserves, archives, and displays a collection of signs. The museum also displays the equipment utilized in the design and manufacture of signs. Tod Swormstedt began working on the museum in 1999, and it opened to the public in 2005.

== History ==
Swormstedt's family owns the signage industry trade journal Signs of the Times, which has been published since 1906. Swormstedt's grandfather, H.C. Menefee, was the first editor of the publication, and purchased it for himself in 1911. Swormstedt had been working at the journal for more than 20 years before becoming inspired to start a sign museum in 1999. His family provided $1 million for the project, and figures from the signage industry gave donations of their own. The museum was founded as a nonprofit corporation. Swormstedt considered building the museum in Los Angeles, St. Louis, Memphis, and other sites, but eventually settled on Cincinnati, the base of operations for Signs of the Times.

Many signs owned by the museum were too large to fit the original exhibit space. To better accommodate the collection, the museum began purchasing a 42,000-square-foot (3,900 m^{2}) property in Camp Washington, Cincinnati, in 2007. The new location is part of the Oesterlein Machine Company-Fashion Frocks, Inc. Complex, a National Register of Historic Places building. The museum opened in its new home in June 2012, and the building displays about 500 signs and artifacts, many of which are on a faux streetscape in a town called "Signville".

Neonworks of Cincinnati moved its business into the museum's new location and features a live exhibit showing visitors how they restore neon signs.

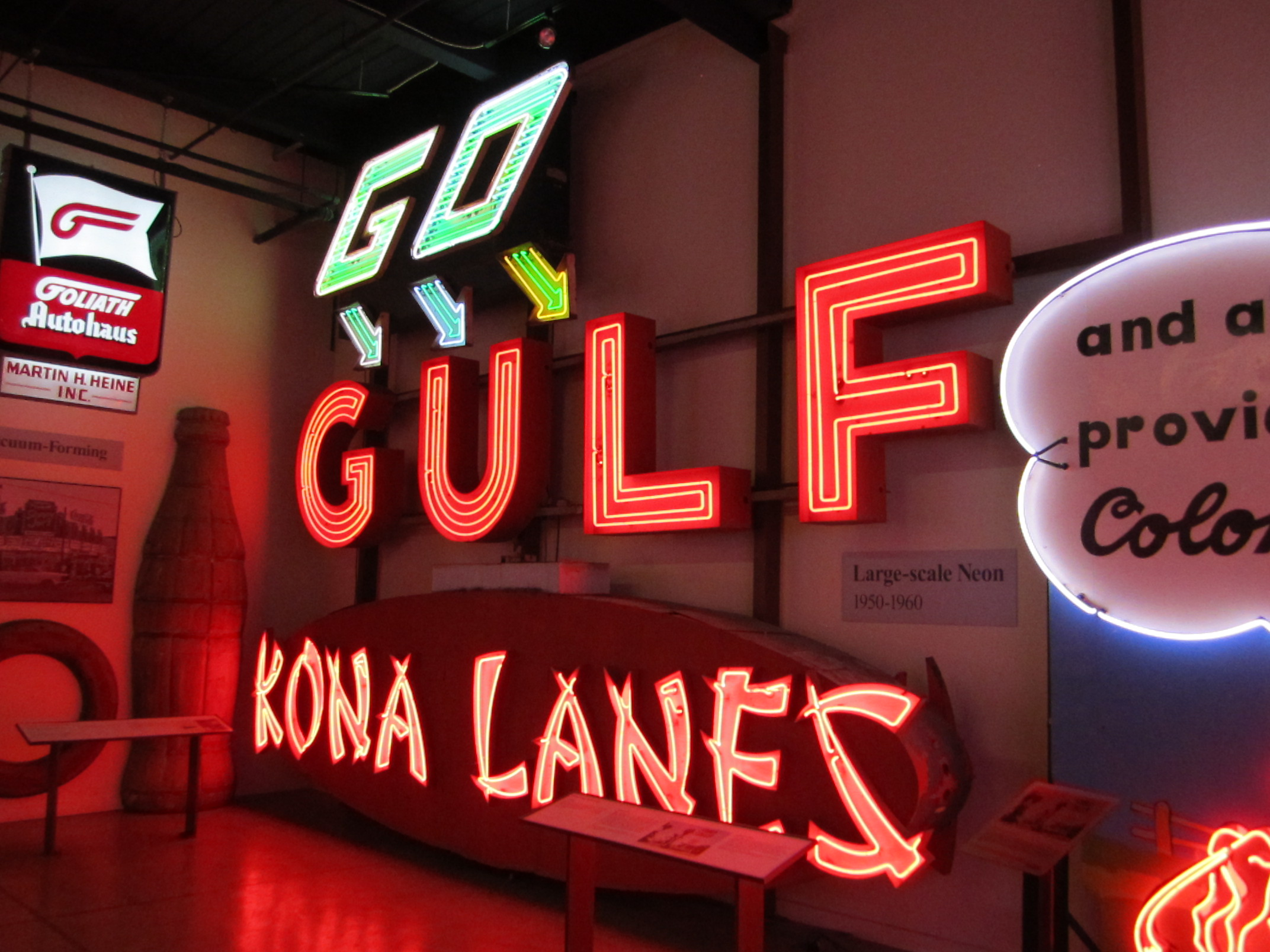
A sample of the display within the American Sign Museum in 2014 includes signs for Gulf Oil and Kona Lanes.

== Collection ==
Over 200 signs and other objects are on display at the museum, and over 3,800 items are cataloged. The collection ranges from the late nineteenth century to the 1970s. Highlights of the collection include samples of gold leaf lettering on glass, a Sputnik-like plastic orb from an Anaheim shopping center, a rotating neon windmill from a Denver donut shop, Las Vegas showcards, and a fiberglass Frisch's Big Boy statue with a slingshot in his pocket. (The slingshot was omitted from later models of the Big Boy statue.) One can also find signs from businesses such as Big Bear Stores, Howard Johnson's, and Earl Scheib. Over the museum's entrance, visitors are greeted by a 20-foot-tall (6.1 m) fiberglass genie from a Los Angeles carpet company.

In 2008, the museum acquired a single-arch 1963 McDonald's sign from Huntsville, Alabama. The sign features McDonald's Speedee character, who was phased out in favor of Ronald McDonald in the 1960s. In 2009, the museum added a neon sign from Johnny’s Big Red Grill, once a popular restaurant among Cornell University students.

== See also ==
- Neon Museum at the Fremont Street Experience in Las Vegas
