= Hamilton County Justice Center =

Coordinates: 39°06′25″N 84°30′32″W

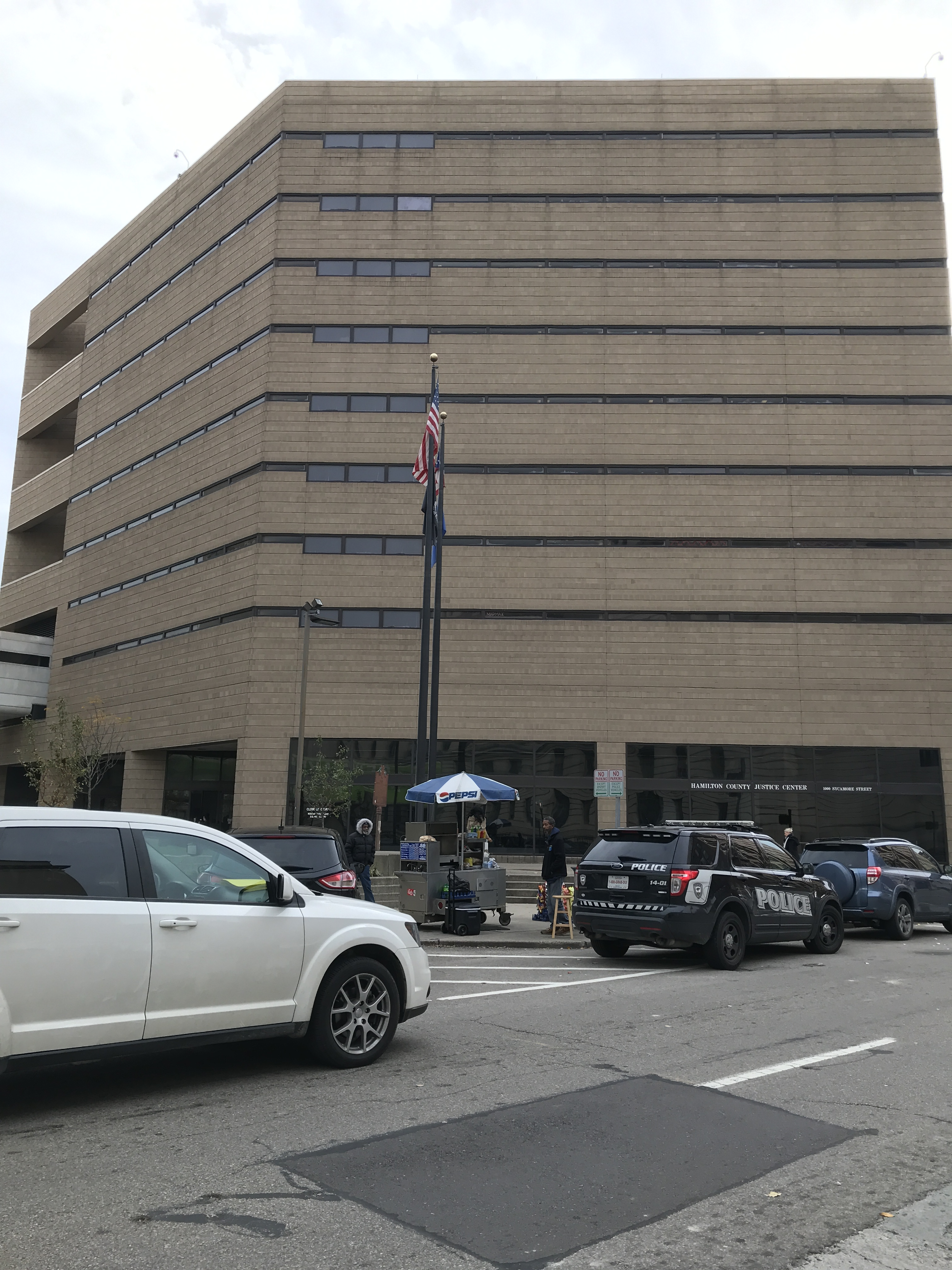
Hamilton County Justice Center in Cincinnati, OH

The Hamilton County Justice Center is the main county jail branch for Hamilton County, Ohio. It is serviced by the Hamilton County Sheriff's Office. The facility is located at 1000 Sycamore Street in the central business district of Cincinnati.

== Building ==
The Hamilton County Justice Center was built in 1985 at an expense of $54 million. The complex consists of two brutalist-style twin towers, each of which rise ten floors. The jail twin towers are connected to each other by a windowless skywalk. Direct access to the jail from the Hamilton County Courthouse (across the street) is afforded by another skywalk passing over Sycamore Street.

In 2013, the jail held an average 1424 prisoners daily, and an estimated 55,000 annually, making it one of the 25 largest jails in the U.S.

Several artifacts taken from the Cincinnati Work House and Hospital, a former 19th-century jail, are on display at the Hamilton County Justice Center.

== History ==
On May 31, 2020, an American flag was removed from the building and replaced with a "thin blue line" flag, in response to the protests to the murder of George Floyd. It was later reported that the American flag was first stolen, despite images to the contrary. The blue line flag was taken down. That same summer, many protesters arrested during the protests in violation of the city's curfew were forced to wait in the Justice Center upwards of 10 hours after their arrest, without access to restrooms, water or food. In December 2025, the city of Cincinnati and Hamilton county agreed to pay $8.2 million to protesters affected.
