= Don Rubbo =

American artist (1926–1979)

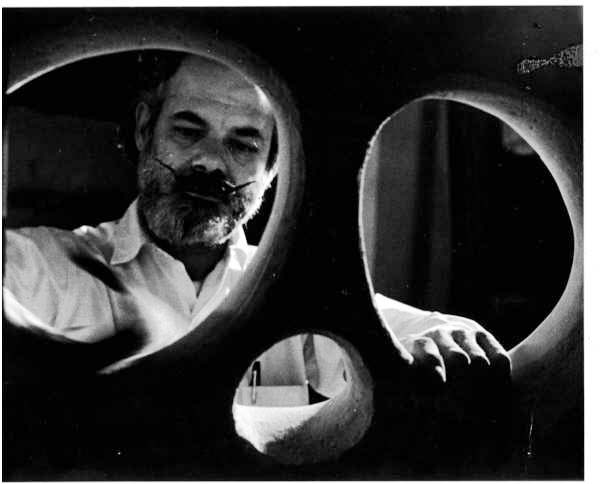
- Born: December 5, 1926; New Haven, Connecticut
- Died: January 1979 (aged 52)
- Known for: Advertising, sculpture, painting, pop art
- Website: donrubbo.com

Don Rubbo (December 5, 1926 – January 1979) was a mentor and guide of Peter Max and an affiliate of Andy Warhol in the mid-1960s. His philosophy of "life is art, art is life" inspired and influenced many of his students.

== Early life and family ==
Admondo Dondes Rubbo was born in New Haven, Connecticut. In February 1945, at the age of eighteen, he enlisted in the army where he received three medals for his service to his country.

After the war, he settled in New York City, and in 1952 he married Maria Fontanes. They had seven children, Edmund, Linda, Donald, Robert, George, Thomas and Diana. Don and Maria divorced in 1967. He then married Cathy Palermo in 1970, and they had one child, Michael.

== "Life is art, art is life" ==
In 1962 Rubbo started a small Manhattan arts studio with friend Tom Daly and Daly's friend from the Art Students League of New York, Peter Max. They named it The Daly & Max Studio. Although his name was not on the business, Rubbo played a major part and the three worked as a group on books and advertising; Rubbo was known as the ampersand in "Daly & Max". In 1963, Daly, Max and Rubbo did the illustration, design and color for Helga Sandburg's (the daughter of poet Carl Sandburg) children's book Joel and the Wild Goose.

In the mid-sixties, Rubbo was hired by Dr. Robert Jastrow, founder of the Goddard Institute for Space Studies, to draw maps for NASA. At the Goddard Institute for Space Studies, he became good friends with George Goodstadt, who later went on to found Bank Street Atelier, a lithography printing studio, and George Goodstadt, Inc.

At the advertising giant Diener, Hauser, & Greenthal, Rubbo was the creative force behind the iconic images on movie posters for The Godfather (1972), The Endless Summer (1968), A Clockwork Orange (1971), and Chitty Chitty Bang Bang (1968), among others.

Rubbo designed the distinctive font for Dove soap, which is still used today in their advertising.

In 1967 Rubbo shared a studio with Max Menikoff, designing ads and package design. The studio was located in midtown Manhattan, on the east side. In the fall of 1967 Rubbo accepted twelve students from the High School of Art and Design in an apprenticeship program. According to one of the students, Fred Gerlach (F. August Gerlach), when the group showed up at the studio for their first meeting, Rubbo said, "Hello, what a motley crew. Let me introduce myself, they call me big balls Rubbo because I have a lot of tough nuts to crack in my life."

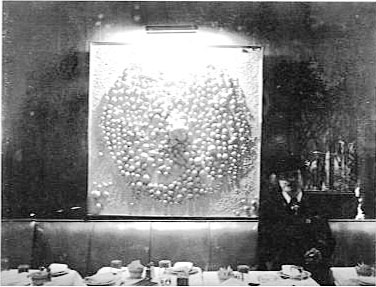
Rubbo with his sculpture at Max's Kansas City restaurant and nightclub, New York. Owner Mickey Ruskin purchased the sculpture for the restaurant.

In 1968, Rubbo moved his family into 365 Canal Street, the former Canal Street Lumber Company building, and with the help of his students and children he ripped out the lumber racks and built one of the earliest artist's lofts in New York City's SoHo district. It became the center of life for many artists and creative spirits as well as some down-on-their luck acquaintances. Rubbo presided over the large kitchen table, and fed everyone who walked in the door.

He filled this huge space with his multi-media sculptures, some of which were large styrofoam structures that he and his students and children carved, coated with clear acrylic and then painted with colors that seemed to breathe and pulsate under changing lights, creating the illusion of "living art".

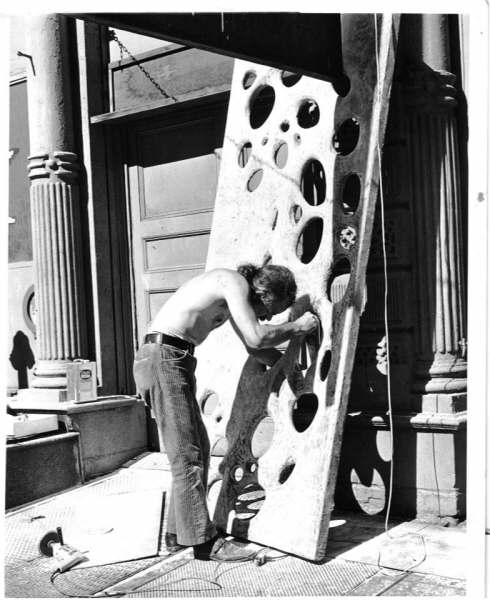
Rubbo working on a styrofoam sculpture in front of 365 Canal Street, New York, 1971

Don and his son Donald Rubbo planted one of the first community gardens in Manhattan's Lower West Side, in the weed-filled sidewalk plot next to the former Mead Paper site in Tribeca at Canal and Varick Streets. On the brick wall of the building, Rubbo created a "string painting", a spiderweb shape of string upon which morning glories grew up along the spiderweb design.

In 1973 Rubbo moved to San Juan, Puerto Rico, for several years, and taught many young Puerto Rican artists at the Centro Nacional de las Artes (National Arts Center) in old San Juan. The Centro was housed in an old building that the Franciscan priests had made available to artists to use as studios, and was run at the beginning by Carlos Irizarry.

Rubbo's students included Alex Chin (deceased), F. August Gerlach (Fred Gerlach), Carlos "Sueños" Ortiz, Peter Gaztambide, Dennis Mario Rivera, Ceferino Díaz Ruiz, Elí Barreto, Maritza Dávila, and Gloria Florit.

Rubbo suffered from heart disease, and had his first heart attack in 1968. Another heart attack in 1969 limited his ability to work, and he underwent open heart surgery in 1973. He never fully recovered his health, and he died in January 1979, aged 52.
