= Crosley Building =

Coordinates: 39°8′41.8″N 84°32′21.6″W

- U.S. National Register of Historic Places
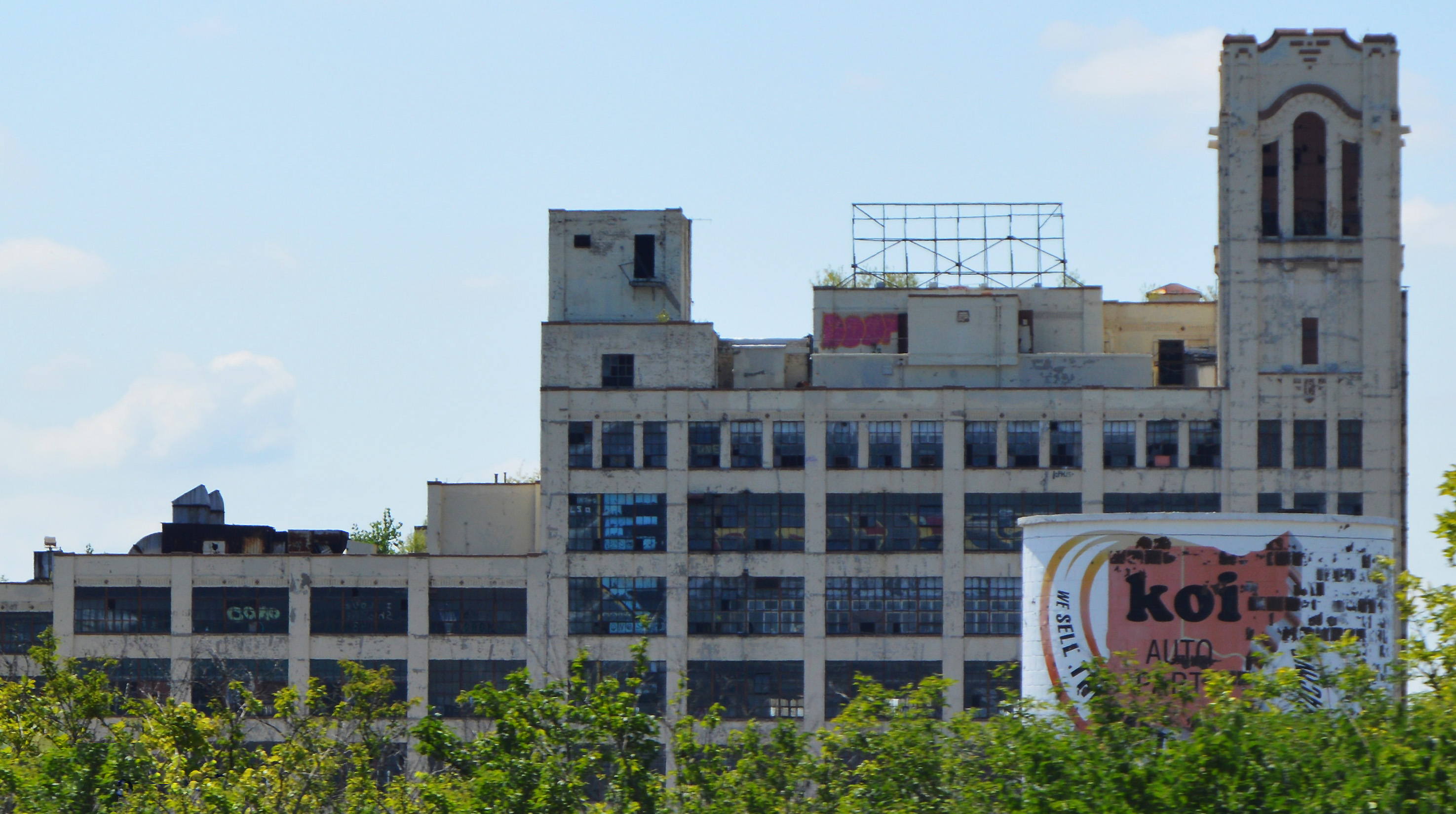

- Location within Ohio Location within the United States
- Location: 1329-1333 Arlington St., Cincinnati, Ohio
- Architect: Samuel Hannaford
- NRHP reference No.: 15000042
- Added to NRHP: February 24, 2015

The Crosley Building is a historic factory/office building in Cincinnati, Ohio. It was added to the National Register of Historic Places on February 24, 2015.

== History ==
The Crosley Building was built in 1929 by Samuel Hannaford & Sons for the Crosley Radio Corporation. The building was designed to portray a Crosley radio set, and included 330,000 square feet.

Crosley used the building to broadcast from his radio tower on the roof. Transmissions from the WLW-AM radio station could be heard from Florida to New York.

The first 7 floors were used for producing and designing cars, radios, and refrigerators. The eighth floor and tower were used for offices. The Crosley Corporation used the building until the 1940s, when it was sold to Aviation Corporation. In 1960, the factory closed down. Over the next twenty years, the building had many owners who used it as a warehouse. In 1998, the building was purchased by Hosea Project Movers. In 2006, the building was abandoned. In 2012, the building was condemned. C W Development LLC purchased the building in 2014.

== Founder ==
Powel Crosley Jr. was an American inventor and entrepreneur. He pioneered radio broadcasting, and was dubbed "The Henry Ford of Radio". His company manufactured automobiles, radios and refrigerators. Crosley was inducted into the Automotive Hall of Fame in 2010 and the National Radio Hall of Fame in 2013. He was a former owner of the Cincinnati Reds, and had a baseball field named after him.

== Sources ==
- Salerno, Ronny (2008-04-11). "Queen City Discovery: History of the Crosley Building". Queen City Discovery.
- "Back to square one: Old Crosley building is on the market again as apartment plans falter". Cincinnati.com.
