= List of parks in Cincinnati =

The City of Cincinnati parks system has five regional and 70 neighborhood parks and 34 nature preserves operated by the Cincinnati Park Board. The following is an (incomplete) list of these protected areas in Cincinnati, Ohio:

== West Side ==
- Bracken Woods
- Buttercup Valley
- Fernbank Park
- LaBoiteaux Woods
- Lincoln Park (demolished)
- McEvoy Park
- Mt. Airy Forest
- Mt. Echo Park
- Parkers Woods
- Rapid Run Park

== Central ==
- Avon Woods
- Bellevue Hill Park
- Bradford-Felter Tanglewood
- Burnet Woods
- Caldwell Preserve
- Eden Park
  - Krohn Conservatory
- Fleischmann Gardens
- Fountain Square
- Friendship Park
- Hauck Botanic Gardens
- Hopkins Park
- Inwood Park
- Jackson Hill Park
- Lytle Park
- Mt. Storm Park
- Piatt Park
- Sawyer Point
- Smale Riverfront Park
- Washington Park

== East Side ==
- Alms Park
- Annwood Park
- Ault Park
- Bettman Preserve
- California Woods
- Daniel Drake Park
- French Park
- Hyde Park Square
- Kennedy Heights Park
- Otto Armleder Memorial Park
- Owl's Nest Park
- Stanbery Park
