= Wasson Way =

Multi-use trail in Ohio, United States

Coordinates: 39.1469°N 84.4672°W

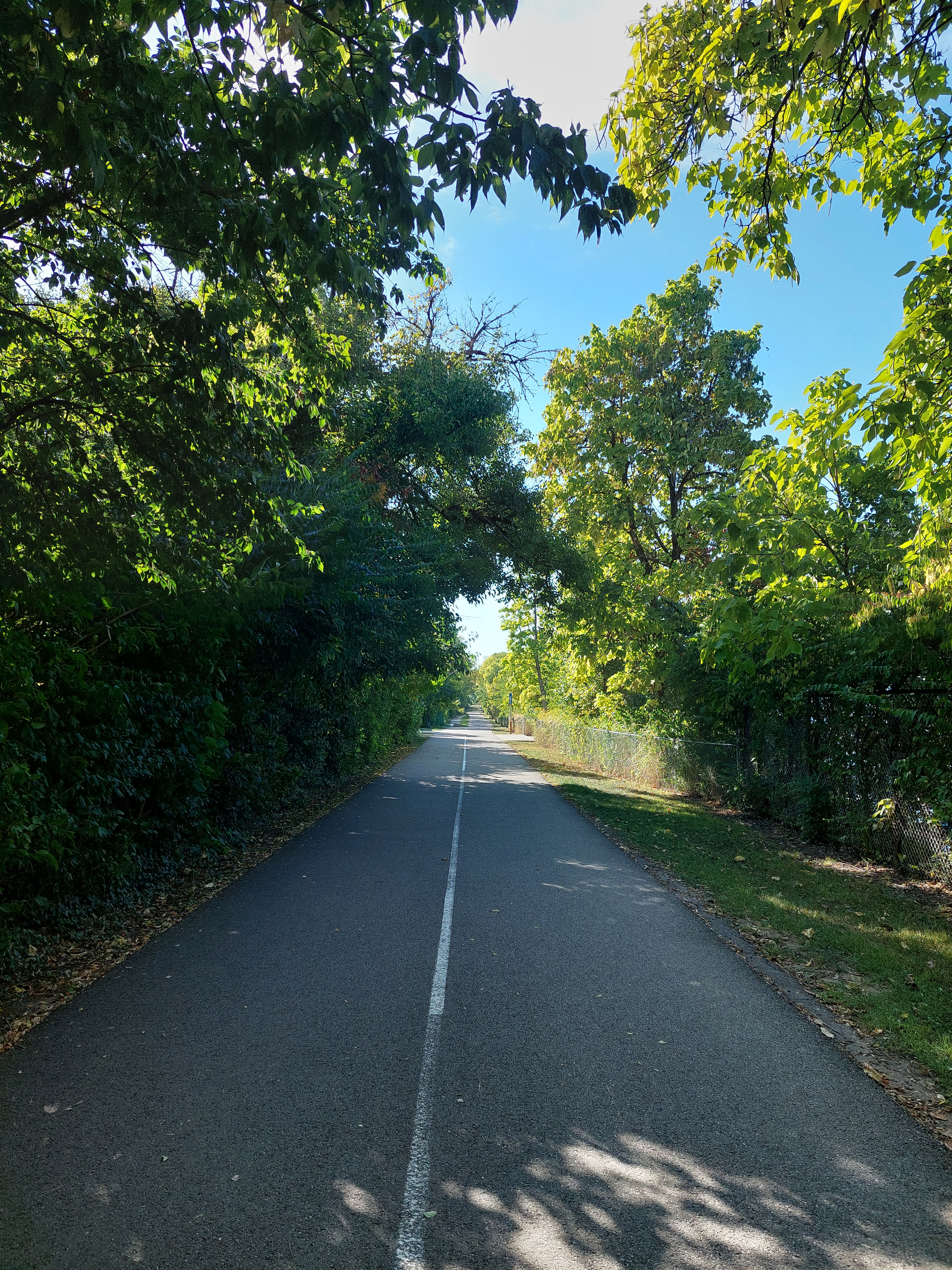
- Wasson Way near Burch Avenue
- Length: 4.55 miles (7.32 km)
- Location: Cincinnati, Ohio
- Established: 2018
- Use: Multi-use trail
- Season: All
- Sights: Xavier University; Hyde Park Square; Ault Park
- Maintainer: City of Cincinnati
- Website: wassonway.org

Wasson Way is a multi-use trail in Cincinnati, Ohio, United States. Partially complete, the trail currently runs 4.55 miles (7.32 km) in from Red Bank Road in Mount Lookout to Blair Avenue in Avondale. Two additional phases, which will connect Wasson Way to the Martin Luther King Drive path in Avondale, are in progress.

The trail is a rail trail, running almost entirely on the former right of way of the Cincinnati & Eastern and Cincinnati Northern Railroads.

The first sections of the trail opened in 2018, with subsequent phases opening almost every year between 2019 and 2023.

== Route description ==
Wasson Way runs from Red Bank Road in Fairfax to Blaire Avenue in Avondale, with intermediate sections in Mt. Lookout, Hyde Park, Oakley, and Norwood, also passing in front of Xavier University. Upcoming additions to the trail include a small connection across Dana Avenue, to be built by Xavier University, as well as a connection from the current western end of the trail at Blair Avenue to Martin Luther King Drive.

The trail is named after Wasson Road, which itself gets its name from Jacob Wasson, a farmer who owned a significant plot of land near the trail and road in the 19th century.

== History ==
Advocacy for converting the Wasson Way railroad into a recreational trail began years before construction, with the first design workshop held in 2013. The trail's creation began in 2015, when the city of Cincinnati reached an agreement with Norfolk Southern Railway to purchase a section of the Wasson Way corridor for $11.8 million. This followed advocacy by a volunteer group to convert the freight rail line to a trail, although commuter rail advocates attempted unsuccessfully to lobby the city to preserve the tracks for future transit use. The purchase by the city was finalized in September 2016, with a previously awarded state grant providing funds to construct the first phase of the trail. The initial segment of the route, which ran from Tamarack Avenune to Madison Road in Rookwood, opened in June 2018.

Phase 5 of the trail opened in December 2021, which carried Wasson Way across a former railroad bridge in Ault Park to Old Red Bank Road.

Phase 6A of Wasson Way broke ground in June 2023, which extended the trail through Evanston into Avondale.

In May 2026, the City secured a $4.1 million federal grant for the seventh phase of Wasson Way, planned to be the last.

== See also ==
- List of parks in Cincinnati
