= Big Joe (bell) =

Coordinates: 39°7′47.96″N 84°28′35.56″W

Specifications
Weight:	37,000 lb (16,818 kg)
Diameter:	9 feet (2.7 m)
Material:	Bronze
Yoke:	unknown pounds (unknown kg)
Clapper:	640 pounds
Location:	Cincinnati, Ohio, United States
Casting Date:	1895
Musical note:	E♭

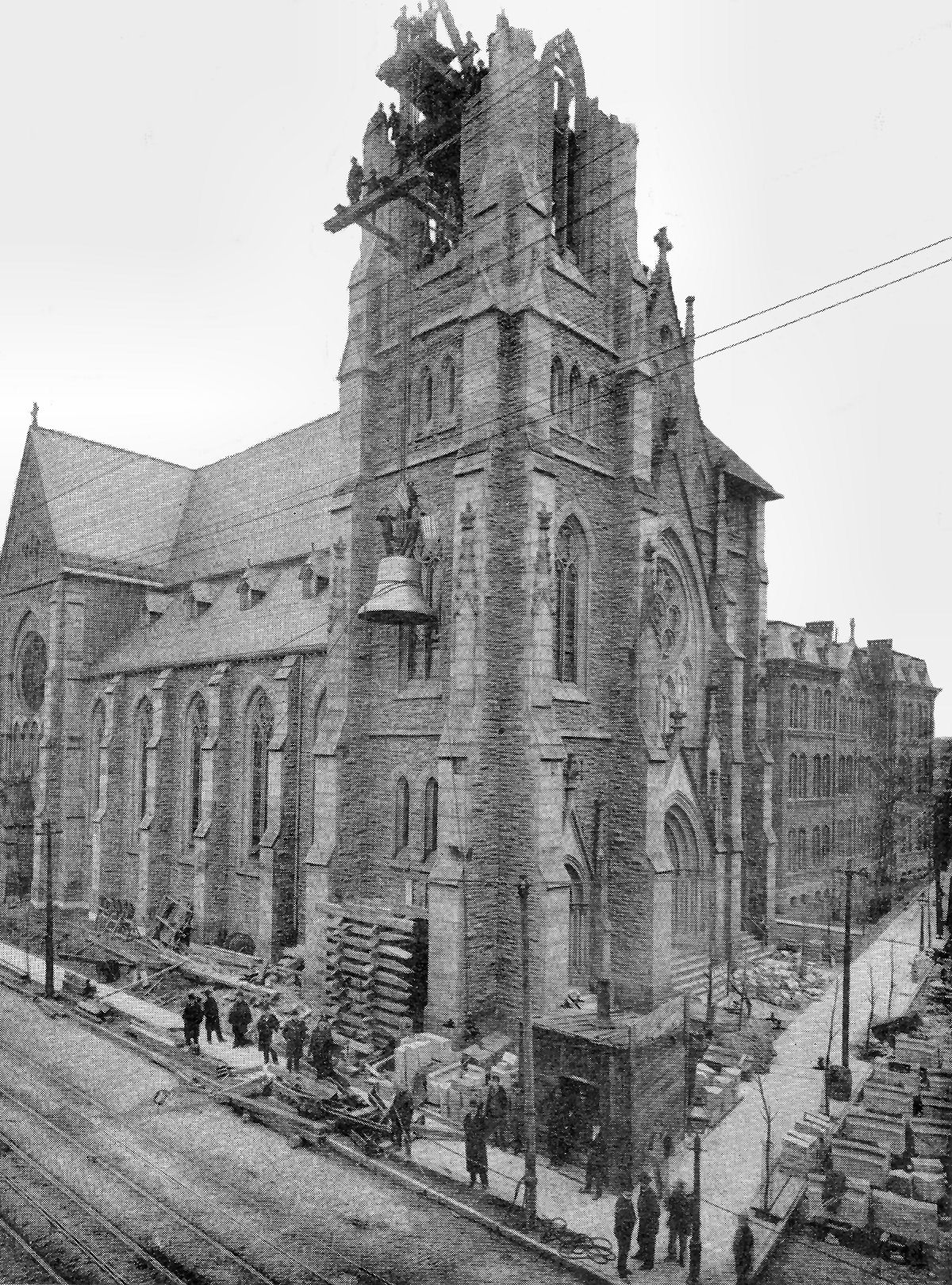
Raising of Big Joe, 1895

Joseph (commonly known as Big Joe) is a bronze bell that hangs 125 feet (38 m) into the bell tower of Neo-Gothic Saint Francis De Sales Catholic Church in Cincinnati, Ohio, United States. The endearing moniker Big Joe is a combination of the names of Joseph T. Buddeke, the largest donor of the project, and Big Ben, the great bell in the iconic Palace of Westminster clock tower in London.

Measuring 7 feet (2.1 m) tall and with a diameter of 9 feet (2.7 m), the 17.5 ton bell is the largest swinging bell ever cast in the United States. It was cast on October 30, 1895 by the E. W. Van Duzen Company at their foundry on Second Street and Broadway. The massive bell was hauled by 12 horses up Gilbert Avenue, then down Madison Road to St. Francis de Sales in the neighborhood of East Walnut Hills.

When first swung in January 1896, its deafening peal startled the Walnut Hills neighborhood and could be heard for 15 miles (24 km). According to some accounts, the resultant E♭ produced vibrations which shook the houses and buildings below and shattered nearby windows. However, a modern-day bell expert at Cincinnati-based The Verdin Company, foundry of the nearby and even larger World Peace Bell (which was cast in France), dismisses damage to window glass inflicted by Big Joe as a local legend with no historical basis. According to them, Big Joe was never swung again because of trembling in the bell tower and crumbing of mortar; the bell was simply too big for its tower.

Following the bell's inaugural ring, the parish priests decreed the bell shall "remain immobile forever". The 640-pound (290 kg) clapper was not used again; today the bell is rung only with an oversized foot hammer tapping its rim.

Big Joe is struck thrice daily at 6 am, 12 noon and 6 pm for Angelus, followed by the chiming of four smaller bells, known as the "ladies in waiting", resting above it.

== See also ==
- St. Petersglocke
