= Alms (disambiguation) =

Alms are money, food, or other material goods donated to people living in poverty.

Alms or ALMS may also refer to:

== People ==
- James Alms (1728–1791), Royal Navy officer
- Paige Alms (born 1988), Hawaiian surfer
- Frederick H. Alms, namesake of the Cincinnati park Alms Park

== Places ==
- Alms Park, Cincinnati, Ohio, United States

== Music ==
- Alms (album), an album by Re:
- "Alms", a song by The Futureheads from their album The Futureheads

== Racing ==
- American Le Mans Series
- Asian Le Mans Series

== Other uses ==
- ALMS Conference, an international LGBT library and archives conference

== See also ==
- Alm (disambiguation)
- ALMS1, a gene and protein
