= Madison and Woodburn Historic District =

Historic district in Ohio, United States

- U.S. National Register of Historic Places
- U.S. Historic district
- Cincinnati Local Historic Landmark
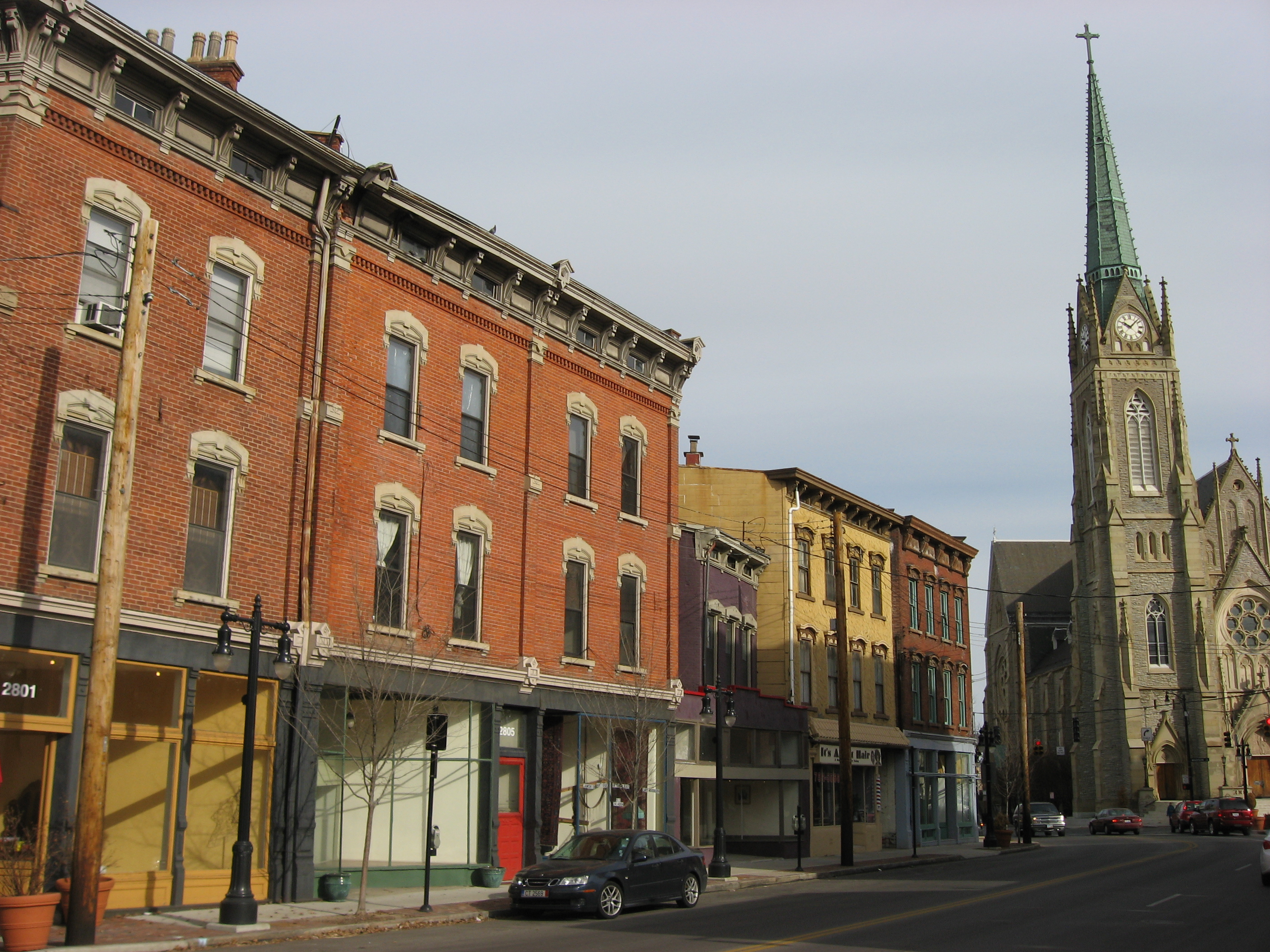
- Buildings in the district

- Location within Ohio Location within the United States
- Location: Woodburn Ave. and Madison Rd., Cincinnati, Ohio
- Coordinates: 39°7′45″N 84°28′36″W
- Area: 60 acres (240,000 m^{2})
- Built: 1875
- Architectural style: Italianate, Queen Anne
- NRHP reference No.: 83001983
- Added to NRHP: June 30, 1983

Madison and Woodburn Historic District is a registered historic district in Cincinnati, Ohio, listed in the National Register of Historic Places on June 30, 1983. It contains 19 contributing buildings.

Most of the historic architecture dates from the period 1880 to 1910, when the East Walnut Hills neighborhood was booming as a streetcar suburb.

The historic district is centered on the imposing neo-gothic Saint Francis De Sales Catholic Church at the intersection of Madison Road and Woodburn Avenue. This intersection and the business district along Woodburn Avenue are known locally as DeSales Corner.
