= Owl's Nest (disambiguation) =

Owl's Nest is a historic house in Lake George, New York.

Owl's Nest may also refer to:

- Owl's Nest Country Place, a country club in Greenville, Delaware
- Owl's Nest Park, a city park in Cincinnati, Ohio
