= Bracken Woods =

Coordinates: 39°10′11″N 84°34′20″W

Bracken Woods is a city park in the Westwood neighborhood of Cincinnati, Ohio, owned and operated by the Cincinnati Park Board. Established in 1975, the park is located on 30.23 acres (122,300 m^{2}; 12.23 ha) of land, and is also home to the Robert J. Brodbeck Nature Preserve.
