= Westwood, Cincinnati =

Coordinates: 39°08′46″N 84°35′22″W

Westwood
- Neighborhood of Cincinnati
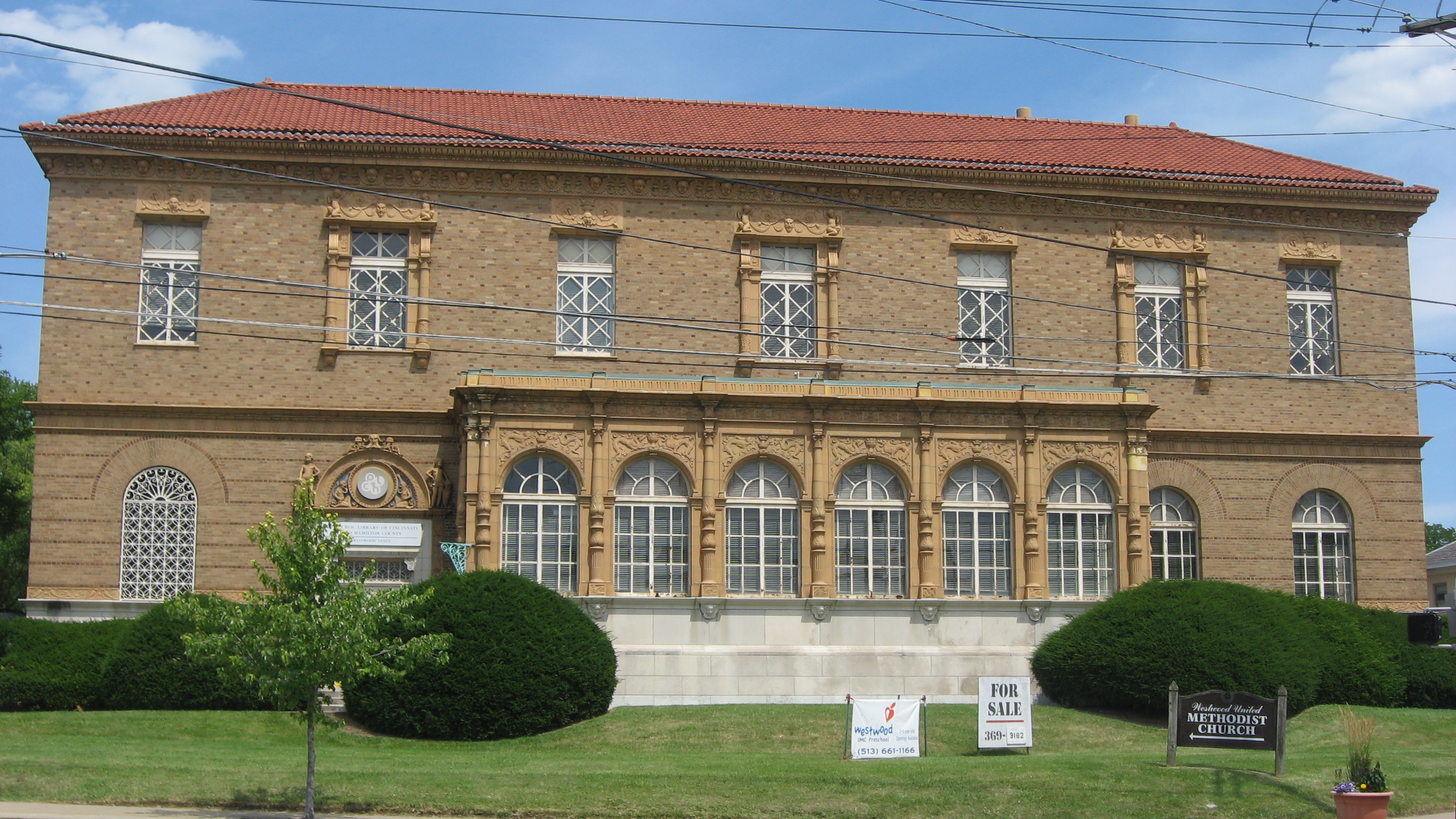
- Westwood's community center

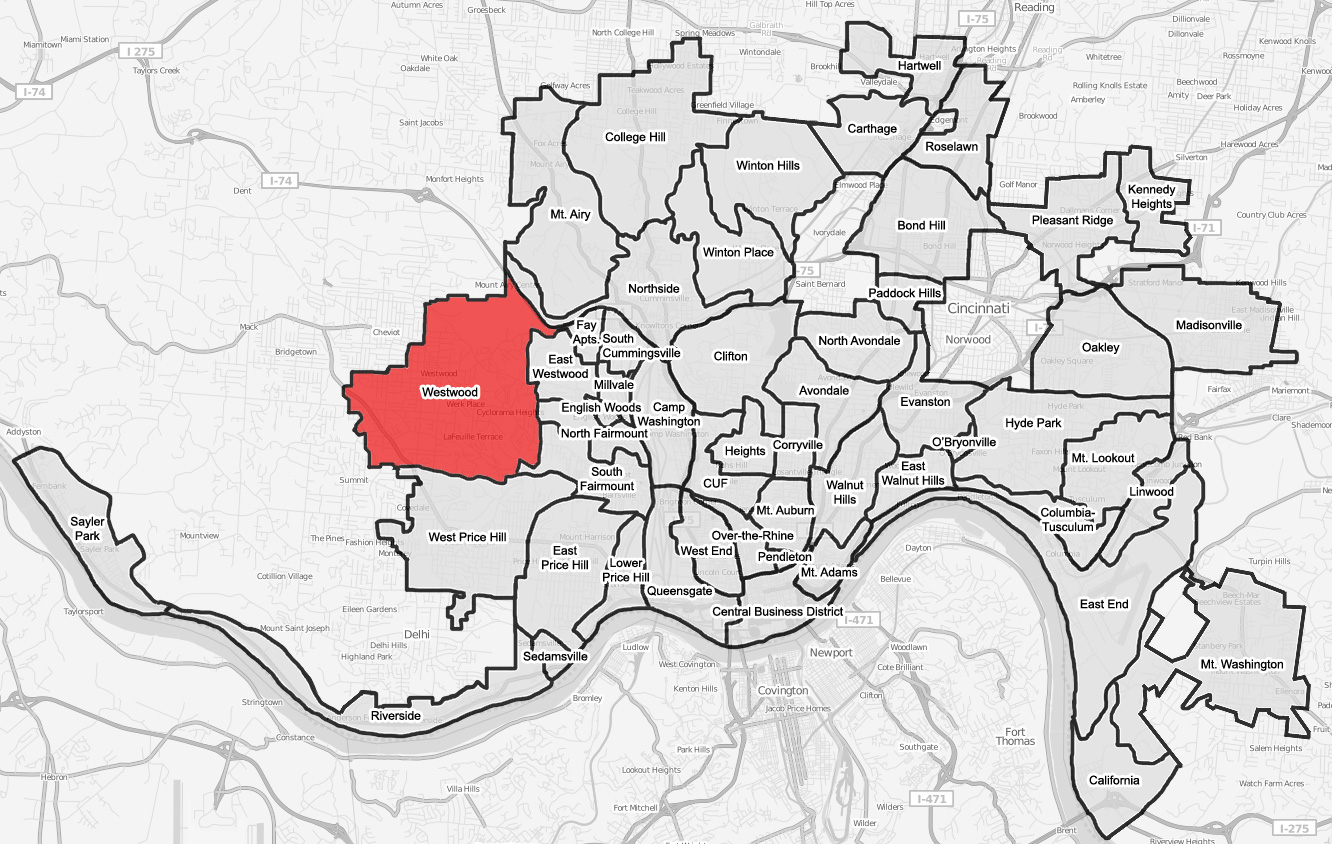
- Westwood (red) within Cincinnati, Ohio.
- Country: United States
- State: Ohio
- County: Hamilton
- City: Cincinnati

Population (2020)
  - Total: 33,774

Westwood is one of the 52 neighborhoods of Cincinnati, Ohio. Annexed in 1896 and located in the western part of the city, it is the city's largest neighborhood in both area and population. The population was 33,774 at the 2020 census.

== History ==
Westwood was incorporated as a village on 14 September 1868. It was annexed by the City of Cincinnati on 8 May 1896.

In the late 19th and early 20th centuries, Westwood's rural environment attracted many wealthy individuals, such as Procter & Gamble co-founder James Gamble. The neighborhood declined economically following World War II as poorer individuals moved into Westwood and wealthier residents moved to the suburbs.

=== Historic sites ===
Westwood contains the Westwood Town Center Historic District.

== Geography ==
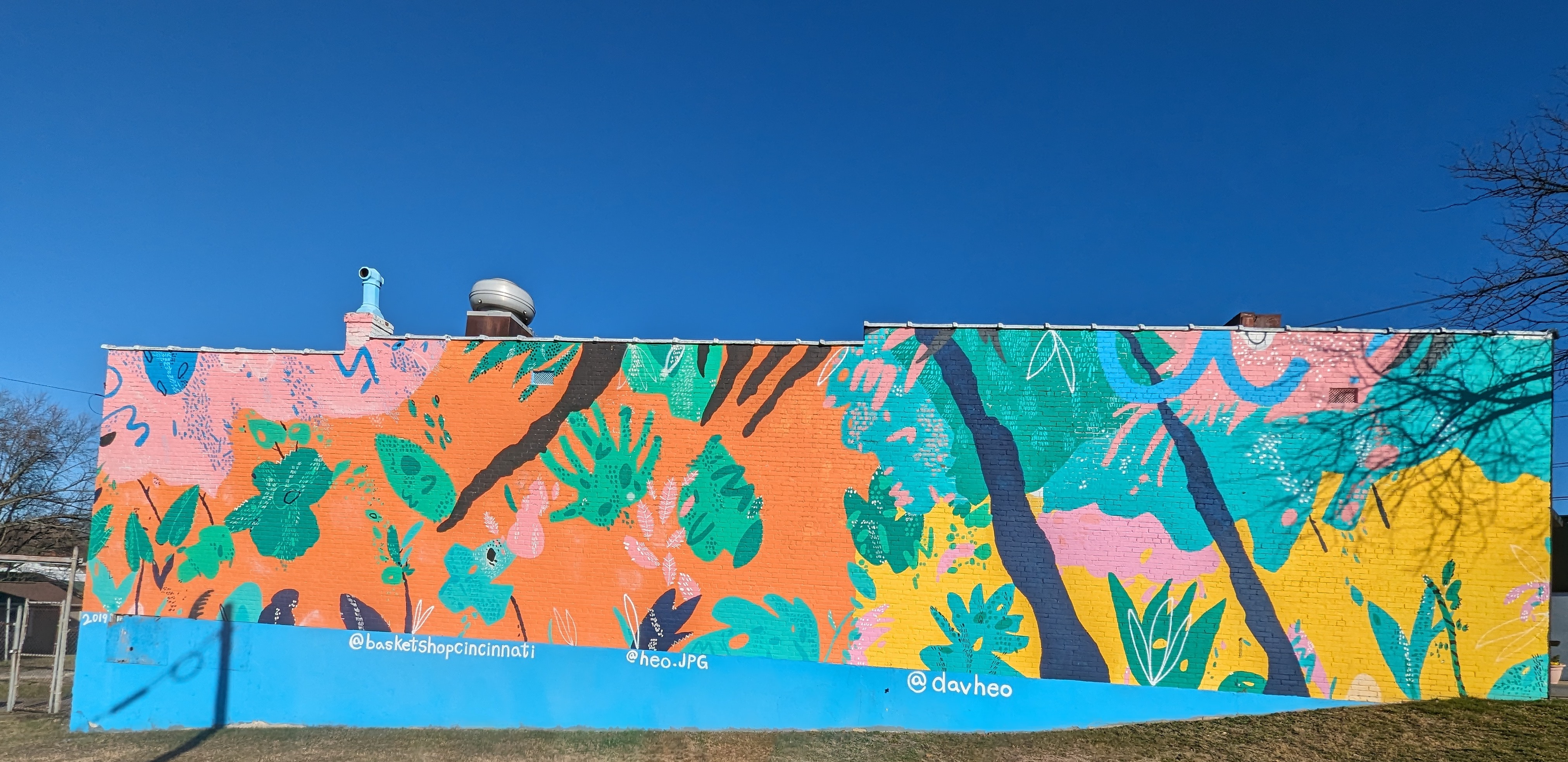
Mural off Harrison Avenue in Westwood.

It is located north of Price Hill, west of Fairmount, and southwest of Mount Airy. The city of Cheviot is adjacent to Westwood's western border.

== Demographics ==
Population of Westwood 1880-2020
Year	Pop.	±%
1880	852	—
1890	1,050	+23.2%
1900	1,651	+57.2%
1910	3,032	+83.6%
1920	5,000	+64.9%
1930	9,165	+83.3%
1940	10,976	+19.8%
1950	16,486	+50.2%
1960	22,474	+36.3%
1970	28,803	+28.2%
1980	33,580	+16.6%
1990	36,034	+7.3%
2000	35,730	−0.8%
2010	29,950	−16.2%
2020	33,774	+12.8%

As of the census of 2020, there were 33,774 people living in the neighborhood. There were 16,456 housing units. The racial makeup of the neighborhood was 36.3% White, 53.1% Black or African American, 0.3% Native American, 1.2% Asian, 0.0% Pacific Islander, 3.8% from some other race, and 5.3% from two or more races. 5.3% of the population were Hispanic or Latino of any race.

There were 14,435 households, out of which 48.1% were families. About 44.0% of all households were made up of individuals.

27.2% of the neighborhood's population were under the age of 18, 63.4% were 18 to 64, and 9.4% were 65 years of age or older. 48.3% of the population were male and 51.7% were female.

According to the U.S. Census American Community Survey, for the period 2016-2020 the estimated median annual income for a household in the neighborhood was $36,546. About 18.7% of family households were living below the poverty line. About 23.9% of adults had a bachelor's degree or higher.

== Parks ==
Bracken Woods is an urban park in Westwood containing a nature preserve.

== Notable people ==
- Steve Chabot, U.S. Congressman (1995–2009, 2011–2022)
- James Gamble, Industrialist
- James Michael Lafferty, US Business Leader and Olympic Track and Field coach.
