= Jackson Hill Park =

Park in Hamilton County, Ohio, United States

Coordinates: 39.119°N 84.514°W

Jackson Hill Park is a Cincinnati park located in the neighborhood of Mt. Auburn, purchased by the city in 1930. The park is owned and operated by the Cincinnati Park Board. In 1983 the park received new landscaping and facilities, including a picnic shelter.
