= Eden Park (Cincinnati) =

Public park in Cincinnati, Ohio

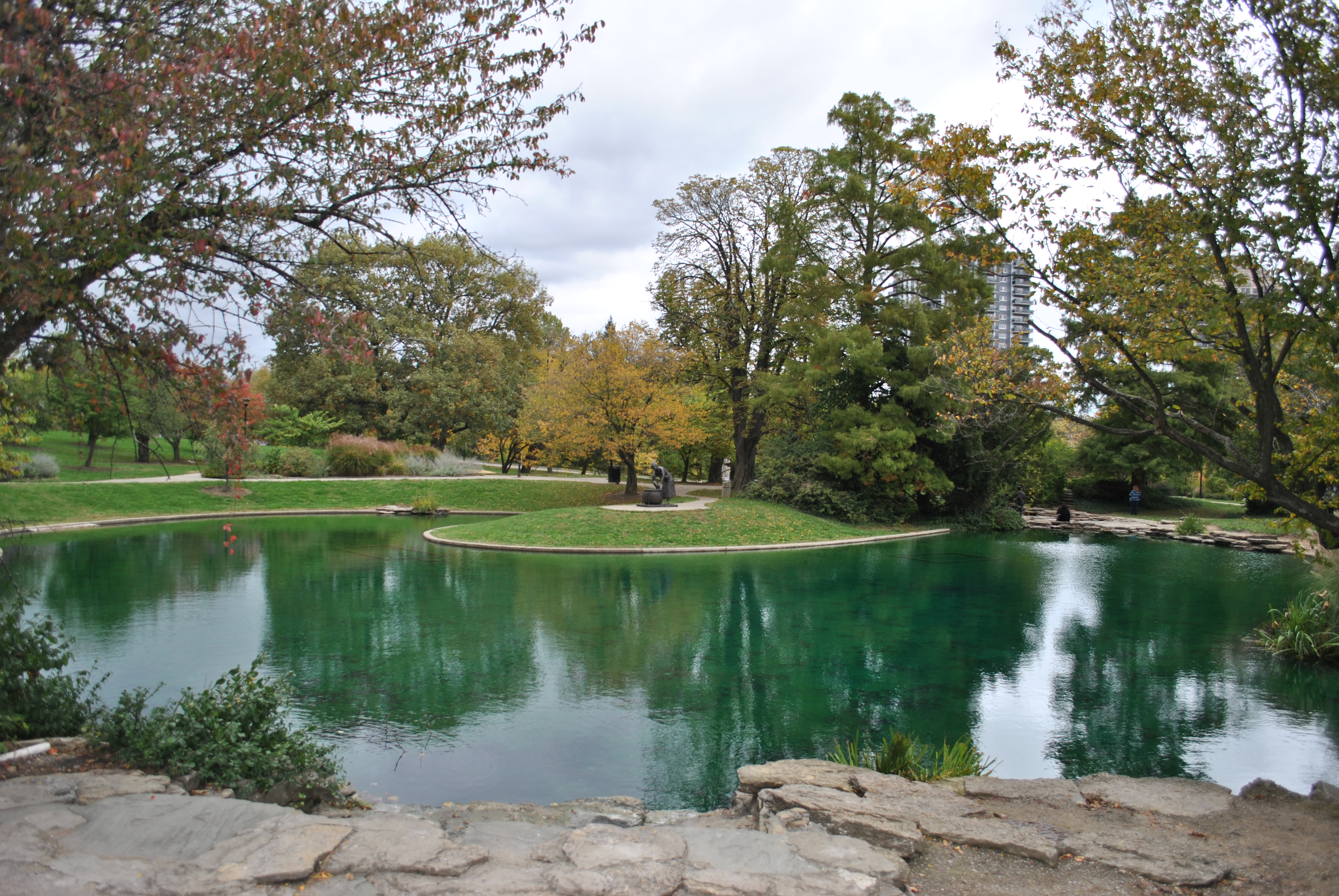
- Twin Lakes in Eden Park
- Interactive map of Eden Park
- Type: Urban park
- Location: Walnut Hills, Cincinnati, Ohio, United States
- Coordinates: 39°7′0″N 84°29′30″W
- Area: 186 acres (0.75 km^{2})
- Owner: Cincinnati Park Board
- Open: 6:00 a.m. to 10:00 p.m.
- Public transit: Metro

Eden Park is an urban park located in the Walnut Hills neighborhood of Cincinnati, Ohio. The hilltop park occupies 186 acres (0.75 km^{2}), and offers numerous overlooks of the Ohio River valley.

== History ==
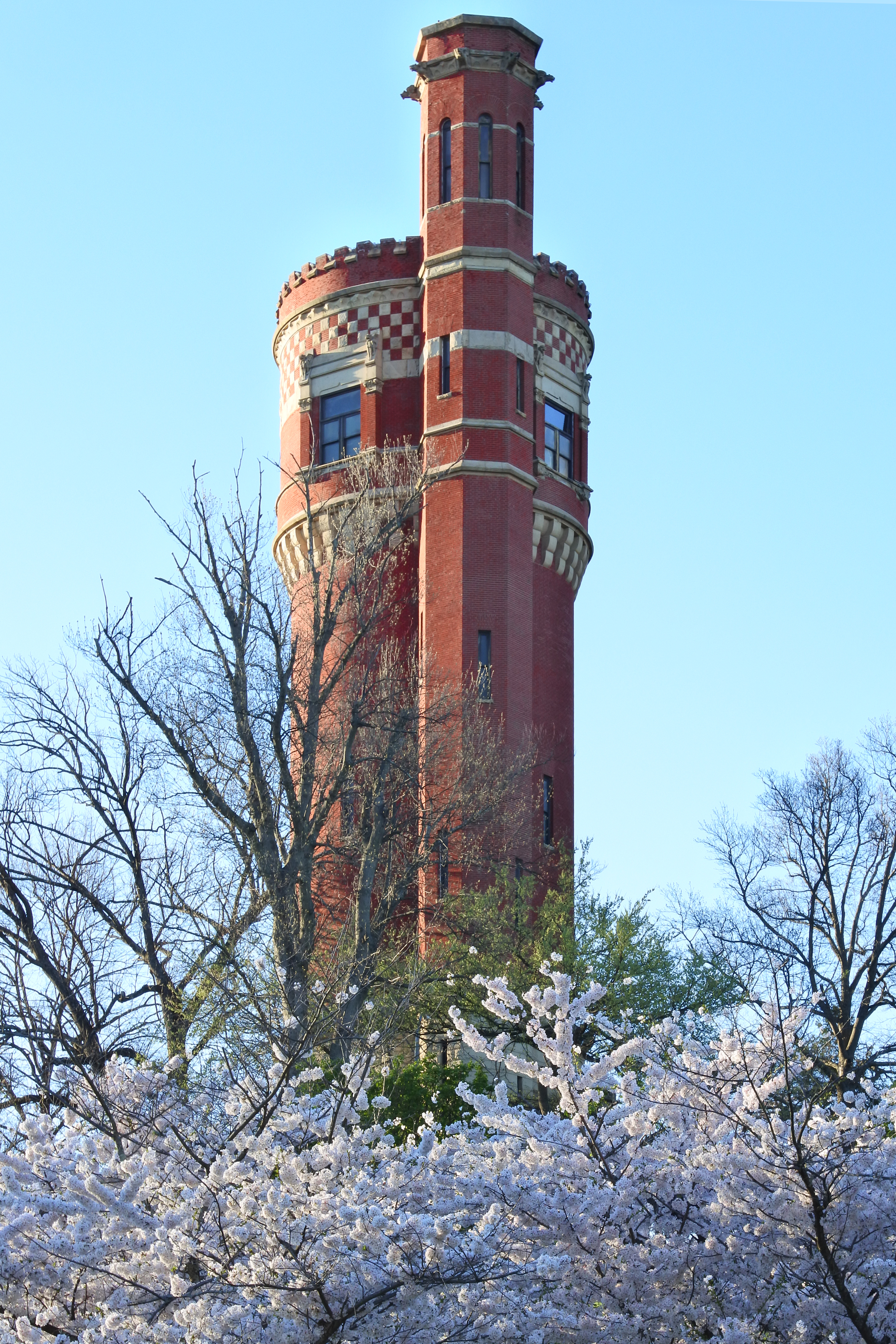
The Eden Park Stand Pipe

The park's acreage was purchased by the city in 1869 from Joseph Longworth (1813–1883), son of Nicholas Longworth, a prominent Cincinnati landowner and horticulturist, who had previously used it as a vineyard. Longworth called his scenic estate the "Garden of Eden," after the biblical Garden of Eden, and the name was partially retained for the park. The park area was originally designed by noted landscape architect Adolph Strauch, who also was responsible for Spring Grove Cemetery.

The city constructed a 12 acres (4.9 ha), 96 million gallon reservoir between 1866 and 1878. The Eden Park Station No. 7 pumped water from the Ohio River into the reservoir and then into the Eden Park Stand Pipe. The reservoir was removed in the early 1960s and the site redeveloped into the Mirror Lake reflecting pool and baseball fields. The former reservoir's dam, Eden Park Station No. 7, and Eden Park Stand Pipe still stand as historical remnants.

== Architecture and institutions ==
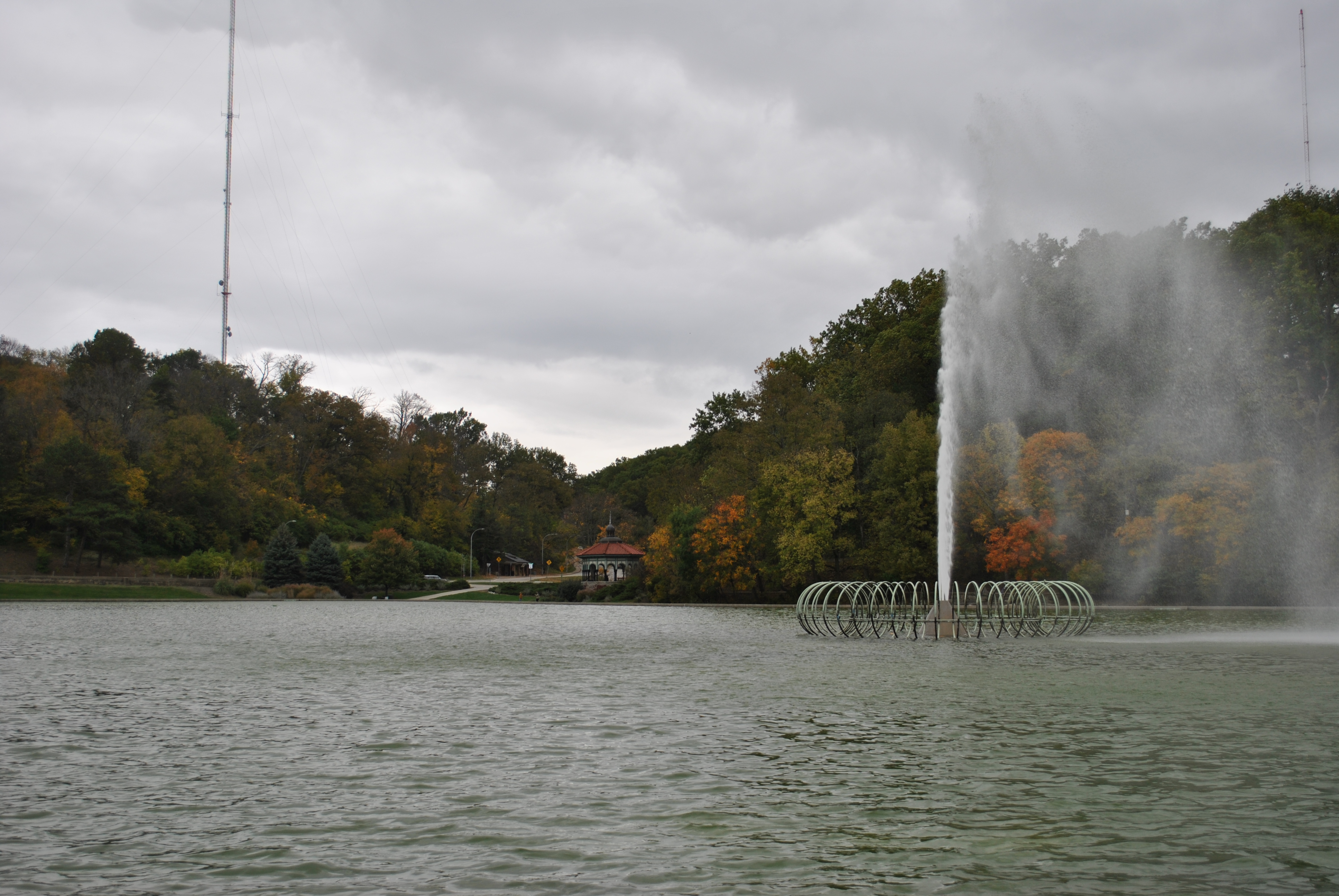
Mirror Lake with Spring House Gazebo in background

Eden Park holds a number of city landmarks and landscape features. The Elsinore Arch, built in 1883, serves as a natural entrance to the park.

The 1904 Spring House Gazebo is the oldest enduring structure in a Cincinnati park, and as an icon of the entire park system it appears in the logo of the Cincinnati Park Board. The Park Board Administration building is situated by the Gilbert Avenue entrance.

The Cincinnati Art Museum complex is located in the park. It is linked to the Elsinore Arch via a flight of wooded hillside Cincinnati steps. The Art Academy of Cincinnati was formerly adjacent to the Art Museum, until relocating to the Over-the-Rhine neighborhood. Live entertainment venues include Cincinnati Playhouse in the Park and the Seasongood Pavilion, a natural amphitheater built in 1959 and named for Cincinnati mayor Murray Seasongood.

The Krohn Conservatory is a Gothic Revival and Art Deco Style public conservatory completed in 1933. A flight of Cincinnati steps lead from Krohn Conservatory to the Presidents' Grove trail through a row of trees planted in honor of U.S. presidents. The first tree, an oak planted in 1882, honors George Washington.

The Twin Lakes area features a footbridge traversing adjoining lakes, at the site of a former quarry. Near the footbridge is a grove of buckeye trees (Aesculus glabra), the state tree of Ohio.

Public art at the Twin Lakes includes the Capitoline Wolf Statue replica, a gift of the City of Rome, and the statue of a cormorant fisher, a gift from Cincinnati's sister city Gifu in Japan. Two structures at the Twin Lakes, a concession stand and comfort station, were built by the Civilian Conservation Corps (CCC) in 1937.

A road from the Twin Lakes leads past the Vietnam Veterans Memorial and over the historic Melan Arch Bridge to the Eden Park Overlook near the park's highest point. The Ohio River Monument stands overlooking the river valley. It was dedicated by President Herbert Hoover in 1929 to commemorate canalization of the river for year-round water transport.

== Events ==
Many events are held at Eden Park annually including the popular EdenSong Music Series every Friday in July at the Seasongood Pavilion. The series is sponsored by the Cincinnati Park Board and the Queen City Balladeers.

Each November, Eden Park also hosts "Balluminaria", one of the largest hot air balloon glow events in the country.
