= Walter L. Rapp =

Walter L. Rapp (1879–1974) was an architect in Cincinnati, Ohio. He was the "last member of an important Cincinnati architectural dynasty" and one of several prominent Ohio architects to graduate from Massachusetts Institute of Technology (class of 1900). He was part of Rapp & Son after 1901; Rapp, Zettel & Rapp from 1903–1912; Zettel & Rapp from 1913–1930 and Rapp & Meacham from 1931-1958 with Standish Meacham, Rapp's son-in-law. Rapp & Meacham were best known for their residential work, projects written about in a biography on W.L. Rapp authored by his daughter, "Mrs. Standish (Eleanor) Meacham".

== Projects ==
- Krohn Conservatory in Eden Park
- Proctor [sic] Memorial Wing of Children's Hospital in Mt. Auburn
- Jenny Porter High School in Hillsdale
- Lotspeich School
- Lincoln National Bank building in Northwest Cincinnati on Fourth and Vine streets
- buildings of the Fifth Third Union Co.
- R.K. LeBlond Machine Tool Co. in Hyde Park/Norwood
- Cincinnati Milling Machine Co. building (which became Cincinnati Milacron, Oakley)
- Trailmobile Co. building

=== Residences ===
- Frederick V. Geier house
- Dr. William T. and Louise Taft Semple house, called "Mt. Olympus", (demolished ca. 2007) in Indian Hill
- R. K. LeBlond mansion in Columbia Tusculum
