= Owl's Nest Park =

City park in Cincinnati, Ohio, United States

Coordinates: 39.133°N 84.464°W

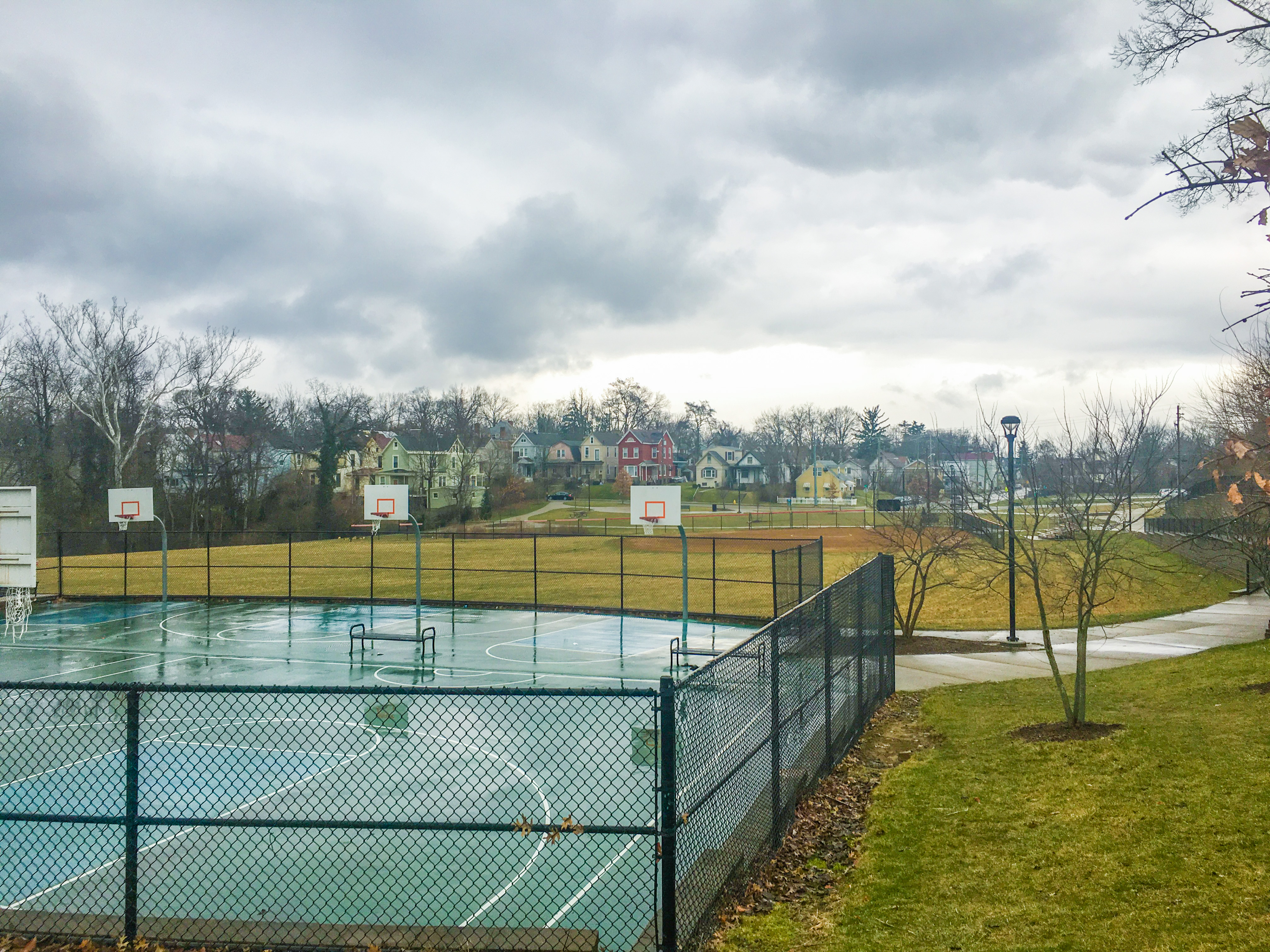
Owl's Nest Park, March 2019

Owl's Nest Park is an urban park in the East Walnut Hills and Evanston neighborhoods of Cincinnati, Ohio, United States, owned and operated by the Cincinnati Park Board.

The land containing the park was donated in 1905 by Charles E. and Edward C. Perkins. A boulder with plaque marks the spot where the Perkins house once stood.

Beginning in 2005, the park was extensively renovated.
