= Eden Park Stand Pipe =

- U.S. National Register of Historic Places
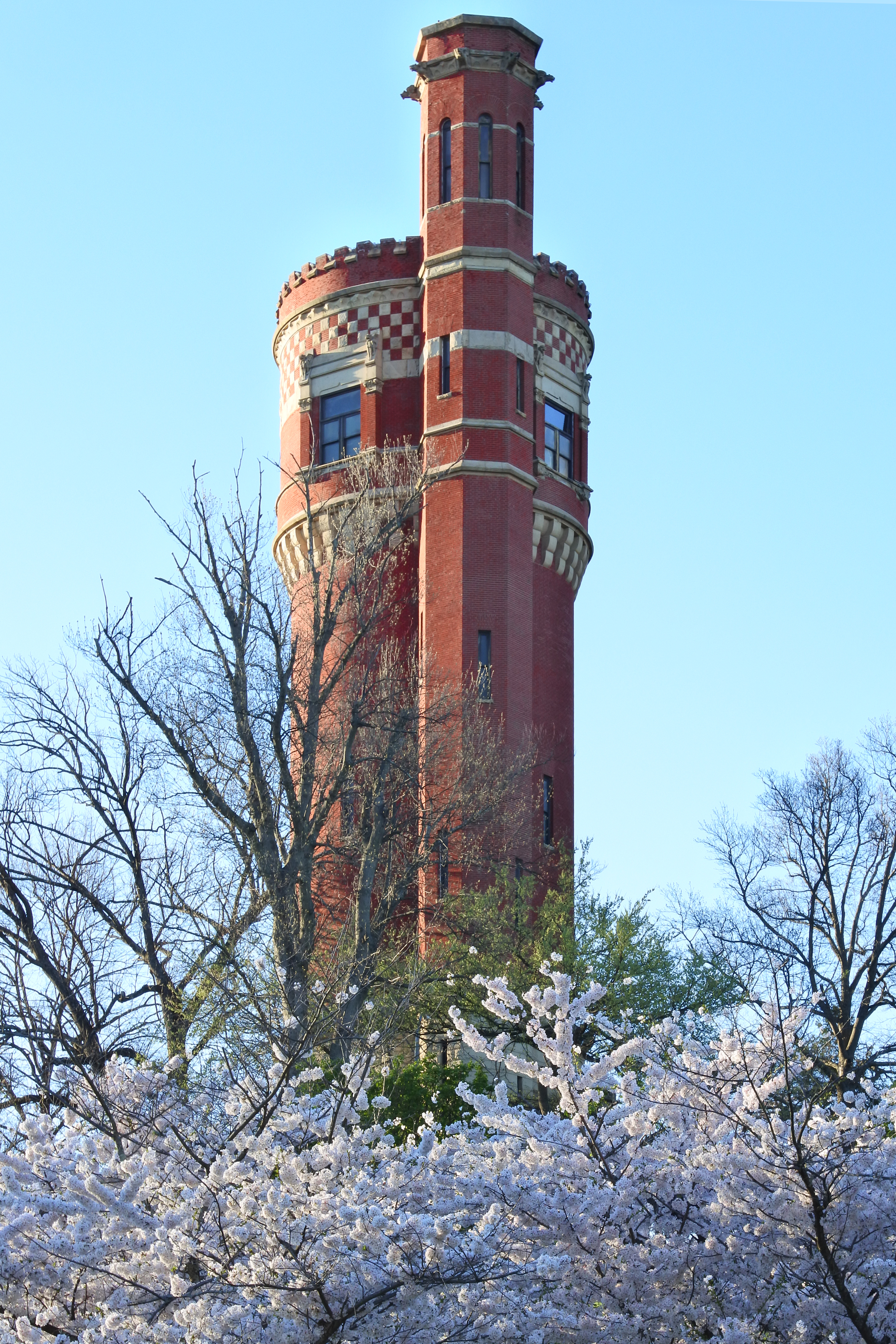

- Location within Ohio Location within the United States
- Location: Eden Park Dr., Cincinnati, Ohio
- Coordinates: 39°7′2″N 84°29′25″W
- Area: less than one acre
- Built: 1894
- Architect: Samuel Hannaford & Sons, and the David Hummel Construction Company
- Architectural style: Late and Eclectic Victorian
- MPS: Samuel Hannaford and Sons TR in Hamilton County
- NRHP reference No.: 80003048
- Added to NRHP: March 3, 1980

Eden Park Standpipe is a historical standpipe located on the elevated environment of Eden Park in Cincinnati, Ohio. The standpipe is a form of water tower prevalent in the late 1800s. It was listed in the National Register on March 3, 1980.

The standpipe was constructed in 1894 by the Cincinnati firm architect Samuel Hannaford, it stands at 172 feet (52 m) tall. It was constructed to supply sufficient water pressure for the surrounding area of Walnut Hills, Cincinnati. Water was directed into the standpipe from the Ohio River by means of the neighboring Eden Park Station No. 7. It distributed water into one 36-inch (910 mm) and two 24-inch (610 mm) mains. However, The original standpipe became obsolete and eventually went out of operation in 1916 as the city developed further and modern water towers were established. Visitors can no longer access a public observation site that existed during its operation.

In 1943, the turret's copper spire was taken down for a war scrap campaign. The city currently uses the structure as a communications tower.
