= Bradford-Felter Tanglewood =

Park in Ohio, United States

Coordinates: 39°10′46″N 84°33′23″W

Bradford-Felter Tanglewood is a 176-acre (710,000 m^{2}) city park in the neighborhood of Mount Airy in Cincinnati, Ohio, owned and operated by the Cincinnati Park Board. The park area was donated to the city in 1938 by Lloyd F. Felter, at the time consisting of just over 38 acres (150,000 m^{2}) and called Felter Tanglewood. The park board obtained an additional 83 acres (340,000 m^{2}) in 1978, half of which they purchased and the other half donated by Ray Tully Bradford and his wife. In the years since other land donations and purchases were made, resulting in the current land area.
