= Cardinal Pacelli School =

Catholic school in Ohio, United States

Coordinates: 39°07′38″N 84°25′50″W

- Cincinnati, Ohio

Information
- Established: 1927
- Grades: Preschool - Grade 8

Cardinal Pacelli School is a Catholic school located in Cincinnati, Ohio in the heart of Mount Lookout, covering preschool, kindergarten, and first through eighth grades.

== History ==
In September 1927, a 4-room school building was built and opened with the Sisters of Notre Dame de Namur in charge. Enrollment was initially 108 students, but by 1936 it was 202 students and a larger school building was planned.

On October 31, 1936, Eugenio Cardinal Pacelli, Secretary of State to Pope Pius XI, blessed the cornerstone for the new school. To honor the visit of the Cardinal, the new building was named The Cardinal Pacelli School.

In 1962, a second floor with eight classrooms and a principal's office was added to the school building. In 1971 the Sisters of Notre Dame de Namur found it necessary to end their relationship with the school due to declining vocations and pressing needs in other ministries.

In 1993 the parish completed construction of its Parish Center which includes a gym, art room and meeting rooms. At that time the original school gym was remodeled into offices, a new school library and a computer lab. Since that time the gym has been remodeled adding a second floor, including a science lab, Computer Lab, art room and library. The first floor of the old gym has been turned into new school offices and kindergarten classrooms.

== High School Attendance ==
Cardinal Pacelli is generally a feeder school to Cincinnati area private Catholic high schools Such as St. Xavier High School (Cincinnati), Archbishop Moeller High School, Archbishop McNicholas High School, St. Ursula Academy and Ursuline Academy.

== Awards ==
In 2008, the school was named a Blue Ribbon School
