= Eden Park Station No. 7 =

- U.S. National Register of Historic Places
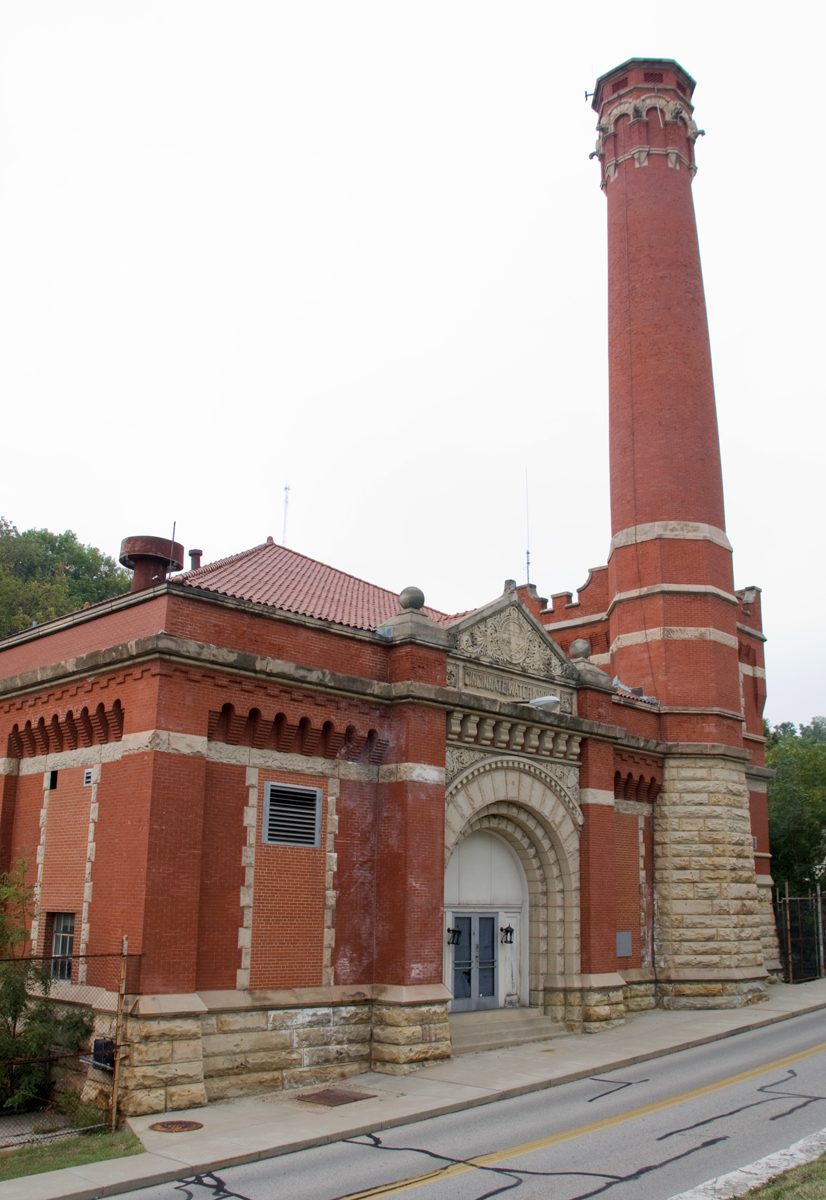
- Eastern front of the station

- Location within Ohio Location within the United States
- Location: 1430 Martin Dr., Cincinnati, Ohio
- Coordinates: 39°6′47″N 84°29′28″W
- Area: Less than 1 acre (0.40 ha)
- Built: 1889
- Architect: Samuel Hannaford and Sons; David Hummel Construction Co.
- Architectural style: Late Victorian, Eclectic Victorian
- MPS: Samuel Hannaford and Sons TR in Hamilton County
- NRHP reference No.: 80003049
- Added to NRHP: March 3, 1980

The Eden Park Station No. 7 is a historic structure located in Eden Park in Cincinnati, Ohio, United States. Constructed in the late nineteenth century as a significant part of the city water supply system, it was used for its original purpose for only a few decades. As a work of architect Samuel Hannaford, it has been named a historic site.

== History ==
Cincinnati city officials began to build the Eden Park Station in 1889, with construction overseen by the David Hummel Construction Company, but five years passed before it was completed. The station formed part of the city's water supply network, raising water from the nearby Ohio River and moving it into the Eden Park Standpipe, which was finished in the same year as the pumping station. When built, the station was able to move 16 million US gallons (61 Ml) of water with Snyder and Holly pumps, but only for a few years did the network operate as designed. A new station in the East End opened in 1907 to replace the stations in Eden Park and on Front Street downtown; contamination in the nearby Deer Creek, which by this time had been converted into a sewer, was severe to the point that the nearby waters of the Ohio River were polluted to an unsafe extent. After years of little use, the station was restored to usefulness in 1939, as its tower was converted into a radio station for police purposes.

== Architecture ==
City officials employed Samuel Hannaford as the architect for the Eden Park Station. By 1889, Hannaford was the city's premier architect: he had designed the grand Music Hall near downtown in the 1870s, he was favored as a residential architect by the metropolitan area's elites, and he had produced structures far from the Cincinnati metropolitan area, including the tall Vigo County Courthouse in Terre Haute, Indiana and the smaller Perry County Jail in faraway Pinckneyville, Illinois. Many of his functional buildings still standing in Cincinnati are eclectic in style; instead of insisting on a specific style or styles, Hannaford freely designed in many different styles popular in the late nineteenth century. The Eden Park Station is typical of these, exhibiting features of the Neoclassical, the Queen Anne, and the Romanesque Revival styles. Although the walls of the building and its associated chimney are brick, the building rests on a stone foundation, and the roof is tiled. Sandstone is employed for decorative arches placed underneath a Neoclassical pediment to form the frontispiece. The tallest parts of the station are four stories tall.

== Preservation ==
In early 1980, the Eden Park Station was listed on the National Register of Historic Places, qualifying because of its historically significant architecture. It was one of dozens of Hannaford-designed buildings in Hamilton County listed on the Register together as a multiple property submission. Two of the buildings in the submission were related to the station: the Elsinore Arch, a castle-shaped structure near Eden Park housing valves for the water system, and the Eden Park Standpipe.
