= Annwood Park =

Park in Cincinnati, Ohio, United States

Coordinates: 39.130772°N 84.466823°W

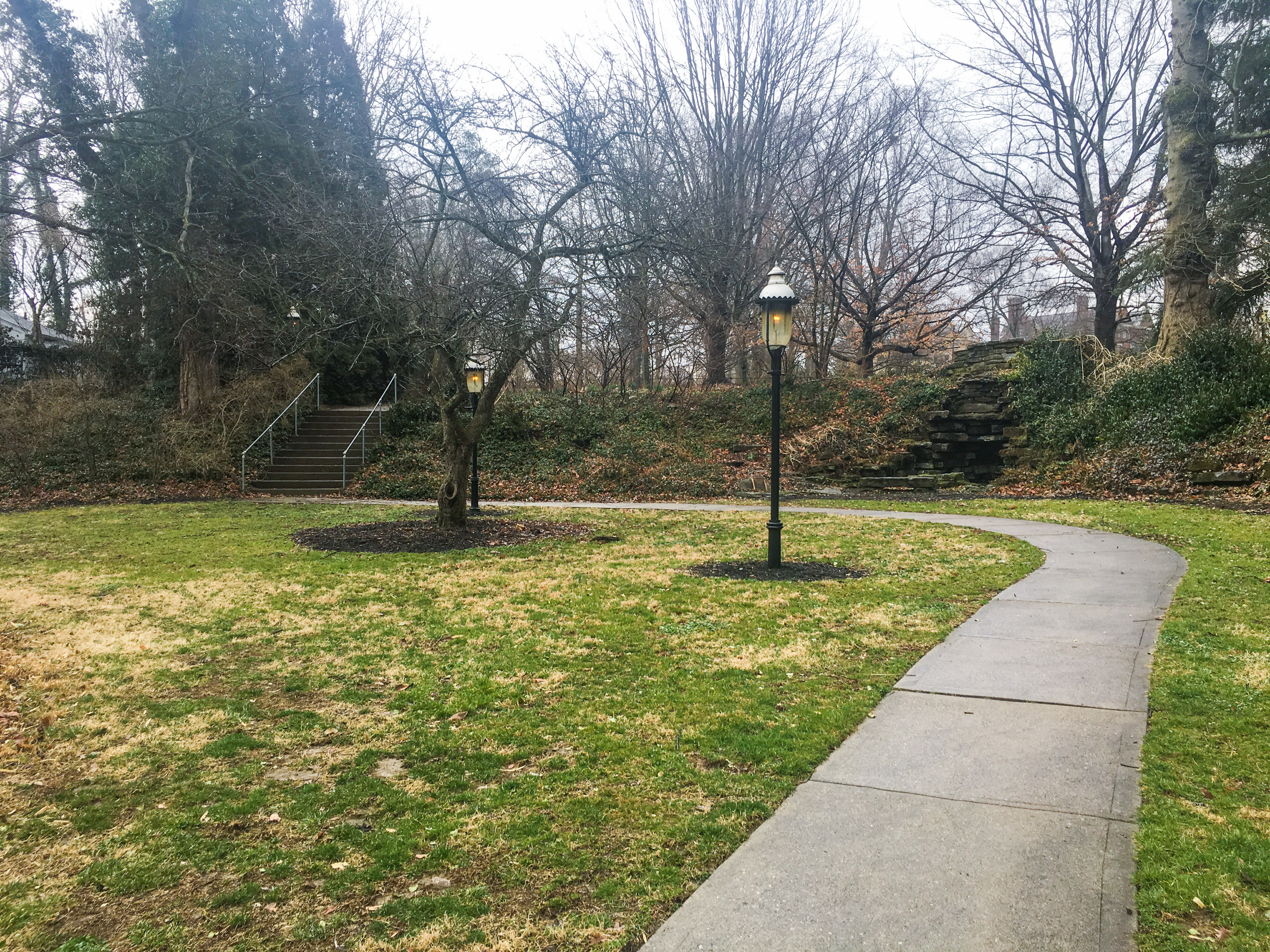
Annwood Park, view of grotto, March 2019

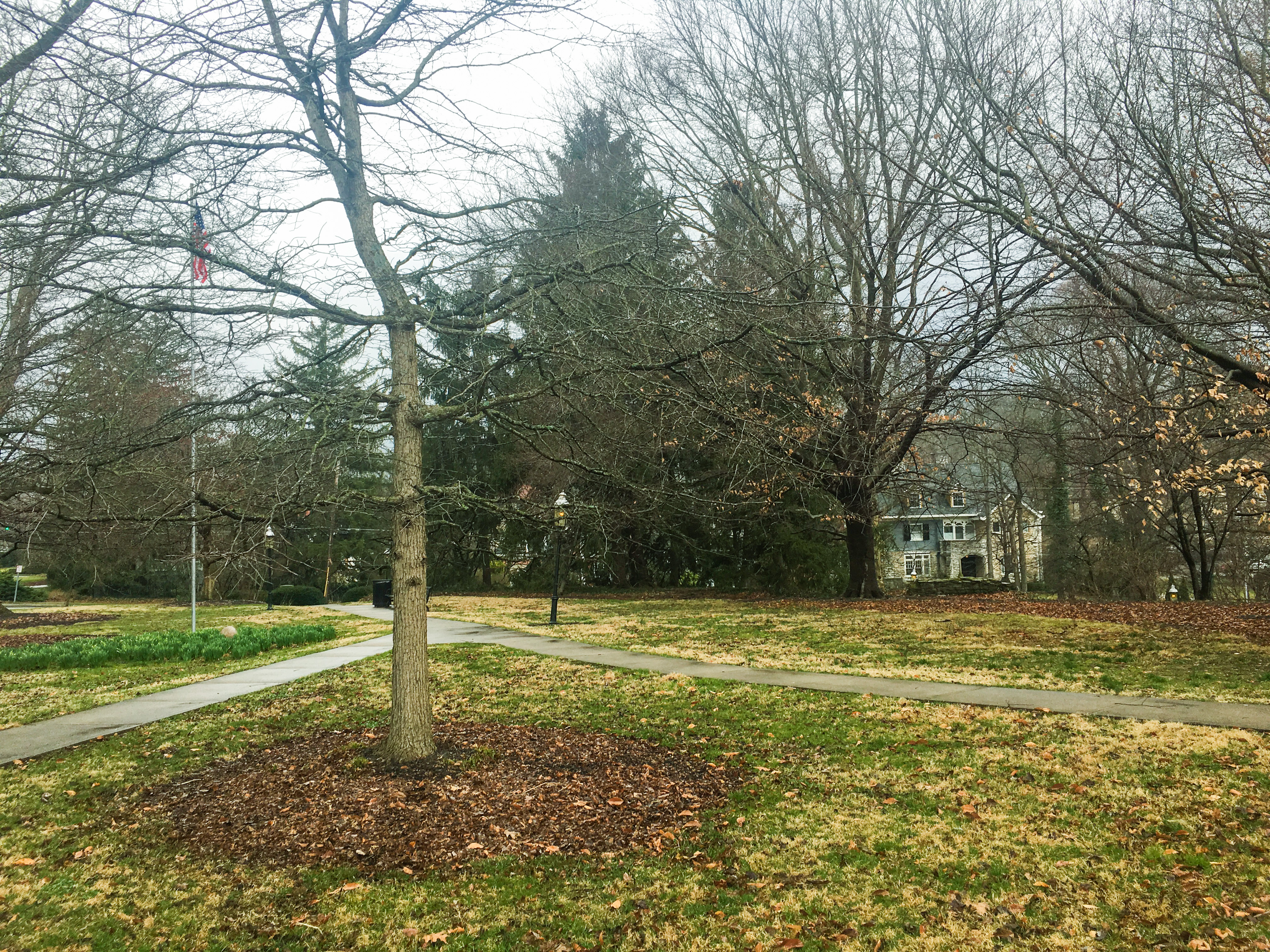
Annwood Park, March 2019

Annwood Park is an urban park in the East Walnut Hills neighborhood of Cincinnati, Ohio, owned and operated by the Cincinnati Park Board. A small park, Annwood was donated to Cincinnati in 1966 and added expanded in 1969. The park is never to be resold and contains no playgrounds or picnic area, as part of the donation agreement. The park is only for walking and sitting, and contains a grotto waterfall and memorial plaque in honor of a local Korean War veteran.
