= Ault Park =

Park in Cincinnati, Ohio

Coordinates: 39.132908°N 84.410959°W

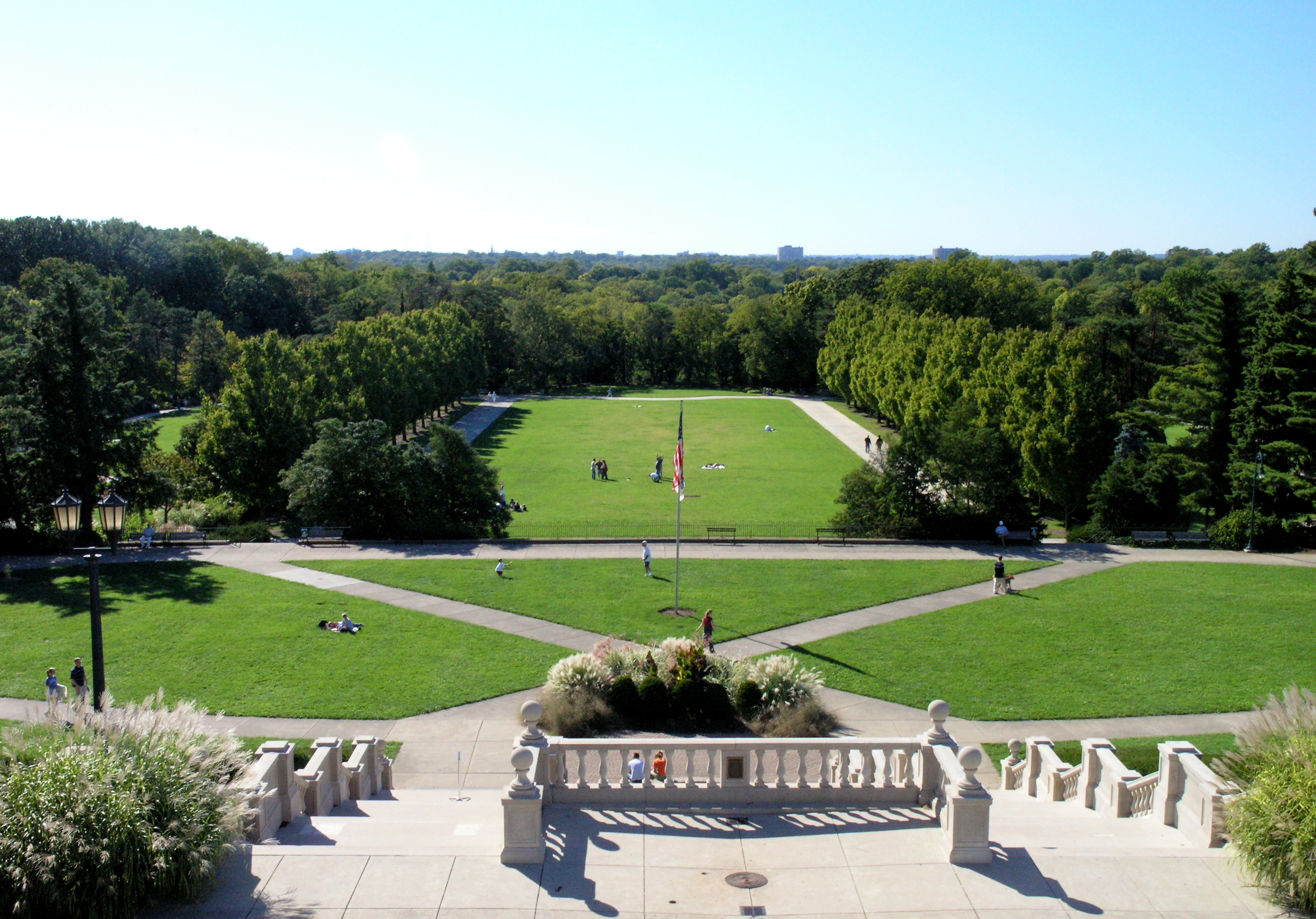
- View from pavilion second floor
- Interactive map of Ault Park
- Location: Cincinnati, OH
- Area: c. 224 acres (91 ha)
- Created: 1911
- Operator: City of Cincinnati Parks Department

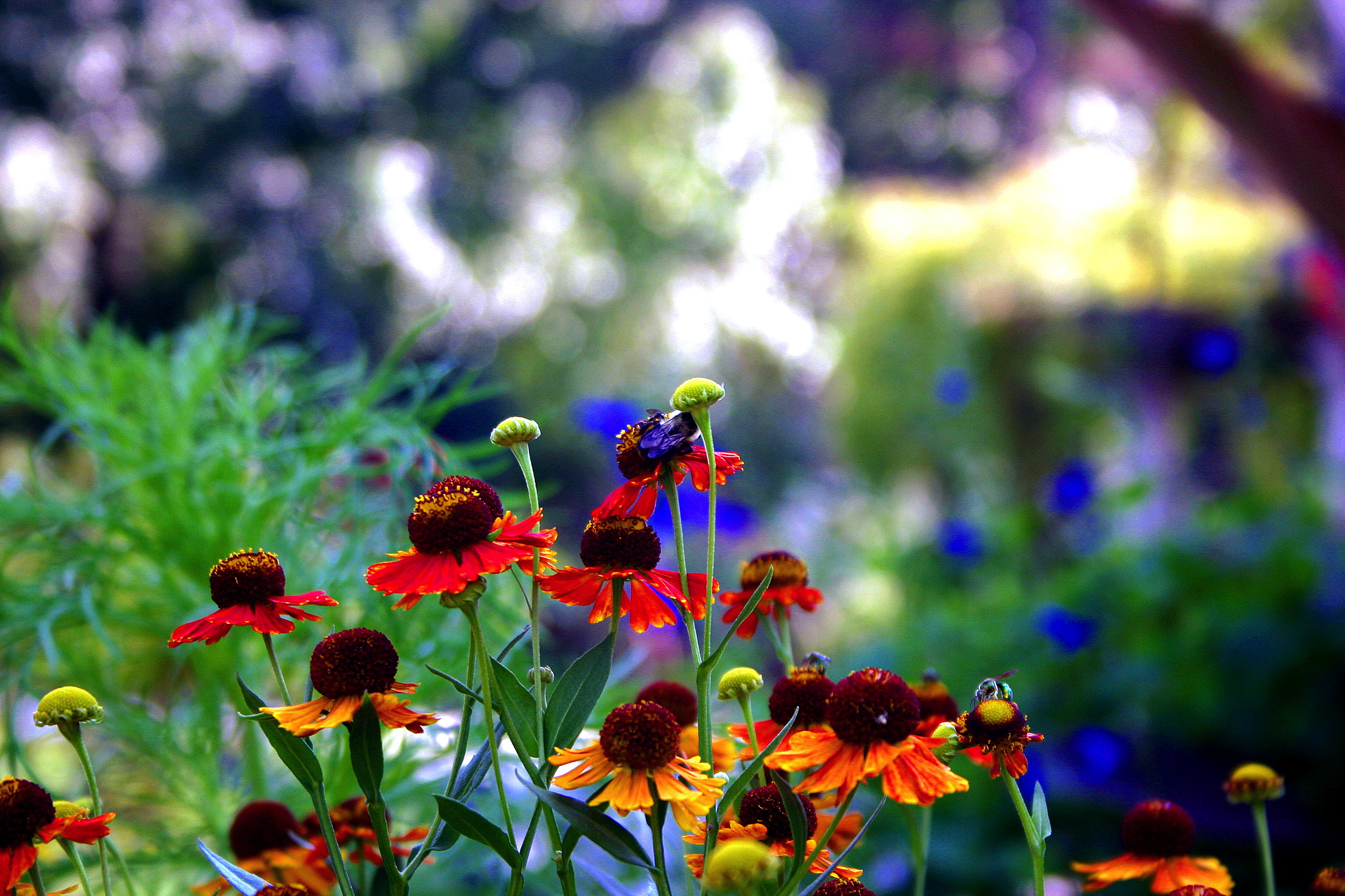
Flowers at Ault Park

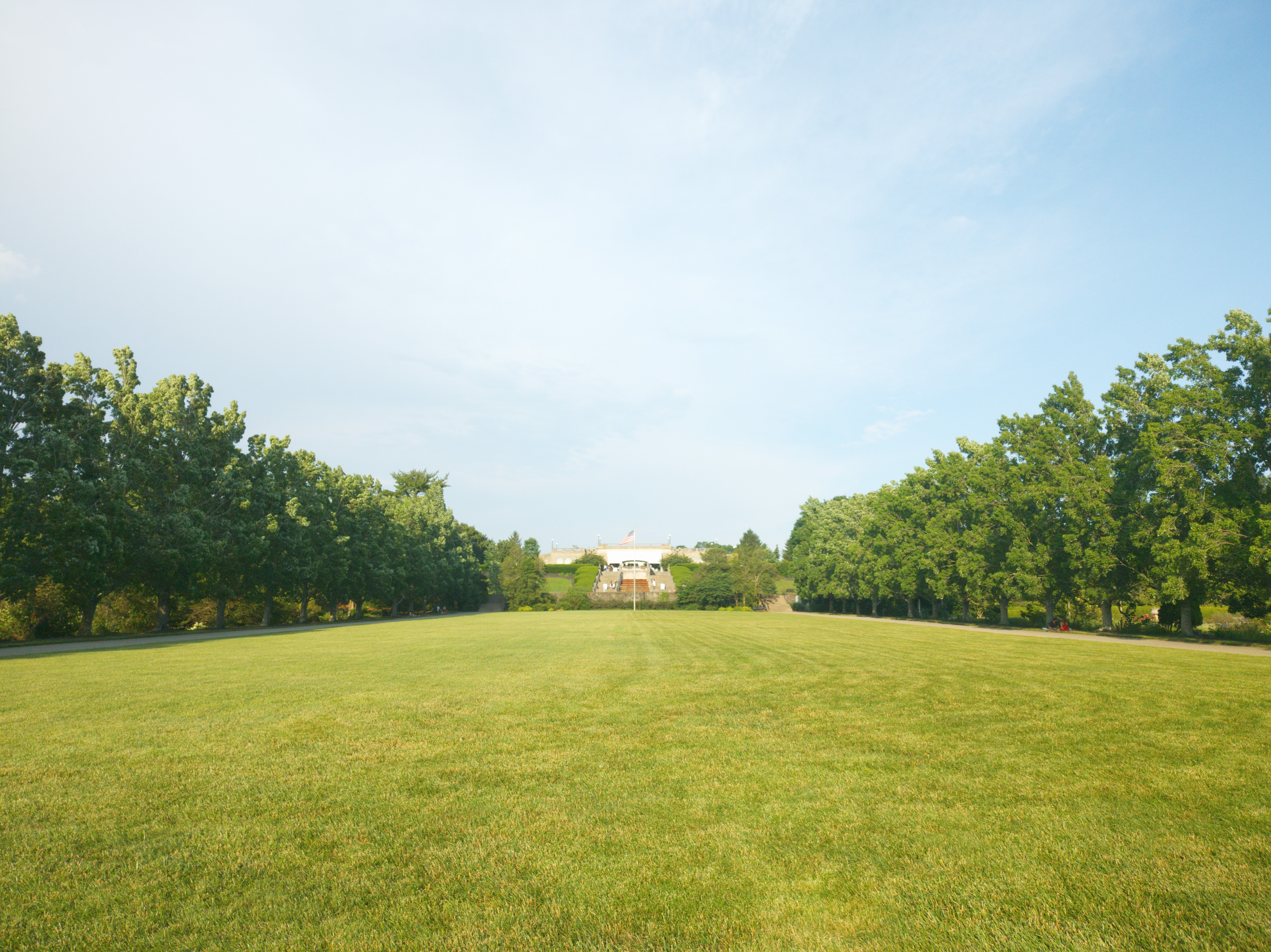
The spacious Great Lawn of Ault Park facing the pavilion

Ault Park is the fourth-largest park in Cincinnati at 223.949 acres (0.9 km^{2}), owned and operated by the Cincinnati Park Board. It lies in the Mount Lookout neighborhood on the city's east side. The hilltop park has an overlook which commands extensive panoramic views of the Little Miami River valley.

The park is named in honor of Ida May Ault and her husband Levi Addison Ault, who was prominent in the development of Cincinnati parks. In the park's early years, 97 sheep were employed to trim the lawns and shrubs.

The park sports a soccer field, playground, and a flower garden, first designed by George Kessler and later modified by A. D. Taylor. At the center of the park is a large Pavilion, built in 1930 in the Italian Renaissance-style. The Pavilion is used frequently for dances, parties, and weddings.

== Public Garden ==
In 1980 the Cincinnati Park Board asked its volunteer organization based out of Krohn Conservatory to implement an adopt-a-plot program for the Ault Park gardens, encouraging citizens to adopt a plot of the garden. The program's success was recognized by the 1983 Daniel Flaherty Park Excellence Award. The adopt-a-plot program is still in use today and has become popular in parks over the whole country.

== Events ==
Ault Park plays host to a large 4th of July celebration and fireworks display. It also hosts the Ault Park Concours d'Elegance, an invitational display of antique and exotic cars that is the second-oldest of its type in the United States. The park also hosts a summer concert series and an annual dance Night.

On October 9, 2008, Democratic presidential candidate Barack Obama spoke to a crowd of about 15,000 from atop the Ault Park Pavilion.
