= Alm =

Alm and ALM most commonly refer to:

- Alms, i.e. donations
- Alm (surname), a Swedish surname
- Alm (pasture), a managed Alpine grazing or hay-producing area
- All Lives Matter, a slogan associated with criticism of the Black Lives Matter movement
- Asset and liability management, the practice of managing financial risks

Alm or ALM may also refer to:

== Businesses and organizations ==
- Agence de Location du Matériel, a company that supplied rental equipment to road construction and repair companies in Burundi
- ALM (company), an American business news media company
- ALM Antillean Airlines, a defunct Curaçaoan airline
- Alm. Brand, a Danish financial services group
- Arab Liberation Movement, a former Syrian political party
- LIFE Church UK, a British Christian megachurch, previously known as Abundant Life Ministries
- Union Grand-Duc Adolphe, a music organization in Luxembourg, previously known as Allgemeiner Luxemburger Musikverein

== Places ==
- Alm (river), a river in Upper Austria, Austria
- Alm, a stream in the municipality of Altena, North Brabant, Netherlands

== Science and technology ==
- Almandine, a garnet mineral
- Additive layer manufacturing, a type of 3D-printing
- Application lifecycle management, the product lifecycle management of computer programs
- Arabic letter mark, a writing direction Unicode control character
- Article-level metrics, which measure the usage and impact of individual scholarly articles

== Sports ==
- AG2R La Mondiale, a bicycle racing team, UCI code
- Bielefelder Alm, a stadium in Bielefeld, Germany
- A-League Men, a top-level professional football league in Australia
- ALM Motorsport, an Estonian racing team

== Transportation ==
- Arkansas, Louisiana and Mississippi Railroad, a shortline railroad owned by Genesee & Wyoming
- Alamein railway station, Melbourne, Victoria, Australia, station code ALM
- Alamogordo–White Sands Regional Airport, Alamogordo, New Mexico, US, IATA airport code ALM
- Alnmouth railway station, Northumberland, England, United Kingdom, station code ALM

== Other uses ==
- ʾAlif Lām Mīm, the opening letters of six surahs of the Quran
- Alm, one of the two protagonists of Fire Emblem Gaiden and its remake, Fire Emblem Echoes: Shadows of Valentia
- Artium Liberalium Magister, the Latin name for a Master of Arts in Liberal Studies

== See also ==
- Alms (disambiguation)
