= Alms Park =

Public park in Cincinnati, Ohio

- Interactive map of Alms Park
- Type: Urban park
- Location: Cincinnati, Ohio, United States
- Coordinates: 39.111316°N 84.428994°W
- Area: 85 acres (0.34 km^{2})
- Owner: Cincinnati Park Board
- Open: 6:00 a.m. to 10:00 p.m.

Frederick H. Alms Memorial Park (often shortened to Alms Park) is an urban park located in the Mt. Lookout and Columbia-Tusculum neighborhoods of Cincinnati, Ohio. It is owned and operated by the Cincinnati Park Board, and its entrance is located at 650 Tusculum Avenue.

== History ==
In 1916, 85 acres (34 ha) of land was donated to the city by Mrs. Frederick H. Alms on the condition a park be established in honor of her late husband. The land was originally owned by Nicholas Longworth, once the wealthiest man in Cincinnati and patriarch of the Longworth family.

The landscaping was designed by the Cleveland, Ohio, landscape architect Albert Davis Taylor. The park's centerpiece, a pavilion in the Italian Renaissance style, was completed in 1929 by architects Stanley Matthews and Charles Wilkins Short, Jr.

A bronze statue of Stephen Foster, author of "My Old Kentucky Home", was installed in Alms Park in 1937. It faces south, towards the hills of Kentucky.
