= East Walnut Hills, Cincinnati =

Coordinates: 39°7′30″N 84°28′40″W

East Walnut Hills
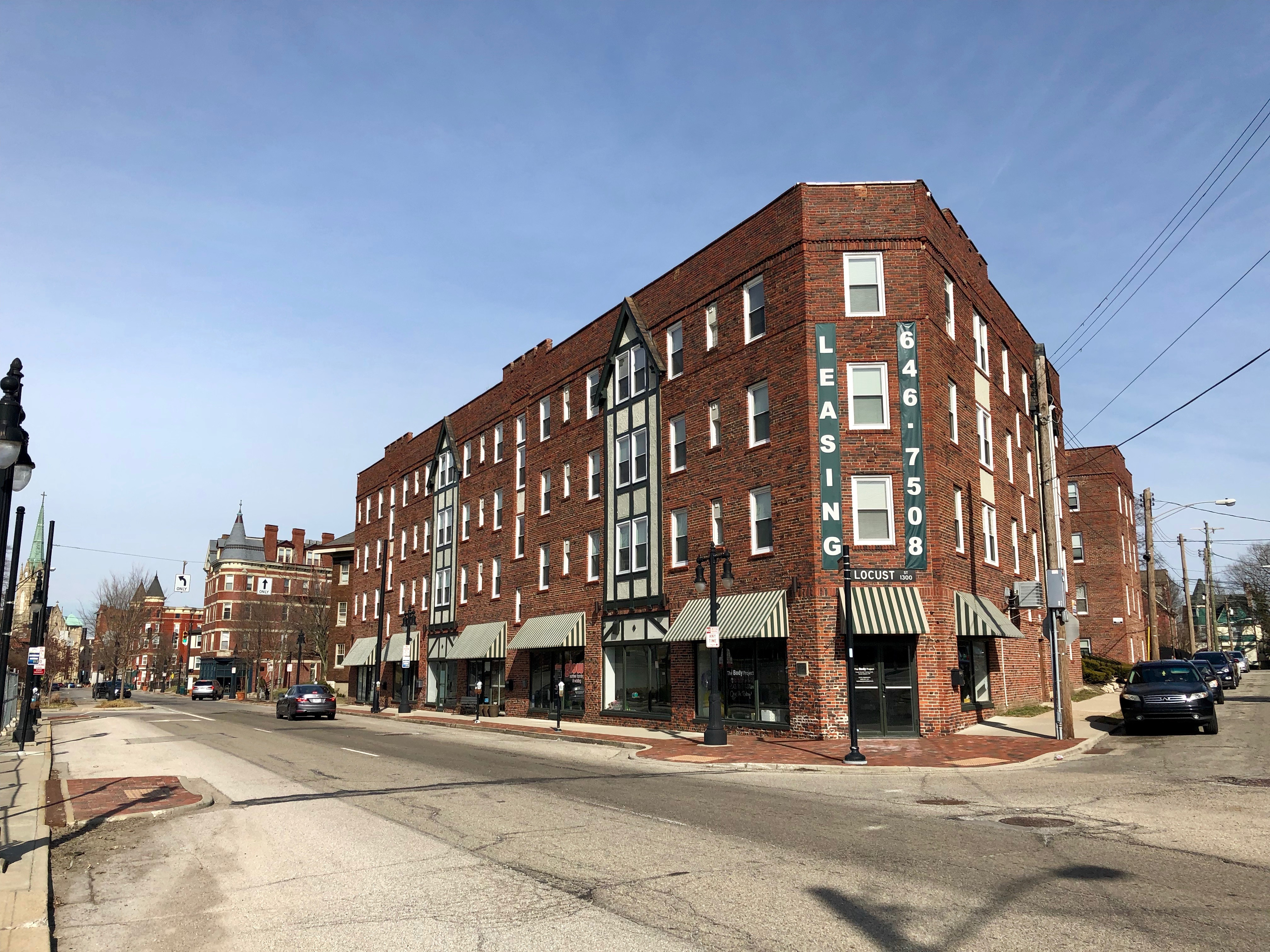
- Bulluck Terrace Condos, East Walnut Hills, Cincinnati

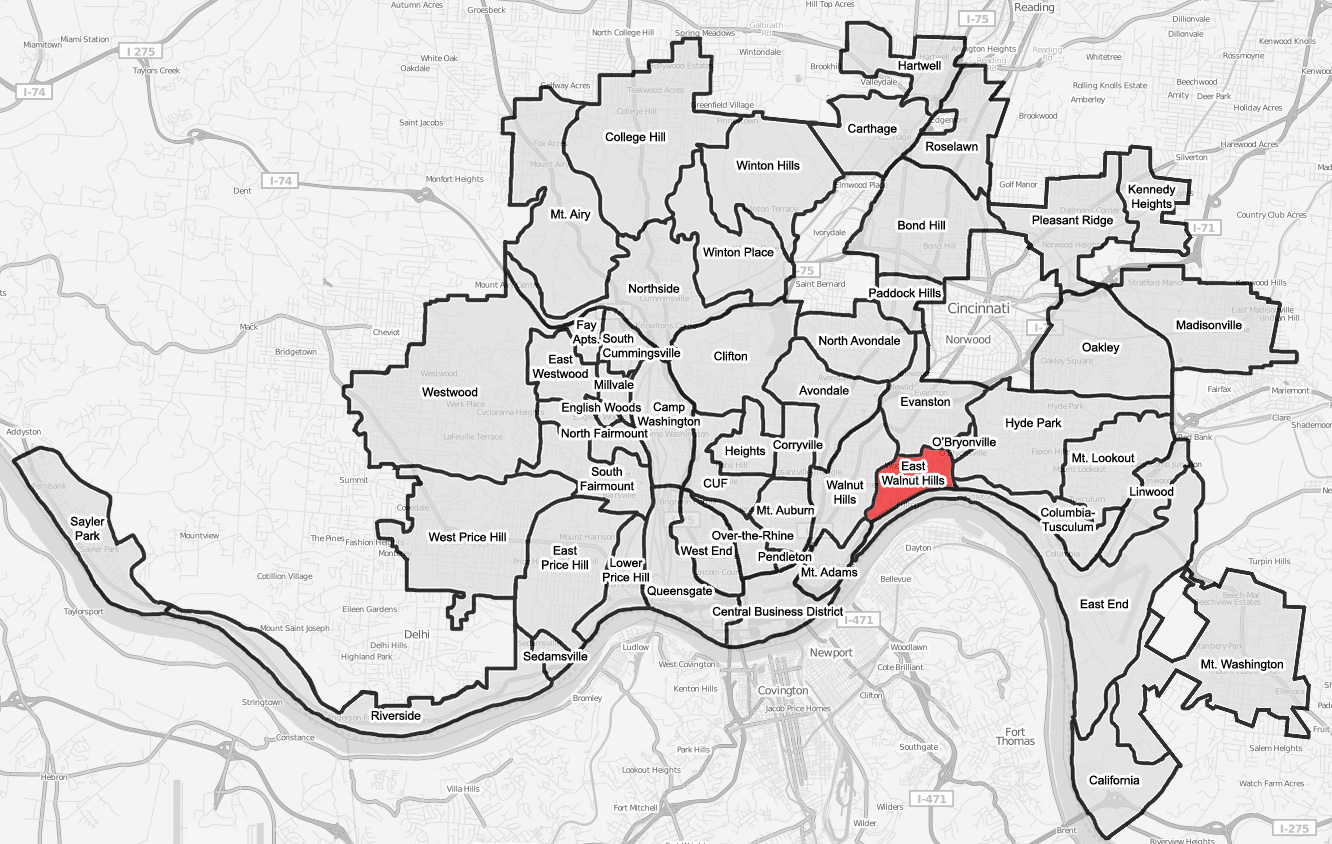
- East Walnut Hills is a neighborhood of Cincinnati, Ohio
- Country: United States
- State: Ohio
- City: Cincinnati

Population (2020)
  - Total: 4,103

East Walnut Hills is one of the 52 neighborhoods of Cincinnati, Ohio. Established in 1867 and annexed in 1873, it is located in the eastern side of the city. The population was 4,103 at the 2020 census.

== History ==
Founded in 1867 as the incorporated Village of Woodburn, East Walnut Hills is known as the home to many prominent Cincinnatians. Initially developed by combining a small German Catholic community and the suburban estates of Cincinnati businessmen, the village was annexed into Cincinnati by 1873.

=== Historic architecture and former residents ===
The neighborhood includes a historic district between the O'Bryonville business district (Evanston) and the DeSales Corner, home to mansions with large setbacks, as well as Annwood Park on Madison Road and the Bettman Preserve, an urban nature preserve. Large estates line William Howard Taft Road, with views of the Ohio River and Downtown Cincinnati. Many older homes in the areas surrounding St. Ursula Academy are being subdivided and converted into condominiums. East Walnut Hills is home to the historic Saint Francis De Sales Catholic Church and School, at the intersection of Madison Road and Woodburn Avenue and Purcell Marian High School. East Walnut Hills' historic homes demonstrate several architectural styles. Examples of the Romantic period, Colonial Revival, Tudor Revival, Queen Ann, Romanesque, Italian Revival, and English Country Revival can be seen. The homes of East Walnut Hills are often featured in local historic home and garden tours.

Formerly known as Madisonville Pike in the early 1850s, Madison Road is the site of the earliest development in the neighborhood. The historic John S. Baker House was designed by Cincinnati Architect James Keys Wilson. Other prominent East Walnut Hills residents are William W. Scarborough, grocery merchant, Joshua Hall Bates, a Union general who built his home in 1858, and Civil War veteran and heir to a liquor baron Charles Dexter.

The neighborhood is known as an urban forest because of the number of large trees. There is also a bird sanctuary between Wold Ave and Dexter Place.

== Demographics ==
Population of East Walnut Hills 1900-2020
Year	Pop.	±%
1900	3,325	—
1910	3,977	+19.6%
1920	4,925	+23.8%
1930	5,217	+5.9%
1940	5,543	+6.2%
1950	6,018	+8.6%
1960	5,350	−11.1%
1970	5,425	+1.4%
1980	4,106	−24.3%
1990	3,741	−8.9%
2000	3,630	−3.0%
2010	3,794	+4.5%
2020	4,103	+8.1%

As of the census of 2020, there were 4,103 people living in the neighborhood. There were 2,715 housing units. The racial makeup of the neighborhood was 70.9% White, 18.0% Black or African American, 0.2% Native American, 2.9% Asian, 0.2% Pacific Islander, 1.2% from some other race, and 6.6% from two or more races. 3.2% of the population were Hispanic or Latino of any race.

There were 2,346 households, out of which 33.1% were families. 56.7% of all households were made up of individuals.

6.2% of the neighborhood's population were under the age of 18, 73.0% were 18 to 64, and 20.8% were 65 years of age or older. 40.2% of the population were male and 59.8% were female.

According to the U.S. Census American Community Survey, for the period 2016-2020 the estimated median annual income for a household in the neighborhood was $67,407. About 2.9% of family households were living below the poverty line. About 70.7% had a bachelor's degree or higher.

== See also ==
- John S. Baker House, located in East Walnut Hills
