= Mount Lookout, Cincinnati =

Coordinates: 39°07′44″N 84°25′49″W

Mount Lookout
- Neighborhood of Cincinnati
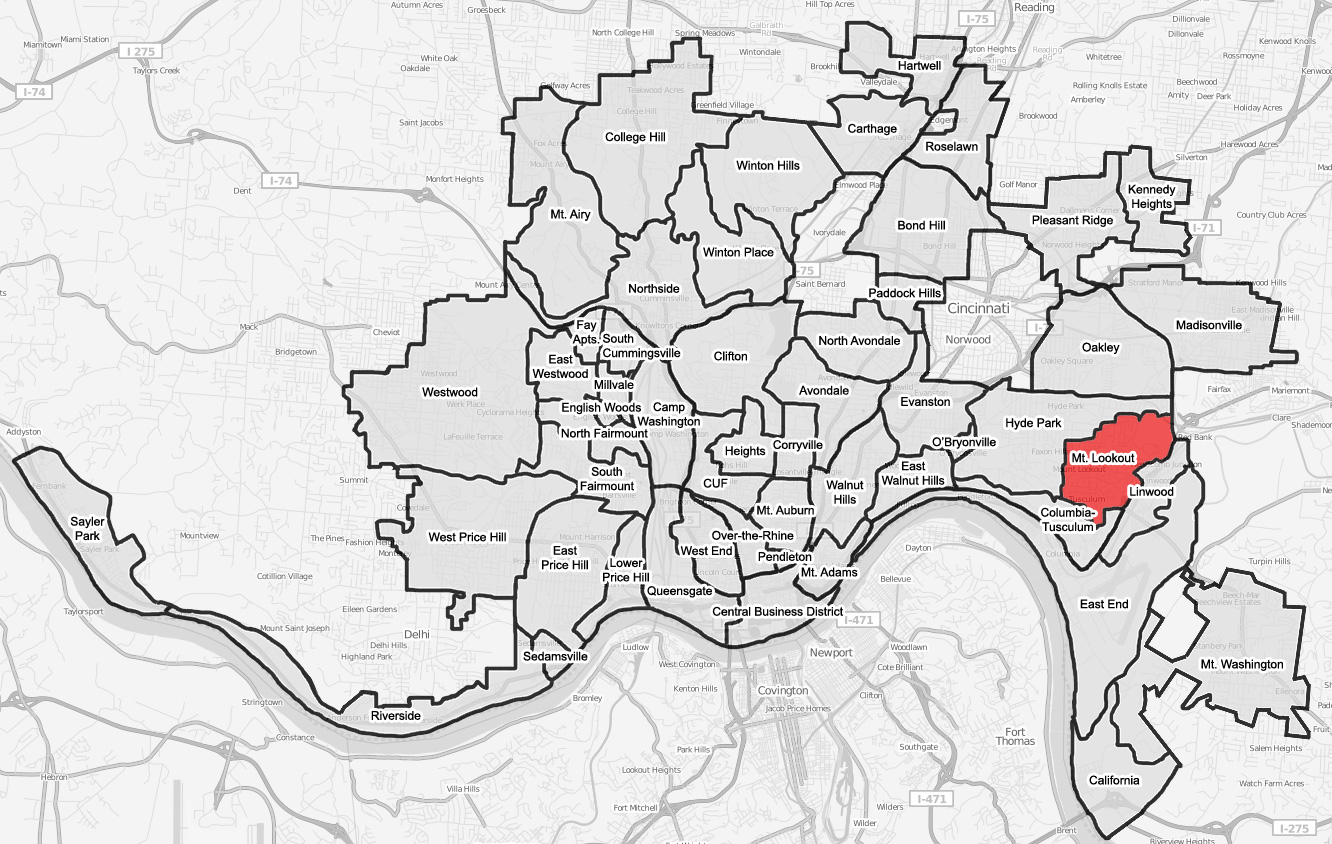
- Mount Lookout (red) within Cincinnati, Ohio
- Country: United States
- State: Ohio
- County: Hamilton
- City: Cincinnati

Population (2020)
  - Total: 5,173

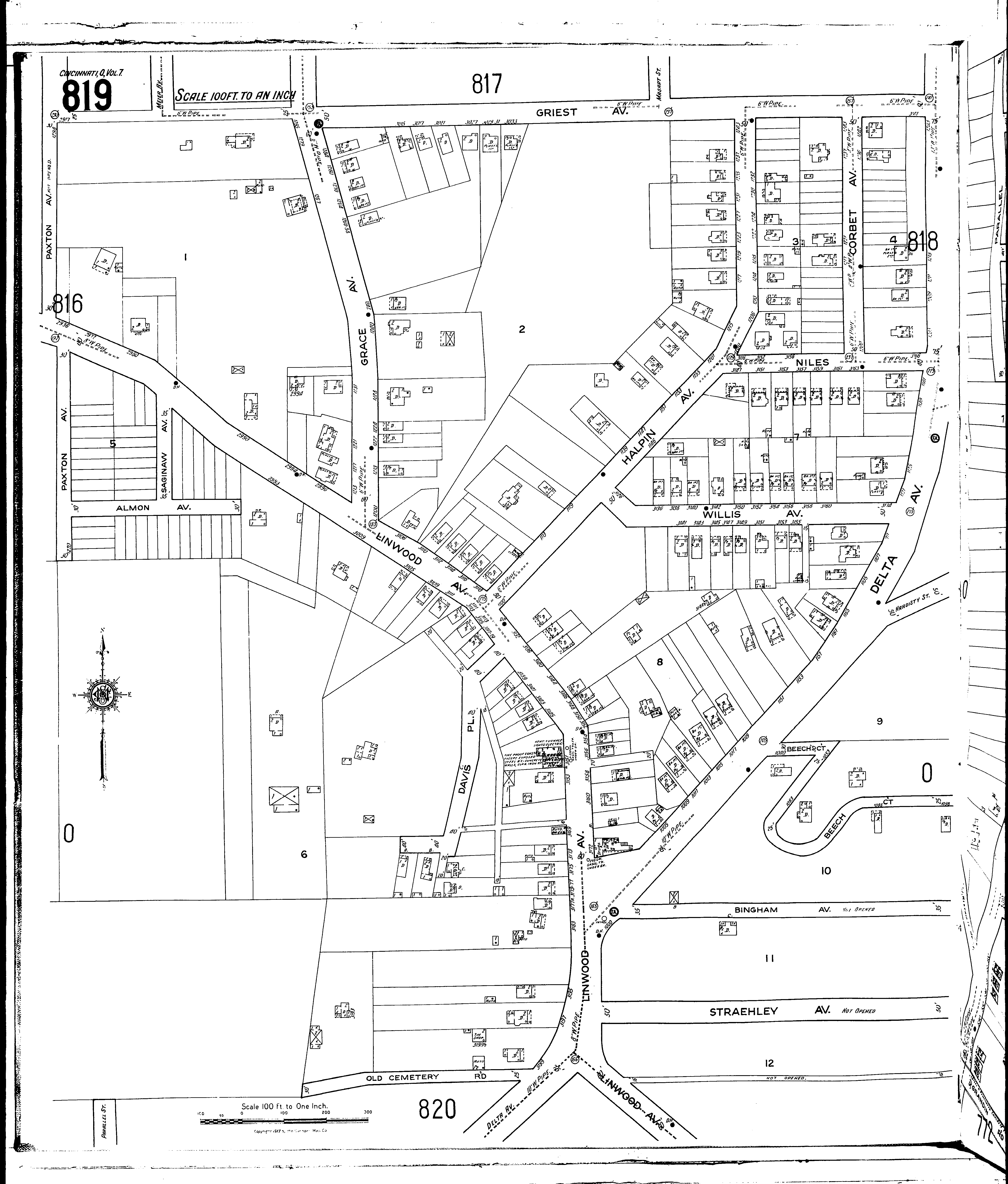
Map of Mt. Lookout in 1917

Mount Lookout is one of the 52 neighborhoods of Cincinnati. It is located northwest of Linwood, overlooking the Ohio River valley. The population was 5,173 at the 2020 census.

== History ==
The area now known as Mount Lookout was originally named "Delta", a small village. It was annexed by the city of Cincinnati in 1870.

The Cincinnati Observatory moved to the neighborhood in 1873 from its original location in Mount Adams, in order to escape the increasing light pollution of downtown Cincinnati. The neighborhood was subsequently named "Mount Lookout" for the observatory looking out over Cincinnati.

== Demographics ==
As of the census of 2020, there were 5,173 people living in the neighborhood. There were 2,292 housing units. The racial makeup of the neighborhood was 91.3% White, 1.6% Black or African American, 0.1% Native American, 1.7% Asian, 0.0% Pacific Islander, 0.6% from some other race, and 4.7% from two or more races. 3.1% of the population were Hispanic or Latino of any race.

There were 2,266 households, out of which 62.8% were families. 30.8% of all households were made up of individuals.

22.8% of the neighborhood's population were under the age of 18, 62.9% were 18 to 64, and 14.3% were 65 years of age or older. 47.0% of the population were male and 53.0% were female.

According to the U.S. Census American Community Survey for the period 2016–2020, the estimated median annual income for a household in the neighborhood was $129,922. About 1.5% of family households were living below the poverty line. About 80.6% of adults had a bachelor's degree or higher.

== Parks ==
Mount Lookout is home to Alms Park and Ault Park.

== Education ==
Kilgour School, Cardinal Pacelli School and St. Ursula Villa School are the only schools located within the community.
