= Krohn Conservatory =

Conservatory in Eden Park within Cincinnati, Ohio, United States

Coordinates: 39.11524°N 84.49040°W

Krohn Conservatory at Eden Park
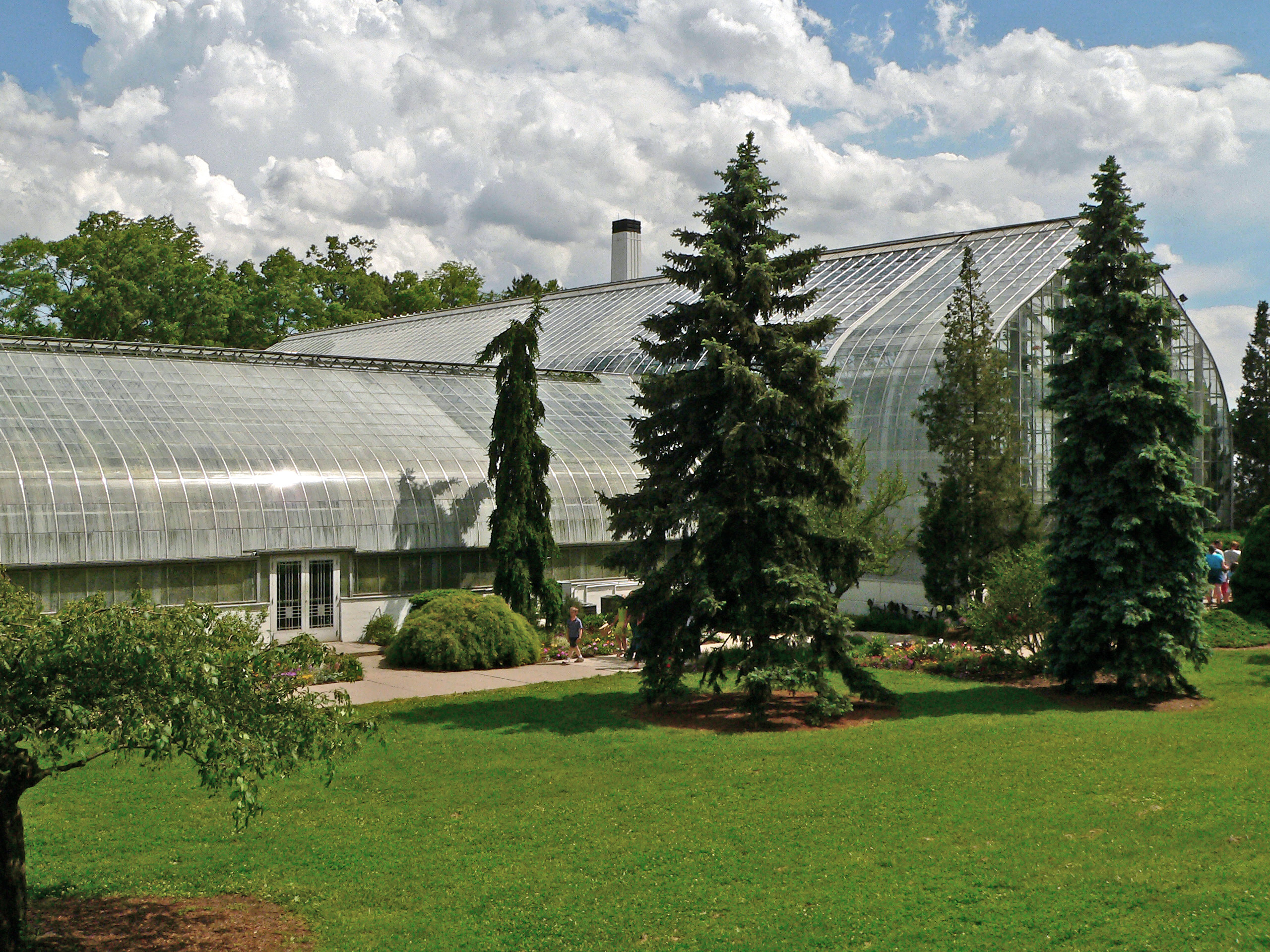
- Krohn Conservatory in Eden Park
- Interactive map of Krohn Conservatory at Eden Park
- Type: Conservatory
- Created: 1933
- Operator: City of Cincinnati Park Board
- Visitors: 200,000
- Species: 3,500
- Website: Official website

The Irwin M. Krohn Conservatory is a conservatory located in Eden Park within Cincinnati, Ohio in the United States.

== History ==
The conservatory was completed in 1933, replacing smaller greenhouses that had stood in Eden Park since 1894. Originally known only as the Eden Park Greenhouse, in 1937 it was renamed in honor of Irwin M. Krohn, who served as Board of Park Commissioner from 1912 to 1948. The architect firm Rapp & Meacham designed the conservatory in the Art Deco style, in the form of a Gothic arch.

A 1966 hailstorm caused extensive damage to the conservatory, and the firm of Lord & Burnham was called to restore it. The original wooden sashes were replaced with durable aluminum.

== Collection ==
It contains more than 3,500 plant species from all over the world, with principal collections as follows:

- Bonsai Collection - a collection of bonsai trees from the conservatory itself, the Bonsai Society of Greater Cincinnati, and private individuals.
- Desert Garden - succulents and cacti including agaves, aloes, crassulas, and yuccas, as well as Cereus, Opuntia, and Pereskia.
- Floral Display - home to six seasonal floral shows, with a permanent citrus tree collection of orange, kumquat, giant Ponderosa lemon, and grapefruit.
- Orchid Display - approximately 75 blooming orchids at any time, from the conservatory's collection of thousands of orchids encompassing 17 genera. This display also includes a Monstera deliciosa.
- Palm House - a 45-foot (14 m) high central house with palm trees, rubber trees, and bananas, shrubby plants, and ground cover, as well as a 20-foot (6.1 m) waterfall with a goldfish stream. Epiphytic bromeliads, orchids, and ferns grow in many of the trees.
- Tropical House - a large variety of ferns, both terrestrial and epiphytic; cycad, bromeliad, and begonia collections; and important economic plants including a cacao tree, Pomegranate, vanilla vine, and dwarf banana.

== Private events and weddings ==
Krohn Conservatory can be rented for private events and is an excellent setting for a small to mid-sized wedding. Accommodations can be made for the wedding ceremony to take place in the atrium of the conservatory, and there are multiple options for where to hold the reception, which include in the room off the atrium (seats up to 120 guests), or in the tent connected to the conservatory (seats up to 150 guests). Wedding guests have full access to the conservatory during the entire reception to take advantage of the numerous exhibits, such as the Orchid exhibit or the butterfly show. Information about renting the facility can be obtained through the Premier Park Events website.

== In popular culture ==
The conservatory was featured in the 1993 film Airborne.

== Gallery ==
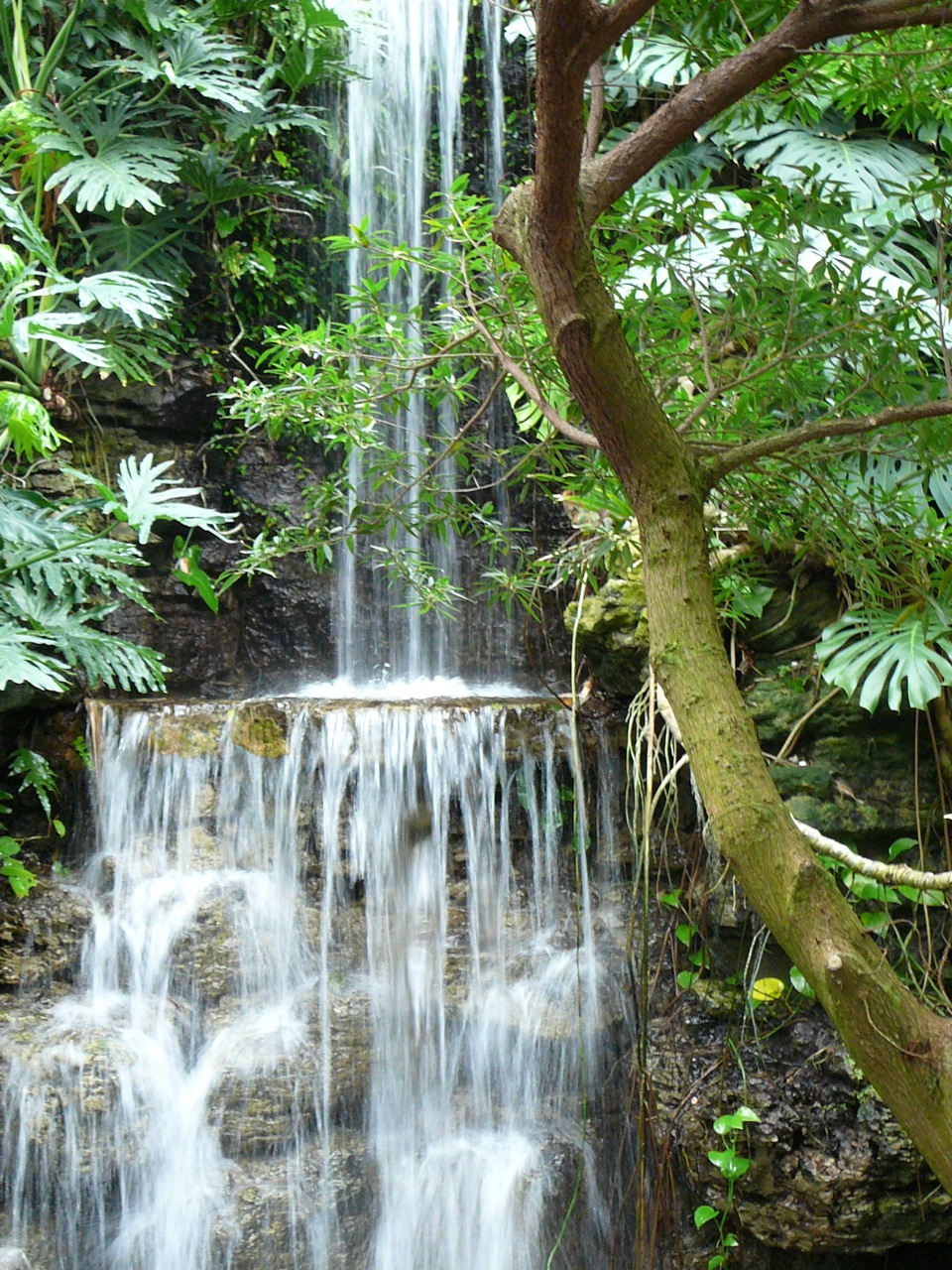
Waterfall

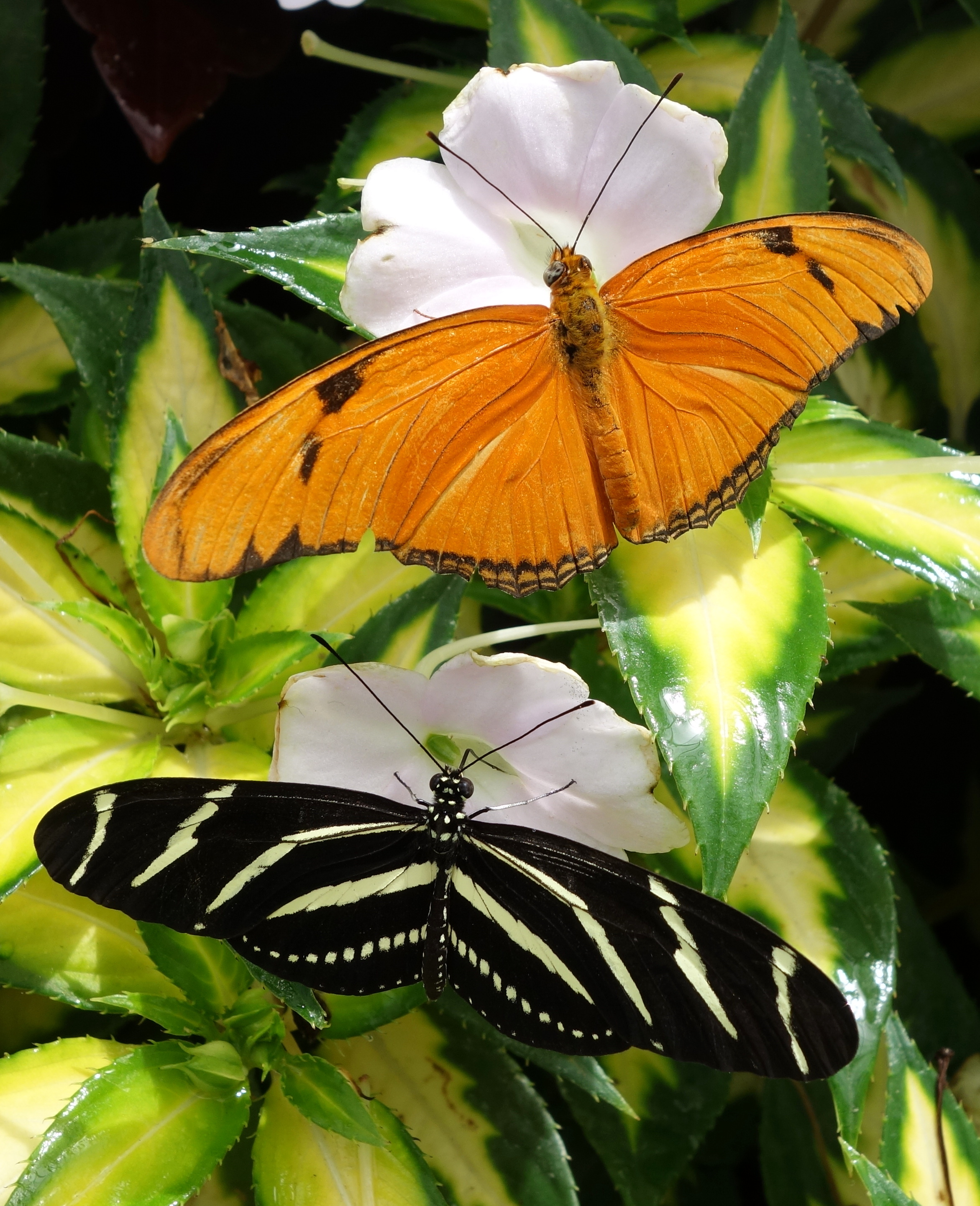
At the butterfly show.

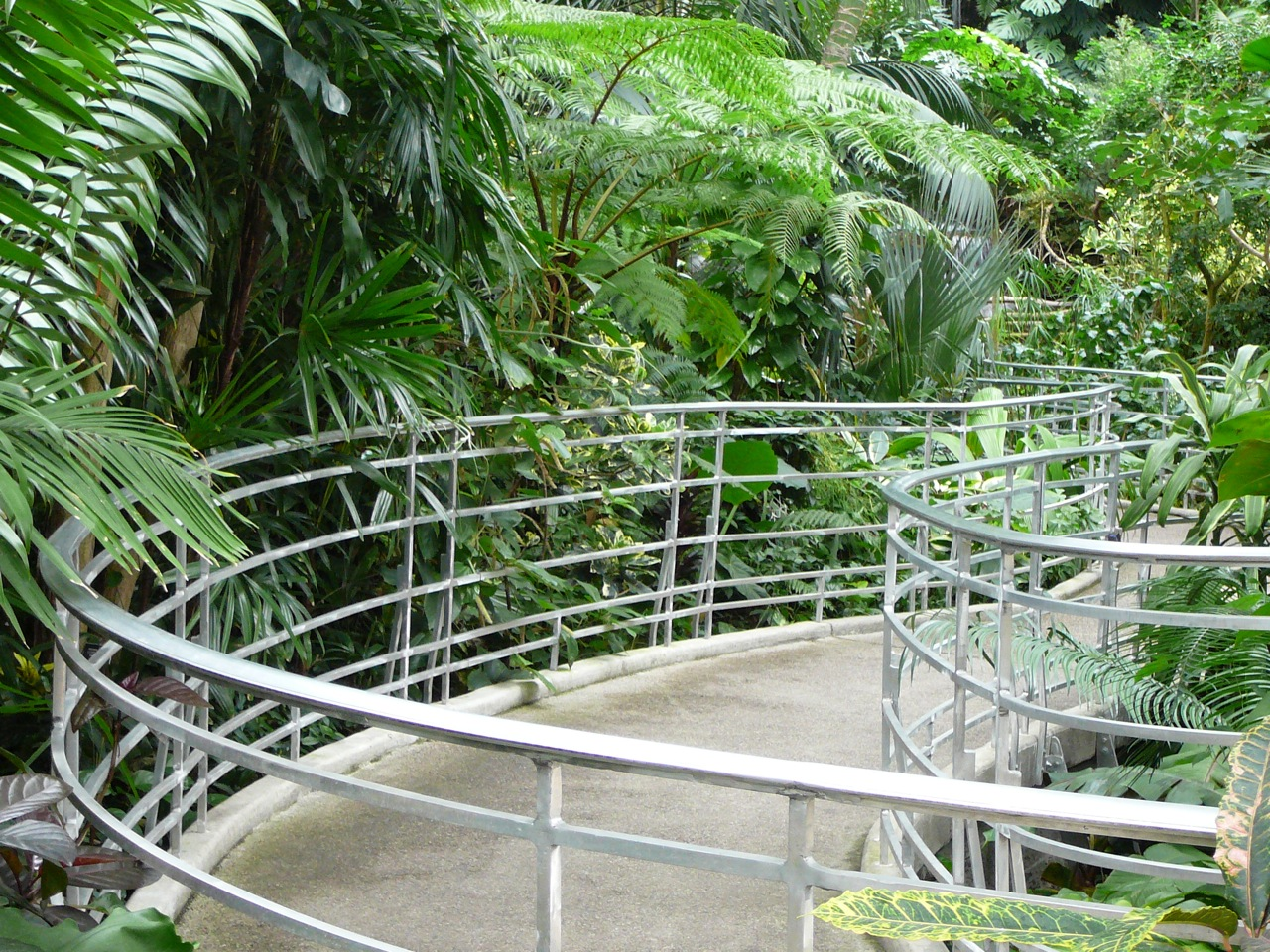
Palm House

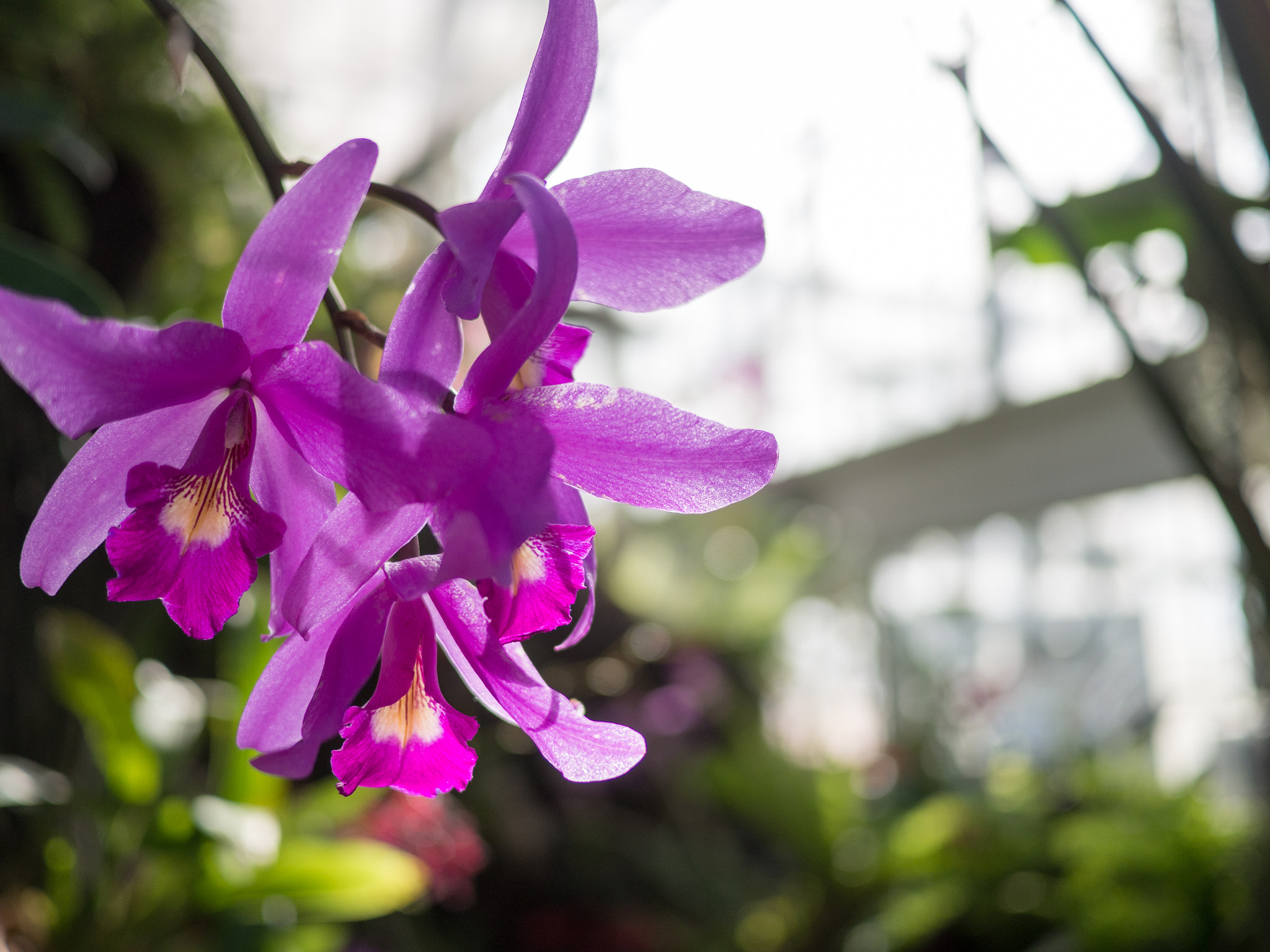
Close-up of a flower.

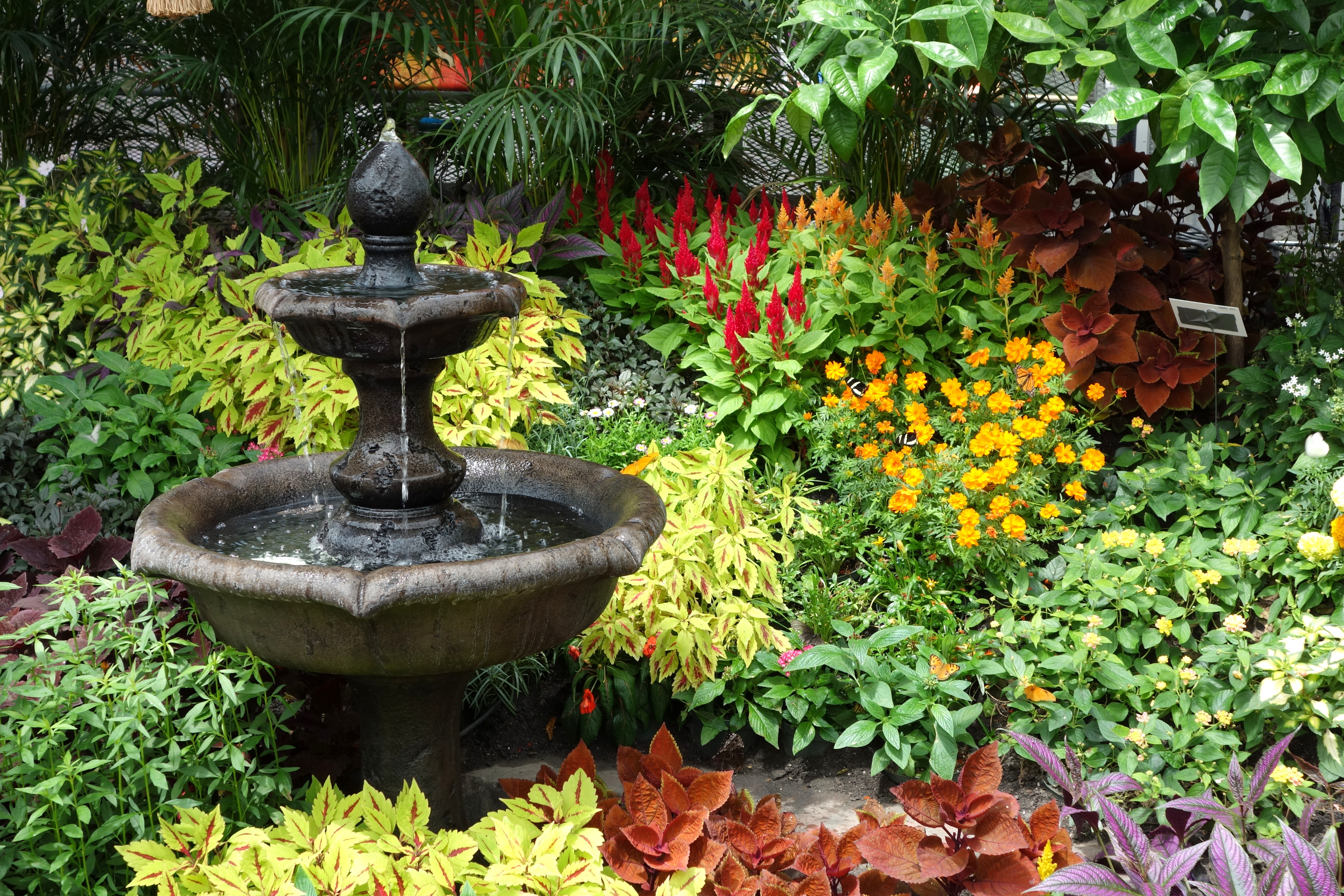
A flower display.
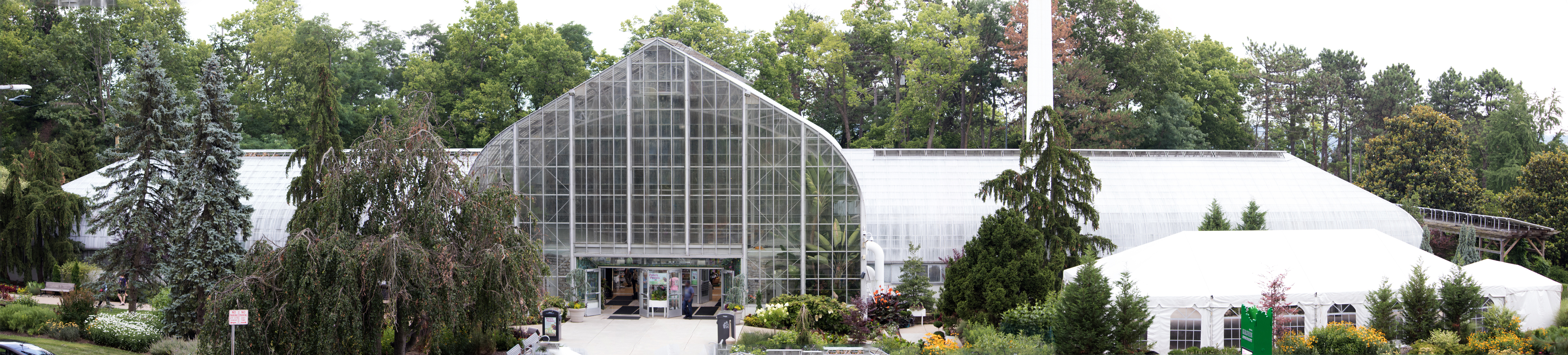
Exterior panorama.

== See also ==
- List of botanical gardens in the United States
