= Otto Armleder Memorial Park =

Park in Cincinnati, Ohio, United States

- Interactive map of Otto Armleder Memorial Park
- Type: Public
- Location: Cincinnati, Ohio
- Coordinates: 39°7′23″N 84°24′13″W
- Area: 305 acres (123 ha)

Otto Armleder Memorial Park is a public park located in Cincinnati, Ohio, United States. The park is located in the Linwood neighborhood of the city, and is managed by both the Great Parks of Hamilton County and Cincinnati Recreation Commission. It is named after Otto Armleder, a Cincinnati-born businessman in the horse carriage and automotive industries.

Otto Armleder Memorial Park is over 300 acres large, and features a dog park, a paved 1.1 mile trail with a connection to the Lunken Airfield loop, a playground, soccer fields, and canoe access to the Little Miami River.

The park is prone to flooding, and the trail connection to the Lunken Airfield loop closes when the Ohio River is at 38 feet, while the entire park closes when it is at 42 feet or above.
