= Parkers Woods and Buttercup Valley Nature Preserve =

Coordinates: 39°10′15″N 84°32′05″W

Parker Woods
- Parker Woods, Cincinnati, Ohio
- Interactive map of Parker Woods
- Type: Nature preserve
- Location: Cincinnati, Hamilton County, Ohio
- Operator: Western Wildlife Corridor

Parkers Woods and Buttercup Valley Nature Preserve

Located in the Northside neighborhood of Cincinnati, Ohio, Parkers Woods and Buttercup Valley Nature Preserve form a contiguous green space of approximately 89 acres connected by natural hiking trails. The two are part of the City of Cincinnati Parks system.

The main entrance to Parkers Woods is at the intersection of Haight and Bruce Avenues with additional trail heads on Crawford Ave. near Dane and at the east end of Thompson Heights Dr. The first parcel of land for the park, 27.5 acres, was sold to the City of Cincinnati in 1911 for $41,233.50 by Margaret Parker and her children. Another parcel was added in 1953. Parkers Woods is named for Alexander Langland Parker.

Buttercup Valley was donated to the Cincinnati Park Board in 1973 by the Greater Cincinnati Tree Council. The park entrance is located at the east end of Stanford Drive with additional trail heads at the east end of Northview Ave. and north end of Langland St.

In 2011 trail markers connecting the Crawford Ave. trail head of Parkers Woods with the Stanford Ave. trail head of Buttercup Valley were installed and several bridges replaced. In 2010, earthen stairs were refurbished.
