= Saint Francis De Sales Catholic Church (Cincinnati, Ohio) =

Historic church in Ohio, United States

- St. Francis De Sales Church Historic District
- U.S. National Register of Historic Places
- U.S. Historic district
- Cincinnati Local Historic Landmark
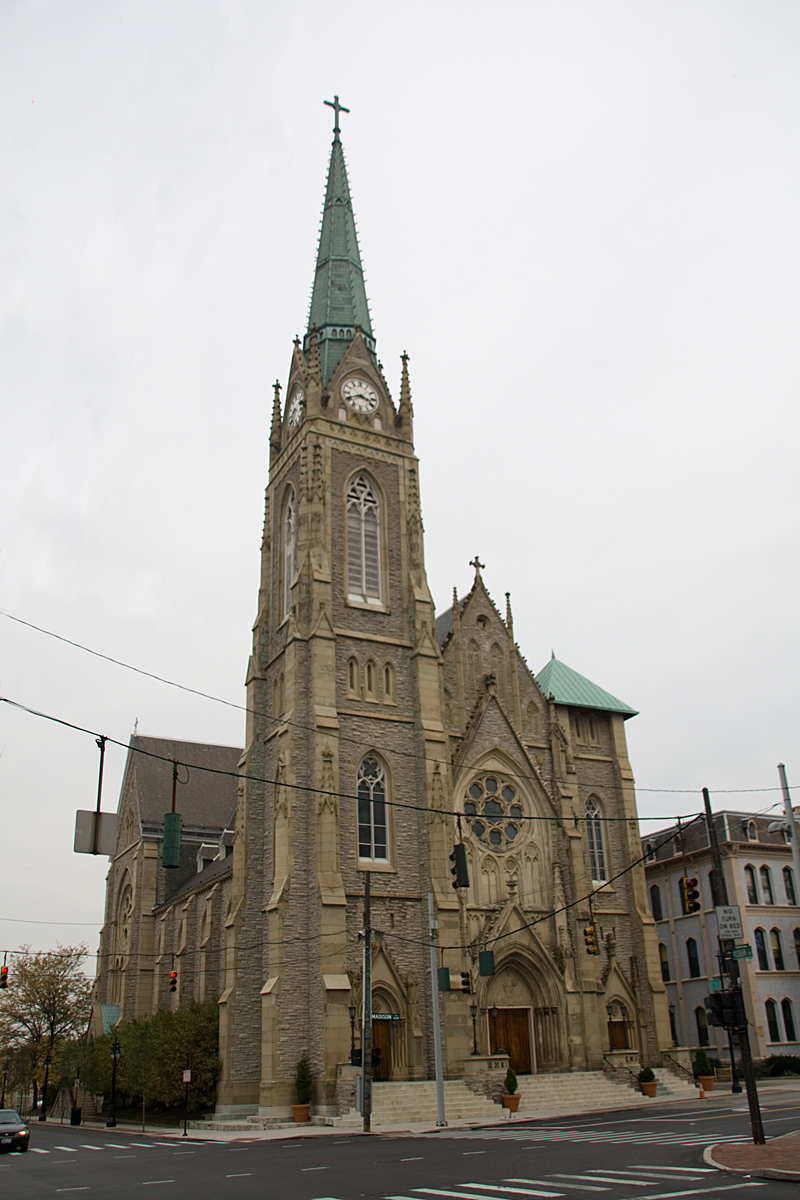
- Front of the church

- Location within Ohio Location within the United States
- Location: Woodburn Ave. and Madison Rd., Cincinnati, Ohio
- Coordinates: 39°7′48″N 84°28′35″W
- Area: 18 acres (73,000 m^{2})
- Built: 1879
- Architect: Francis G. Himpler
- Architectural style: Gothic Revival
- NRHP reference No.: 74001512
- Added to NRHP: March 1, 1974

Saint Francis De Sales Catholic Church is located at 2900 Woodburn Avenue in the East Walnut Hills neighborhood of Cincinnati, Ohio, United States.

The congregation was organized in 1849, and its first building was dedicated on November 3, 1850. The parish patron is Saint Francis de Sales. The cornerstone was laid June 30, 1878, by Archbishop John Baptist Purcell, in the presence of nearly 10,000 persons. The edifice was dedicated December 20, 1879. The interior contains one of the finest altars in the United States, costing $20,000. The parent parishes were St. Mary's Church in Over-the-Rhine and St. Paul Church in Pendleton. The original congregation was mostly German.

The main altar at St. Francis de Sales was consecrated by Archbishop W.H. Elder on April 27, 1887. It was a gift of Joseph Kleine and his wife Agnes Kleine, and was sculpted by Fred and Henry Schroeder of Cincinnati from designs by A. Kloster of New York. The altar of pure white Rutland marble and the white marble floor cost $20,000. The altar's onyx pillars and delicate Gothic spires are flanked by statues of SS. Joseph and Agnes in honor of the donors' patron saints.

The church is home to Joseph, a.k.a. "Big Joe", which is the largest swinging bell ever cast in the United States. VanDuzen Company (formerly Buckeye Bell Foundry) at Second and Broadway downtown. The bell measures 9 by 7 feet (2.7 m × 2.1 m) in diameter and height respectively; it weighs 35,000 pounds (16,000 kg), including a 640 pounds (290 kg) clapper. Named for the parishioner whose donation to the bell fund was the largest, the bell reputedly could be heard 15 miles (24 km) away when first rung, rattling nearby buildings and loosening stone & mortar. It was soon decided to immobilize the bell, and for more than a century "Big Joe" has relied on a foot hammer striking its rim.

In early 1974, the church, its parish school, and its rectory were declared a historic district, the "St. Francis De Sales Church Historic District", and listed on the National Register of Historic Places.
