= Bettman Preserve =

Coordinates: 39.137725°N 84.460532°W

The Bettman Preserve, owned and operated by the Cincinnati Park Board, is a city park in the neighborhoods of Evanston and Hyde Park in Cincinnati, Ohio on Beech Lane. The preserve contains several acres of woodland, and the Bettman Natural Resource Center is home to the city park board's nature education program and library archives. The park was donated in 1977 to the city by Mrs. Arthur M. Bettman, and dedicated to her late husband, a local business leader.
