= Cincinnati Park Board =

The Cincinnati Park Board (officially the Cincinnati Board of Park Commissioners) maintains and operates all city parks in Cincinnati, Ohio. Established in 1911 with the purchase of 168 acres (0.68 km^{2}), today the board services more than 5,000 acres (20 km^{2}) of city park space. The board receives its funding from the city, state and federal grants, as well as private endowments. In 1932 the Cincinnati Zoo was purchased by the city and placed under the management of the board.

== See also ==
- List of parks in Cincinnati
- Great Parks of Hamilton County
- Anderson Township Park District
