= Our Lady of the Holy Spirit Center =

Catholic retreat center in Ohio, U.S.

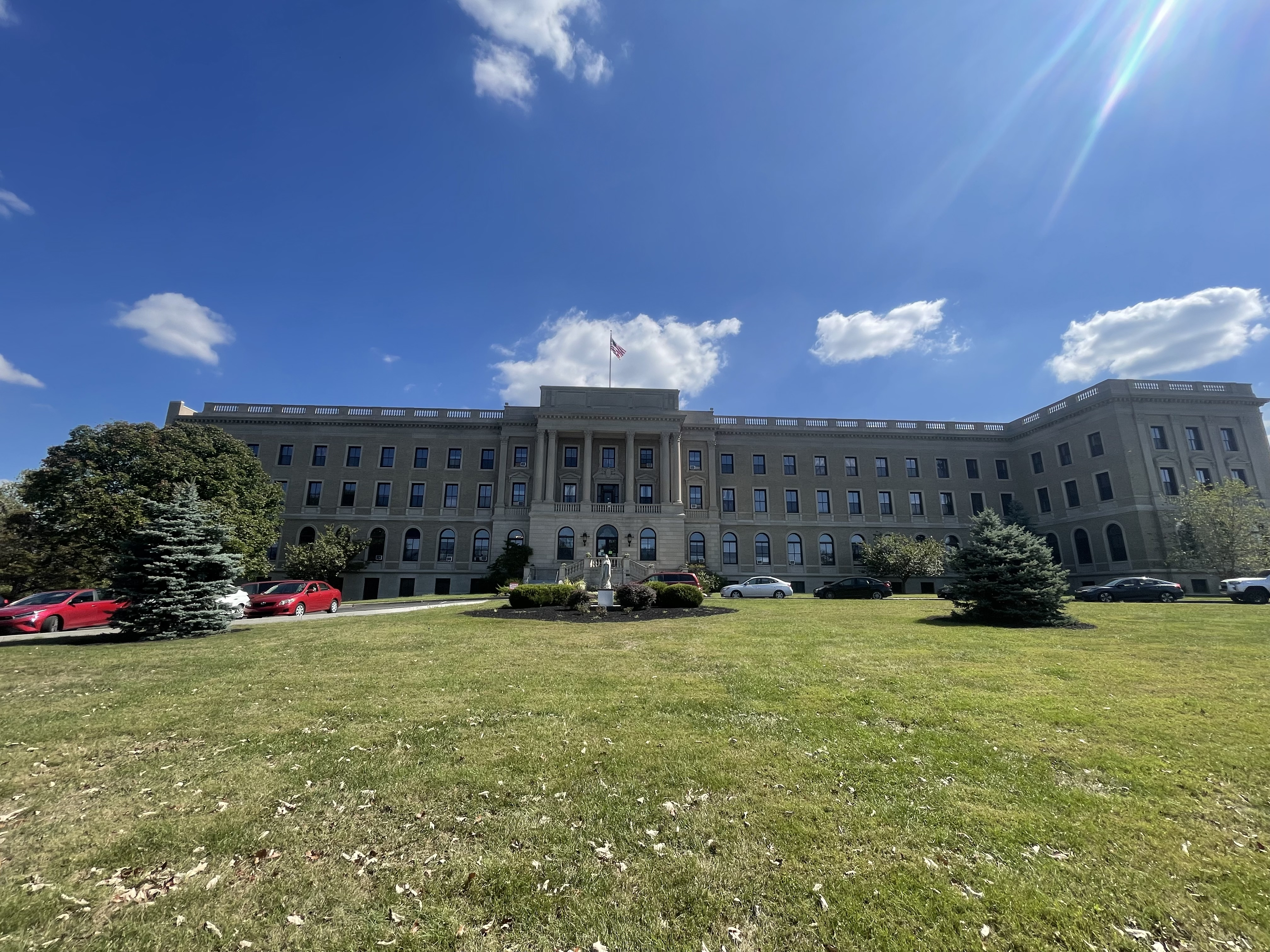
- Our Lady of the Holy Spirit Center
- 39°10′23″N 84°26′49″W
- Address: 5440 Moeller Avenue, Norwood, Ohio, US
- Denomination: Catholic
- Website: https://olhsc.org

History
- Former name: Mount Saint Mary's Seminary of the West
- Founded: 1993
- Founder(s): Fr. Richard Wilhelm; Fr. Leroy Smith
- Earlier dedication: October 23, 1923

Architecture
- Style: Italian Renaissance

Specifications
- Length: 253 ft (77 m)
- Width: 354 ft (108 m)

Our Lady of the Holy Spirit Center, or simply the Holy Spirit Center, is a Catholic retreat center located in Norwood, near Cincinnati, Ohio, United States. The Italian Renaissance main building was completed in 1923 to house Mt. St. Mary's Seminary, the major seminary of the Archdiocese of Cincinnati and part of the Athenaeum of Ohio. Also on the site is a 1911 mansion constructed to serve as the residence of the Archbishop of Cincinnati. Due to declining enrollment and buildings falling into disrepair, Mt. St. Mary's moved to the campus of St. Gregory Seminary in 1981. The campus sat vacant for over a decade before being purchased by Fr. Richard Wilhelm in 1992.

== History ==
=== Norwood Heights Company and acquisition of property ===
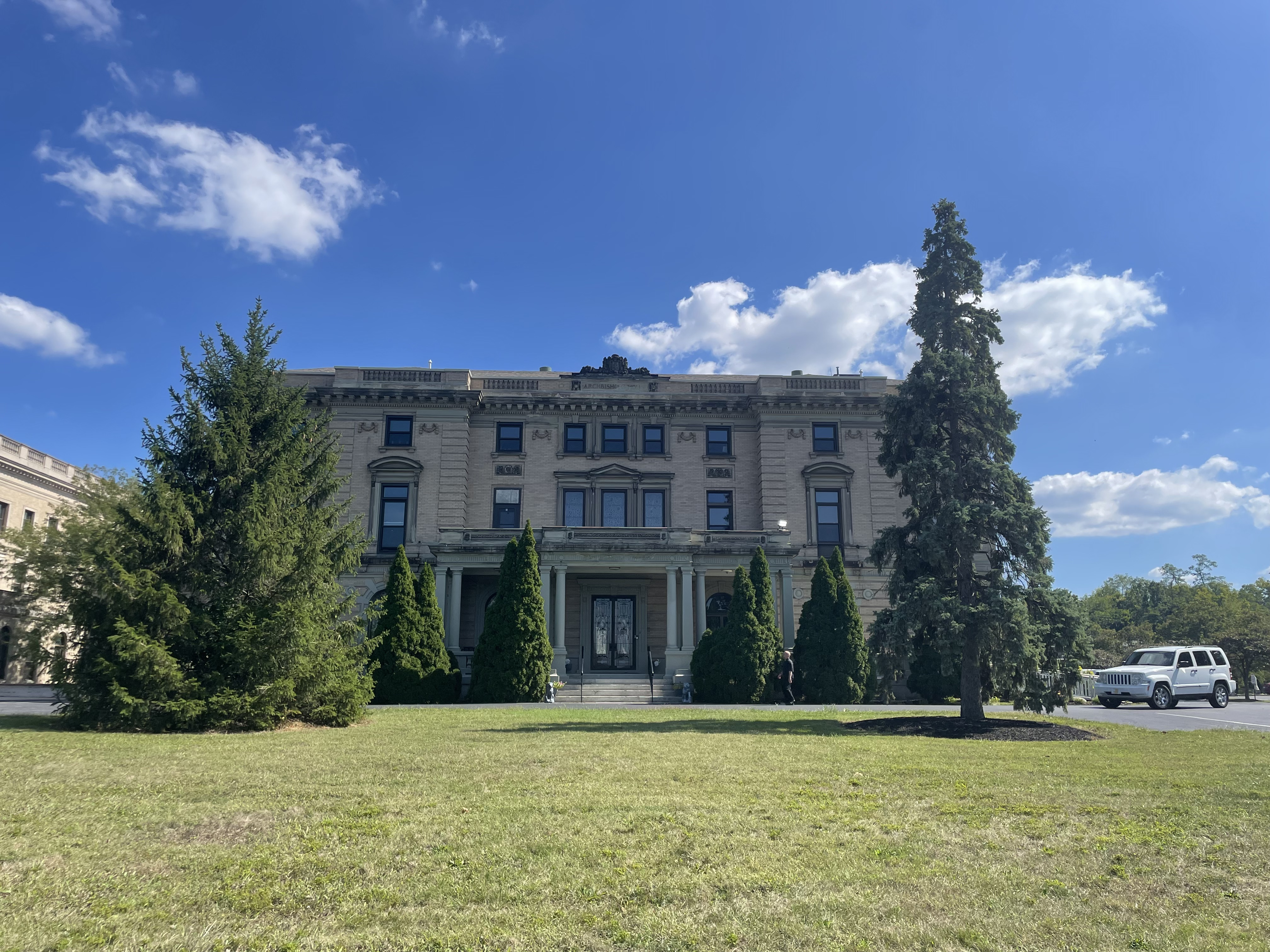
The Archbishop's Mansion at the Holy Spirit Center was completed in 1911.

The land on which the Holy Spirit Center sits was originally purchased by the Norwood Heights Company, a real estate development corporation owned by Henry Moeller along with a group of Catholic priests and laymen, in July 1906. Moeller intended to create a Catholic residential community in the area, and to relocate the episcopal residence, the diocesan cathedral, and the diocesan seminary to the neighborhood. Construction on a new bishop's mansion in the Italian Renaissance style, housing a chapel, guest rooms, and 16 bathrooms, concluded by 1911. That same year, the property hosted the closing ceremonies of the 5th National Eucharistic Congress.

However, prohibitions within canon law against the building of a diocesan cathedral outside of the titular city, along with a depressed real estate market and allegations of directors of the corporation speculating for personal gain led to the movement of the cathedral never occurring and the delaying of the construction of the new seminary building until 1917, when bidding for contractors was opened. In 1918, building was again postponed due to the outbreak of World War I.

=== Construction of seminary building ===
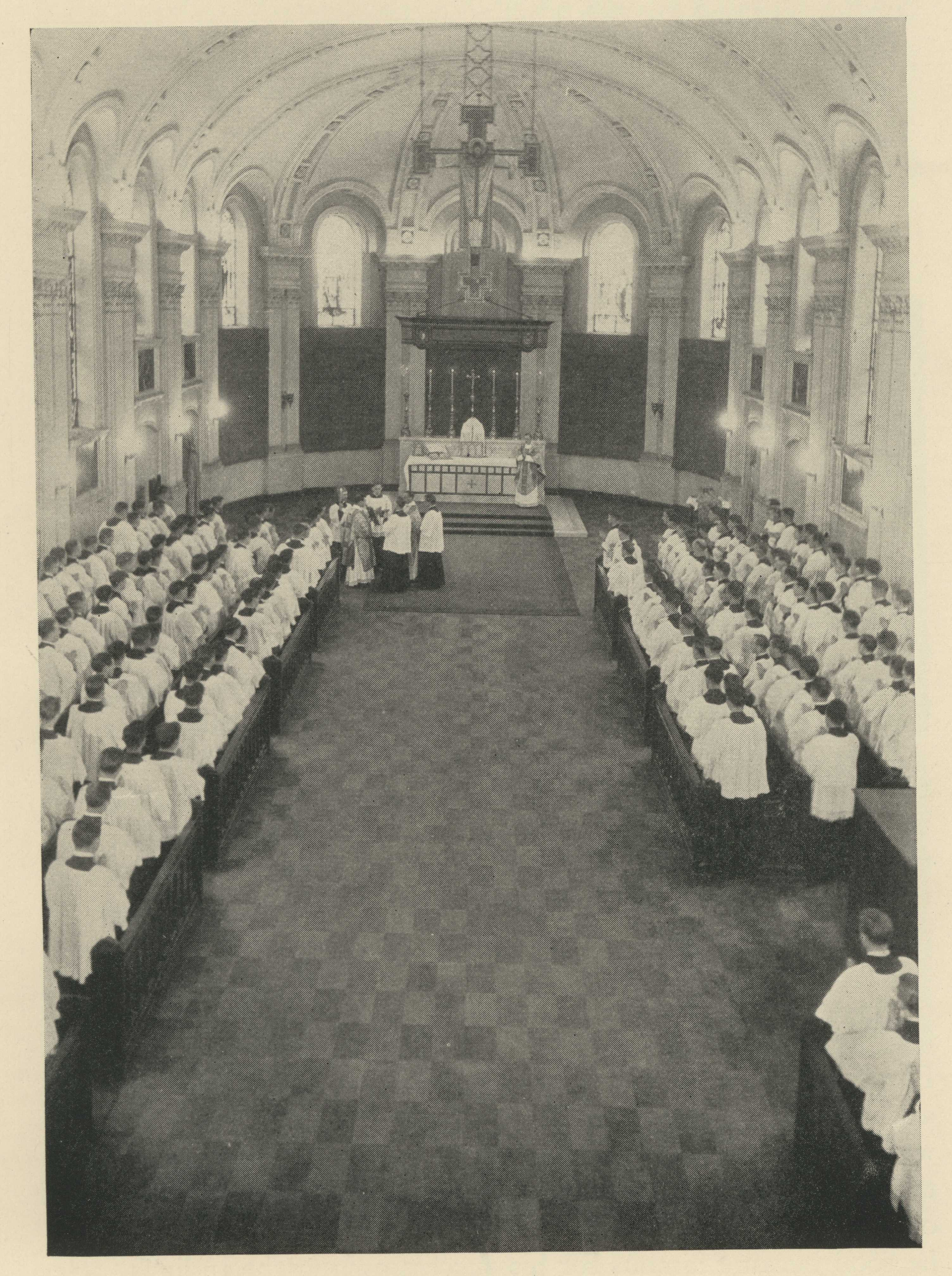
Seminarians praying in the chapel at Mt. St. Mary's in 1929.

It was not until June 1, 1921, that Moeller broke ground on the seminary building. The cornerstone was laid on March 16 of the following year. By the beginning of classes in 1923, the four classes of major seminarians studying graduate-level theology transferred from the campus of St. Gregory Seminary to the completed Norwood complex, allowing for the reestablishment of the minor seminary formerly housed at that location from 1890 to 1907.

On October 23, Pietro Fumasoni Biondi, the Apostolic delegate to the United States, solemnly dedicated the new three-story grey brick building, constructed in the same style as the episcopal residence. Situated on 16 acres, it boasted 300 rooms as well as chapel, basketball court, and pistol range. The seminary chapel initially was simple in its ornamentation, with red curtains and a crucifix of Christ the High Priest hanging above the altar. It also was the site of a Mass celebrated by Cardinal Eugenio Pacelli, the future Pope Pius XII, during his 1936 visit to the United States.

In 1947, the mansion on the property began to house the Teachers College of the Athenaeum of Ohio as well as the Office of Parochial Schools for the Cincinnati Archdiocese following John T. McNicholas' move of his personal residence to the historic Peter G. Thomson House. The Teachers College had been housed in the high school building of St. George Church prior, and operated out of the mansion until its closure in the early 1950s.

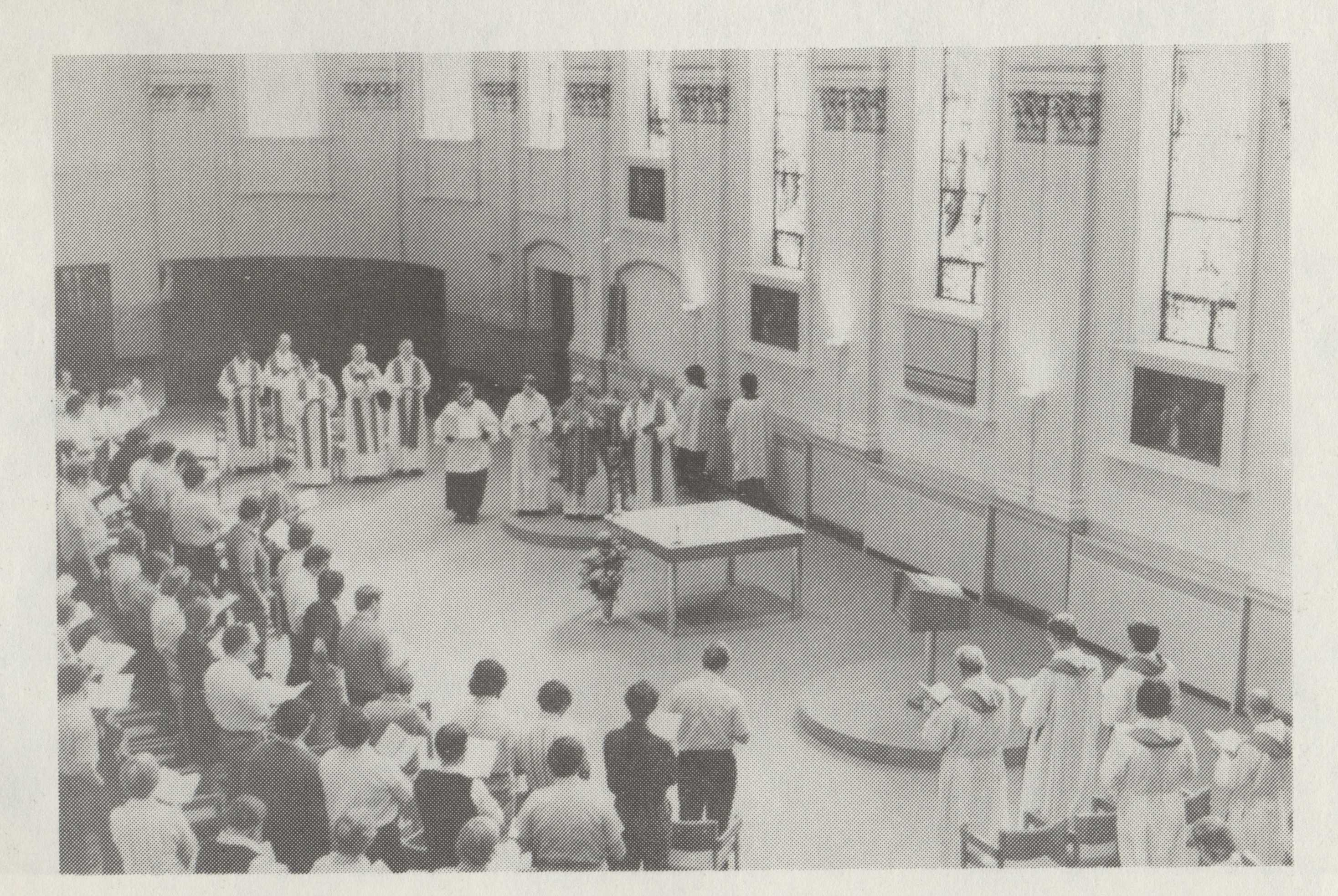
The chapel at Mt. St. Mary's following the 1974 renovations.

In 1951, significant cosmetic additions were made to the chapel in a baroque style, along with the addition of painted biblical scenes and symbols of the titles of the Litany of Loreto. Following the reforms of the Second Vatican Council, major alterations were made to the chapel in 1975, with chairs replacing pews, allowing for multiple different arrangements of the chapel. The Marian symbols on the ceiling were also covered up.

=== Closure, sale, and founding of the Holy Spirit Center ===
Enrollment at Mt. St. Mary began to decline in the 1970s. This, paired with the 1923 building requiring $1 million in repairs due to deferred maintenance, lead to the Norwood campus being listed for sale for $3 million and its move back to the St. Gregory site, which had become vacant the previous year. Propositions for alternate uses for the now-closed building included a nursing home and an office building for the state of Ohio.

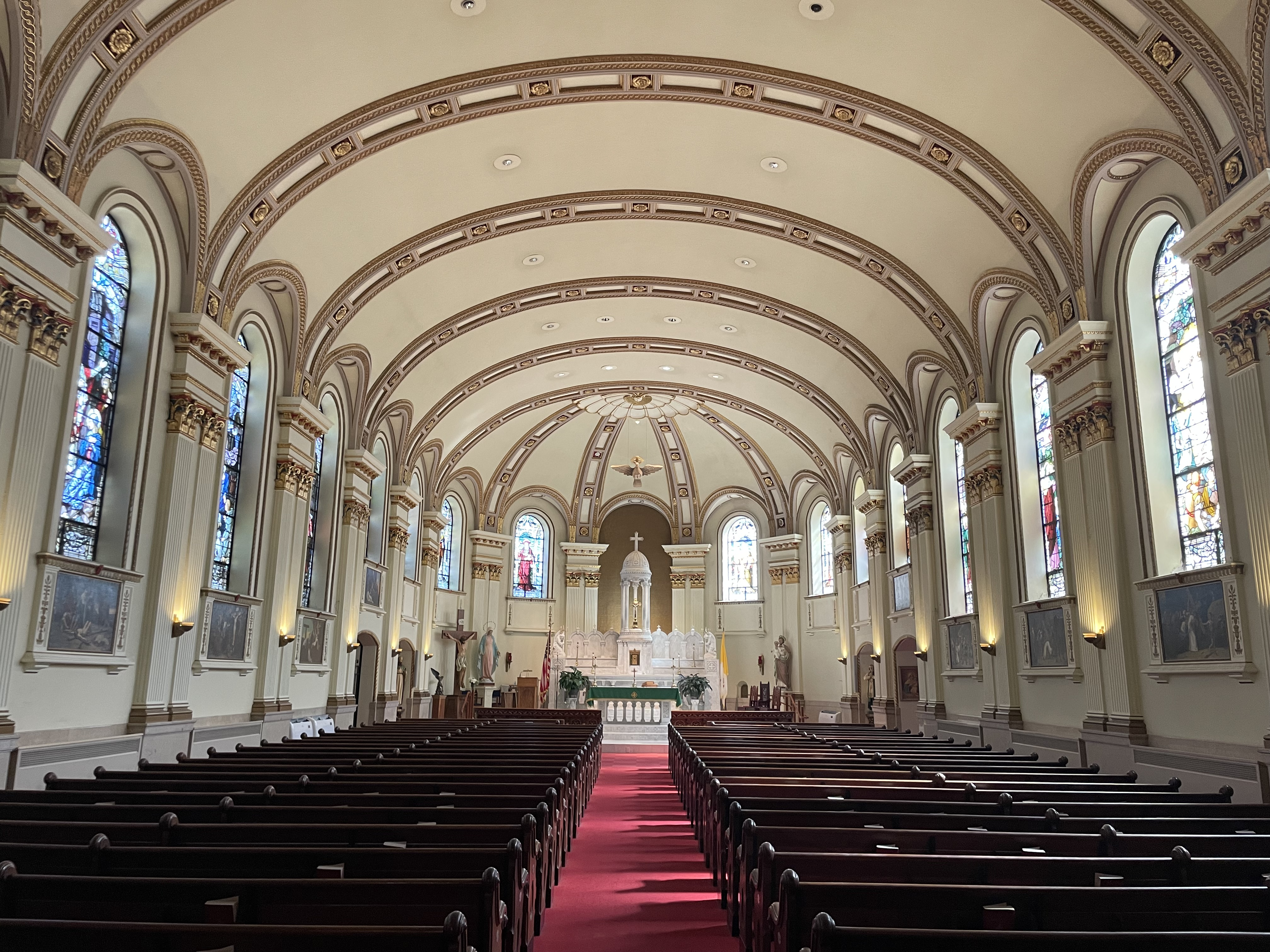
The chapel at the Holy Spirit Center following the renovations of the mid-1990s.

In 1992, a retired priest named Richard Wilhelm purchased the still-listed facility for $100,000 to serve as a home for a fellowship of retired priests, calling it the Monk's Retreat Center. The property had undergone water damage and the roof needed over $16,000 in repairs, leading Wilhelm to offer up an original propeller signed by Wilbur Wright for sale to fundraise for repairs. Two years after its purchase, the western wing of the building, damaged by water freezing inside the walls, collapsed.

The leadership of the center embarked on a $2 million fundraising campaign, and the damage from the collapse was repaired by 1995. The campus, now called the Our Lady of the Holy Spirit Center, also installed new pews in the chapel, as well as an altar from the recently-closed Holy Cross Church in the Mount Adams neighborhood of Cincinnati. The chapel hosted Vietnamese-language Masses for recently-arrived refugees until the community moved to St. Aloysius Church in the Elmwood neighborhood of Cincinnati. The campus housed the offices and studios of Sacred Heart Radio AM 740 following the purchase of the WNOP rights from a jazz station in 2000, the same year that a chapel at the center began hosting perpetual Eucharistic adoration. In 2017 the north wing of the center became the motherhouse of a women's semi-contemplative religious community, the Children of Mary, as the group had outgrown other facilities in Columbus and Newark.

=== Our Lady of Light ===
Beginning in 1992, an anonymous person allegedly began having visions of the Virgin Mary at St. Joseph Church in Cold Spring, Kentucky, where Fr. Leroy Smith was pastor. Later that same year, Smith retired from his pastorate and became vice-president of the Holy Spirit Center. Visions continued at St. Joseph the two following years, drawing more onlookers, and in 1994, Our Lady of Light Ministries was established at the Holy Spirit Center. In 1995, the visionary said that the visions would move to the Holy Spirit Center, and the retreat house hosted thousands of pilgrims every August 31. Some theorized that the apparent visions came from camera flash. Reports of the visions ceased in the early 2000s.
