= Pendleton, Cincinnati =

Coordinates: 39°06′37″N 84°30′31″W

Pendleton
- Neighborhood of Cincinnati
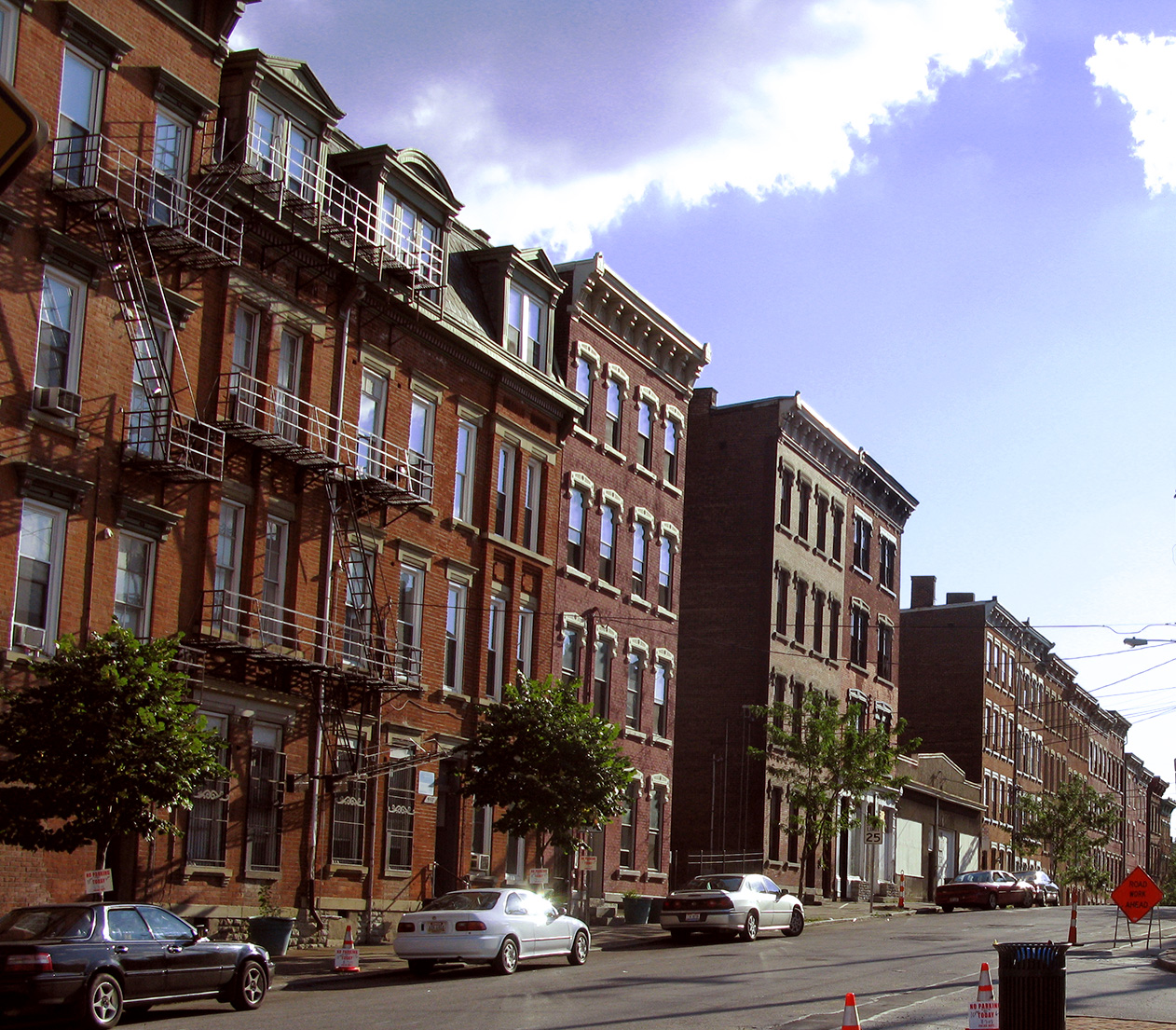
- Pendleton townhouses.

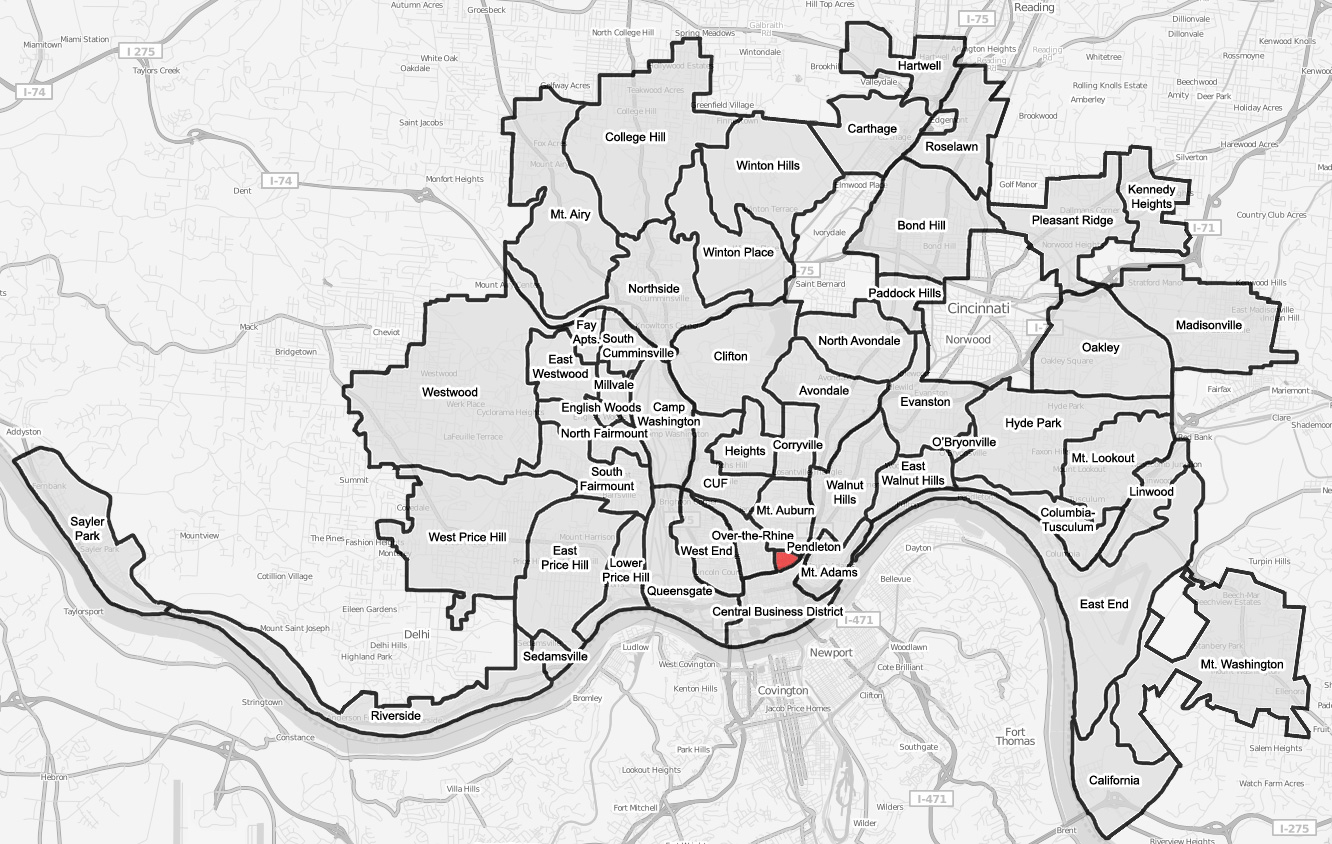
- Pendleton (red) within Cincinnati, Ohio.
- Country: United States
- State: Ohio
- City: Cincinnati

Population (2020)
  - Total: 1,088
- Time zone: UTC-5 (EST)
  - Summer (DST): UTC-4 (EDT)
- ZIP code: 45202

Pendleton is one of the 52 neighborhoods of Cincinnati, Ohio. It is located within the city's urban basin. The population was 1,088 as of the 2020 census.

The neighborhood is sometimes referred to as the "Pendleton Art District" of Over-the-Rhine because of its small size, but Pendleton and Over-the-Rhine are officially two separate neighborhoods in District 1 of the City of Cincinnati.

== History ==
The neighborhood was named after George H. Pendleton (1825–1889), a U.S. Representative and Senator whose house still stands in the area.

== Geography ==
Pendleton is located on the east side of Over-the-Rhine, north of the Central Business District, and south of Mount Auburn. The triangle-shaped boundaries of the neighborhood are Liberty Street, Reading Road/Central Parkway, and Sycamore Street.

The neighborhood is considered part of the Over-the-Rhine Historic District by the City of Cincinnati and the Over-the-Rhine Chamber of Commerce.

== Demographics ==
Population of Pendleton 1860-2020
Year	Pop.	±%
1860	9,057	—
1870	9,885	+9.1%
1880	12,488	+26.3%
1890	8,619	−31.0%
1900	4,975	−42.3%
1910	4,200	−15.6%
1920	5,925	+41.1%
1930	5,178	−12.6%
1940	5,076	−2.0%
1950	5,591	+10.1%
1960	4,840	−13.4%
1970	1,971	−59.3%
1980	1,708	−13.3%
1990	1,206	−29.4%
2000	1,141	−5.4%
2010	900	−21.1%
2020	1,088	+20.9%
Wards were utilized from 1860-1890 which have slightly different boundaries from census tracts utilized from 1900-40.

As of the census of 2020, there were 1,088 people living in the neighborhood. There were 668 housing units. The racial makeup of the neighborhood was 54.3% White, 39.3% Black or African American, 0.4% Native American, 1.4% Asian, 0.0% Pacific Islander, 0.1% from some other race, and 4.5% from two or more races. 1.8% of the population were Hispanic or Latino of any race.

There were 476 households, out of which 36.6% were families. 40.5% of all households were made up of individuals.

20.0% of the neighborhood's population were under the age of 18, 76.1% were 18 to 64, and 3.9% were 65 years of age or older. 51.2% of the population were male and 48.8% were female.

According to the U.S. Census American Community Survey, for the period 2016-2020 the estimated median annual income for a household in the neighborhood was $66,786. About 25.9% of family households were living below the poverty line. About 68.5% of adults had a bachelor's degree or higher.

== Gallery ==
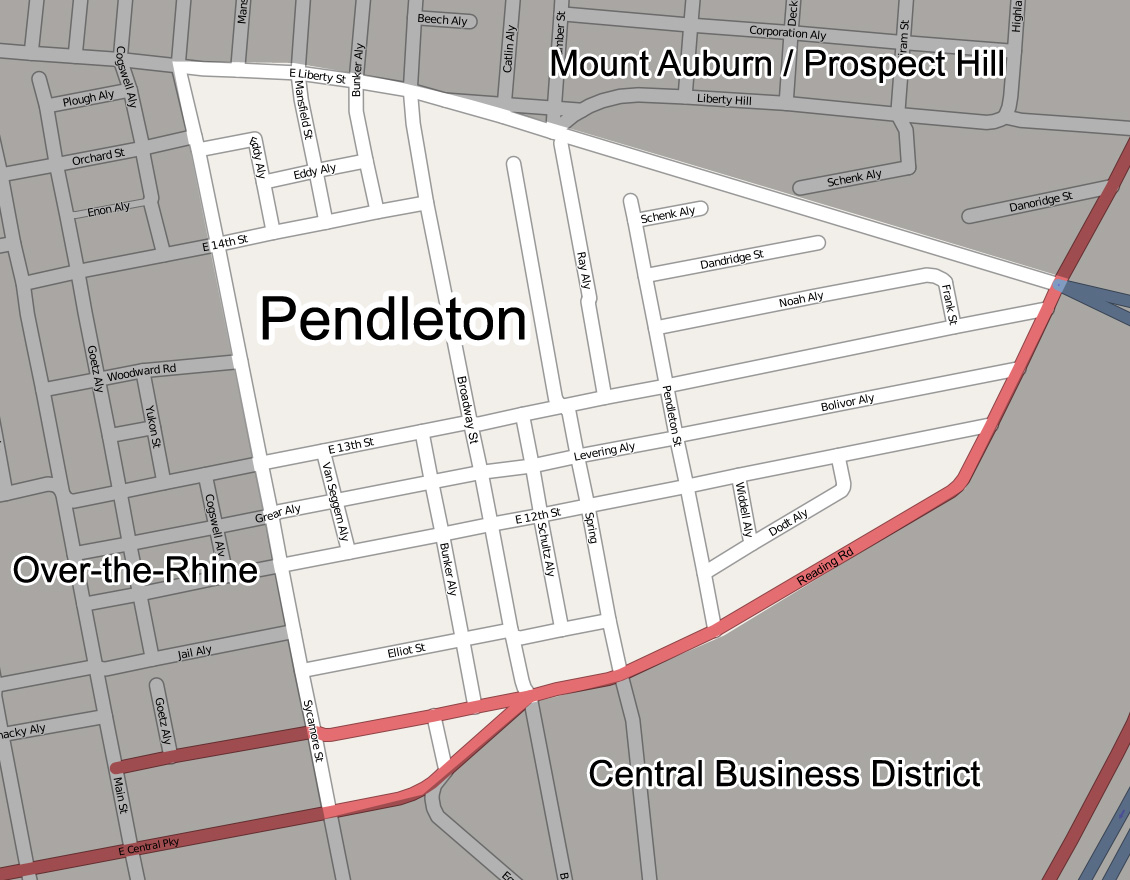
Neighborhood map

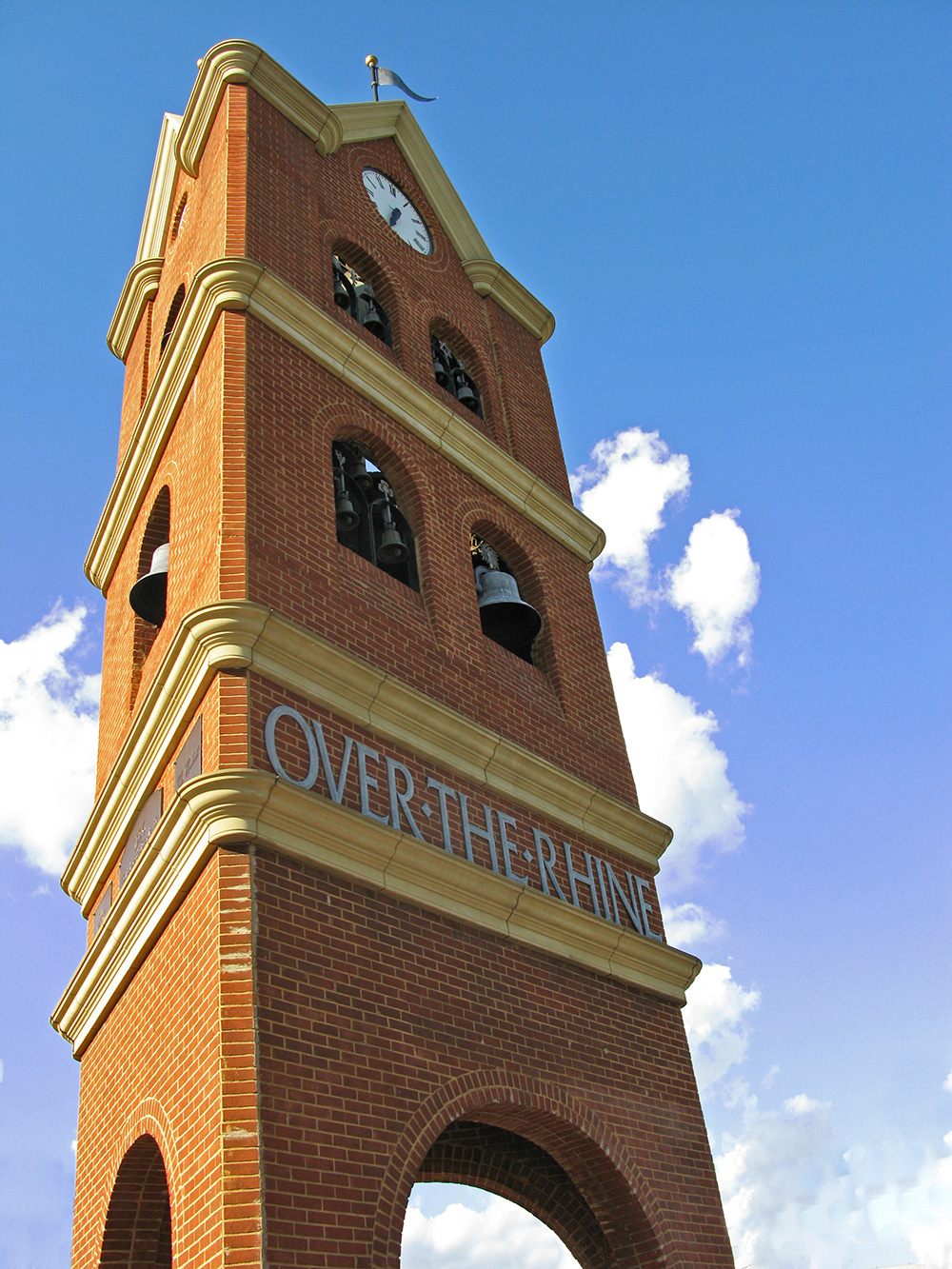
The Over-the-Rhine clock tower is actually in Pendleton
