= Prospect Hill, Cincinnati =

- Prospect Hill Historic District
- U.S. National Register of Historic Places
- Cincinnati Local Historic Landmark
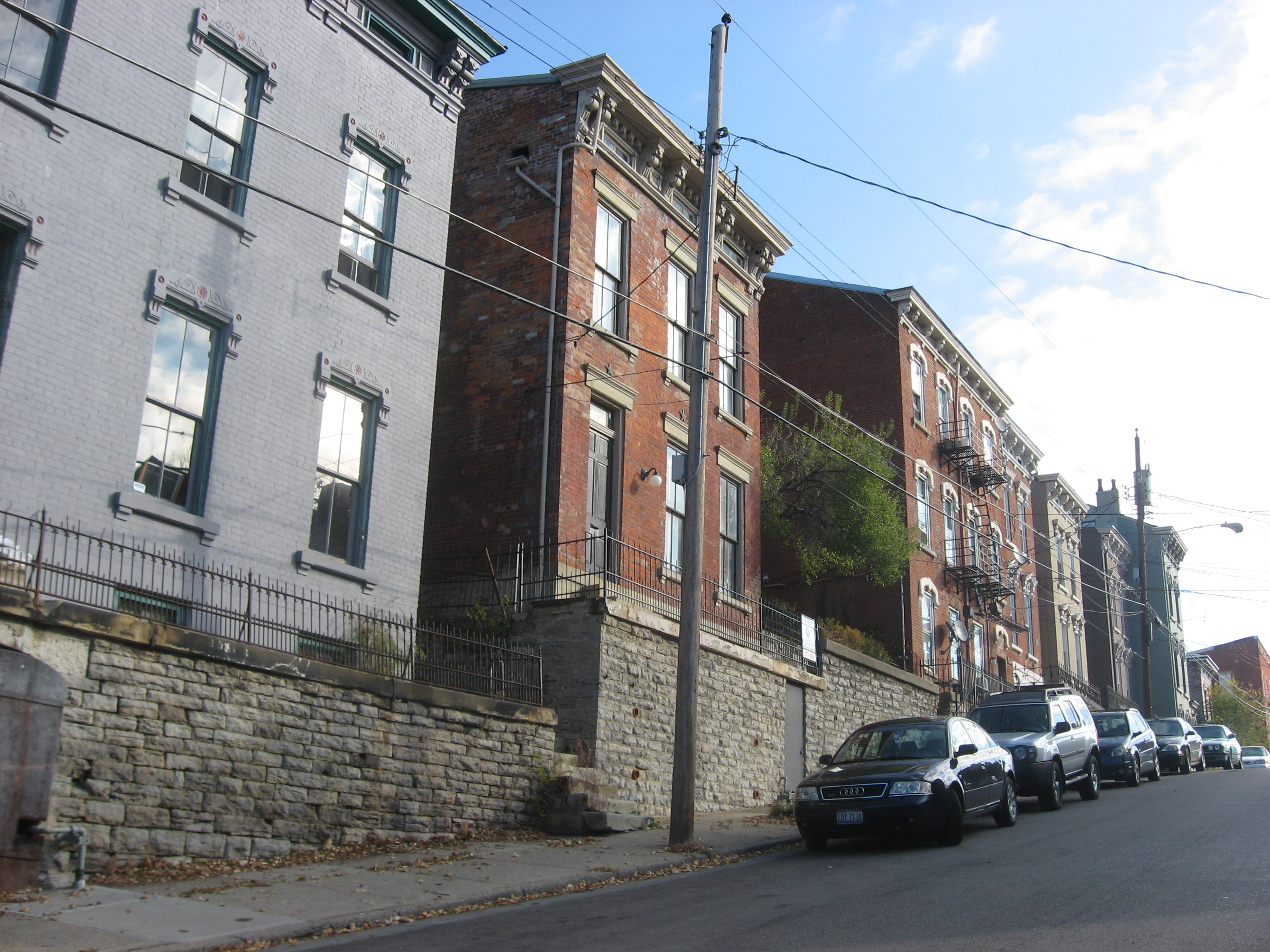
- Houses on Milton Street in the district

- Location within Ohio Location within the United States
- Location: Roughly bounded by Liberty Hill, Highland, Pueblo, Channing, and Sycamore Sts., Cincinnati, Ohio
- Coordinates: 39°6′48″N 84°30′23″W
- Architect: multiple
- Architectural style: Greek Revival, Italianate, Queen Anne
- NRHP reference No.: 80003078
- Added to NRHP: September 4, 1980

Prospect Hill Historic District is located on a hillside outside of downtown Cincinnati, Ohio, United States. It is part of the Mount Auburn neighborhood of Cincinnati. Prospect Hill is bounded by the following streets, Liberty, Sycamore, Boal and Highland. Prospect Hill is sometimes called locally "Liberty Hill".

The District is bordered to the north by the Mount Auburn Historic District and the Pendleton neighborhood of Over-the-Rhine to the south.

== Architecture ==
The majority of buildings are brick, and the predominant architectural style is Italianate. Dating from the 1860-80 period, this style is characterized by bracketed cornices and round or segmental arched window details. Good examples of earlier Greek Revival style architecture constructed between 1835 and 1860 are also found, predominantly located on the lower streets which developed the earliest. This style utilizes classical details and geometric, symmetrical forms. Examples of the Queen Anne style, which displays a variety of contrasting materials and decorative surface treatments, and the French Second Empire style, which is characterized by a Mansard roof whose slope actually forms part of the front facade, may also be found scattered throughout the district. These styles date from the turn of the century.

Contributing to the distinct character of Prospect Hill are the street steps, which evolved in response to a hillside environment which did not lend itself to a linear grid plan. Where the terrain was too steep to build roads, stairways and "paper" streets developed. The streets that were built often cut sharply into the hillside, requiring retaining walls along lot fronts. Many of these retaining walls, which are primarily stone, support original iron fences and contribute to the character of the district. Open space between lots reflect the fact that the land was too irregular for construction purposes.

== History ==
The majority of early settlers were veterans of the American Revolutionary War. One of the earliest residents of the hill was Dr. Daniel Drake. He lived in a log cabin while his new home was being built on Third Street.

Senator George H. Pendleton also had a house prominently located at 559 Liberty Hill.
