= List of Cincinnati Local Historic Landmarks =

Local list of historic sites in the Cincinnati, Ohio

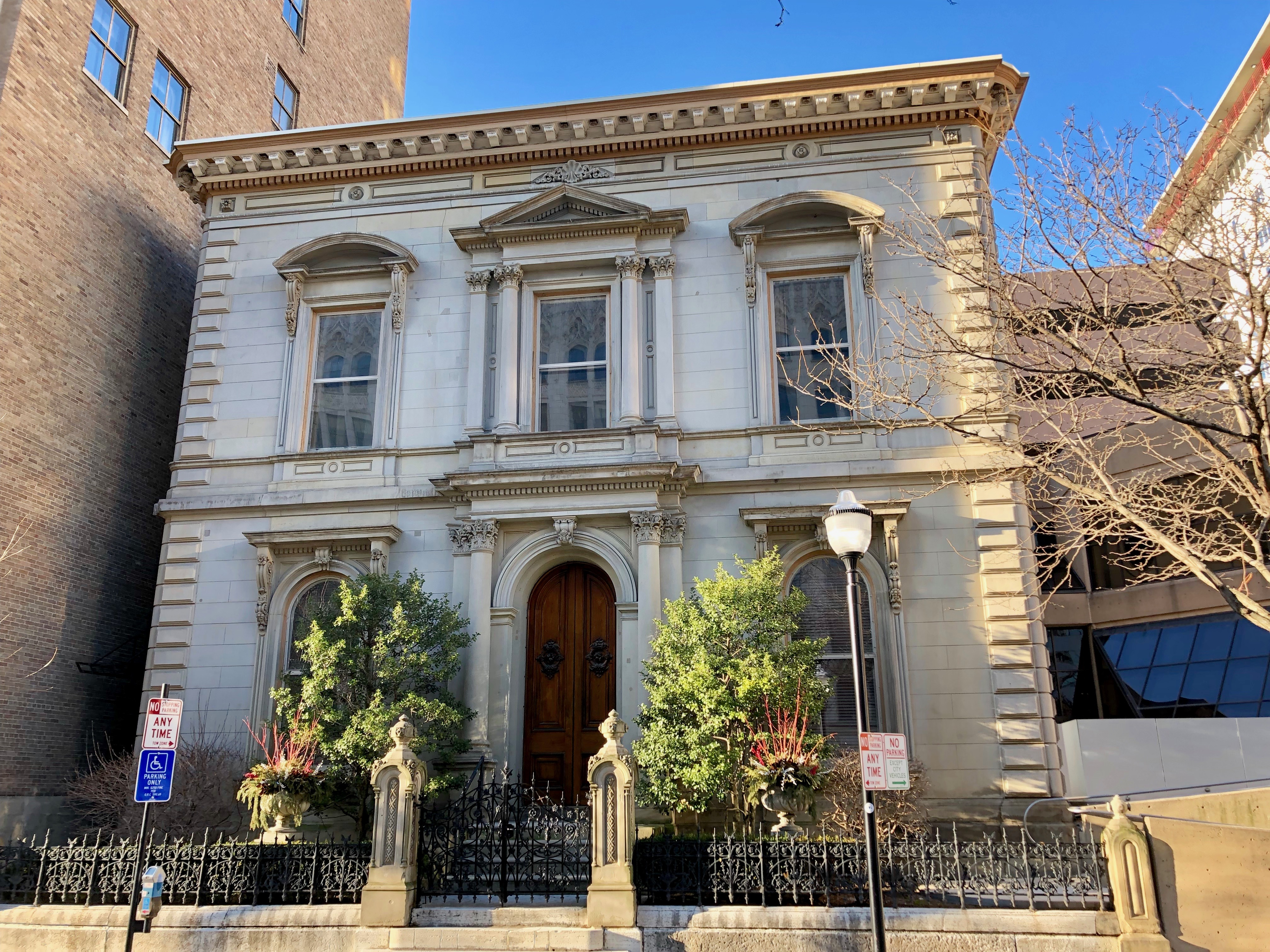
The Cuvier Press Club Building was one of the first properties designated as a Local Historic Landmark in 1973

Local Historic Landmark is a designation for historic sites in Cincinnati, Ohio, United States, overseen by the Cincinnati City Council. As of 2022, there are 52 designated Local Historic Landmarks, located across the city.

The Cincinnati Historic Conservation Board supervises properties designated as Local Historic Landmarks, and regulates changes such as additions, alterations, and demolitions. Many of the sites designated as Local Historic Landmarks are also listed on the National Register of Historic Places, providing federal tax support for preservation. Some are further designated National Historic Landmarks, providing additional federal oversight.

== Criteria ==
The Cincinnati City Council's Historic Conservation Board decides a building's historic significance. The structure must have at least one of the following attributes, as stated in the Cincinnati Municipal Code:

- Association with events that have made a significant contribution to the broad patterns of our history; or
- Association with the lives of persons significant in our past; or
- Embodies the distinctive characteristics of a type, period, method of construction or that represent a significant and distinguishable entity whose components may lack individual distinction; or
- That has yielded, or may be likely to yield, information important in prehistory or history.

Structures that would not be given landmark designations, as stated in the Cincinnati Municipal Code, include:

- A cemetery, birthplace, grave of a historical figure or a property owned by religious institutions or used for religious purposes, unless it is a religious property deriving primary significance from architectural or artistic distinction or historical importance; or
- A structure that has been moved from its original location, is a reconstructed historic structure, is a property primarily commemorative in nature or a property that has been erected within the past 50 years, unless the structure or property is an integral part of a district that meets the above criteria or falls within one or more of the following categories:

- A structure removed from its original location but that is significant primarily for architectural value or that is the surviving structure most importantly associated with a historic person or event; or
- A birthplace or grave of a historical figure of outstanding importance if there is no other appropriate site or structure directly associated with the subject's productive life; or
- A cemetery that derives its primary significance from graves of persons of transcendent importance, from age, from distinctive design features, or from association with historic events; or
- A reconstructed structure when accurately executed in a suitable environment and presented in a dignified manner as part of a restoration master plan and when no other structure with the same association has survived; or
- A property primarily commemorative in intent if design, age, tradition or symbolic value has invested it with its own historical significance; or
- A property achieving significance within the past 50 years if it is of exceptional importance or is unique within the city.

== Application process ==
Historic districts, landmarks, and sites require filing of a designation application. This must be filed by the property owner or owner of a property in the area to be designated, or by the city council or its members, by the city council, city manager, city Urban Conservator, City Planning Commission, or by local preservation societies and community councils. After filing an application and during its nomination process, the site may not be demolished or evacuated.

Within 60 days of receiving the designation application, the city's Urban Conservator prepares and sends a report and guidelines for conservation to the city council's Historic Conservation Board. For historic districts, the Urban Conservator also sends a proposed boundary map, a list of all included structures, and a list of non-contributing structures.

The Historic Conservation Board schedules a public hearing to consider the landmark within 30 days of receiving the report and proposed guidelines. After the hearing, the board decides whether or not to recommend the designation, and forwards the decision and materials to the City Planning Commission. Within 30 days of the recommendation, the planning commission holds a public hearing to determine whether to follow the conservation board's recommendation. Afterward, the planning commission likewise forwards its decision and materials to the city council, which votes to ordain or overrule the planning commission's decision. If the planning commission approves of the designation, only a simple majority vote in the council is needed. However, if the planning commission does not approve of the designation, two-thirds of the council would need to vote in overruling the planning commission.

== List of landmarks ==
For consistency, the list below uses the name from the City of Cincinnati website.

=== Individual landmarks ===
| Local Historic Landmark | Image | Location | Neighborhood | Ordinance | Designation date | Construction date or period | NRHP date | NHL date |
|---|---|---|---|---|---|---|---|---|
| American Can Company | American Can Company | 4101 Spring Grove Ave. | Northside | 0309-2007 | August 1, 2007 | 1921 | October 17, 2007 | N/A |
| Baldwin Piano Building | Baldwin Piano Building | 655 Eden Park Dr. | Walnut Hills | 0028-2015 | February 11, 2015 | 1921 | February 23, 2016 | N/A |
| Benjamin Stewart Home | | 5540 Madison Rd. | Madisonville | 0054-2022 | February 2, 2022 | | May 29, 1975 (contributing property to the Madison–Stewart Historic District) | N/A |
| Ben Pitman House | Benn Pitman House | 1852 Columbia Pkwy. | East Walnut Hills | 0202-1974 | May 15, 1974 | | July 7, 1969 | N/A |
| Brunswick Balke Collender Building | Brunswick Balke Collender | 130-132 E 6th St. | CBD/Downtown | 0257-2016 | May 29, 2016 | | January 24, 2017 | N/A |
| Carthage Flagpole | Carthage Flagpole | 7011 Vine St. | Carthage | N/A | May 12, 1982 | | N/A | N/A |
| Cincinnati Athletic Club Building | Cincinnati Athletic Club | 111 Shillito Pl. | CBD/Downtown | 0248-1985 | May 30, 1985 | | February 17, 1983 | N/A |
| Cincinnati Bell Building | Cincinnati Bell | 209 W 7th St. | CBD/Downtown/West End | 0452-1985 | September 18, 1985 | | April 20, 1995 | N/A |
| Cincinnati City Hall | Cincinnati City Hall | 801 Plum St. | CBD/Downtown | 0199-1974 | May 28, 1974 | | December 11, 1972 | N/A |
| Cincinnati Union Terminal | Cincinnati Union Terminal | 1301 Western Ave. | Queensgate | 0079-1974 | March 6, 1974 | 1933 | October 31, 1972 | May 5, 1977 |
| Citadel Building | | 114-116 E 8th St. | CBD/Downtown | 0452-1985 | September 18, 1985 | | N/A | N/A |
| Court Street Fire Station | | 315 W Court St. | CBD/Downtown | 0452-1985 | September 18, 1985 | | | N/A |
| Covenant-First Presbyterian Church | | 717 Elm St. | CBD/Downtown | 0249-1975 | May 14, 1975 | | January 29, 1973 | N/A |
| Cuvier Press Club | | 22 Garfield Pl. | CBD/Downtown | 0216-1973 | May 16, 1973 | | October 26, 1972 | N/A |
| Doctor's Building | | 19 Garfield Pl. | CBD/Downtown | 0452-1985 | September 18, 1985 | | December 4, 1986 | N/A |
| Duttenhofer Building | | 299 E 6th St. | CBD/Downtown | 0021-2016 | January 27, 2016 | | December 26, 2017 | N/A |
| Farmers Hotel | | 4000 Colerain Ave. | Northside | 0260-2013 | August 7, 2013 | | N/A | N/A |
| First National Bank Building | | 105 E Fourth St. | CBD/Downtown | 0134-2016 | May 2, 2016 | | January 24, 2017 | N/A |
| George Pendleton House | | 559 Liberty Hill | Mount Auburn | 0201-1974 | May 15, 1974 | | October 15, 1966 | January 29, 1964 |
| Harriet Beecher Stowe House | | 2950 Gilbert Ave. | Walnut Hills | 0200-1974 | May 15, 1974 | | November 10, 1970 | N/A |
| Henry Probasco House | | 430 W Cliff Ln. | Clifton | 0215-1973 | May 16, 1973 | | November 9, 1972 | N/A |
| Holy Cross Monastery | | 1055 St. Paul Pl. | Mount Adams | 0443-1981 | October 14, 1981 | | September 13, 1978 | N/A |
| House of Adam | | 620-622 Vine St. | CBD/Downtown | 0314-2016 | September 28, 2016 | | N/A | N/A |
| King Records | | 1540 Brewster Ave. | Evanston | 0319-2015 | October 7, 2015 | | N/A | N/A |
| Kinsey Apartment Building | | 2415 Maplewood Rd. | Mount Auburn | 0066-2013 | March 27, 2013 | | N/A | N/A |
| Kirby Road School | | 1710 Bruce Ave. | Northside | 0044-2013 | April 10, 2013 | | September 3, 2013 | N/A |
| Krippendorf-Dittman Building | | 628 Sycamore St. | CBD/Downtown | 0452-1985 | September 18, 1985 | | March 3, 1980 | N/A |
| Laurel Court | | 5870 Belmont Ave. | College Hill | 0199-1979 | May 16, 1979 | | November 29, 1979 | N/A |
| Manse Hotel and Annex | | 926-1004 Chapel St. | Walnut Hills | 0005-2019 | January 9, 2019 | | August 8, 2019 | N/A |
| Masonic Temple | | 3301 Price Ave. | East Price Hill | 0257-2013 | July 11, 2013 | | N/A | N/A |
| Mercantile Library | | 414 Walnut St. | CBD/Downtown | 0054-2021 | February 18, 2021 | | September 20, 2021 | N/A |
| Moore-Knight House | Upload image | 716 Mt. Hope Ave. | East Price Hill | 0308-1994 | August 3, 1994 | | N/A | N/A |
| Mount Airy Water Towers | | 5421 Colerain Ave. | Mount Airy | 0001-2019 | January 9, 2019 | | N/A | N/A |
| Music Hall | | 1243 Elm St. | Over-the-Rhine | 0214-1973 | May 29, 1973 | 1878 | January 26, 1970 | December 2, 1974 |
| Plum Street Temple | | 720 Plum St. | CBD/Downtown/West End | 0250-1975 | May 14, 1975 | | December 27, 1972 | May 15, 1975 |
| Provident Bank Building | | 632 Vine St. | CBD/Downtown | 0452-1985 | September 18, 1985 | | September 6, 2018 | N/A |
| Reakirt Building | | 126-128 E 6th St. | CBD/Downtown/West End | 0256-2016 | June 29, 2016 | | January 24, 2017 | N/A |
| The Redding | | 3700 Reading Rd. | North Avondale | 0036-2021 | February 3, 2021 | | August 26, 2021 | N/A |
| Riverview Playground Entrance | | 900 Adams Crossing | East End | 0452-1985 | September 18, 1985 | | N/A | N/A |
| Sayler Park Indian Statue | | Gracely Dr. and Thornton Ave. | Sayler Park | N/A | N/A | | N/A | N/A |
| St. Louis Church | | 29 E 8th St. | CBD/Downtown | 0452-1985 | September 18, 1985 | | N/A | N/A |
| St. Francis Desales Church | | 1600 Madison Rd. | East Walnut Hills | 0221-1983 | May 18, 1983 | | March 1, 1974 | N/A |
| St. Francis Xavier Church | | 607 Sycamore St. | CBD/Downtown | 0249-1985 | May 30, 1985 | | July 18, 1980 | N/A |
| St. Marks Church | | 3500 Montgomery Rd. | Evanston | 454-2021 | December 8, 2021 | | N/A | N/A |
| St. Peter-in-Chains Cathedral | | 325 W 8th St. | CBD/Downtown/West End | 0251-1975 | May 14, 1975 | | January 18, 1973 | N/A |
| Traction Building | | 432 Walnut St. | CBD/Downtown | 0302-2016 | September 14, 2016 | | July 3, 2017 | N/A |
| Tyler-Davidson Fountain | | Vine St. and E 5th St. | CBD/Downtown | 0452-1985 | September 18, 1985 | | October 11, 1979 | N/A |
| Underwriter's Salvage Corps | | 110-112 E. 8th St. | CBD/Downtown | 0452-1985 | September 18, 1985 | | July 15, 1982 | N/A |
| Union Central Life Annex Building | | 309 Vine St. | CBD/Downtown | 0029-2015 | February 11, 2015 | | N/A | N/A |
| Williams YMCA | | 1228 E McMillan St. | Walnut Hills/East Walnut Hills | 0252-2016 | May 29, 2016 | | N/A | N/A |
| Windsor School | | 937 Windsor St. | Walnut Hills | 0045-2014 | March 26, 2014 | | N/A | N/A |
| Former WLWT studio (also known as Crosley Square) | | 140 W 9th St. | CBD/Downtown | 0452-1985 | September 18, 1985 | | N/A | N/A |

=== Historic Districts ===
For consistency, the list below uses the name from the City of Cincinnati website:

- Auburn Avenue Historic District (Mount Auburn)
- Betts–Longworth Historic District (West End)
- Cleinview-Hackberry Historic District (East Walnut Hills)
- College Hill Historic District (College Hill)
- Columbia Tusculum Historic District (Columbia-Tusculum)
- Court Street Historic District (CBD/Downtown)
- Dayton Street Historic District (West End)
- East Walnut Hills Historic District (East Walnut Hills)
- Holy Cross Monastery and Chapel Historic Site and Structure (Mount Adams)
- Hyde Park Observatory Historic District (Hyde Park)
- Lincoln-Melrose Historic District (Walnut Hills)
- Lytle Park Historic District (CBD/Downtown)
- Main Street Historic District (CBD/Downtown)
- Mohawk-Bellevue NBD Historic District (Over-the-Rhine)
- Ninth Street Historic District (CBD/Downtown)
- Northside NBD Historic District (Northside)
- Old Bond Hill Historic District (Bond Hill)
- Over-the-Rhine Historic District (Over-the-Rhine)
- Prospect Hill Historic District (Prospect Hill)
- Sacred Heart Academy Mt Storm Historic District (Clifton)
- Sohn-Mohawk Historic District (Over-the-Rhine)
- Third Main Street Historic District (CBD/Downtown)
- Uplands Historic District (East Walnut Hills)
- West Fourth Street Historic District (CBD/Downtown)
- Woodburn Avenue NBD Historic District (Woodburn)

== See also ==
- Lists of locally designated landmarks in the United States
- National Register of Historic Places listings in downtown Cincinnati
- National Register of Historic Places listings in eastern Cincinnati
- National Register of Historic Places listings in western Cincinnati
