= Immaculata Church =

Holy Cross-Immaculata Church
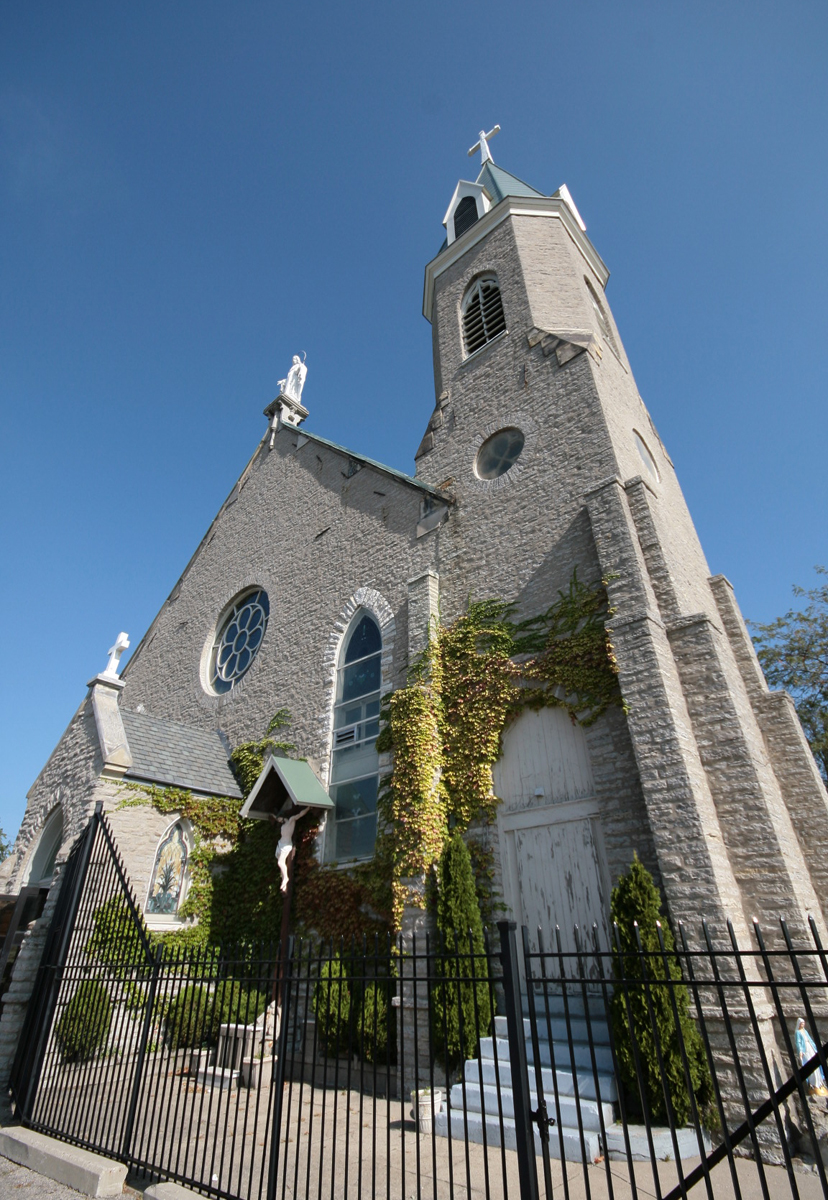
- Holy Cross-Immaculata Church
- Location: Cincinnati, Ohio, United States
- Denomination: Catholic
- Website: http://hciparish.org

History
- Founded: 1859
- Founder: John Baptist Purcell

Administration
- Diocese: Archdiocese of Cincinnati
- Immaculate Conception Church, School, and Rectory
- U.S. National Register of Historic Places
- Location: Cincinnati, Ohio
- Coordinates: 39°6′27.36″N 84°29′47.81″W
- Architect: Picket & Sons and John Toby
- Architectural style: Gothic Revival
- NRHP reference No.: 78002079
- Added to NRHP: December 29, 1978

The Church of the Immaculata, or Immaculata Church, is a Roman Catholic church atop Mt. Adams, a neighborhood in Cincinnati, Ohio. The church commemorates the Immaculate Conception and serves the Holy Cross–Immaculata Parish in the Archdiocese of Cincinnati. Located at 30 Guido Street, it allows a scenic view of the Ohio River below from one of the highest points in Cincinnati.

== History ==
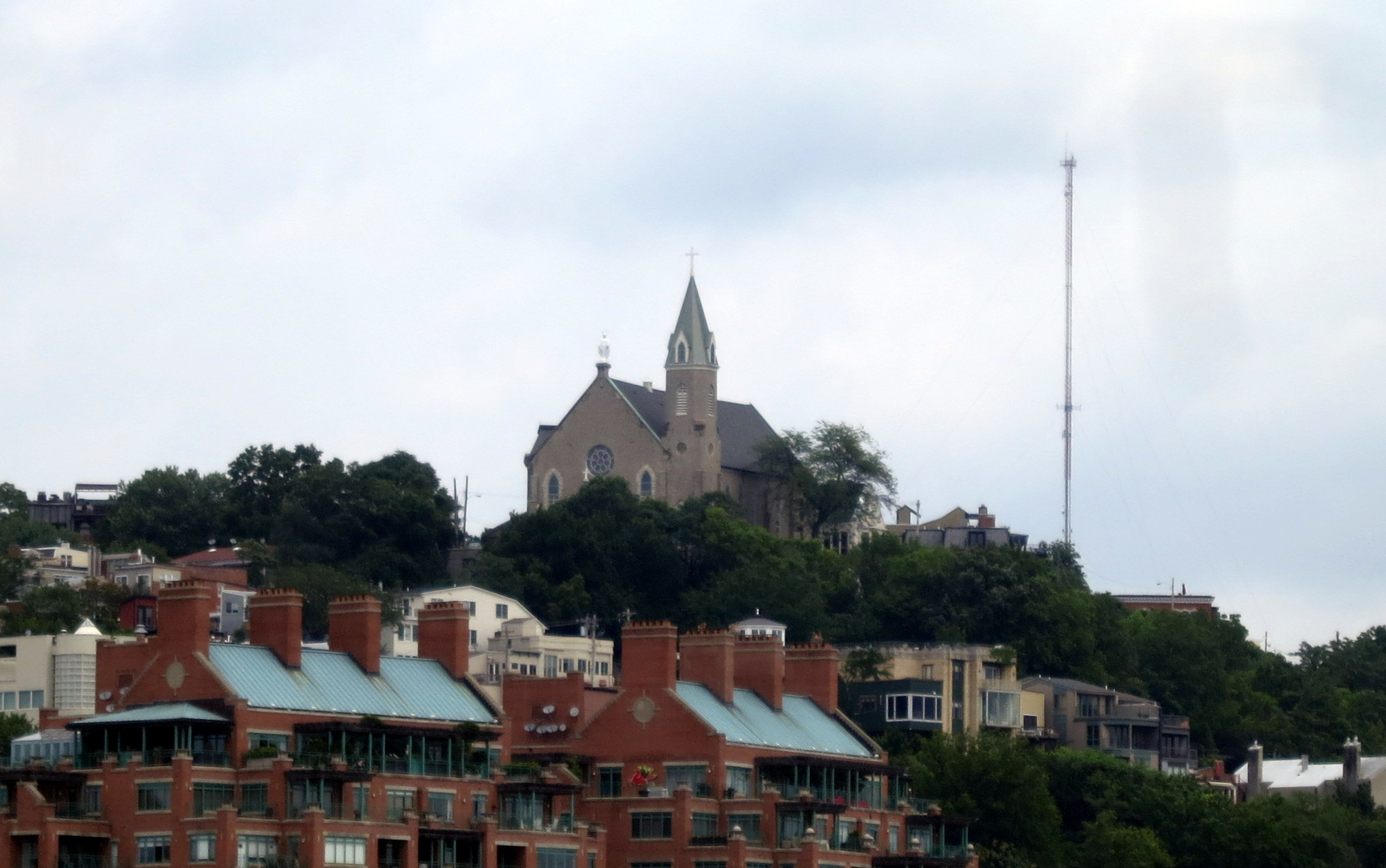
Holy Cross-Immaculata Church sitting atop Mt. Adams as seen from the Newport Southbank Bridge.

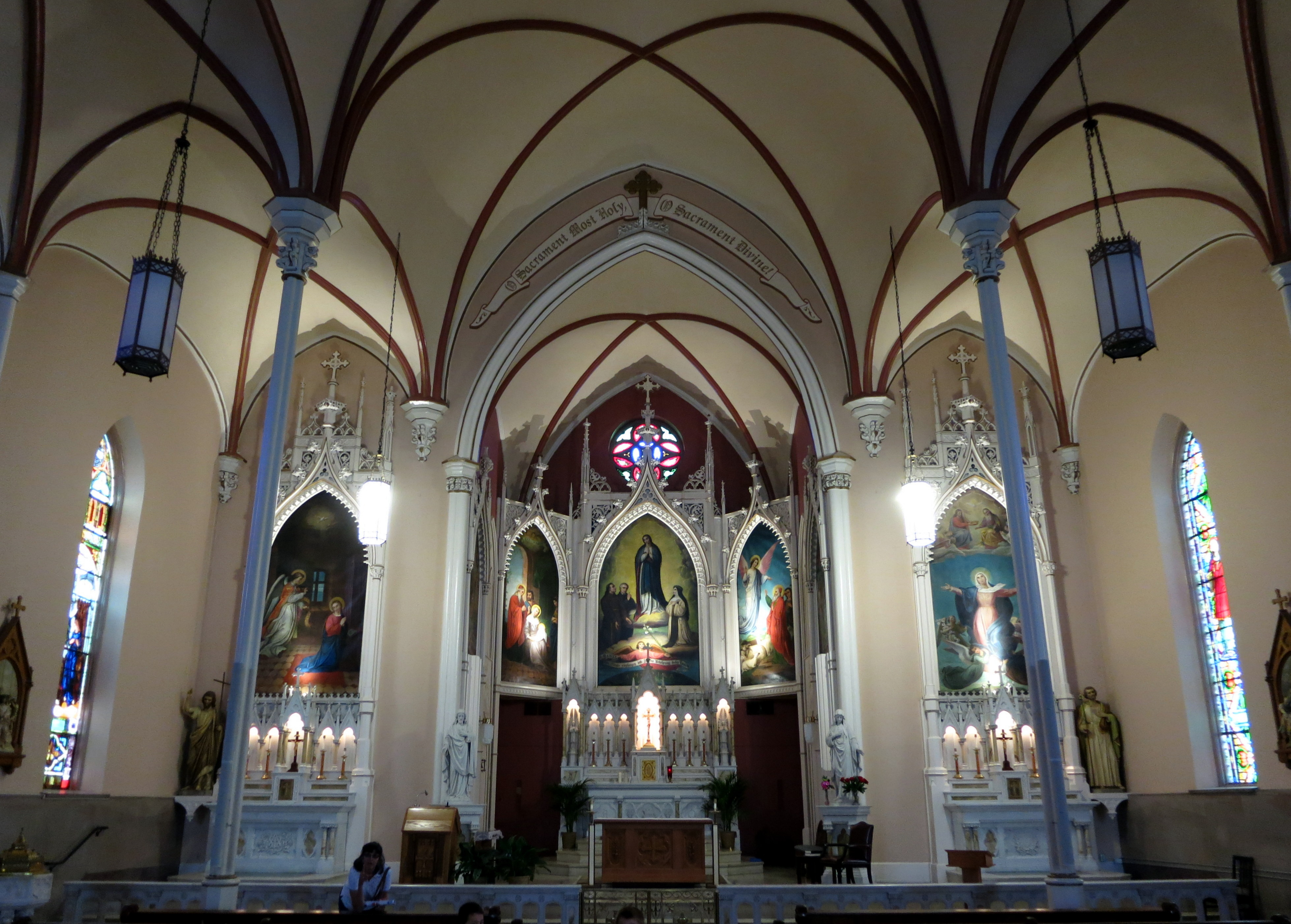
The church interior.

The limestone church was built in 1859, just before the American Civil War, for the German congregation in the city's Mt. Adams neighborhood. Archbishop John Baptist Purcell decided to build the church while praying during a severe storm at sea. He promised God that if he survived, he would build a church on the city's highest point.

The nearby Holy Cross parish primarily served Irish immigrants. When the Holy Cross monastery closed in 1977, the parishioners joined with Immaculata to become the Holy Cross–Immaculata parish. The Mt. Adams Preservation Association raised enough funds to commission the restoration of seven paintings by Joseph M. Kuriger. The paintings were mounted over the main altar and side altars between 1863 and 1870. A painted scroll stretches above the main altar across a depiction of the Immaculate Conception. In German, it reads:

O Maria, ohne Suende empfangen, bitte fuer die Bekehrung dieses Landes, Amerika.

(O Mary, conceived without sin, pray for the conversion of this country, America.)

On December 29, 1978, the Immaculate Conception Church, School, and Rectory was listed in the National Register of Historic Places. The school and rectory have since been closed.

In August 2005, workmen began chipping out bricks and glass block where a rose window once stood. The original had been lost in a storm. The new window came from Saint Bonaventure Church, which was closed and torn down in 2003. Fr. Neiheisel and Holy Cross Immaculata pastoral assistant Bill Frantz salvaged a colorful, round, stained-glass rose window that had stood over the altar. Neiheisel then raised $44,000 to have the window reinforced, enlarged with an 18-inch ring of additional glass, and ultimately set into the Holy Cross-Immaculata wall behind a layer of strong, protective glass.

== Traditions ==
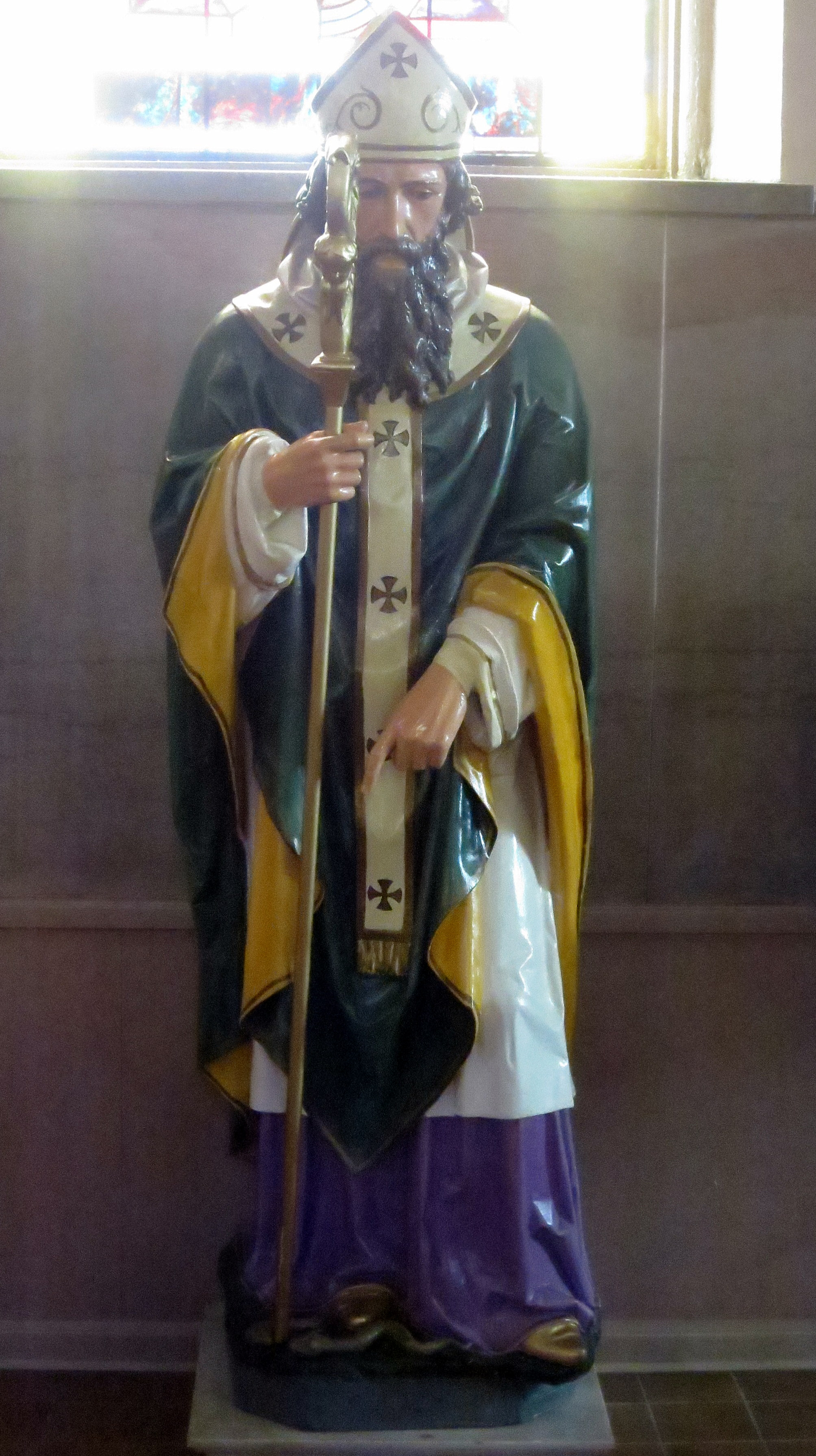
The church's statue of St. Patrick.

The Immaculata Church has served since 1860 as a pilgrimage church, where on Good Friday the faithful ascend 85 steps to the church's front door from the neighborhood below while praying the Rosary. An additional 65 steps start at the base of Mt. Adams, with a pedestrian bridge over Columbia Parkway connecting the two paths. The steps were originally made of wood, but in 1911, the City of Cincinnati helped the church build concrete steps.

Each year in February members of the Ancient Order of Hibernians knock on the church door and ask permission to remove the statue of St. Patrick. The Priest invokes the intercession of St. Patrick. With bagpipes leading the way the six-foot statue of St. Patrick leaves the church and starts his Mini Parade through Mt. Adams.
