= Main and Third Street Cluster =

- U.S. National Register of Historic Places
- Cincinnati Local Historic Landmark
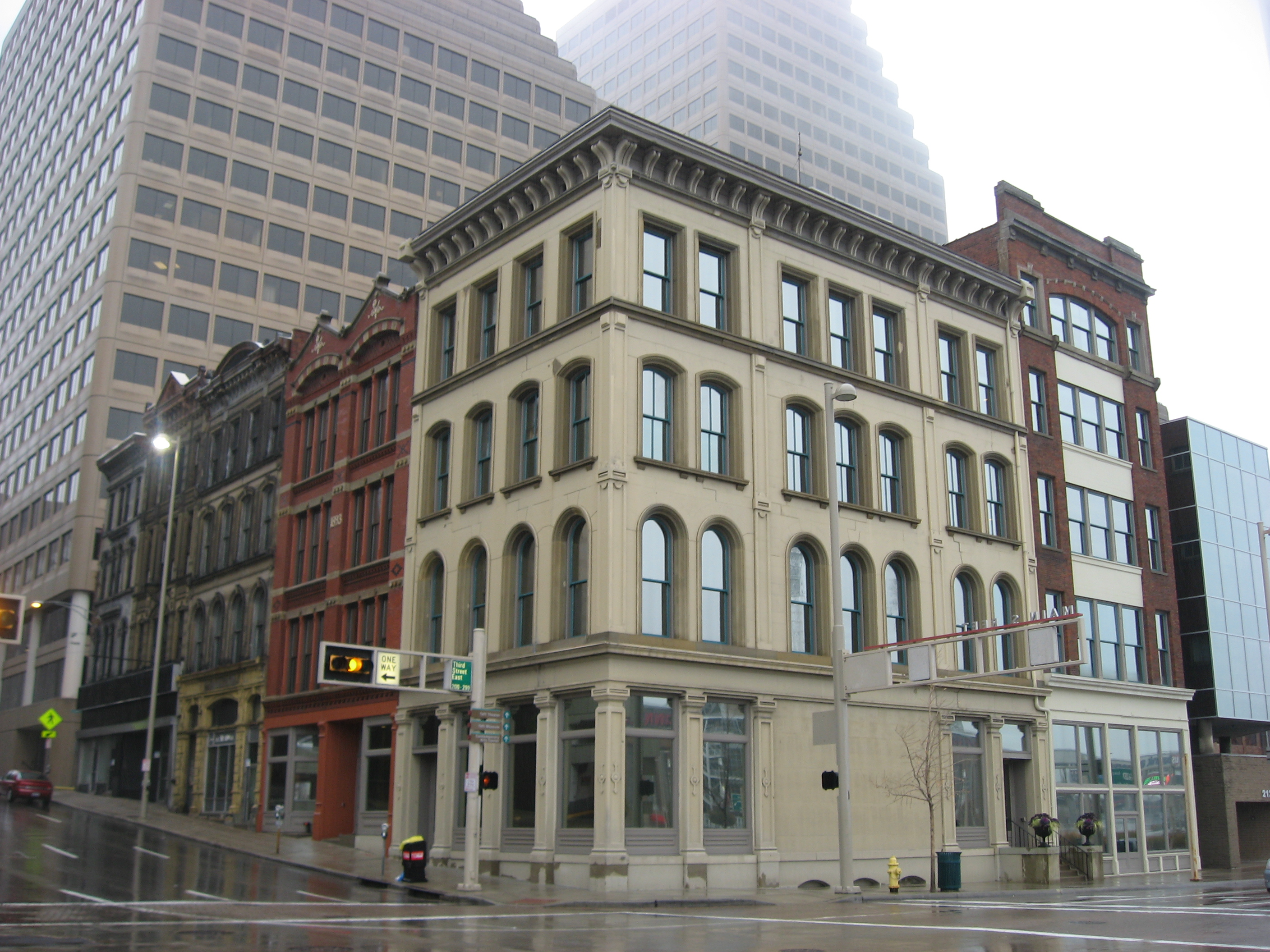
- Comprehensive view of the cluster

- Location within Ohio Location within the United States
- Location: 300-302 and 304-306 Main St. (also 308-318 Main), and 208-210 E. 3rd St., Cincinnati, Ohio
- Coordinates: 39°5′58″N 84°30′31″W
- Area: Less than 1 acre (0.40 ha)
- Built: 1862, 1893, 1910
- Architect: William Walters
- Architectural style: Italianate, Neoclassical, Victorian
- NRHP reference No.: 83001984
- Added to NRHP: July 15, 1983

The Main and Third Street Cluster is a group of three historic buildings in downtown Cincinnati, Ohio, United States. Named for its location on the northeastern corner of the intersection of Main and Third Streets, the cluster is historically significant for its general homogeneity despite being constructed over a long period of time.

Three buildings compose the cluster:

- The Anderson Building, which faces Main, was built in the Victorian style in 1893.
- The former McMicken School of Design, located on the corner, is an Italianate structure completed in 1862. Four stories tall, it is constructed of sandstone.
- The Burkhardt Building, which faces Third, is a Neoclassical building; it was erected in 1910.

Although the ages of the three buildings are nearly fifty years from oldest to newest, they nevertheless compose an architecturally important unit; architectural historians have ranked both the McMicken School and the Anderson Building as premier examples of their styles, due in part to their high-quality construction methods and artistry. Although the Burkhardt Building is of lesser significance, it remains a good example of Neoclassical architecture. Together, the three buildings are typical of late nineteenth-century and early twentieth-century architecture, which combined a range of styles in the same geographical area.

Due to their location very close to the shoreline of the Ohio River and to the oldest parts of Cincinnati, the cluster occupies land that formerly held other important buildings. Chief among these is a previous occupant of the land under the McMicken School of Design: during the 1830s, the building on the site was used as offices for young lawyer Salmon P. Chase; a well-regarded book about Ohio law that he wrote while working at Third and Main helped propel him to prominence in Ohio politics and eventually to the position of Chief Justice of the United States. In 1983, the Main and Third Street Cluster was listed on the National Register of Historic Places, qualifying both because of its historic architecture and because of its place in local history. In late 2012, the cluster was expanded by the addition of buildings as far north as 318 Main Street; the addition was given the name of "Main Street Buildings".
