= Henry Powell House =

Historic house in Ohio, United States

- U.S. National Register of Historic Places
- U.S. Historic district – Contributing property
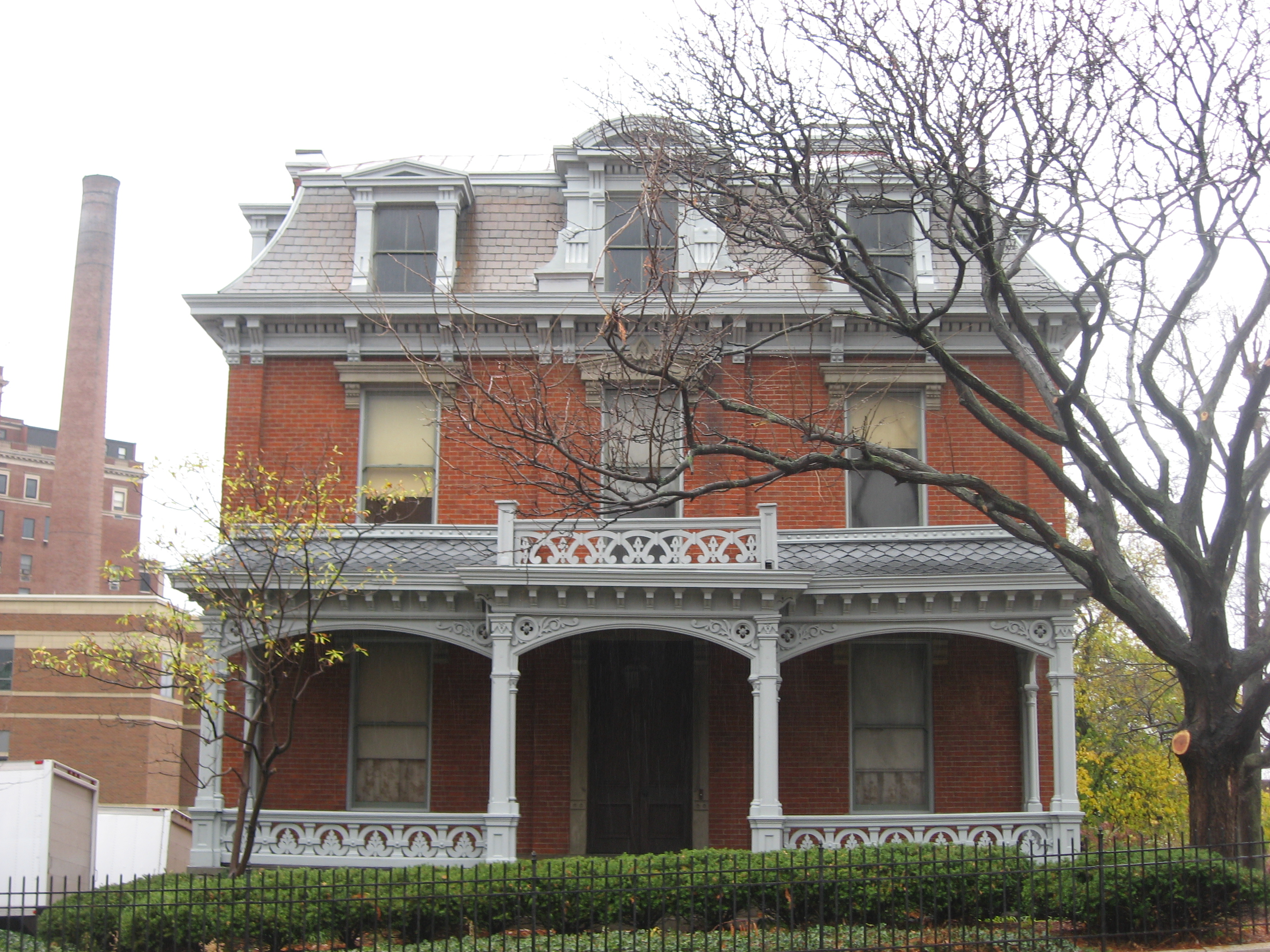
- Front of the house

- Location within Ohio Location within the United States
- Location: 2209 Auburn Ave., Cincinnati, Ohio
- Coordinates: 39°7′20″N 84°30′31.5″W
- Area: 0 acres (0 ha)
- Built: 1858
- Architect: Samuel Hannaford
- Architectural style: Second Empire
- Part of: Mount Auburn Historic District (ID73001464)
- MPS: Samuel Hannaford and Sons TR in Hamilton County
- NRHP reference No.: 80003076
- Added to NRHP: March 3, 1980

The Henry Powell House is a historic house in the Mount Auburn neighborhood of Cincinnati, Ohio, United States. Constructed in the mid-19th century, it experienced a radical transformation near the end of the century under the direction of a leading regional architect. This French-style residence has been named a historic site.

William Powell established a Cincinnati metalworking firm in 1846 under the name of "Powell Valve and Brassworks Company". Among his sons was Henry Powell, who became wealthy enough to finance the construction of a larger and more ornate house. This residence, the present house, was constructed in 1858. At the time of construction, Powell's home was a Greek Revival structure, greatly different in appearance from its present form. Its structure was profoundly modified in an extensive reconstruction of 1882, performed according to a design by leading Cincinnati architect Samuel Hannaford; by replacing the old roof with a mansard roof and adding a wooden porch, Hannaford destroyed the original Greek Revival styling and replaced it with the Second Empire exterior that remains today. The Powell House was reconstructed during Hannaford's longest period of independent practice: his reputation solidified by his design of Music Hall, Hannaford operated without partners from 1877 until 1887. During this time, he produced many buildings in various Victorian architectural styles.

Today, the Powell House is a brick building with stone foundation and a slate roof, plus additional elements of brick and wood. Three stories tall, the facade is divided into three bays, with the wooden porch extending across the entire width of the first story. More decorations are present on the porch than on any other sections of the exterior, due to components such as an exceptional balustrade and an unusually flat mansard roof featuring a cornice with dentils; the structure comprises similar sides that differ substantially from the central section.

In 1973, much of Mount Auburn was designated the Mount Auburn Historic District and added to the National Register of Historic Places. The historic district embraced both sides of Auburn Avenue throughout the neighborhood, and the Powell House was considered important enough to the district's integrity that it was designated a contributing property. Although it was already part of the district, the house was added to the Register again in 1980, this time by itself; it was part of a group of dozens of buildings designed by Samuel Hannaford, nominated as a multiple property submission due to their place as examples of the work of the most important architect to practice in nineteenth-century Cincinnati.
