= American Can Company Building =

- U.S. National Register of Historic Places
- Cincinnati Local Historic Landmark
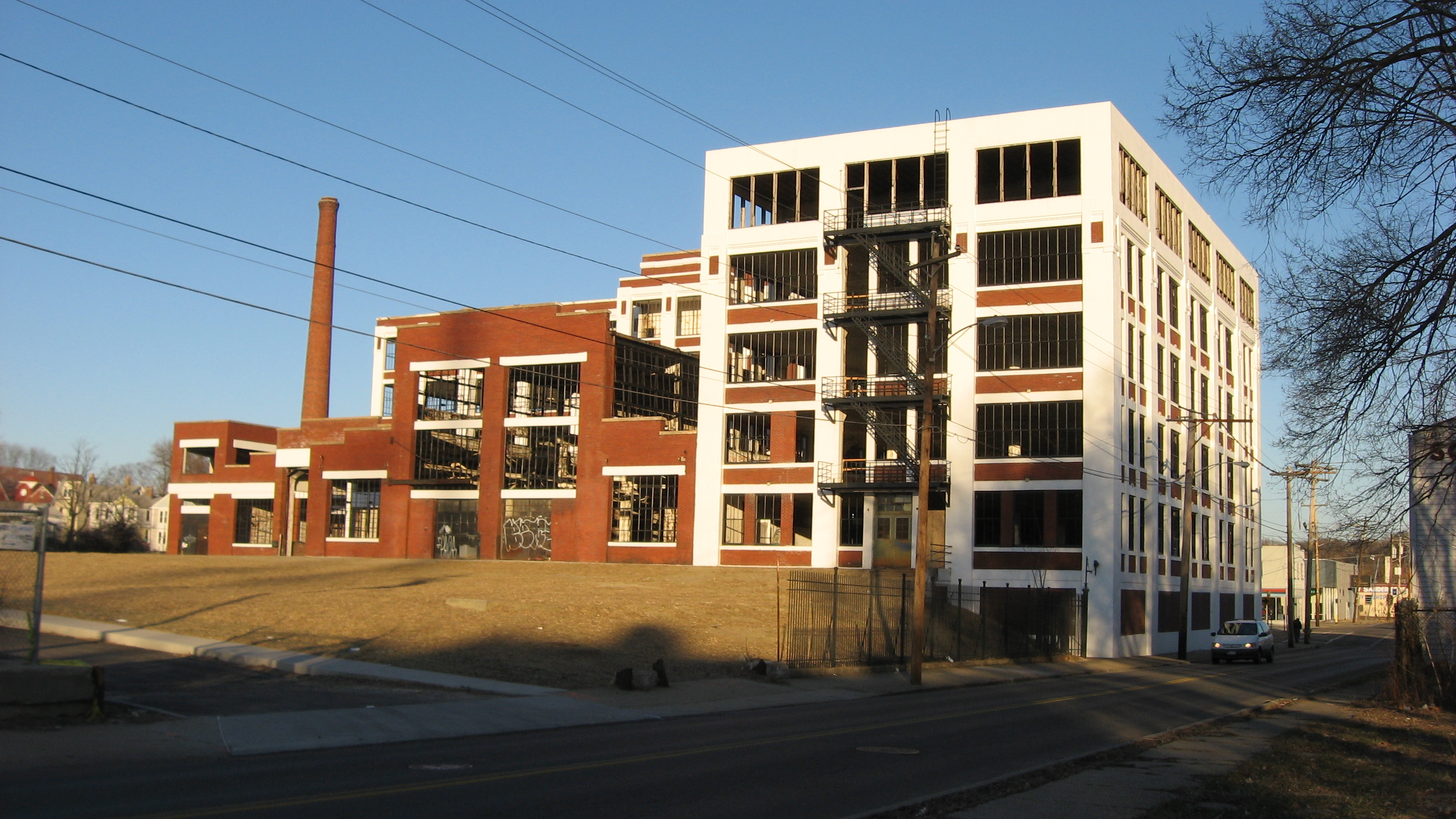
- Western side of the building

- Location within Ohio Location within the United States
- Location: 4101 Spring Grove Ave., Cincinnati, Ohio
- Coordinates: 39°9′37″N 84°32′14″W
- Area: 2.3 acres (0.93 ha)
- Architect: C.G. Preis
- Architectural style: Early Commercial
- NRHP reference No.: 07001092
- Added to NRHP: October 17, 2007

The American Can Company Building, now known as the American Can Lofts, is a historic former factory in the Northside neighborhood of Cincinnati, Ohio, United States. Built in 1921, it is a concrete building with a concrete foundation; five stories tall, it has a total floor space of approximately 180,000 square feet (17,000 m^{2}). Built by the American Can Company, the factory was used to manufacture can-making machines, rather than producing the cans itself; it remained in operation until closure in 1963. Two years later, it was reopened by the Cleveland Machine Company, which used its first floor for machining purposes; after their departure in 1978, it sat almost totally unused, with the only exceptions being small businesses such as T-shirt printers and warehouse operators.

In late 2005, a local redevelopment company purchased the American Can Company Building, using a $500,000 loan from the city's community development office. Expecting to have to pay another $800,000 to resolve longstanding environmental issues at the property, the company received a grant of $750,000 from the Clean Ohio Assistance Fund. As this process was a significant component of a larger redevelopment project on the eastern portion of Northside, the American Can owners sought to renovate their property in a manner compatible with its historic nature. In 2006, the building was assessed against the guidelines of the National Register of Historic Places, a federal historic preservation program, and found to be eligible for inclusion on the Register. Besides starting the National Register nomination process, the owners applied for the building to be designated a historic site by Cincinnati's city planning commission; such approval was granted in July 2007. Three months later, the National Park Service added the building to the Register.

== Redevelopment ==
The owners' ultimate goal was to convert the property into apartments and small shops. With renovations nearly complete, the building reopened as American Can Lofts in September, 2011.
