= Hopkins Park (Cincinnati) =

Park in Hamilton County, Ohio, United States

Coordinates: 39°07′04″N 84°30′31″W

Hopkins Park is a small 0.895-acre (0.362 ha) urban park in the neighborhood of Mt. Auburn, Cincinnati, Ohio.

The land was donated by merchant Lewis C. Hopkins on January 18, 1866, on the condition that the park "forever be kept free of buildings, and ... should be tastefully laid out and planted with trees and shrubbery".
