= Krippendorf-Dittman Company =

- U.S. National Register of Historic Places
- Cincinnati Local Historic Landmark
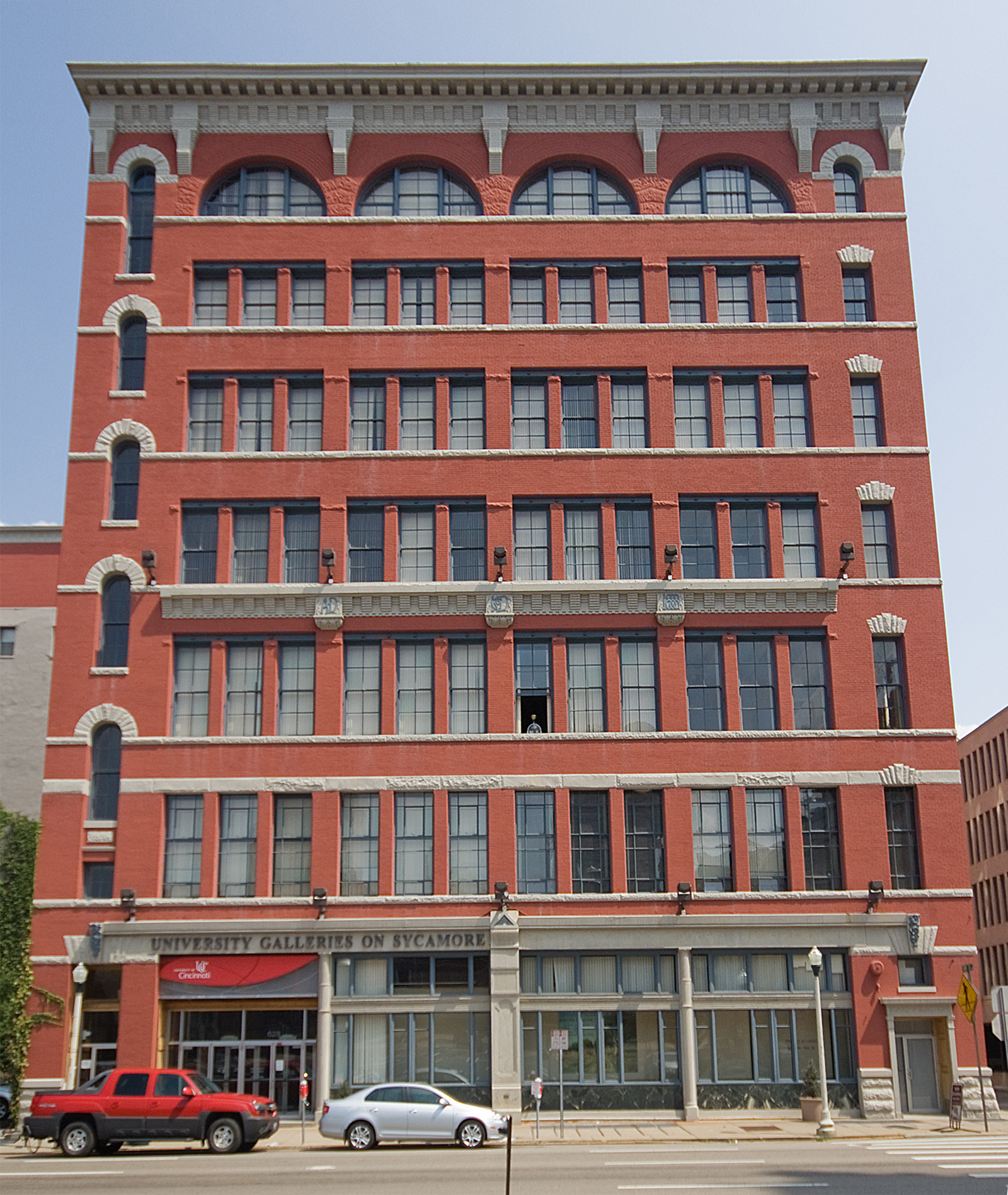
- Location: Cincinnati, Ohio
- Coordinates: 39°6′14.07″N 84°30′31.08″W
- Architect: Samuel Hannaford & Sons and Louis Picket
- Architectural style: Late Victorian
- MPS: Samuel Hannaford and Sons TR in Hamilton County
- NRHP reference No.: 80003061
- Added to NRHP: March 3, 1980

Krippendorf-Dittman Company is a registered historic building in Cincinnati, Ohio, listed in the National Register on March 3, 1980.

Formerly the Krippendorf-Dittman Shoe Company factory, the building has been converted to Sycamore Place luxury loft apartments. The street level retail space presently holds the Sycamore Gallery art collection of University of Cincinnati College of Design, Architecture, Art, and Planning.
