= Peter G. Thomson House =

Historic house in Ohio, United States

- U.S. National Register of Historic Places
- Cincinnati Local Historic Landmark
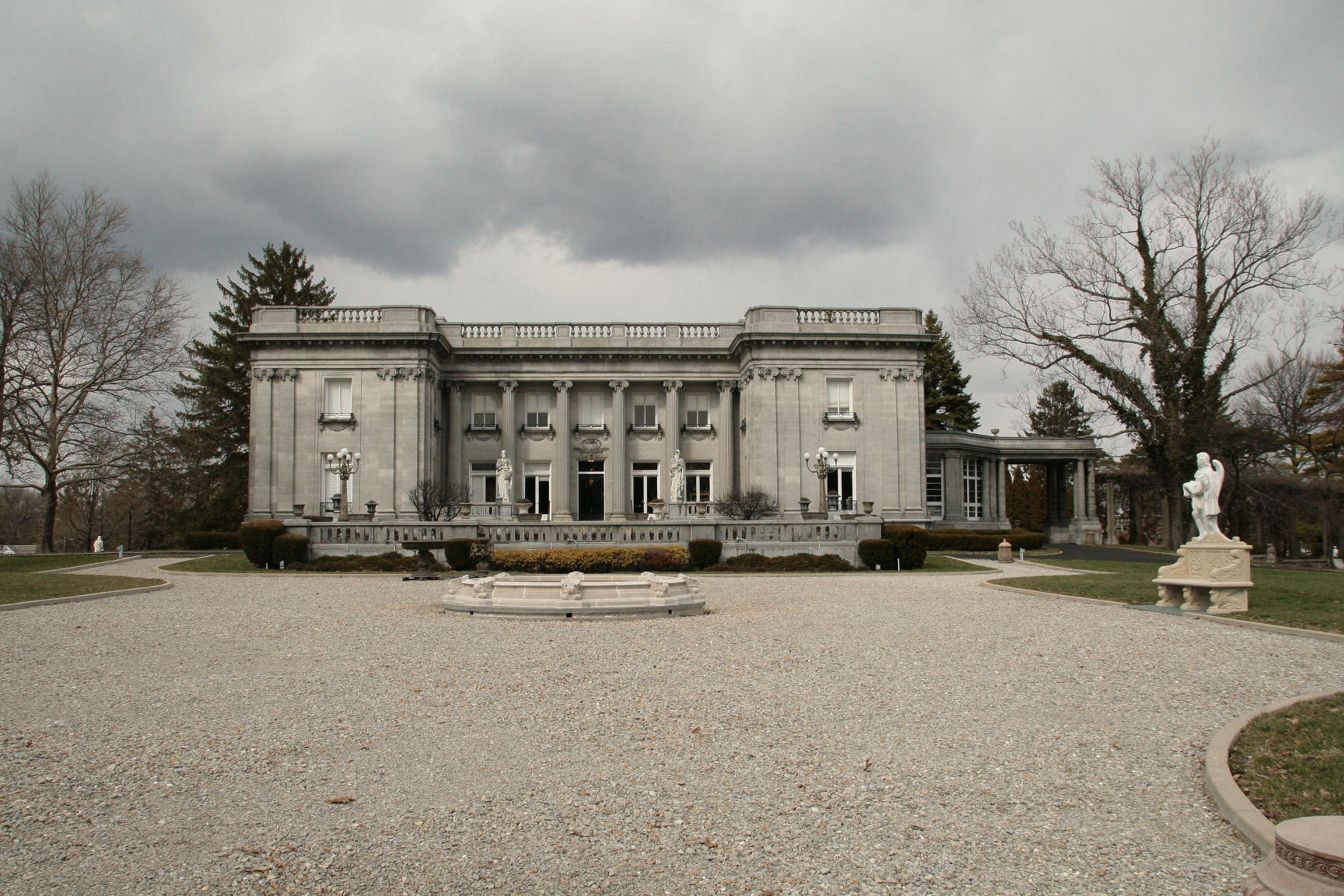
- Location: 5870 Belmont Ave., Cincinnati, Ohio
- Coordinates: 39°11′54.44″N 84°33′16.20″W
- Architect: James Gamble Rogers
- Architectural style: Beaux Arts, Renaissance
- NRHP reference No.: 79001860
- Added to NRHP: November 29, 1979

Peter G. Thomson House, commonly known as Laurel Court, is a registered historic building in Cincinnati, Ohio, listed in the National Register on November 29, 1979.

Currently the house is a private residence that is available for tours by reservation and for special events.

== Design and construction ==
Peter G. Thomson, founder of The Champion Coated Paper Co., began construction on Laurel Court in 1902. He selected James Gamble Rogers, the nephew of Peter's wife, Laura Gamble Thomson, to design the Gilded Age mansion. Rogers based the house's ordonnance and design on the Trianon de Marbre, the Grand Trianon at Versailles, France, as can be seen from the duplication of the Grand Trianon's decorated Ionic order and the concept of a colonnade between cubical pavilions. The house is smaller than the Grand Trianon, it is revetted in simple stone rather than the marble of the French prototype, it is two stories rather than one, and was adapted to meet the requirements of a private residence at the time of construction. It cost $1 million to build in 1905. The Thomson family moved into the College Hill residence in 1907. Following the death of Peter G. Thomson, his son Logan and his family continued to reside in on the property until Logan's death in 1946.

The property was purchased and then given to the Archdiocese of Cincinnati, with John T. McNicholas' moving there from the archdiocesan seminary property (now the Our Lady of the Holy Spirit Center) in 1946 and living there until his death at the property in 1950. Karl Joseph Alter also lived in the home. In 1977, following the death of Alter, the Cincinnati archdiocese listed the property for sale and by 1979 it was owned by Donald LaRosa, the founder of LaRosa's Pizzeria. LaRosa sold the property for $1 million in 1991.

=== Features ===
- Atrium with a retractable roof
- Rookwood tile swimming pool
- Turkish carpets
- Library paneled in African rosewood
- Music room decorated in gold leaf

== Historic uses ==
- Single Dwelling
- Secondary Structure
- Residence of John T. McNicholas, Karl Joseph Alter(1947-1977)
- Former residence of Donald Larosa
