= Holy Cross Monastery and Church =

- Holy Cross Monastery and Chapel
- U.S. National Register of Historic Places
- Cincinnati Local Historic Landmark
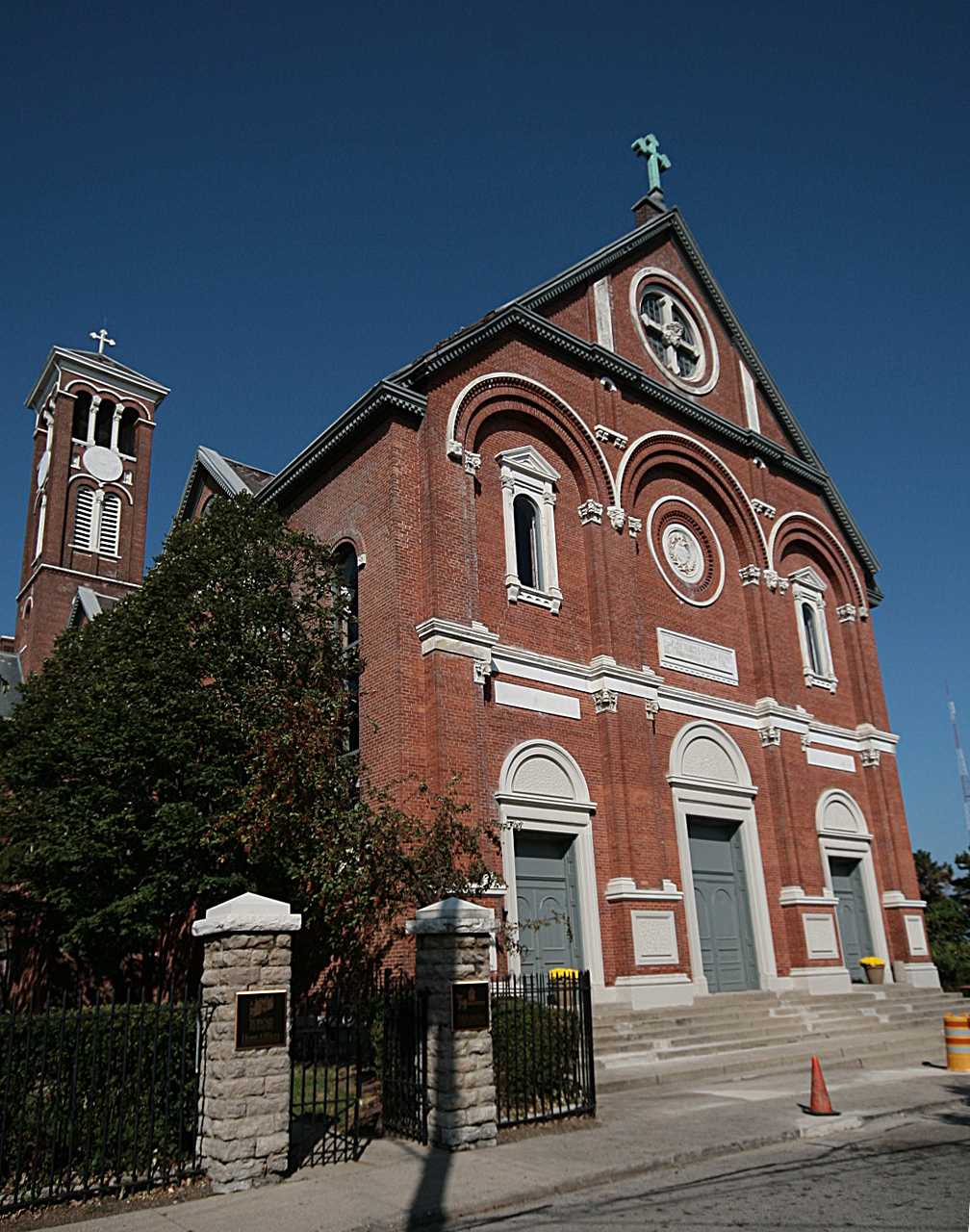
- Location: Cincinnati, Ohio
- Coordinates: 39°6′26.75″N 84°29′54.64″W
- Architect: John Foley and Louis Piket & Sons
- Architectural style: Neo-romanesque
- NRHP reference No.: 78002078
- Added to NRHP: September 13, 1978

Holy Cross Monastery
- Interactive map of Holy Cross Monastery

Monastery information
- Full name: Monastery of the Holy Cross
- Order: Passionists
- Established: 1873
- Disestablished: 1977
- Diocese: Cincinnati
- Controlled churches: Church of the Holy Cross

People
- Founders: The Rev. Father Guido Matassi, C.P.

Architecture
- Functional status: closed
- Architect: Louis Piket & Sons
- Style: Italian Renaissance Revival
- Groundbreaking: 1843 (observatory), September 1899 (new monastery)
- Completed date: June 1901

Holy Cross Monastery and Chapel is a registered historic building complex in Cincinnati, Ohio, listed in the National Register on September 13, 1978. Closed in 1977, it is now the corporate headquarters of a property management company, and an event space.

== Founding ==
Between 1873 and 1977, the Holy Cross Monastery was a Roman Catholic monastery atop Mt. Adams in Cincinnati, which served a parish of the same name. It was founded by the Passionists, who were first brought to Mt. Adams in 1871 by John Baptist Purcell, the Archbishop of Cincinnati, to run Immaculata Church, founded in 1860.

The first Passionist pastor of Immaculata Parish, Guido Matassi, C.P., immediately saw that the rectory of the parish would be inadequate to their needs as a semi-monastic community. By chance, the building which used to house the Mitchel Observatory (later the Cincinnati Observatory), located only two blocks away from Immaculata Church, was being abandoned due to the effects of industrial pollution.

The terms of the will of the donor of the property which had housed the observatory, however, required the return of the property to his heirs. When Matassi approached them about purchasing the property, they demanded a price which he would not pay. With the encouragement and support of Sarah Peter, daughter of an early Governor of Ohio and a noted convert to Catholicism, the city stepped in and purchased the property from the heir. The following year Matassi signed a 99-year lease with the City of Cincinnati for a building and a property atop Mt. Adams. The Passionists remodeled the structure and added a third floor.

== The Church and Monastery of the Holy Cross ==
The first Church of the Holy Cross, made out of wood, was finished in 1873, standing next to the monastery, but in 1895 it was replaced by a large, permanent structure. It served mostly Irish immigrants. Holy Cross added a grade school in 1891. A weekly novena in honor of St. Gabriel began in 1929.

In 1899 the monastery was condemned as unsafe, and a new edifice was built in the same location. It was dedicated on June 9, 1901. Underneath the monastery was "The Grotto". Immaculata parish had a Holy Week tradition of people praying the rosary while climbing the 125 steps to the church. After "praying the steps", they would then proceed to "The Grotto" at Holy Cross. It was believed that praying there would enhance the possibility of a cure, and there was a wide assortment of crutches at "The Grotto".

== Sale and Redevelopment ==
In 1970 Holy Cross Parish was merged with Immaculata Parish, also located atop Mt. Adams. The combined parish has since been known as Holy Cross-Immaculata. When Holy Cross closed, a statue of St. Patrick was surreptitiously relocated to Immaculata. The Ancient Order of Hibernians annually re-enact St. Patrick's "liberation" and celebrate with a luncheon and Mass at Immaculata.

By the mid-1970s, the Passionist community decided to consolidate their operations to Chicago. The Passionists made the decision to close Holy Cross Monastery in 1976 and the building was sold. After passing through a couple of owners, the monastery is now the corporate headquarters of Towne Properties, a property management company. The church was renovated in 2014 as an event center hosting weddings, receptions, and corporate functions. A chapel garden was installed to complement the newly renovated former church. With the assistance of Towne Properties employees, a statue of an angel was installed n the property by parishioners of Immaculata on a pedestal that previously held one of St. Gabriel.
