= George Hunt Pendleton House =

Historic house in Ohio, United States

- U.S. National Register of Historic Places
- U.S. National Historic Landmark
- U.S. Historic district – Contributing property
- Cincinnati Local Historic Landmark
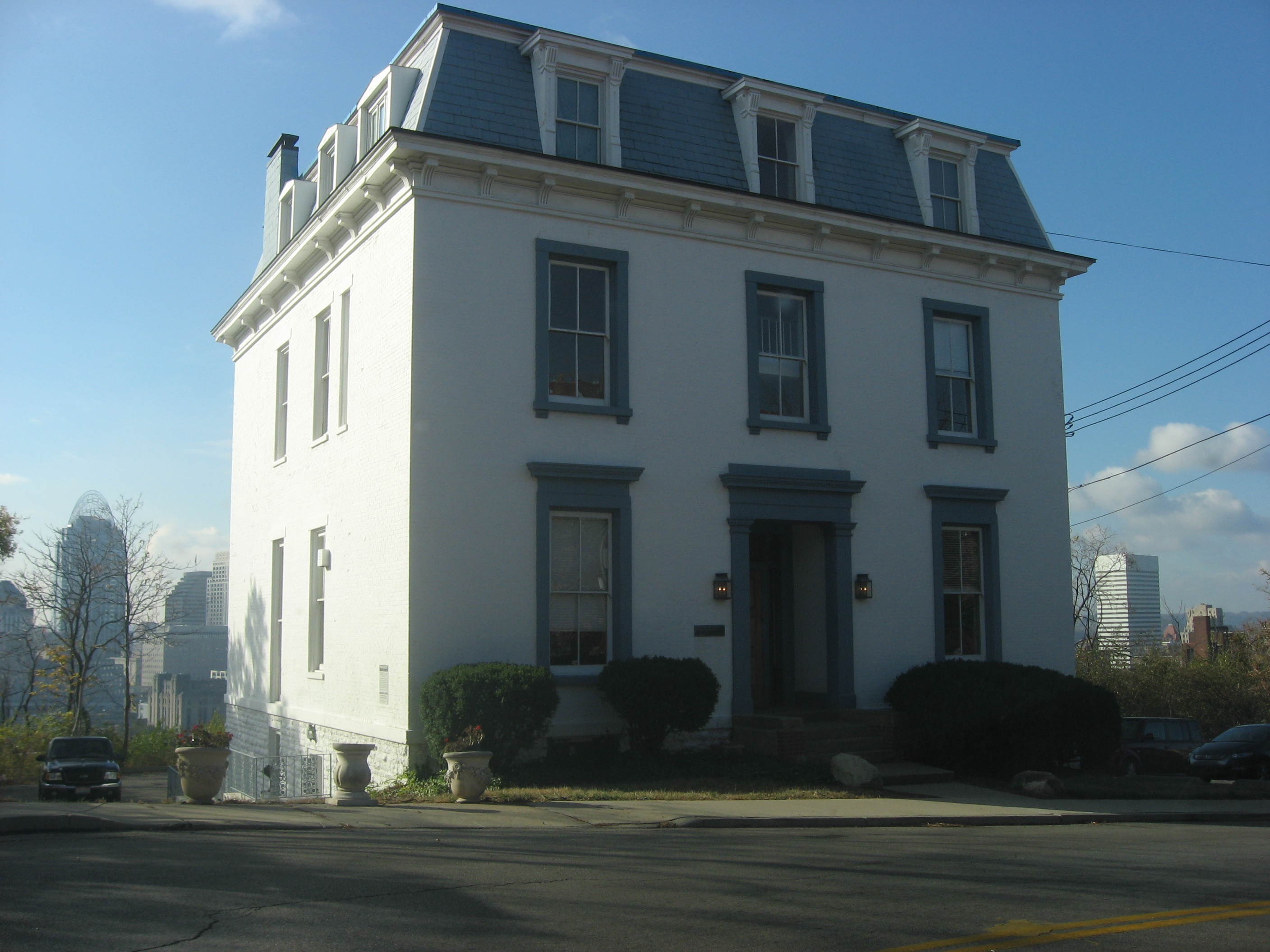
- The house as visible from Liberty Hill

- Location within Ohio Location within the United States
- Location: 559 Liberty Hill, Cincinnati, Ohio
- Coordinates: 39°6′43″N 84°30′16″W
- Area: less than one acre
- Built: 1870
- Architectural style: Second Empire
- Part of: Prospect Hill Historic District (ID80003078)
- NRHP reference No.: 66000611

Significant dates
- Added to NRHP: October 15, 1966
- Designated NHL: January 29, 1964
- Designated CP: September 4, 1980

The George H. Pendleton House is a historic house in the Prospect Hill Historic District of Cincinnati, Ohio. It was built in 1870 in the French Second Empire style. From 1879 until his death in 1889, this was the residence of Senator George Hunt Pendleton (1825–1889). As a U.S. senator (1879–1885), Pendleton spearheaded civil service reform, meeting here in 1882 to draft the Pendleton Act, which created the Civil Service merit system. The building, now in mixed commercial and residential use, was designated a National Historic Landmark in 1964.

== Description and history ==
The George H. Pendleton House is located north of downtown Cincinnati in the Prospect Hill neighborhood, on the south side of Liberty Hill at its junction with Higland Avenue. The hilltop mansion, set high on a ridge, is visible from many points in the downtown basin below. The house is a 2 1/2-story brick building, with a mansard roof providing a full third floor in the attic. The roof has a bracketed eave, and is pierced by dormers with flanking bracketed pilasters. The main facade is three bays wide, with a center entrance flanked by pilasters and topped by a corniced entablature. Ground floor windows are topped by projecting cornices, and second-floor windows have bracketed sills. The interior has been extensively altered, and is not historically significant.

The house was built about 1870, and was the home of George Hunt Pendleton from 1879 until his death in 1889. Pendleton was a lawyer and Democratic politician, who first won election to the United States Senate in 1857. He left Congress in 1865, but was returned to the Senate in 1879. At the time, jobs in the federal government were largely distributed through political patronage, often without regard to the competence for the position by the individuals hired. Although Pendleton appears not to have been a strong advocate of civil service reform, a Senate subcommittee met in his Cincinnati home in early 1882 to complete a draft civil service reform bill. This bill, enacted later in 1882 following widespread popular calls for civil service reform, was known as the Pendleton Act, and represents the birth of the modern merit-based civil service that has operated since. Pendleton's involvement in the bill cost him reelection in 1884, due to a lack of support from party operatives who had opposed the reforms.

After Pendleton's death, the house went through a number of owners and uses, including at one time as a nine-unit tenement house. It was eventually given an exterior restoration in the late 20th century. It now houses commercial offices on the ground floor and residences in the upper floors.

== See also ==
- List of National Historic Landmarks in Ohio
