= Madison–Stewart Historic District =

Historic district in Ohio, United States

- U.S. National Register of Historic Places
- U.S. Historic district
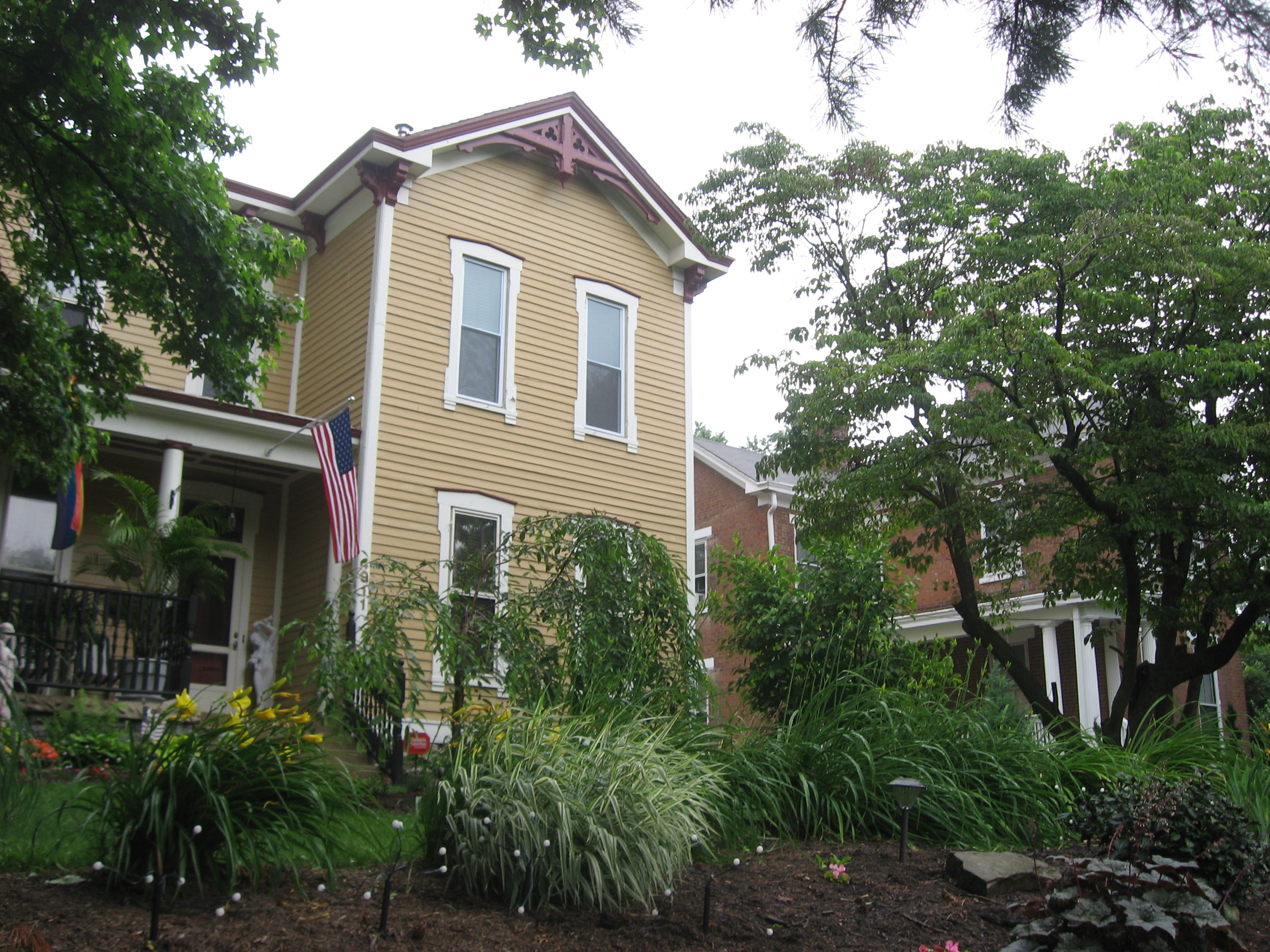
- Houses in the district

- Location within Ohio Location within the United States
- Location: Jct. of Madison and Stewart Sts., Cincinnati, Ohio
- Coordinates: 39°9′36″N 84°23′53″W
- Built: 1833
- Architectural style: Stick/Eastlake, Italianate, Federal
- NRHP reference No.: 75001419
- Added to NRHP: May 29, 1975

Madison–Stewart Historic District is a historic district in Cincinnati, Ohio. It was listed on the National Register of Historic Places in 1975 and contains twelve contributing buildings.
