= Mount Auburn Historic District =

Historic district in Ohio, United States

- U.S. National Register of Historic Places
- U.S. Historic district
- Cincinnati Local Historic Landmark
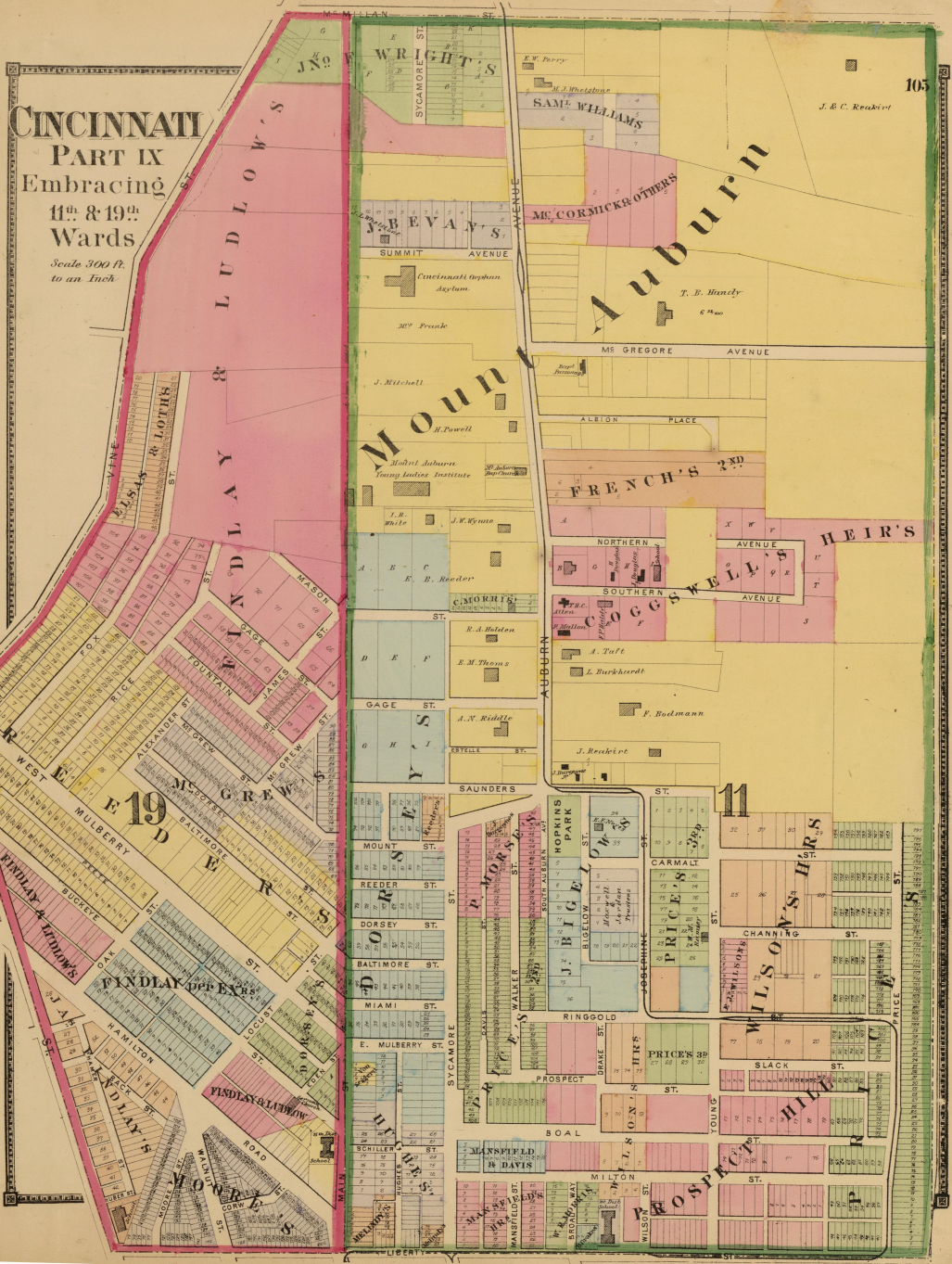
- A map of Mount Auburn circa 1869. Visible are the house of Alphonso Taft (which is now the William Howard Taft National Historic Site), the Cincinnati Orphan Asylum and the Mount Auburn Young Ladies Institute.

- Location within Ohio Location within the United States
- Location: Both sides of Auburn Ave. from Ringgold St. to Howard Taft Rd., Cincinnati, Ohio
- Coordinates: 39°7′12″N 84°30′30″W
- Area: 414 acres (1.68 km^{2}), 31 buildings
- Built: 1819
- Architectural style: Mid 19th Century Revival, Late Victorian
- NRHP reference No.: 73001464
- Added to NRHP: March 28, 1973

Mount Auburn Historic District is located in the Mount Auburn neighborhood of Cincinnati, Ohio. It extends along both sides of Auburn Avenue roughly between Ringold Street and William H. Taft Road. The population of Mount Auburn was 5,094 at the 2020 census.

The District was placed on the National Register of Historic Places on March 28, 1973 (No. 73001464). Mount Auburn was founded as a hilltop retreat for Cincinnati's social elite where wealthier people could escape the dirt, heat, smoke and crowded conditions of the lower city. Ornate historic mansions with incredible panoramic views still reflect this heritage.

The district contains notable houses of Federal, Greek Revival, Italian Villa, Romanesque Revival, and Georgian Revival styles. The houses date from 1819 to the turn of the century and are associated with the prominent Cincinnatians. Noted residents include President William Howard Taft.

== Demographics ==
Population of Mt. Auburn 1900-2020
Year	Pop.	±%
1900	11,625	—
1910	13,168	+13.3%
1920	15,100	+14.7%
1930	15,512	+2.7%
1940	14,264	−8.0%
1950	16,769	+17.6%
1960	16,821	+0.3%
1970	12,549	−25.4%
1980	8,889	−29.2%
1990	7,452	−16.2%
2000	6,516	−12.6%
2010	4,904	−24.7%
2020	5,070	+3.4%

Source - City of Cincinnati Statistical Database

== History ==
Mt. Auburn was for a long time almost the only suburb of the city. It was at first called Keys' Hill, after an old settler, and this name was used until 1837. By 1826 a number of prominent citizens had taken up residence there.

Mount Auburn was platted as a town in 1837. It owes its name to the then newly established Mount Auburn Cemetery of Boston. By 1842, it extended from Liberty Street (Liberty Street got its name because the city laws were not enforced north of it and it was the location of the "northern liberties" – gambling, drinking and carousing) to McMillan Street (note that the historic district only goes as far south as Ringold Street, the rest of the Mount Auburn neighborhood to the south is the Prospect Hill Historic District). Mount Auburn was annexed to the City of Cincinnati in 1849.

== Buildings and sites ==
- William Howard Taft National Historic Site
- The Mount Auburn Young Ladies Institute was established in 1856 to provide higher education to females. It was known for a strenuous curriculum, particularly in science and mathematics. The Institute was located on twenty-three acres of land that was landscaped by a gardener. Only four acres were cultivated for vegetable and flower gardens and a fruit orchard. The remainder was part of the landscaped area.
- Cincinnati Orphan Asylum
- Hopkins Park is a small hillside park in Mt. Auburn
- Inwood Park was created in 1904 after the purchase of a stone quarry. Its pavilion, built in 1910 in Mission style, is one of the earliest buildings extant in Cincinnati's parks.
- Jackson Hill Park
- Glencoe-Auburn Hotel and Glencoe-Auburn Place Row Houses
- Prospect Hill

=== Other notable architecture ===
- Mount Auburn Presbyterian Church, 103 William Howard Taft Road
- Former First District School, 412 Liberty Hill
- Mt. Auburn Cable Railway Building, Corner of Highland and Dorchester
- The William Howard Doane House (Sunny Side), 2223 Auburn Avenue
- Mt. Auburn Baptist Church, 2147 Auburn Avenue
- Adam Riddle House, 2021 Auburn Avenue
- The Henry Powell House, 2209 Auburn Avenue

=== Schools ===
- God's Bible School and College
- Mount Auburn Preparatory Academy
- William Howard Taft Elementary
- Christ College of Nursing

=== Medical institutions ===
- The Christ Hospital
- Planned Parenthood Elizabeth Campbell Surgical Center

== Notable residents ==
- American professional wrestler Jon Moxley and his wife, Canadian interviewer Renee Paquette

== Gallery ==
The cover of a catalog for the Mount Auburn Young Ladies Institute. The landscape of historic Mount Auburn is visible.

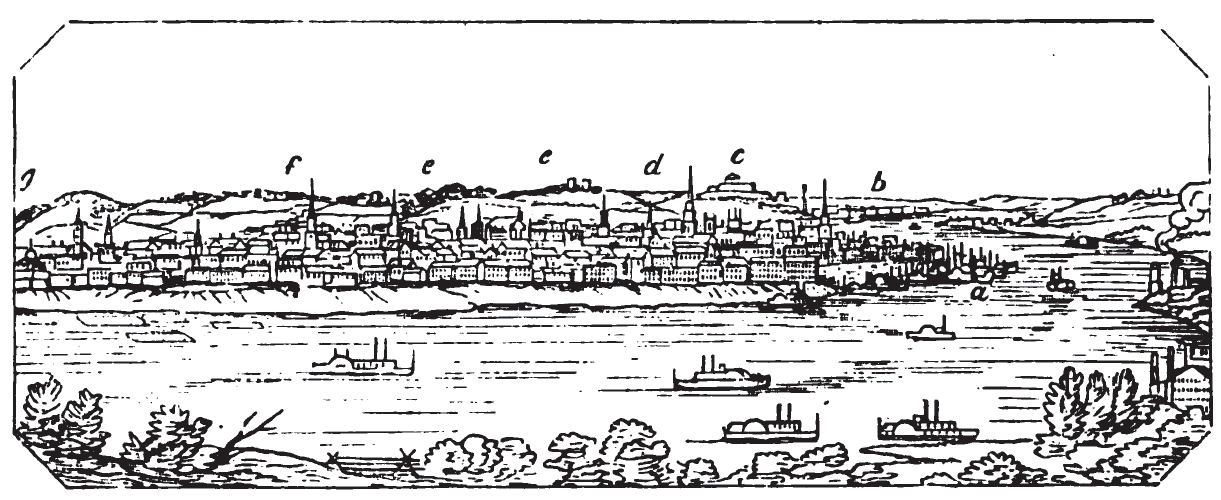
Mount Auburn is seen here as e in this drawing from circa 1861.

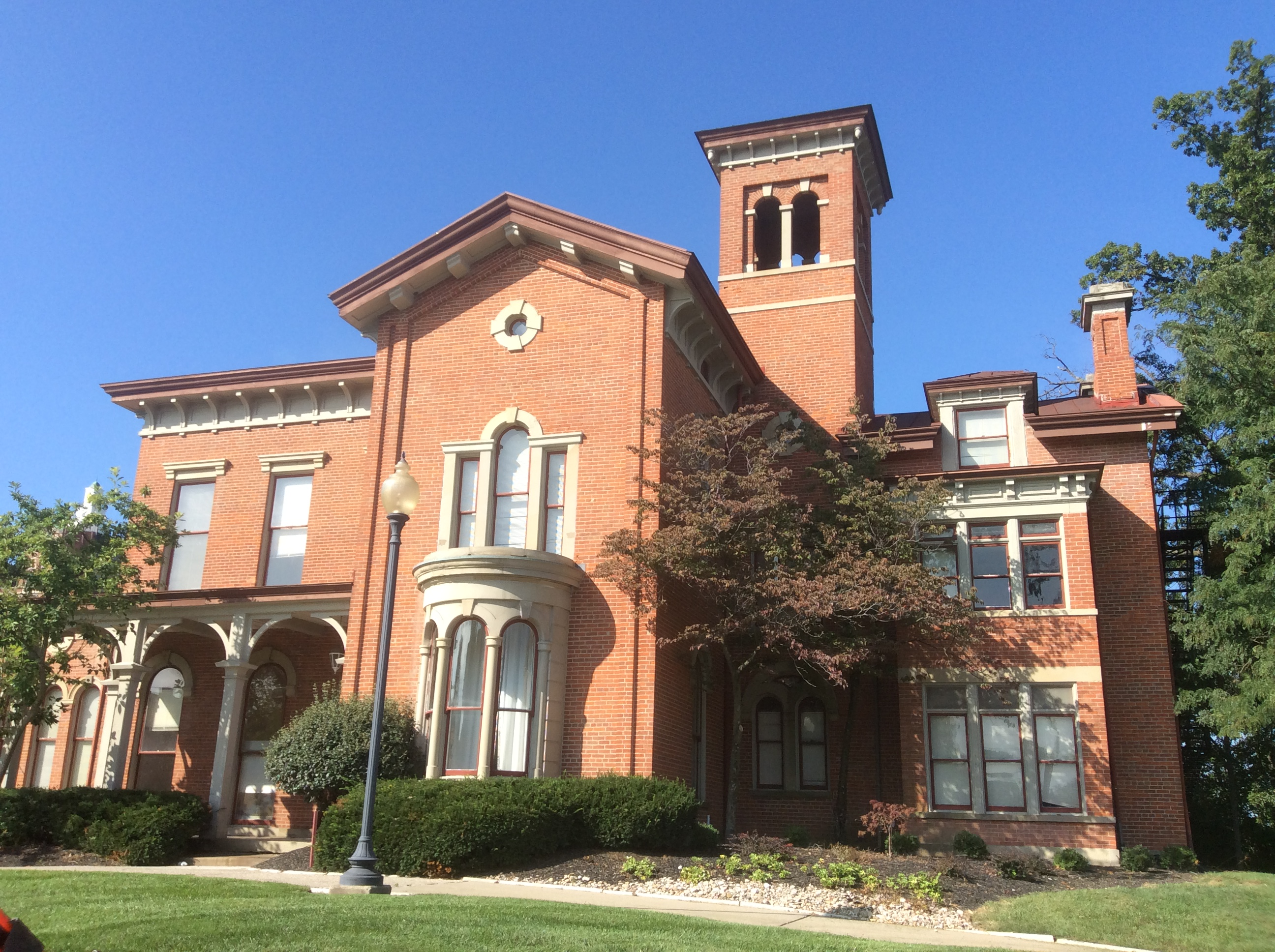
Sunny Side (1850), residence of William Howard Doane
