= National Register of Historic Places listings in downtown Cincinnati =

This is intended to be a complete list of the properties and districts on the National Register of Historic Places in downtown Cincinnati, Ohio, United States. Downtown Cincinnati is defined as being all of the city south of Central Parkway, west of Interstates 71 and 471, and east of Interstate 75. The locations of National Register properties and districts may be seen in an online map.

There are 279 properties and districts listed on the National Register in Cincinnati, including 12 National Historic Landmarks. Downtown Cincinnati includes 63 of these properties and districts, including 5 National Historic Landmarks; the city's remaining properties and districts are listed elsewhere.

This National Park Service list is complete through NPS recent listings posted October 30, 2026.

== Current listings ==
	Name on the Register	Image	Date listed	Location	Description
1	Alkemeyer Commercial Buildings	Alkemeyer Commercial Buildings	December 9, 1980 (#80003034)	19–23 W. Court St. 39°06′21″N 84°30′52″W	
2	Atlas National Bank Building	Atlas National Bank Building	January 10, 2025 (#100011243)	530 Walnut Street. 39°06′08″N 84°30′41″W	
3	Brittany Apartment Building	Brittany Apartment Building	March 3, 1980 (#80003037)	100–104 W. 9th St. 39°06′19″N 84°30′57″W	
4	Brunswick-Balke-Collender Building	Brunswick-Balke-Collender Building	January 24, 2017 (#100000568)	130–132 E. 6th St. 39°06′11″N 84°30′38″W	
5	Building at 620–622 Vine Street	Building at 620–622 Vine Street	February 14, 2018 (#100002121)	620–622 Vine St. 39°06′12″N 84°30′49″W	Also known as the House of Adam Building
6	Carew Tower	Carew Tower	August 5, 1982 (#82003578)	W. 5th St. and Fountain Sq. 39°06′04″N 84°30′42″W	
7	John Church Company Building	John Church Company Building	June 17, 1994 (#94000592)	14–16 E. 4th St. 39°06′01″N 84°30′43″W	
8	Cincinnati and Suburban Telephone Company Building	Cincinnati and Suburban Telephone Company Building	April 20, 1995 (#95000495)	209 W. 7th St. 39°06′10″N 84°31′02″W	
9	Cincinnati City Hall	Cincinnati City Hall	December 11, 1972 (#72001017)	801 Plum St. 39°06′15″N 84°31′10″W	
10	Cincinnati East Manufacturing and Warehouse District	Cincinnati East Manufacturing and Warehouse District	March 12, 1999 (#99000318)	Between E. Court and E. 8th, Broadway and Main Sts. 39°06′19″N 84°30′32″W	
11	Cincinnati Enquirer Building	Cincinnati Enquirer Building	November 13, 1985 (#85002787)	617 Vine St. 39°06′11″N 84°30′49″W	
12	Cincinnati Gymnasium and Athletic Club	Cincinnati Gymnasium and Athletic Club	February 17, 1983 (#83001978)	111 Shillito Pl. 39°06′09″N 84°30′55″W	
13	Court Street Firehouse	Court Street Firehouse	July 18, 1974 (#74001510)	311 W. Court St. 39°06′19″N 84°31′10″W	
14	Courtland Flats	Courtland Flats	December 20, 1984 (#84001046)	117–121 E. Court St. 39°06′23″N 84°30′42″W	
15	Covenant First Presbyterian Church	Covenant First Presbyterian Church	January 29, 1973 (#73001455)	8th and Elm Sts. 39°06′14″N 84°31′02″W	
16	Covington and Cincinnati Suspension Bridge	Covington and Cincinnati Suspension Bridge	May 15, 1975 (#75000786)	Spans the Ohio River between Cincinnati and Covington; 39°05′32″N 84°30′34″W	Extends into Kenton County, Kentucky
17	Cuvier Press Club	Cuvier Press Club	October 26, 1972 (#72001019)	22 Garfield Pl. 39°06′17″N 84°30′52″W	
18	Tyler Davidson Fountain	Tyler Davidson Fountain	October 11, 1979 (#79001854)	5th St. 39°06′05″N 84°30′44″W	
19	H. W. Derby Building	H. W. Derby Building	March 3, 1980 (#80003045)	300 W. 4th St. 39°05′57″N 84°31′03″W	
20	Doctors' Building	Doctors' Building	December 4, 1986 (#86003317)	19 Garfield Pl. 39°06′15″N 84°30′53″W	
21	Duttenhofer Building	Duttenhofer Building	December 26, 2017 (#100001933)	299 E. 6th St. 39°06′11″N 84°30′31″W	
22	East Fourth Street Historic District	East Fourth Street Historic District	February 22, 1988 (#88000078)	123, 127, and 135-137 E. 4th St. 39°06′N 84°31′W	
23	Fenwick Club Annex	Fenwick Club Annex	March 7, 1973 (#73001458)	426 E. 5th St. 39°06′09″N 84°30′21″W	
24	Formica Corporation-Crystal Arcade-Contemporary Arts Center Building		September 19, 2022 (#100007941)	120 East Fourth St. 39°06′01″N 84°30′39″W	
25	First National Bank Building	First National Bank Building	January 24, 2017 (#100000570)	105 E. 4th St. 39°06′01″N 84°30′39″W	
26	Abraham J. Friedlander House	Abraham J. Friedlander House	May 7, 1979 (#79001855)	8 W. 9th St. 39°06′19″N 84°30′51″W	
27	Goodall Building	Goodall Building	February 9, 1984 (#84003710)	324 W. 9th St. 39°06′17″N 84°31′12″W	
28	Gwynne Building	Gwynne Building	August 3, 1979 (#79001856)	6th and Main Sts; 39°06′11″N 84°30′36″W	
29	Hooper Building	Hooper Building	March 3, 1980 (#80003058)	139–151 W. 4th St. 39°05′57″N 84°30′56″W	
30	Hotel Metropole	Hotel Metropole	June 18, 2009 (#09000443)	609 Walnut St. 39°06′11″N 84°30′43″W	Transformed into the 21c Museum Hotel
31	Ingalls Building	Ingalls Building	March 7, 1975 (#75001418)	6 E. 4th St. 39°06′00″N 84°30′45″W	
32	Krippendorf-Dittman Company	Krippendorf-Dittman Company	March 3, 1980 (#80003061)	628 Sycamore St. 39°06′14″N 84°30′30″W	
33	Lombardy Apartment Building	Lombardy Apartment Building	March 3, 1980 (#80003062)	318–326 W. 4th St. 39°05′57″N 84°31′05″W	
34	Lytle Park Historic District	Lytle Park Historic District	March 26, 1976 (#76001435)	Roughly bounded by 3rd, 5th, Sycamore, Commercial Sq., and Butler Sts. 39°06′04″N 84°30′19″W	
35	Main and Third Street Cluster	Main and Third Street Cluster	July 15, 1983 (#83001984)	300–302, 304–306 Main St., and 208–210 E. 3rd St.; also 308–318 Main St. 39°05′58″N 84°30′31″W	308–318 Main represents a boundary increase of November 14, 2012, the Main-Third Street Buildings
36	MAJESTIC	MAJESTIC	January 3, 1980 (#89002456)	Ohio River below Central Bridge; 39°05′49″N 84°30′17″W	Originally listed on the NRHP as "SHOWBOAT MAJESTIC"; declared a National Historic Landmark under this name on December 20, 1989
37	Mercantile Library Building	Mercantile Library Building	September 20, 2021 (#100006914)	414 Walnut St. 39°06′03″N 84°30′40″W	
38	Newport and Cincinnati Bridge	Newport and Cincinnati Bridge	April 17, 2001 (#01000364)	Spans the Ohio River; 39°05′41″N 84°29′40″W	Also known as the Newport Southbank Bridge; extends into Campbell County, Kentucky
39	Ninth Street Historic District	Ninth Street Historic District	November 25, 1980 (#80003067)	9th St. between Vine and Plum Sts. 39°06′17″N 84°30′59″W	
40	Palace Hotel	Palace Hotel	March 3, 1980 (#80003071)	6th and Vine Sts. 39°06′09″N 84°30′49″W	
41	Palace Theatre	Palace Theatre	March 24, 1980 (#80004067)	12 E. 6th St. 39°06′09″N 84°30′46″W	
42	Phoenix Building/Cincinnati Club	Phoenix Building/Cincinnati Club	January 11, 1985 (#85000068)	30 Garfield Pl. and 812 Race St. 39°06′17″N 84°30′55″W	
43	Phoenix Club	Phoenix Club	March 3, 1980 (#80003073)	9th and Race Sts. 39°06′18″N 84°30′55″W	
44	Plum Street Temple	Plum Street Temple	December 27, 1972 (#72001021)	8th and Plum Sts. 39°06′13″N 84°31′05″W	Now known as Isaac M. Wise Temple
45	H. & S. Pogue Service Building	H. & S. Pogue Service Building	January 23, 2026 (#100012608)	310 Race Street; 39°05′56″N 84°30′50″W	
46	Police Station No. 2	Police Station No. 2	May 18, 1981 (#81000655)	314 Broadway; 39°06′01″N 84°30′20″W	
47	Power Building	Power Building	March 5, 1999 (#99000276)	224 E. 8th St. 39°06′19″N 84°30′32″W	
48	Provident Savings Bank and Trust Co.	Provident Savings Bank and Trust Co.	September 6, 2018 (#100002878)	630–632 Vine St. 39°06′13″N 84°30′49″W	
49	Race Street Historic District	Race Street Historic District	August 4, 1995 (#95000878)	Roughly along Race, W. 6th and W. 7th Sts. and Shillito Pl. 39°06′11″N 84°30′54″W	
50	Reakirt Building	Reakirt Building	January 24, 2017 (#100000569)	126–128 E. 6th St. 39°06′11″N 84°30′39″W	
51	Nathaniel Ropes Building	Nathaniel Ropes Building	September 30, 1982 (#82003585)	917 Main St. 39°06′22″N 84°30′40″W	
52	St. Francis Xavier Church	St. Francis Xavier Church	July 18, 1980 (#80003087)	607 Sycamore St. 39°06′12″N 84°30′33″W	
53	St. Peter-In-Chains Cathedral	St. Peter-In-Chains Cathedral	January 18, 1973 (#73001469)	325 W. 8th St. 39°06′13″N 84°31′11″W	
54	Saxony Apartment Building	Saxony Apartment Building	March 3, 1980 (#80003083)	105–111 W. 9th St. 39°06′19″N 84°30′56″W	
55	Taft Museum	Taft Museum	January 29, 1973 (#73001470)	316 Pike St. 39°06′09″N 84°30′12″W	Also known as Baum-Taft House
56	Terrace Plaza Hotel	Terrace Plaza Hotel	August 24, 2017 (#100001493)	15 W. 6th St. 39°06′09″N 84°30′52″W	
57	Times-Star Building	Times-Star Building	November 25, 1983 (#83004309)	800 Broadway; 39°06′21″N 84°30′24″W	
58	Traction Company Building	Traction Company Building	July 3, 2017 (#100001270)	432 Walnut St. 39°06′04″N 84°30′41″W	
59	Underwriters Salvage Corps	Underwriters Salvage Corps	July 15, 1982 (#82003589)	110–112 E. 8th St. 39°06′18″N 84°30′42″W	
60	Union Trust Building	Union Trust Building	August 29, 2008 (#08000802)	36 E. 4th St. 39°06′00″N 84°30′42″W	
61	United States Post Office and Court House	United States Post Office and Court House	April 28, 2015 (#15000184)	100 E. 5th St. 39°06′06″N 84°30′37″W	Now known as the Potter Stewart United States Courthouse.
62	West Fourth Street Historic District	West Fourth Street Historic District	August 13, 1976 (#79001861)	Bounded by Central Ave, W. 5th, Plum, and McFarland Sts.; also W. 5th and Perry Sts. between Central Ave. and Plum St., 4th St. between Central Ave. and Race St.; also 1–35 and 2–18 W. 4th St.; also 309 Vine St. 39°05′58″N 84°31′06″W	Second, third, and fourth sets of boundaries represent boundary increases
63	Young Women's Christian Association of Cincinnati	Young Women's Christian Association of Cincinnati	September 16, 1982 (#82003591)	9th and Walnut Sts. 39°06′19″N 84°30′43″W	

== Former listings ==
	Name on the Register	Image	Date listed	Date removed	Location	Description
1	Albee Theatre		July 24, 1972 (#72001016)	July 20, 1977	12 E. 5th St.	
2	Allen Temple		July 7, 1975 (#75001414)	July 6, 1981	538 Broadway	
3	Wesley Chapel Methodist Church		January 16, 1970 (#70000922)	March 6, 1972	320 E. 5th St.	Demolished in February 1972.

== See also ==
- List of National Historic Landmarks in Ohio
- National Register of Historic Places listings in Cincinnati, Ohio
