= The Alexandra (Cincinnati, Ohio) =

- U.S. National Register of Historic Places
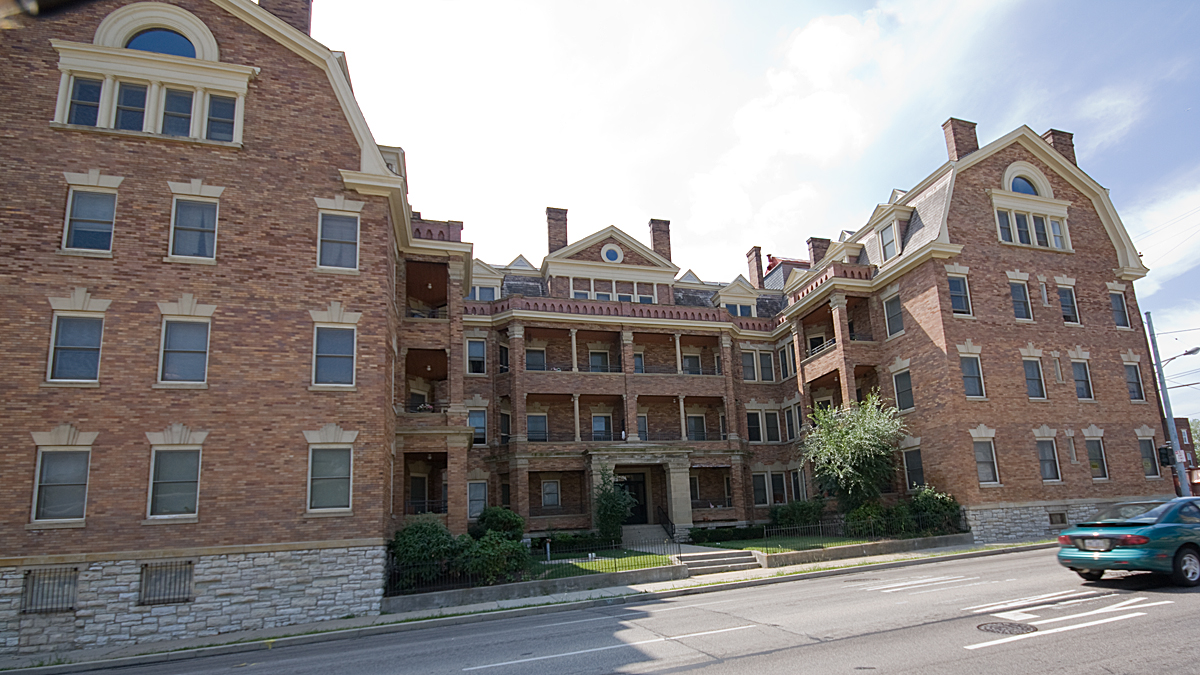
- Front of the building on Taft Road

- Location within Ohio Location within the United States
- Location: 921 E. William H. Taft Rd., Cincinnati, Ohio
- Coordinates: 39°7′38″N 84°29′21″W
- Area: Less than 1 acre (0.40 ha)
- Built: 1904
- Architect: Joseph G. Steinkamp & Brother; Thomas J. Emery's Sons
- Architectural style: Dutch Colonial Revival
- NRHP reference No.: 97001223
- Added to NRHP: October 17, 1997

The Alexandra is a historic apartment building located on Gilbert Avenue in the Walnut Hills neighborhood of Cincinnati, Ohio, United States. Constructed in 1904 as the neighborhood's first large apartment building, it was one of many such buildings constructed for the real estate management firm of Thomas J. Emery's Sons. It has been named a historic site.

== History ==
Cincinnati's traditional single-family houses were sufficient for city residents into the 1860s, but rapid postwar growth caused land prices to rise, and apartment living became more desirable even for the city's wealthier residents. At first, downtown was the favored location for these developments, with many lining West Fourth and West Ninth Streets. However, the rise of Thomas J. Emery's Sons saw a rapid increase in development in other neighborhoods: although Emery had participated in the downtown apartment boom, constructing the Lombardy Flats on Fourth Street to a Samuel Hannaford design, the firm made itself Cincinnati's leading apartment developer by building high-quality buildings along streetcar lines in the hillside neighborhoods above downtown, including Walnut Hills. Most of their buildings, including the Alexandra, were designed by the firm of Joseph G. Steinkamp & Brother. When constructed in 1904, the Alexandra was Cincinnati's first large apartment building constructed in a hillside neighborhood and the largest apartment building anywhere in the city. Its desirability was increased by its location near the end of the Gilbert Avenue streetcar line at the street's intersection with William Howard Taft, a significant east-west road, just one city block north of the commercial neighborhood of Peebles' Corner.

== Architecture ==
Built of brick with a foundation of limestone and covered with a slate roof, the Alexandra is a Dutch Colonial Revival building constructed on the edge of the street, with no setback. The first through third stories are pierced with regular rectangular windows, while the fourth story, constricted by the gambrel roof, is illuminated by a mix of rectangular and semicircular arched windows, placed both in the peaks of the gables and in dormers. Porches are provided on all stories, and the Gilbert Avenue end (significantly shorter than the Taft-facing northern front) is interrupted by a central gable and additional porches. The interior was originally divided into fifty-four separate apartments.

== Preservation ==
In 1997, the Alexandra was listed on the National Register of Historic Places, qualifying both because of its architectural integrity and its importance in local history. It is one of numerous Register-listed locations in its section of Walnut Hills, along with the core of Peebles Corner to the south, the Cummins School and the tower of Walnut Hills United Presbyterian Church just to the northwest, and the Park, Verona (also Emery-owned), and Ransley Apartments just to the southeast. The same designation has been given to several other Emery apartment buildings, including the Brittany, Lombardy, and Saxony (all downtown), the Parkside in Clifton, and Haddon Hall and the Somerset in Avondale. In addition to its federal landmark status, grant-funded renovations have improved the building's condition: in 2004, an office of the Federal Reserve Bank of Cleveland announced that a project to strengthen Walnut Hills and other impoverished Cincinnati neighborhoods had funded a newly completed project to convert the Alexandra into eighty-three units of housing for the elderly.
