= Friedlander House =

Friedlander House may refer to:

- Abraham J. Friedlander House, Cincinnati, Ohio
- Fred Krause House, Hazen, North Dakota, known also as the Joe Friedlander House, NRHP-listed

== See also ==
- Leo Friedlander Studio, White Plains, New York, NRHP-listed
