= East Fourth Street Historic District =

East Fourth Street Historic District may refer to:

- East Fourth Street Historic District (Cincinnati, Ohio)
- East 4th Street District (Cleveland)
