= Textile Building =

Textile Building may refer to:

- Textile Building (Cincinnati, OH)
- Textile Building (Starkville, Mississippi), see National Register of Historic Places listings in Oktibbeha County, Mississippi
- Textile Building (Tribeca), a historic 1901 building in the Tribeca section of New York City
- The Textile Building at Clemson College, now Godfrey Hall at Clemson University's Campus of Clemson University
- The New Textile Building in Toronto, Canada, designed by Benjamin Brown (architect)
