= Young Women's Christian Association of Cincinnati =

- U.S. National Register of Historic Places
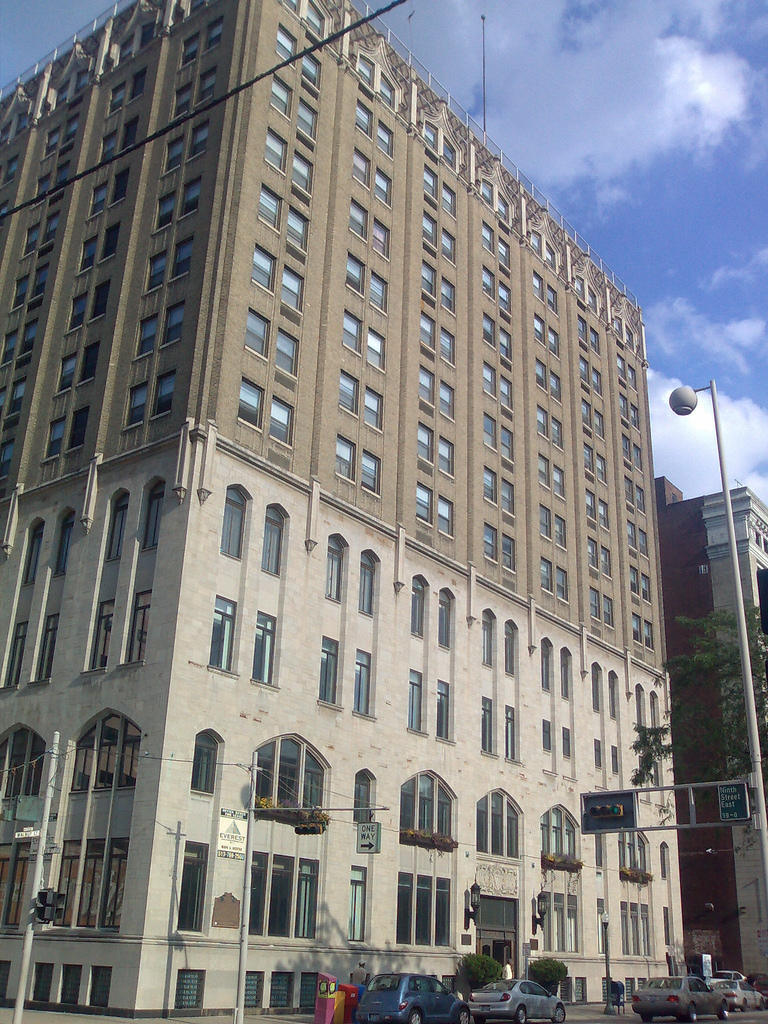
- Location: 898 Walnut St., Cincinnati, Ohio
- Coordinates: 39.1054°N 84.5121°W
- Architect: Panzer & Martin Rendigs
- NRHP reference No.: 82003591
- Added to NRHP: September 16, 1982

Young Women's Christian Association of Cincinnati is a historic building in Cincinnati, Ohio. It was listed in the National Register of Historic Places on September 16, 1982.

The Young Women's Christian Association of Cincinnati was founded in 1868.

The building hosts an active YWCA fitness facility. It is located Downtown Cincinnati at Ninth Street and Walnut.

== See also ==
- List of YWCA buildings
- National Register of Historic Places listings in downtown Cincinnati
