= Gibson House (Cincinnati) =

Former hotel in Cincinnati, Ohio, U.S.

Coordinates: 39°06′02″N 84°30′44″W

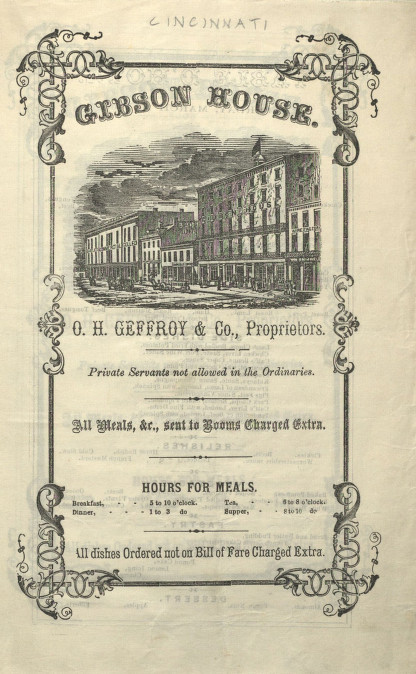
Gibson House menu on March 11, 1860

The Gibson House was a hotel in Cincinnati, Ohio. Established in 1849 by Scottish immigrant Peter Gibson, it was one of the city's foremost hotels until its destruction in 1912. Its replacement was the Hotel Gibson, a 15-story, neoclassical high-rise designed by local architect Gustave W. Drach. The Hotel Gibson was purchased by Sheraton in 1950 and renamed the Sheraton-Gibson Hotel. It was closed in 1974 and demolished in 1977 as part of a renovation of Fountain Square.

== History ==
Early advertisement for the Gibson House

The Gibson House opened around February 1849 on the west side of Walnut Street between Fourth and Fifth Street in downtown Cincinnati. The first proprietors were J.K. and D.V. Bennett. It was considered the "best house in the city" within a year. The hotel was financed by Peter Gibson, a Scottish immigrant who was born October 20, 1802, and emigrated to America in 1831. Many wall decorations and frescoes were painted by the artist William A. Thien, who lived in Cincinnati for a time.

During the first season of professional baseball, on several occasions the fans would meet the Cincinnati Red Stockings baseball team and escort them to the Gibson House where celebrations and banquets were held. The House was often used to greet prominent individuals who visited Cincinnati, such as Rutherford B. Hayes, who visited Cincinnati on September 15, 1877.

Plans for a new hotel to replace the Gibson House were announced in 1899. The original Gibson House was demolished in 1912 after being destroyed by fire. The Hotel Gibson was built as its replacement the following year. The new hotel was designed in the neoclassical style by Cincinnati architect Gustave W. Drach. Located next to Fountain Square, the hotel initially stood 12 stories tall and contained over 800 rooms, but was later expanded to 15 stories with 1000 rooms. The hotel offered various guest amenities, including a bowling alley, a barber shop, and a print shop.

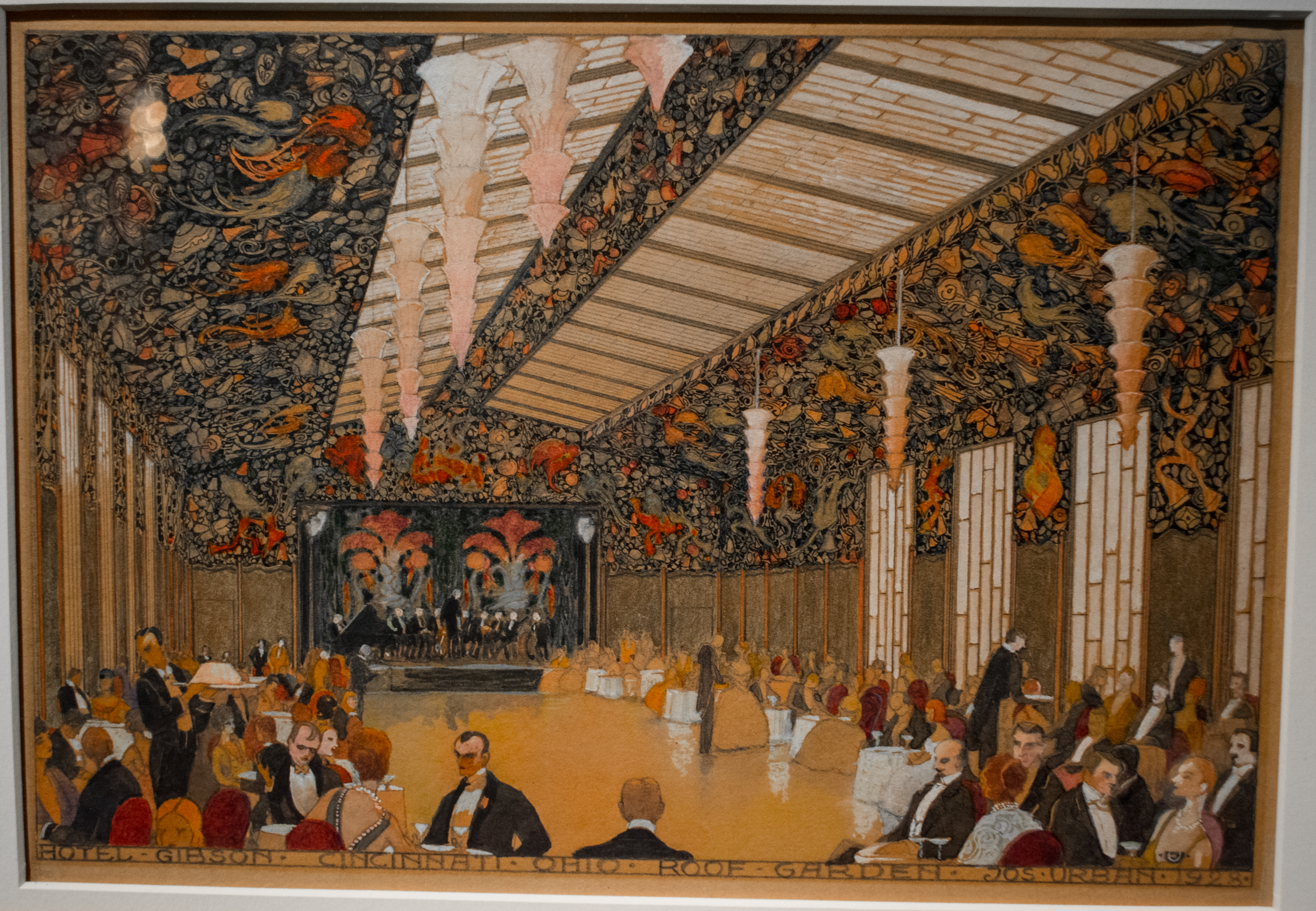
Joseph Urban's design for the roof garden

Ralph Hitz became the hotel's manager in 1927 and ordered $300,000 ($5.56 million in 2025) in improvements, half of which was spent on a roof garden designed by Joseph Urban. Hitz's leadership of the Hotel Gibson brought him national attention, and he subsequently became the manager of numerous prominent hotels. During World War II, the Hotel Gibson was used as an internment camp for German-Americans.

The hotel struggled financially in the late 1940s. Competition from the Terrace Plaza Hotel caused the Hotel Gibson to renovate many of its rooms, straining its finances. The Hotel Employees and Restaurant Employees Union demanded higher wages for the hotel's employees, and in 1948, the hotel agreed to implement a 40-hour work week and give raises totaling $100,000 per year to its employees. Room rates were increased to pay for labor expenses. In 1949, the hotel struggled further due to its high rates and competition from hotels that offered air conditioning, which the Gibson lacked. In November of that year, it took out a second mortgage worth $700,000. In June 1950, the Gibson was purchased by Sheraton, who invested millions of dollars in renovations and successfully revitalized the hotel. It was subsequently known as the Sheraton-Gibson Hotel.

The Sheraton-Gibson hosted numerous notable guests. Among them was future United States President John F. Kennedy, who stayed there during his 1960 presidential campaign. President Lyndon B. Johnson and his staff occupied an entire floor of the hotel during a governors' conference in 1968.

In 1967, Sheraton was acquired by the ITT Corporation, which did not regard maintaining the Sheraton-Gibson as a priority. Meanwhile, the city of Cincinnati sought to demolish the block that the hotel occupied as part of its remodeling of Fountain Square. The Sheraton-Gibson closed on July 15, 1974. The hotel was demolished in 1977 to make way for the US Bank Tower and Westin Hotel, which was completed in 1981.
