= Hooper Building =

- U.S. National Register of Historic Places
- U.S. Historic district – Contributing property
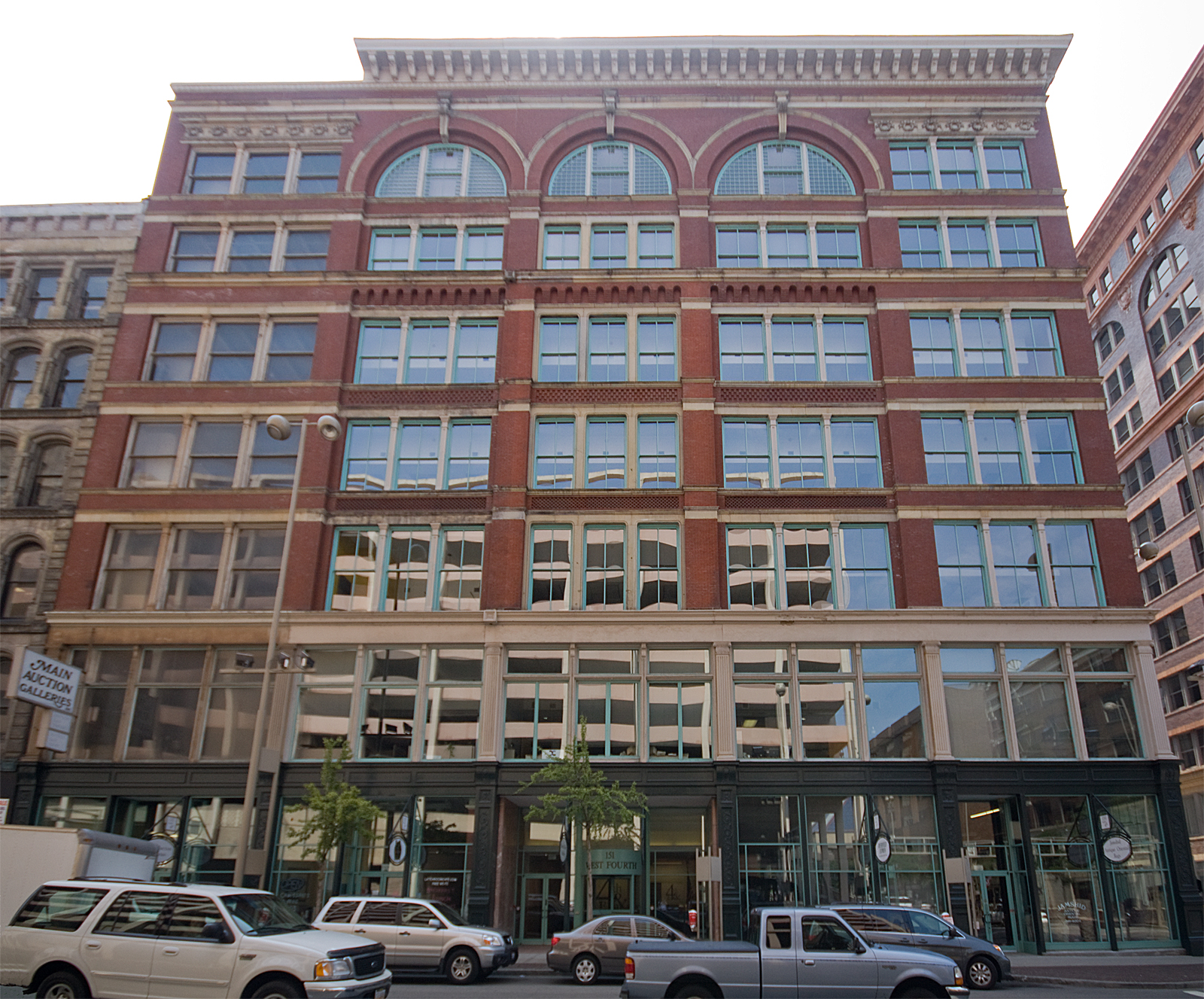
- Front of the building

- Location within Ohio Location within the United States
- Location: 139–151 W. 4th St., Cincinnati, Ohio
- Coordinates: 39°5′57″N 84°30′56″W
- Area: Less than 1 acre (0.40 ha)
- Built: 1893
- Architect: Samuel Hannaford & Sons
- Architectural style: Queen Anne
- Part of: West Fourth Street Historic District (ID76001443)
- MPS: Samuel Hannaford and Sons TR in Hamilton County
- NRHP reference No.: 80003058
- Added to NRHP: March 3, 1980

The Hooper Building is a historic building in downtown Cincinnati, Ohio. The seven-story structure was designed by architect Samuel Hannaford in the Queen Anne style. Located within the West Fourth Street Historic District, the building itself is also listed on the National Register of Historic Places. The building was conceived by book salesman H. W. Derby and built with funding from John Church Company president William Hooper, who became its namesake. Originally built in 1885, the Hooper Building was destroyed by a fire in 1891 and rebuilt in 1893. It served as a commercial property until it was converted into an apartment building under the name Textile Lofts in 2026.

== History ==
=== First Hooper Building ===
In the mid-1880s, book salesman H. W. Derby sought to transform Cincinnati into a major hub for the book industry. As part of this plan, he arranged for the construction of a building at the southeast corner of Fourth and Elm Streets that would serve as his headquarters, succeeding the old H.W. Derby Building. Derby purchased the land and recruited William Hooper to assist with the construction. Hooper was president of the John Church Company, which sold musical instruments and printed music. Hooper announced his intention to construct "the best modern business building in the city".

Groundbreaking occurred in September 1884. The building was in an advanced state of construction when it was damaged by a storm on August 22, 1885. On August 27, the Marion Daily Star reported that publisher Harper & Brothers had arranged to make the building its western depot for school books. Derby's plan to use the building as a headquarters for the book trade failed to materialize, and Hooper, who had invested large amounts of his own money into the project, assumed ownership of the building. Labeled the "Derby Building" for most of its construction, it was renamed the "Hooper Building" prior to opening in honor of Hooper. "Finishing touches" were being applied to the structure on October 17. The cost of both the land and the building was ultimately about $250,000. Wholesale dry goods company Shipley, Doisy, & Co., which had signed a lease to the entire building for $18,000 a year, was slated to move to the structure on October 22.

Shipley, Doisy, & Co. went out of business in December 1886. The Hooper Building sat largely vacant for years. By March 15, 1889, A. E. Burkhardt, "one of Cincinnati's most enterprising, liberal and successful merchants", had secured a twenty-year lease to the building with the privilege of purchase. At the time, a "small portion" of the structure was occupied by a wholesale clothier, the lease of which was close to expiration. Burkhardt moved his fur clothing business into the building on October 15 and invested $75,000 in alterations to it. The original Hooper Building was destroyed by a fire on July 8, 1891.

=== Second Hooper Building ===
On October 7, 1891, Burkhardt reached an agreement with Henry Hooper, who owned a perpetual lease to the structure, to reconstruct the Hooper Building. Burkhardt had separately made a deal with Henry A. Jones, manager of the Fosdick estate that owned the nearby Steinerts store, to incorporate the Fosdick building into the new structure. General Seasongood, who owned a building operated by the Pape brothers, also signified his desire to have his structure made continuous with the new Hooper Building. The new Hooper Building, built on the same site as the original, was complete by February 1893, with the John Church Company slated to move to the building shortly after opening.

In 1976, much of West 4th Street was designated a historic district, the West Fourth Street Historic District, and added to the National Register of Historic Places. Although the district's boundaries did not include the Hooper Building, it was expanded eastward in 1979, and the Hooper was included as a contributing property in the larger district. One year later, the building was individually listed on the Register, due to its well-preserved historic architecture. Dozens of other properties in Cincinnati, including the Brittany Apartment Building, were added to the Register at the same time as part of a multiple property submission of buildings designed by Samuel Hannaford.

By 1986, Fourth & Elm Associates Limited Partnership had sold the Hooper Building to California-based Westcap Heritage Investors Cincinnati. Westcap began renovating the structure into luxury office space, but only completed a third of the project before stalling due to financial difficulties. Fourth & Elm Associates, which held a mortgage on the property, foreclosed on it in early 1987 and scheduled a public auction for August. The auction was intended to help pay off the $1.68 million that Westcap owed Fourth & Elm Associates and the $518,000 that it owed Schumacher-Dugan Construction Inc. The August auction was called off after Westcap filed for federal bankruptcy. The vacant Hooper Building was valued at $2.4 million by the county at the time. Larry Schumacher of West Chester, Ohio-based Tipton Associates purchased the building at a sheriff's sale in March 1988. By July, Tipton was partnering with Schumacher-Dugan to renovate the building, creating 100,000 square feet of "Class A" office space. Construction was slated to begin the following month and conclude by December 1.

In 2015, the Hooper Building was purchased by Ashley Commercial Group of Edgewood, Kentucky from Schumacher-Dugan for $3 million. The buyer stated that they "like[d] the location" and did not intend to make major changes to the structure. The building was about 50% occupied at the time. In March 2021, Chicago-based coworking company Expansive renovated the upper floors of the building for coworking and private office use.

=== Textile Lofts ===
By 2024, the ground floor was occupied by two dining venues, though the office space in the Hooper Building was mostly vacant. In May of that year, the building was purchased by Washington, D.C.-based developer Bernstein Cos. with a mortgage of $2.7 millon. Bernstein announced plans to convert the structure into a residential building. The plan, which was projected to cost $33.6 million, called for 102 market-rate apartment units, a gym, shared working space, and 150 storage units. Hooper Building residents would also have access to the common facilities of the nearby Textile Building, which Bernstein had converted into a residential property in 2022. In exchange, Textile Building residents would have access to the storage units in the Hooper Building.

"Watch the iconic Hooper Building transform", November 2025

In November 2024, the Cincinnati City Council approved a 15-year tax abatement for the project. The following month, Bernstein received the full $3.35 million in tax credits that it requested from the Ohio Historic Tax Credit Program for the conversion. Bernstein was also granted $5.2 million from the federal government for historic preservation. Bernstein hired HGC Construction as the general contractor and the RDA Group as the architect. Truist and Bainbridge Capital Real Estate provided financing. Bernstein filed a commencement notice for the conversion on April 28, 2025. On May 1, Cincinnati issued a permit to convert the building into a mixed-use space, and construction began later that month. The conversion was scheduled to complete by summer 2026.

After 15 months of construction, the Hooper Building reopened as Textile Lofts in July 2026. As planned, the redesigned buidling featured 102 apartments. Amenities included a lounge, coworking space, a gym, a sauna, a dog wash, and 150 storage units. The two ground-level retail units were retained. The combination of the interiors of three different buildings into one structure resulted in Textile Lofts having a "creative" floor plan with unorthodox room layouts.

== Architecture ==
Built of brick on a foundation of limestone, the seven-story Hooper Building features a symmetrical facade designed in a variant of the Queen Anne style. Among its most prominent themes are its division into five bays on both the front and the western side, with the three central bays being recessed from the corners. On the top story, the normal lintels give way to an arcade decorated with limestone keystones carven in the shapes of scrolls. Masonry courses divide the building into several vertical components: the second and third stories are separated by a large beltcourse, while lintels are placed throughout the facade.
