= Gustave W. Drach =

American architect

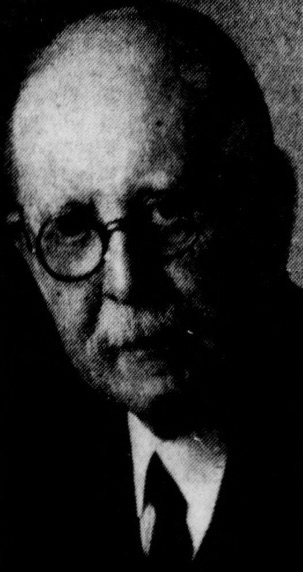
- Undated photograph of Drach
- Born: November 26, 1861; Cincinnati, Ohio
- Died: July 18, 1940 (aged 78); Cincinnati, Ohio
- Other name: Gustav W. Drach
- Education: Massachusetts Institute of Technology
- Occupation: Architect
- Years active: 1883-1940

Gustave W. Drach (November 26, 1861 – July 18, 1940), also spelled Gustav W. Drach, was an American architect. A native of Cincinnati, Ohio, he was a prolific designer in the Cincinnati area in the late 19th and early 20th centuries.

== Biography ==
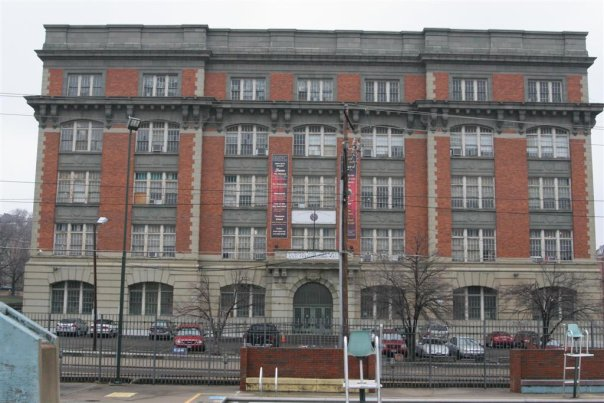
The 1910 iteration of Woodward High School, designed by Drach. Drach was a graduate of an earlier version of the school

Drach was born in Cincinnati to French immigrant parents on November 26, 1861. In his childhood, Drach's family lived near the city workhouse in Camp Washington. His father worked as a liquor dealer and tavern owner. Drach and his three siblings, Cecilia, Louis, and Adolph, were all educated in Cincinnati. He attended an early iteration of Cincinnati's Woodward High School, graduating in 1879. He also attended the Ohio Mechanics Institute (OMI). In 1880, he received a bronze medal from OMI's architectural department, which was its highest honor. In 1883, he graduated from the School of Architecture at the Massachusetts Institute of Technology (MIT), becoming one of the first Cincinnatians to attend MIT's architecture school.

Drach was employed by Boston-based architectural firm Cummings and Sears for a year before finding employment with Herter Brothers in New York City in 1884. From 1884 to 1885, he worked for George W. Rapp in Cincinnati. In 1885, he began practicing architecture under his own name, which he would continue to do for the remainder of his life.

Drach designed numerous structures in the Cincinnati area in the late 19th and early 20th centuries, becoming one of the most productive architects in the city at the time. He also designed buildings in other cities, including Dayton, Ohio and Birmingham, Alabama. His portfolio included schools, medical facilities, single-family homes, and industrial buildings. Drach was an early adopter of reinforced concrete, employing it in his own work prior to the construction of Elzner & Richardson’s Ingalls Building, which became the world’s first reinforced concrete skyscraper in 1903. Drach made use of a variety of architectural styles, including Queen Anne, Commercial, and Renaissance Revival. His projects often fused innovative techniques with "relative stylistic restraint".

From 1885 until 1889, Drach was a member of the Western Association of Architects. After the Western Association merged with the American Institute of Architects (AIA) in 1889, Drach joined the AIA and became a fellow. Drach served as president of the Cincinnati chapter of the AIA. He presented at Cincinnati AIA exhibitions in 1901, 1902, 1903, and 1908. The Cincinnati Water Works was his showcase project in 1902 and 1903, while a drawing of the new Woodward High School represented him in 1908. Drach further served as vice president of the Ohio State Association of Architects, a union of five Ohio-based chapters of the AIA headquartered at the Ohio State University in Columbus.

In the 1890s, the affluent suburb and future Cincinnati neighborhood of Mornington changed its name to Hyde Park at Drach's suggestion.

Drach was active in local politics. He served as an assistant secretary for an 1897 convention of the Hamilton County Republican Party. In 1907, he campaigned on behalf of the municipal City Party, which sought to fight the rule of political bosses in Cincinnati. The following year, he served on the executive committee of the Roosevelt Republican Club, which campaigned for William Howard Taft in the 1908 presidential election.

In 1886, Drach married Cincinnatian Martha Heinrichsdorf. The couple had two sons, Edgar and Karl. Drach lived in the Clifton neighborhood for much of his adult life. By 1933, he was residing in St. Bernard. Martha Drach died on July 8, 1939 at the age of 78. Drach himself died of tuberculosis on July 18, 1940, also aged 78. He continued working until nearly the end of his life, only closing his office in Cincinnati's Union Trust Building shortly before entering the hospital. He died in the Hamilton County Tuberculosis Sanatorium, which he had designed.

== Notable works ==
- Textile Building (1906), downtown Cincinnati
- Woodward High School (1910), Pendleton, Cincinnati
- Hotel Gibson (1913), downtown Cincinnati
- Good Samaritan Hospital (1915), CUF, Cincinnati
- Neil House (1925), Columbus, Ohio
- Good Samaritan Hospital (1932), Dayton, Ohio
