= Harry Hake =

American architect

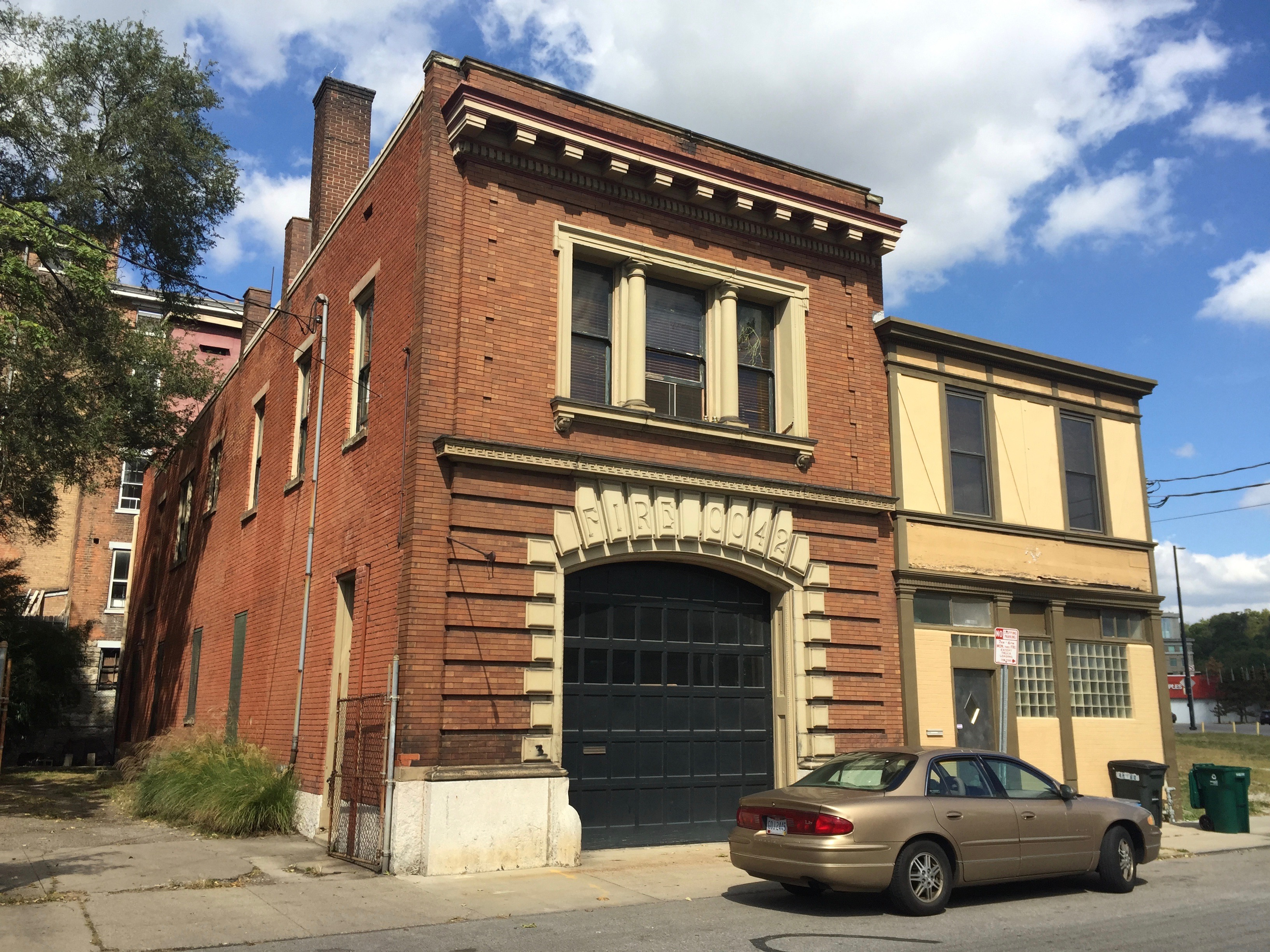
Old Pendleton Fire Station designed by Harry Hake Sr (1906)

Harry Hake Sr. (1871 – 1955) was a prominent American architect in Cincinnati, Ohio at the turn of the 20th century. His son Harry Hake Jr. and grandson Harry Hake III were also prominent architects and partners in his firm, which at various times was named Hake & Son, Hake & Hake, Jr., and Hake & Partners.

== Biography ==
Harry Hake followed a training at the Ohio Mechanics Institute and the Art Academy of Cincinnati. He extended his chief draftsman training by working with William Martin Aiken, Lucien F. Plympton, and George L. Rapp. He was listed as an architect since 1897. His firm became Hake & Son in 1945, Hake & Hake, Jr. in 1948, Hake & Partners in 1971.

== Works ==
- Crosley Field
- Cincinnati and Suburban Telephone Company Building (Art Deco)
- Cincinnati East Manufacturing and Warehouse District
- Ohio Judicial Center
- Power Building
- Queen City Club (English Renaissance)
- Western Southern Life Insurance Co. Headquarters (Cincinnati, Ohio) (Greek Revival)

Harry Hake is also listed as the architect on the tomb of former U.S.president William Henry Harrison. The tomb is located in North Bend, Ohio west of Cincinnati on Hwy US 50.
