= Good Samaritan Hospital (Dayton) =

Coordinates: 39°47′16″N 84°13′59″W

Geography
- Location: Dayton, Ohio, USA

Organisation
- Care system: Private
- Type: Academic, acute care short stay
- Affiliated university: Boonshoft School of Medicine of Wright State University

Services
- Standards: JCAHO accreditation Magnet status
- Beds: 577

History
- Founded: 1932
- Closed: July 23, 2018

Links
- Website: http://www.goodsamdayton.org
- Lists: Hospitals in Ohio
- Other links: List of hospitals in the United States

Good Samaritan Hospital was a full-service hospital on the west side of Dayton, Ohio. The hospital closed in 2018. Prior to closing, the hospital had 3,300 employees and 577 beds. Good Samaritan Hospital had won numerous awards and was constantly recognized for its excellence in health care delivery and safety by places such as U.S. News & World Report, HealthGrades, and others. The hospital was a teaching hospital with the Boonshoft School of Medicine at Wright State University as the affiliated university. The hospital was a part of Premier Health Partners. The Dayton Heart and Vascular Hospital was owned by Good Samaritan Hospital and was located on the hospital's main campus.

On January 17, 2018, it was announced Good Samaritan Hospital would close by the end of the year. The final patients were discharged on July 20, 2018. and the hospital officially closed on July 23, 2018. The closure of the hospital was considered highly controversial due to its status as the only hospital within Dayton's impoverished and largely black west side. A complaint regarding the closure was filed with the U.S. Department of Health and the closure was met with a number of protests. In November 2018, the scope of the civil rights complaint was expanded, alleging that Premier Health practices a pattern of discriminatory investment in regards to its placement of properties. Upon completion of the complaint investigation, the Office for Civil Rights found no civil rights violations in the hospital closure.

== History ==
In 1928, the city of Dayton partnered with the Sisters of Charity in Cincinnati to raise $1 million to construct the hospital. Cincinnati architect Gustave W. Drach was hired to design the building. The hospital was completed four years later. In 1975, the hospital expanded by adding its south wing. In 2003, Samaritan Pavilion was opened and included an emergency department, intensive care unit, and two additional surgical suites.

The hospital opened Samaritan North Health Center in 1995, at the time the largest outpatient care center in the country. Good Samaritan Hospital acquired Dayton Heart Hospital in May 2008.

With the closure its main campus, Samaritan North Health Center was re-designated as Miami Valley Hospital North, a branch location of Miami Valley Hospital.

Abatement work on the inside of the hospital began in early March 2019, with exterior demolition planned to begin in April and continue through the first quarter of 2020.

== Awards and recognition ==
From 2009 to 2012 the hospital received the following HealthGrades honors:

- 2009–2011 Distinguished Hospital Award for Clinical Excellence
- 2010–2012 Emergency Medicine Excellence Award
- 2009–2011 Pulmonary Care Excellence Award
- 2011 Critical Care Excellence Award

In 2012, the hospital was rated in the Top 10 in Ohio for Cardiology by HealthGrades. HealthGrades also placed the hospital at five-star rated in cardiology services, treatment of heart attack & heart failure, treatment of pneumonia, treatment of sepsis, treatment of respiratory failure.

In 2006 and 2008, they were received the Outstanding Achievement Award by the American College of Surgeons Commission on Cancer.

The hospital was rated #1 in Ohio for vascular surgery and best in Dayton for joint replacement surgery in 2010.

Good Samaritan Hospital was named one of the nation's 100 top hospitals for cardiovascular care by Thomson Healthcare.

GSH was named by U.S. News & World Report as one of the top-rated hospitals in the nation for respiratory disorders care in its 20th annual Best Hospitals issue in 2009. U.S.

The hospital also was recognized for its top national rankings for clinical quality with five-star ratings in nine categories: total knee replacement surgery, carotid surgery, peripheral vascular bypass, overall pulmonary services, treatment of heart attack, treatment of heart failure, treatment of pneumonia, treatment of respiratory failure and treatment of sepsis.

== See also ==
- List of hospitals in Ohio
