= Woodward Career Technical High School =

Public, coeducational high school in the United States

Location
- 7005 Reading Road; Bond Hill, Cincinnati, Hamilton County, Ohio 45237; United States; 39°11′17″N 84°27′57″W

Information
- Type: Public, Coeducational high school
- Motto: Connecting Classrooms to Colleges & Careers
- Established: 1831; 195 years ago
- Founder: William Woodward
- School district: Cincinnati Public Schools
- Superintendent: Shauna Murphy
- Principal: Dwayne DuBois
- Teaching staff: 61.15 (on an FTE basis)
- Grades: 9–12
- Enrollment: 846 (2023–2024)
- Student to teacher ratio: 13.83
- Colors: Blue and white
- Athletics conference: Cincinnati Metro Athletic Conference
- Mascot: Bulldog
- Team name: Bulldogs
- Rival: Withrow University High School
- Website: School website

Woodward Career Technical High School is a public high school located in the Bond Hill neighborhood of Cincinnati, Ohio, United States. It is a part of the Cincinnati Public School District.

== History ==
=== Old Woodward Building ===
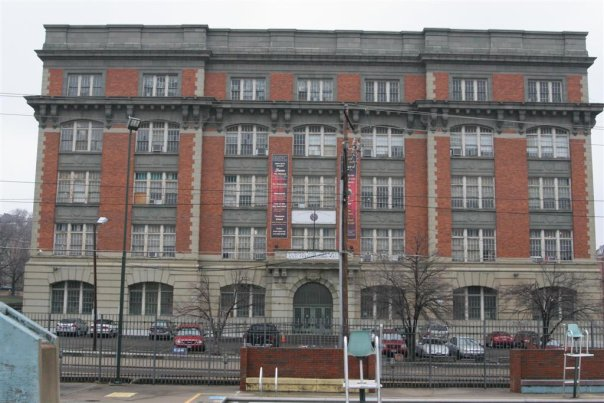
Front of the old building

Woodward was one of the first public schools in the country. The land for the original school was donated by William Woodward and his wife Abigail Cutter in 1826 to provide free education for poor children who could not afford private schooling. The Woodward Free Grammar School opened on the site in 1831 and was the first free public school in the city. The original two-story school building was replaced in 1855. On the day after his election, President Elect William Howard Taft, who graduated from Woodward High School in 1874, laid the cornerstone of a third building, which opened to students in 1910 (39°6′38″N 84°30′36″W). The third building was designed in the Renaissance Revival style by Cincinnati architect Gustave W. Drach, who was a Woodward alum.

The site is also linked to the Underground Railroad. William Woodward built a large boarding house on the site in 1832, where Levi Coffin and his wife Catharine lived from 1856 to 1863.

After Levi Coffin sold his dry goods store in 1856, he leased the boarding house on the southwest corner of Franklin Street and Broadway, near Woodward College. In his Reminiscences of Levi Coffin published in 1876, Levi described the boarding house and how he and his wife Catherine used it for abolition activities on the underground railroad:

It was in a quiet location, and detached from other buildings, having a large open lot on the south, with shade trees, and the college lot on the west. The building contained over thirty rooms, most of them large and well ventilated. Here we opened a private boarding-house, receiving only such as we thought would be agreeable company, for regular boarders, and in a short time had a large and pleasant circle around our table. The members were mostly professors of religion, of different evangelical denominations, and the majority were strongly anti-slavery in sentiment. Several of the principals and teachers of the public schools boarded with us, as well as those of the Woodward High School, and we also had ministers of different denominations in our family. In addition to all these, we had many transient boarders. Our house was a resort for Friends who came to the city on business, and other of our acquaintances from the country, so that for a number of years it was similar to Friends' Institute in London, where members of the Society from different parts of the kingdom lodge and dine together when in that city on business or other errands. The building and locality on the corner of Franklin and Broadway made a very suitable depot of the Underground Railroad, and rarely a week passed without bringing us passengers for that mysterious road. There was no pecuniary income from that class of boarders, but a constant outlay for them. I kept a horse and wagon always on hand to convey fugitives to the next depot. My wagon was made to order for this express purpose; it was a strong spring-wagon, neatly curtained so that it could be tightly closed, having a curtain in front, just behind the driver, and had seats for six passengers. On one occasion eight grown persons were crowded in, besides the driver; this was a heavy load for my horse, but when out of the city and beyond Walnut Hills, the men got out and walked, which they could safely do, as it was in the night. Some of my friends called my wagon the Underground Railroad car, and my horse the locomotive.

—

Coffin (known as "The President of the Underground Railroad") and his wife Catherine sheltered and cared for over one hundred self-emancipated freedom seekers each year on their way to Canada. The home was first occupied by Henry Rucher, an early principal and math teacher at the Woodward school, and it was commonly known as the Rucher House. It later served as the Good Samaritan Hospital (still in operation at its later Clifton Heights location). In 1865 it became St. Luke's Hospital, where disabled Civil War soldiers were treated. It was replaced by residential homes in 1874, which were demolished to clear ground for the new Woodward school building in 1907.

The current five-story building has 150 rooms and 225,000 sq ft (20,900 m^{2}) of space, a third of which is unusable (including the swimming pools on the top floor).

The building is listed in the Over-the-Rhine (South) Local Historic District and the Over-the-Rhine National Register Historic District.

=== Bond Hill ===
In 1953 Woodward High School moved to a new location in Bond Hill at the corner of Reading Road and E. Seymour Avenue, designed to serve the postwar surge in population in the suburbs of Bond Hill, Golf Manor, Roselawn, Hartwell, and Carthage. The old downtown building was designated Abigail Cutter Junior High School until the School for Creative and Performing Arts took over the entire facility in 1977.

In August 2006, the City of Cincinnati opened Woodward Career Technical High School, which features a mixture of college-preparatory and vocational education. With the new addition, the original campus was now called Woodward Traditional High School.
