= Courtland Flats =

Apartment building in Cincinnati, Ohio, US

- U.S. National Register of Historic Places
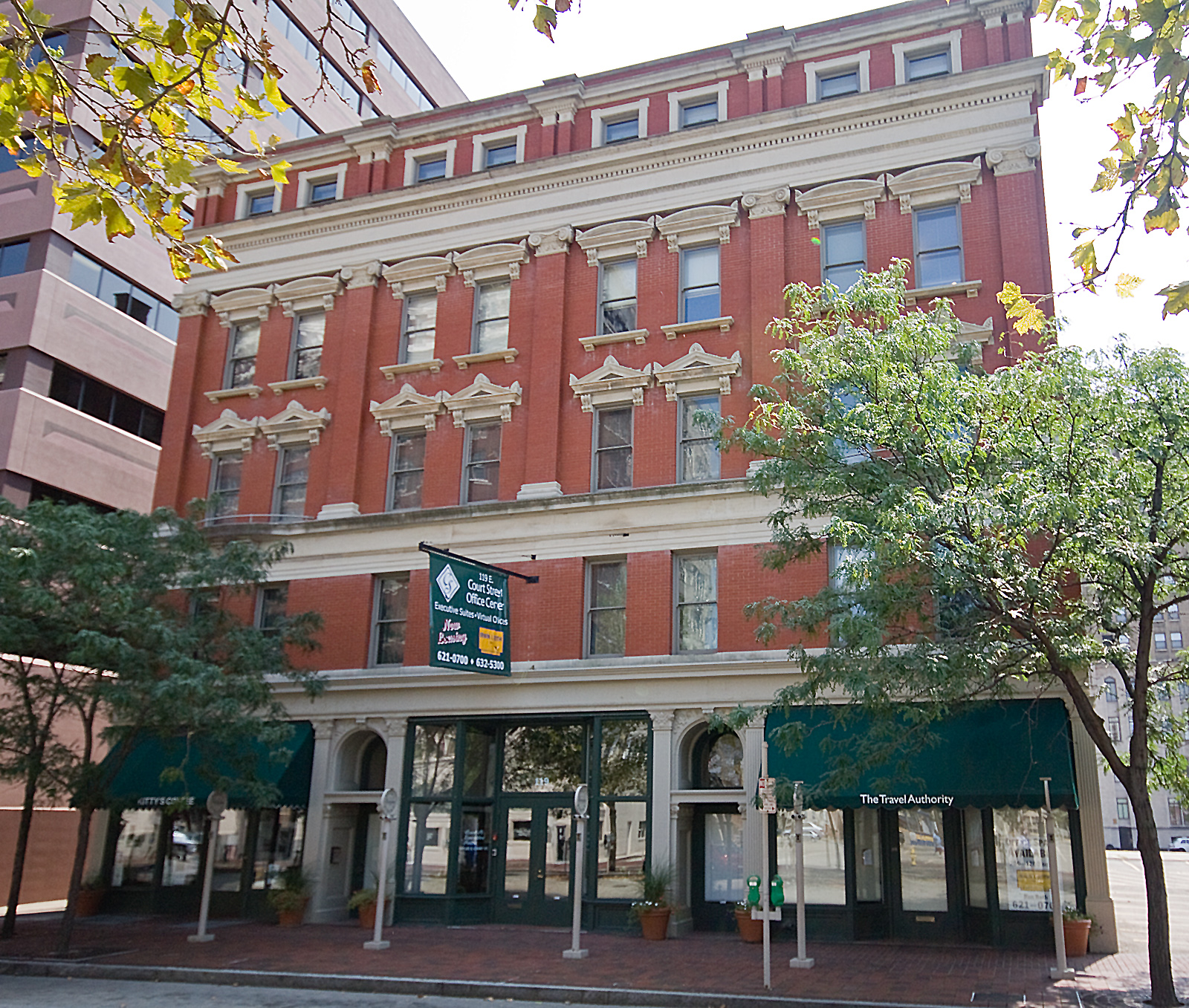
- Front of the building

- Location within Ohio Location within the United States
- Location: 117-121 E. Court St., Cincinnati, Ohio
- Coordinates: 39°6′23″N 84°30′42″W
- Area: less than one acre
- Built: 1902
- Architectural style: Late 19th and 20th Century Revivals, Second Renaissance Revival
- NRHP reference No.: 84001046
- Added to NRHP: December 20, 1984

The Courtland Flats are an apartment building on Court Street in Cincinnati, Ohio, United States. A brick building constructed in 1902, it was the first Second Renaissance Revival apartment building to be constructed in the city's downtown. Despite the presence of many Second Renaissance Revival elements, the building includes several details more typical of the First Renaissance Revival period, such as elaborate window decorations on the exterior, multi-piece pediments above the fourth-floor windows, and prominent pilasters.

The Courtland's first owner was Christopher Sandheger, one of Cincinnati's leading distillers of whiskey. During the late nineteenth and early twentieth century, Cincinnati produced more whiskey than any other city in the country, thus leading to great wealth for men such as Sandheger. In 1984, the Courtland Flats were recognized for their well-preserved historic architecture by being added to the National Register of Historic Places. Another apartment building on Court Street, known as one of the Alkemeyer Commercial Buildings, had been placed on the Register four years previously.
