= Textile Building (Cincinnati, Ohio) =

Coordinates: 39.099110°N 84.516074°W

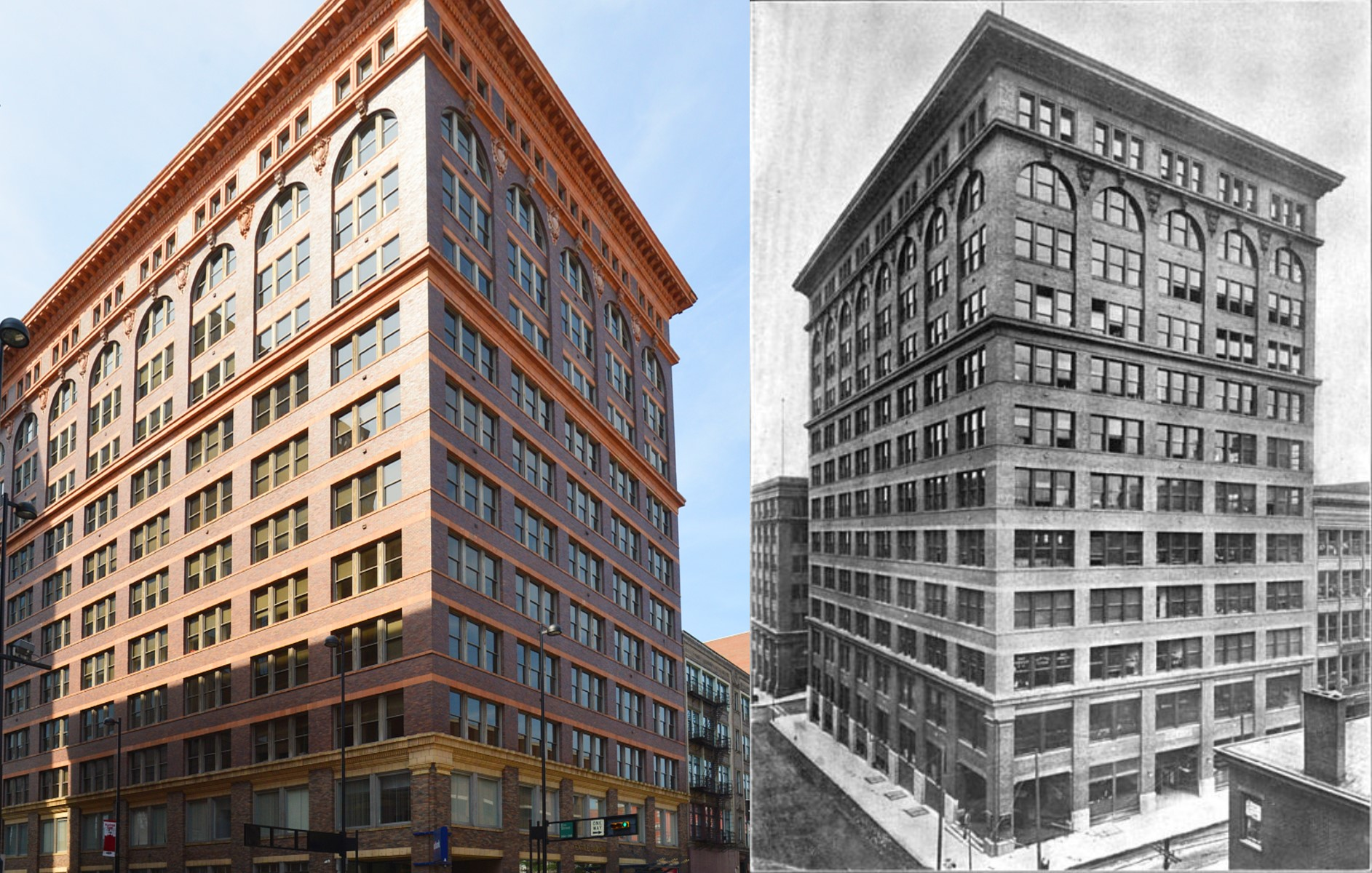
- Textile Building past and present

General information
- Type: Residential
- Location: 205 W Fourth St. Cincinnati, Ohio 45202
- Completed: 1906

Technical details
- Floor count: 12
- Floor area: 213,704 square feet

Design and construction
- Architect: Gustave W. Drach

The Textile Building is a historic building in downtown Cincinnati, Ohio. The 12-story building was constructed in 1906 in an attempt by the city to centralize its scattered garment and textile industries into a single building. Designed by Cincinnati-based architect Gustave W. Drach, the building fuses elements of the Commercial and Renaissance Revival architectural styles. Used as an office building for several decades, it was converted into an apartment building in 2023 and renamed Textile Apartments.

== History ==
=== Planning and construction ===
In the 1800s, Cincinnati's bustling textiles industry was dispersed throughout the Third Street core of the city. At the turn of the century, Cincinnati began to centralize industries into singular buildings. Under this initiative, the Textile Building was conceived as an attempt to consolidate the city's textile industry. On November 3, 1904, Charles L. Harrison announced his intention to construct a 12-story skyscraper on the southwest corner of Fourth and Elm streets. Harrison, operating on behalf of the L. B. Harrison estate, had planned the building and sought tenants for the prior six months with the help of real estate broker Jacob Schottenfels. The building was intended to appeal to "concerns in the cloak and clothing or similar lines of business". Cost estimates "considerably" exceeded $250,000. Architect Gustave W. Drach was selected to design the structure. On the day of the announcement, Harrison instructed tenants in existing properties on the site to vacate, with demolition projected to begin as soon as the final tenants left.

On April 29, 1905, four or five ironworkers began iron work for the project, which was expected to contain more structural iron than any other building in Cincinnati at the time. Cincinnati's Building Inspector issued a permit for the building on May 16. The building was originally intended to be named the "Harrison Building", but on August 15, the Harrison estate agreed to name it the "Textile Building", pleasing the clothiers that the tower was expected to serve. On August 28, The Cincinnati Enquirer learned that three major wholesale clothiers had already agreed to move to the Textile Building from the Third Street clothing district, with more in negotiations to move. With the mass migration of clothiers to Fourth Street, the number of clothing firms on Third Street was reduced from 20 to six or seven. The unfinished skyscraper was projected to be completely leased in early September, and its success "surprised even the builders". The rapid leasing of the building inspired imitators; on August 30, the Enquirer learned of plans for a similar textile-focused, 10-story tower on Fourth Street, with more buildings expected to follow. On December 18, Harrison announced that the building would be operational on January 1, 1906.

=== Commercial use ===
The Textile Building continued its success after its opening in 1906, becoming a key structure among several similar buildings in the new clothing district around Fourth Street. After a fifth clothier relocated from Third Street to the Textile Building in July, the Enquirer proclaimed that "Fourth and Elm streets has become the new center of the wholesale clothing industry".

After managing its own buildings for over 50 years, the Harrison estate gave management responsibilities for the Textile Building and all of its other properties to Robert A. Cline, Inc. on January 1, 1955. On October 1, 1959, the Harrisons sold the Textile Building to New York City real estate investor Robert A. Futterman for $500,000. The Futterman Corp., by then renamed Titan Industries, Inc., sold the tower to a group led by Cincinnati investor John L. Barth on January 30, 1967. On April 11, 1972, the Becker Clothing Co., a Cincinnati-based clothing firm, announced that it would sell its own Becker Building, purchase the Textile Building from the Barth group for $500,000, and renovate the Textile Building for $250,000. In 1976, the Textile Building was included as a part of the West Fourth Street Historic District's admission to the National Register of Historic Places (amended August 13, 1979).

On July 25, 1984, The Cincinnati Post reported that Becker and Phillip R. Duke & Associates were planning a $12 million renovation of the building. The two developers formed a joint venture, Fourth & Elm Associates. The renovation was slated to convert the first floor into retail space and the upper floors into offices while restoring the building's exterior to its original appearance. Cincinnati architectural firm Glaser & Myers and Associates was hired to design the renovation. The converted building would be renamed the "Textile/Becker Building". In October, the Post stated that the U.S. Department of Housing and Urban Development had rejected the city's request for a $750,000 grant for the renovation. On February 7, 1985, the Post still referred to Becker as "the owner of the building", but on March 22, the Enquirer stated that Duke had obtained the tower from Becker. In 1987, Duke's local managing general partner stated that his company purchased the building in "late 1984 or early 1985". By January 28, 1986, some tenants were already present in the structure, and the renovation was scheduled for full completion the following month.

In 1987, Duke sold a controlling interest in the Textile-Becker Building to McKinley Associates Inc. of Ann Arbor, Michigan. McKinley borrowed $14.7 million from Travelers Insurance Co. to complete the purchase, anticipating that rents would rise. However, extensive creation of new office space by Duke and other developers caused rents to stagnate or decline in downtown over the following years. Travelers agreed to give McKinley time to resolve its financial difficulties in April 1992, but the lender took control of the building on December 4 after McKinley failed to manage its debt. Travelers expressed its intention to initiate foreclosure against the building and sell it at a sheriff's auction, which the company did not anticipate would cover the $16.5 million it was owed. The tower was 24% vacant at the time.

An investment arm of Newport Beach, California-based Koll Co. bought the skyscraper from Travelers in July 1994 for $3.9 million. The Manhattan National Life Insurance Co., which moved from New York to Cincinnati in 1987 and hosted 200 employees in the Textile Building, proposed buying the structure in 1996. Manhattan requested an unspecified form of assistance from the city government to purchase the building, threatening to move to the suburbs if it could not obtain ownership. Instead, Manhattan's parent company announced that the insurer would close its Cincinnati office on December 5, 1997, vacating three floors and 60,000 square feet in the tower. By April 1998, many in the city's real estate industry believed that Duke was on the verge of reacquiring the building for $12 million as part of a multi-property deal. Australian company Lendlease purchased the tower for $12 million on December 22 of that year. By January 1999, Lendlease had awarded the leasing and management contract to LaSalle Partners. The building was 6% vacant at the time, with major tenants including Star Bank and Aetna.

Hertz Investment Group of Santa Monica, California purchased the Textile Building for $12 million in June 2006.

On March 1, 2016, the Textile Building was purchased for $12 million by an affiliate of the national historic property developer Hudson Holdings LLC. The firm planned a $70 million renovation that would have transformed the building into a mixed-use property. In 2017, affiliate HH Cincinnati Textile was sued by Acres Capital Servicing for defaulting on a $20.3 million debt. The lawsuit stated that the affiliate had been collecting rent payments from tenants but did not deposit them as required. In April 2018, the property was placed into receivership under Foresite Realty Advisors CEO Donald Shapiro in order to collect on the defaulted debts. In June 2018, Shapiro reported that the building was about 74% leased and was in “fair condition”. Later that year, a Hamilton County judge authorized the receiver to sell the property free and clear of liens.

=== Residential conversion ===
In early 2019, the building was purchased by an affiliate of Washington, D.C.-based developer Bernstein Cos. for $8 million. Bernstein subsequently announced that the building would be converted into a residential structure at a projected cost of $69 million. In late 2020, the developer received $5 million in tax credits from the state due to the building's historic status. HGC Construction and design firm Strada were hired to assist with the project. In addition to 282 market-rate apartment units, the redesigned building included street-level retail, recreational facilities, and storage space. The interior of the building was remodeled to resemble a warehouse, referencing the building's industrial past. The majority of the exterior facade was preserved. The building opened to residents in 2023 under the name Textile Apartments. In 2024, Bernstein purchased the adjacent Hooper Building and announced that it would also undergo residential conversion. Plans for the conversion called for Hooper Building residents to have access to common facilities in the Textile Building, while Textile Building residents would have access to the storage units in the Hooper Building.

== Architecture ==
The Textile Building incorporates aspects of both the Chicago School and the Renaissance Revival architectural styles. Construction was completed in 1906. The building's baseboard was built with green marble. The wainscoting used Tennessee marble, with gray marble in the lower portion and red in the upper. The exterior facade consists of brick and terracotta.
