= Power Building =

- U.S. National Register of Historic Places
- U.S. Historic district – Contributing property
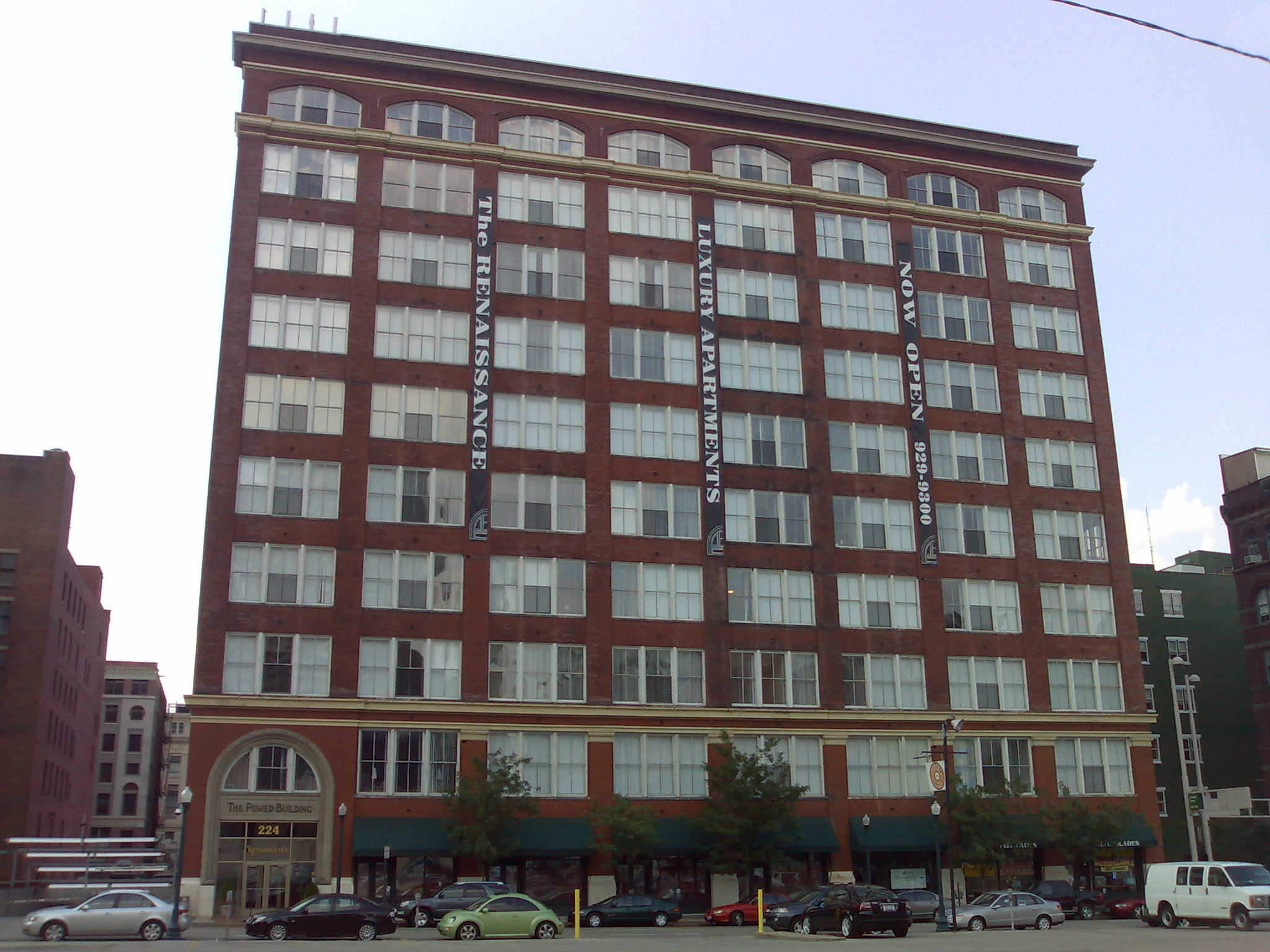
- Front of the building

- Location within Ohio Location within the United States
- Location: 224 E. 8th St., Cincinnati, Ohio
- Coordinates: 39°6′19″N 84°30′32″W
- Area: less than one acre
- Built: 1903
- Architect: Harry Hake
- Architectural style: Early Commercial
- Part of: Cincinnati East Manufacturing and Warehouse District (ID99000318)
- NRHP reference No.: 99000276
- Added to NRHP: March 5, 1999

The Power Building is a historic commercial building in the downtown of Cincinnati, Ohio, United States.

== History ==
Built in 1903, it was designed by Harry Hake. It was listed on the National Register of Historic Places on March 5, 1999. One week later, a group of buildings in the northeastern section of downtown was named a historic district, the Cincinnati East Manufacturing and Warehouse District; the Power Building is one of the district's contributing properties. In 2002 the building was renovated and made into high-rise luxury apartments now known as "The Renaissance".

In 2016, the building was sold by Capital Investment Group for $25.4 million cash to a "group of local buyers".

== Description ==
The building has 117 apartments and 100 parking spaces in the basement floors.
