= Cincinnati and Suburban Telephone Company Building =

- U.S. National Register of Historic Places
- Cincinnati Local Historic Landmark
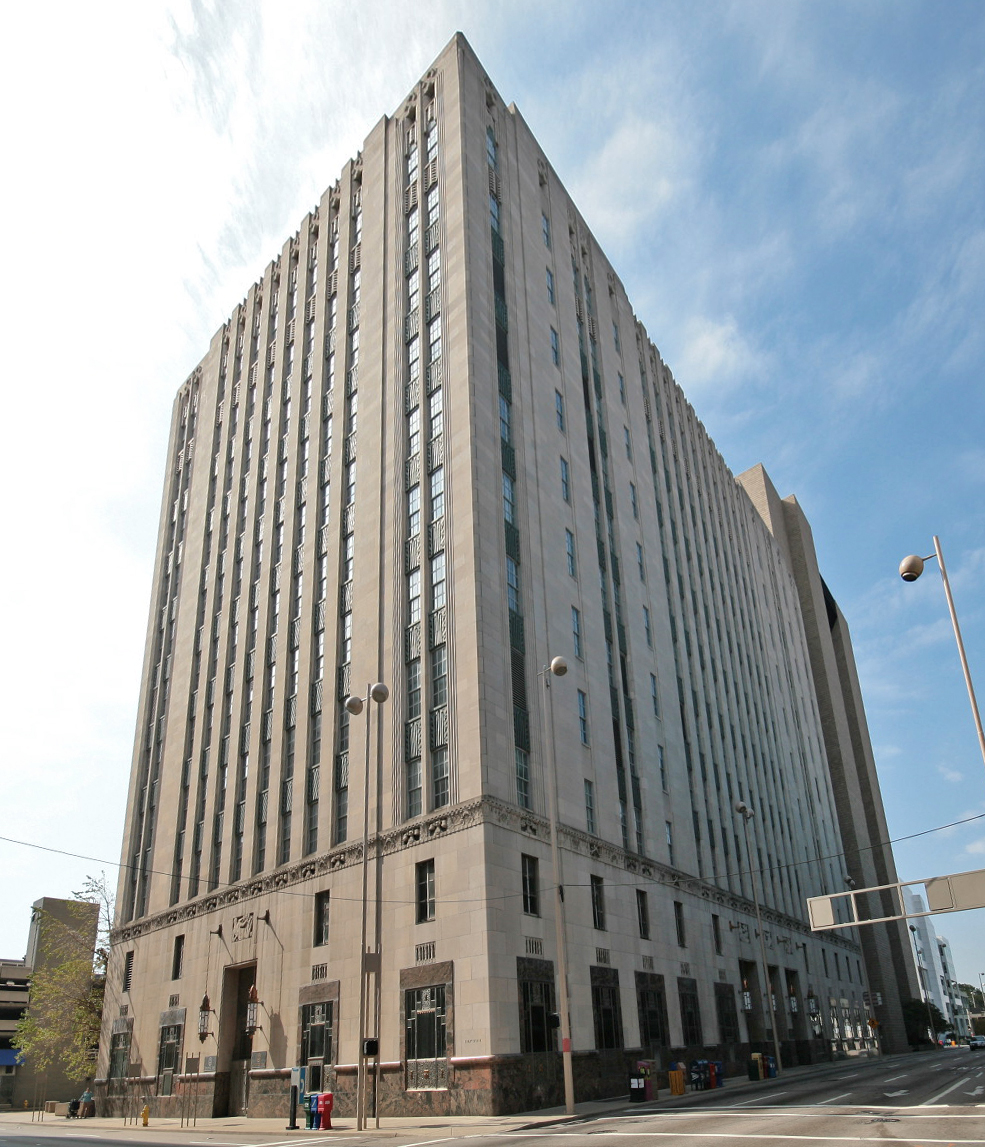
- Location: 209 West Seventh Street, Cincinnati, Ohio, Ohio
- Coordinates: 39°6′10″N 84°31′2″W
- Architect: Harry Hake
- Architectural style: Art Deco
- NRHP reference No.: 95000495
- Added to NRHP: April 20, 1995

Cincinnati and Suburban Telephone Company Building is a registered historic building in Cincinnati, Ohio. It was designed by Harry Hake, and listed in the National Register on April 20, 1995.

The Cincinnati Bell Company opened its building at Seventh and Elm streets in 1931. At that time, it housed the world's longest straight switchboard, with 88 operator positions.

The building was built in such a way as to protect the city's phone network. With a push of a button heavy steel doors will lock and metal covers will spring up over the windows on the lower floors.

Representations of rotary telephones are carved into the limestone frieze on the building's facade. Continuing the communication motif, still other reliefs depict a runner, telephone inventor Alexander Graham Bell, and nautical flag signals.

The general contractor was the J. and F. Harig Co., Cincinnati, Ohio.
