= Cincinnati East Manufacturing and Warehouse District =

Historic district in Ohio, United States

Coordinates: 39.106°N 84.509°W

- U.S. National Register of Historic Places
- U.S. Historic district
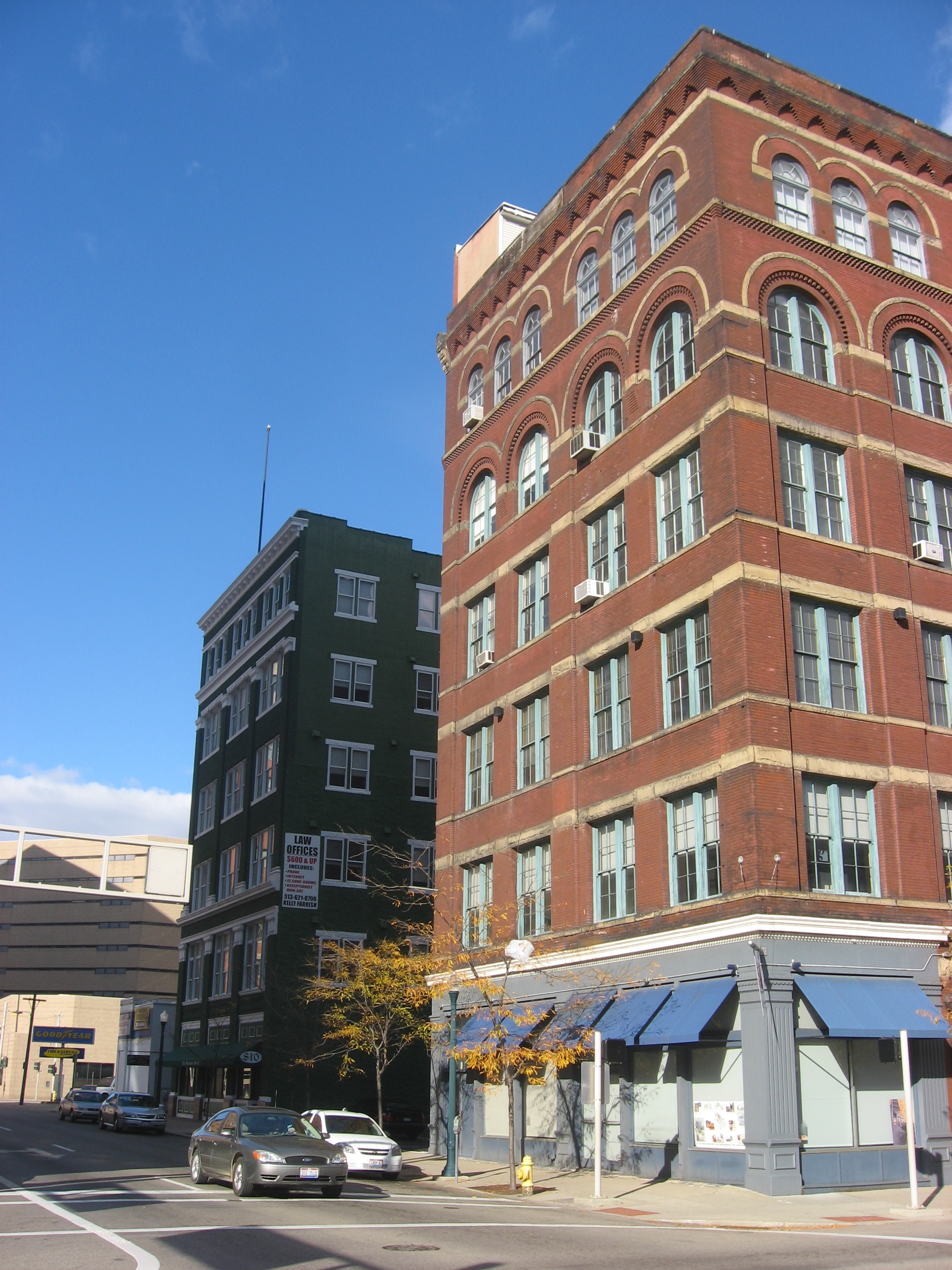
- Sycamore Street in the district

- Location within Ohio Location within the United States
- Location: Cincinnati, Ohio
- Area: 150 acres (0.61 km^{2})
- Architect: Alfred Oscar. Elzner and Harry Hake
- Architectural style: Italianate and Chicago
- NRHP reference No.: 99000318
- Added to NRHP: March 12, 1999

Cincinnati East Manufacturing and Warehouse District is a registered historic district in Cincinnati, Ohio, listed in the National Register on March 12, 1999. It contains 23 contributing buildings. It is roughly bounded E. Court Street, E. 8th Street, Broadway, and Main Street in the central business district.

The late 19th and early 20th century, buildings in the historic district are mostly five to seven stories tall and originally housed of industry and manufacturing operations.

In the late 20th century, several contributing buildings to this historic district were converted from industrial space into luxury apartments and condominiums. The Power Building (1903) at 224 E. 8th Street was transformed into the Renaissance at the Power Building.
