= Saxony Apartment Building =

- U.S. National Register of Historic Places
- U.S. Historic district – Contributing property
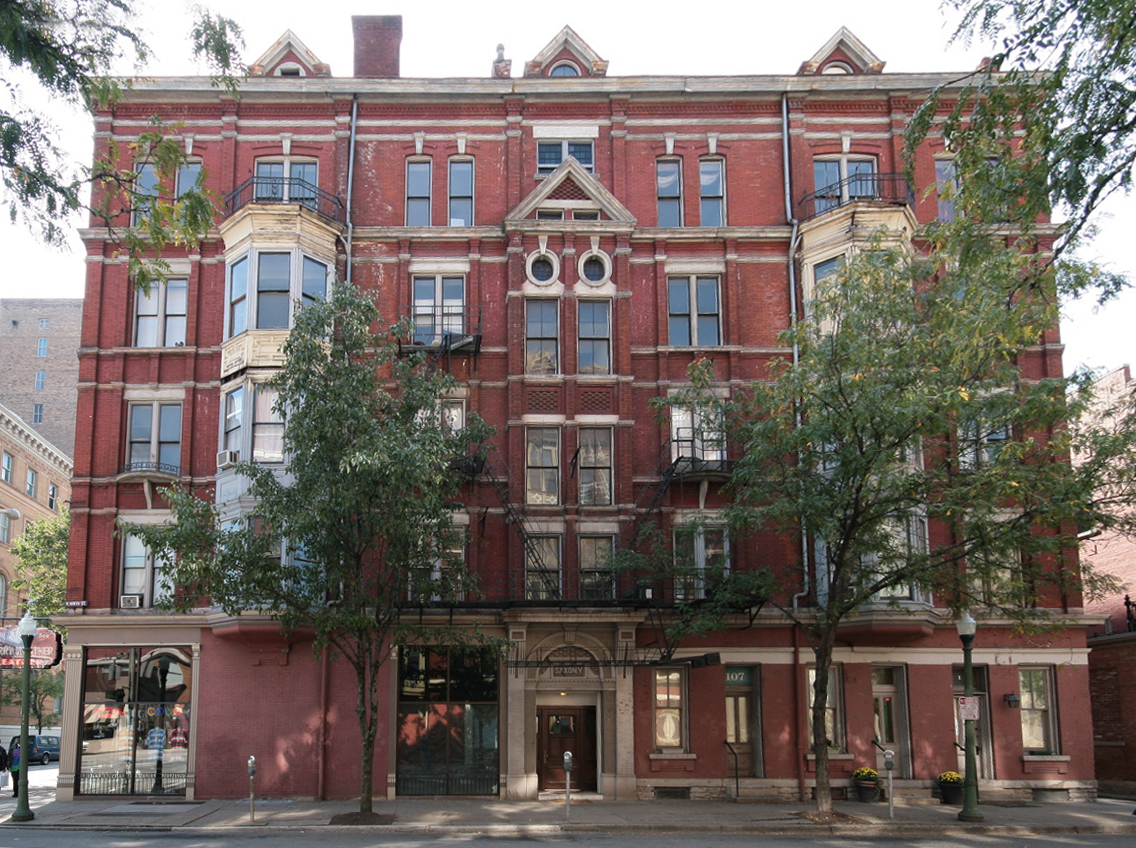
- Front of the Saxony Apartments

- Location within Ohio Location within the United States
- Location: 105-111 W. 9th St., Cincinnati, Ohio
- Coordinates: 39°6′18.23″N 84°30′57.85″W
- Area: less than one acre
- Built: 1891
- Architect: Samuel Hannaford and Sons
- Part of: Ninth Street Historic District (ID80003067)
- MPS: Samuel Hannaford and Sons TR in Hamilton County
- NRHP reference No.: 80003083
- Added to NRHP: March 3, 1980

The Saxony Apartment Building is a historic apartment building in Cincinnati, Ohio, United States. Located along Ninth Street in the city's downtown, this five-story brick building includes a distinctive range of architectural details. Among these elements are brick pilasters and projections, a three-story bay window on each side of the symmetrical main facade, semicircular balconies, and many stone pieces, such as pediments, keystones, and stringcourses. Due to its location at the intersection of Ninth and Race Streets, the Saxony appears to have two fronts: one onto each street. Although the Ninth Street facade is larger and more complex, the Race Street facade is nevertheless ornate as well: it features small yet elaborate semicircular balconies with wrought iron railings similar to those of the Ninth Street facade.

Constructed in 1891 according to a design by leading Cincinnati architect Samuel Hannaford, the Saxony Apartment Building was constructed during the last years of Hannaford's practice. By this time, he had established himself as one of the city's premier architects, due in large part to his responsibility for the grand Cincinnati Music Hall in the 1870s. Among the distinctive elements of his buildings as a group is the wide range of architectural styles that he employed: his surviving buildings demonstrate at least five different styles, and although the Saxony Apartments include some obvious Queen Anne elements, the building's overall style cannot easily be classified.

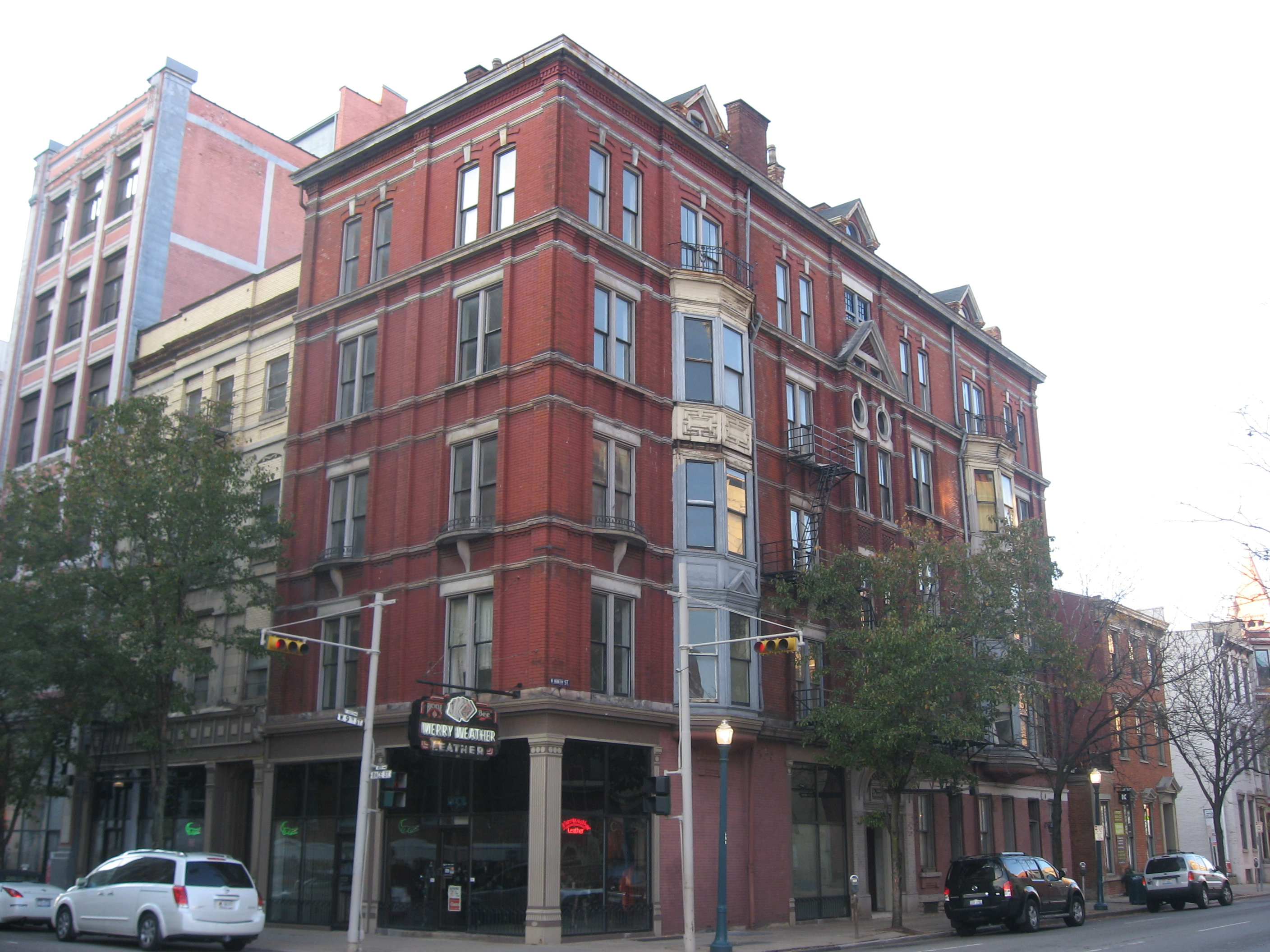
Front and side facades of the Saxony

On March 3, 1980, the Saxony Apartment Building was listed on the National Register of Historic Places, due to its well-preserved historic architecture. Three other apartment buildings, along with more than thirty other buildings in the cities of Cincinnati and Wyoming, were listed on the National Register at the same time as part of a multiple property submission of buildings designed by Hannaford in Hamilton County. Eight months later, the portion of Ninth Street between Vine and Race Streets was added to the Register as the Ninth Street Historic District, and the Saxony Apartments were named one of the district's dozens of contributing properties.
