= Ninth Street Historic District =

Historic district in Ohio, United States

- U.S. National Register of Historic Places
- U.S. Historic district
- Cincinnati Local Historic Landmark
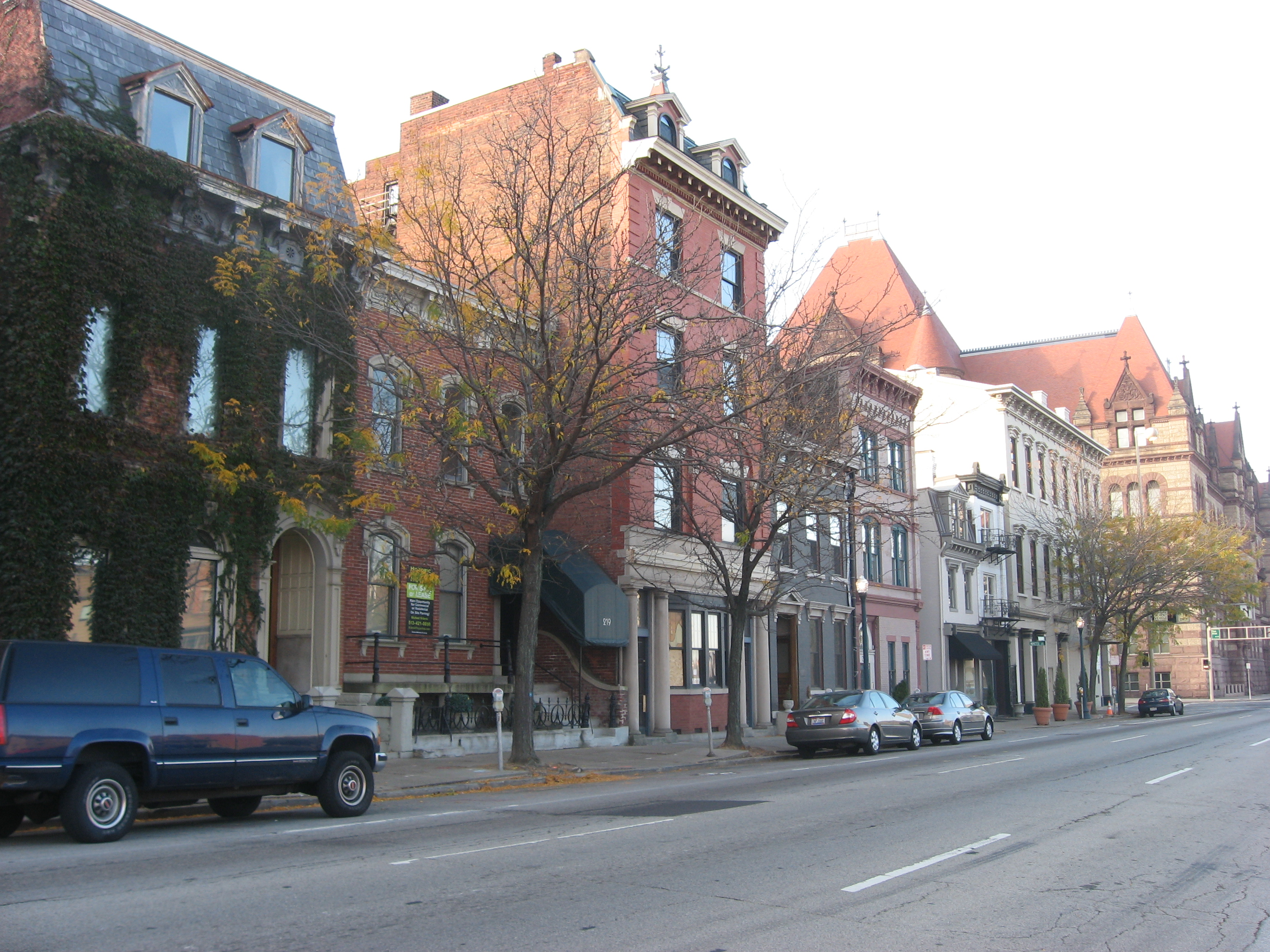
- Houses in the district

- Location within Ohio Location within the United States
- Location: 9th St. between Vine and Plum Sts., Cincinnati, Ohio
- Coordinates: 39°6′17″N 84°30′59″W
- Area: 9 acres (3.6 ha)
- Architect: Walter & Wilson; Et al.
- Architectural style: Greek Revival, Italianate, Queen Anne
- NRHP reference No.: 80003067
- Added to NRHP: November 25, 1980

The Ninth Street Historic District is a group of historic buildings located along Ninth Street on the northern side of Downtown Cincinnati, Ohio, United States. Composed of buildings constructed between the second quarter of the nineteenth century and the second quarter of the twentieth, it was primarily built between 1840 and 1890, when Cincinnati was experiencing its greatest period of growth. The district embraces the blocks of Ninth Street between Plum and Vine Streets, which includes forty-four buildings that contribute to the district's historic nature.

Few Cincinnati streets retain such a cohesive collection of nineteenth-century architecture as do these three blocks of Ninth Street. Although the buildings were erected over a span of more than a century, they are remarkably similar in their construction: examples of the Queen Anne, Italianate, and Greek Revival styles of architecture are found in the district. Throughout the years that the district was constructed, Cincinnati was a city of pedestrians, and the diversity of the district's buildings highlight this status: within the district's boundaries can be found shops, houses, apartment buildings, and other commercial structures. Among the most important buildings in the district are the Abraham J. Friedlander House, the Brittany and Saxony Apartment Buildings, and the Phoenix Club, all of which were listed on the National Register of Historic Places between May 1979 and March 1980. Eighth months after the last of these four buildings was added to the National Register, the district itself was accorded a similar distinction.
