= West Fourth Street Historic District (Cincinnati, Ohio) =

Historic district in Ohio, United States

- U.S. National Register of Historic Places
- U.S. Historic district
- Cincinnati Local Historic Landmark
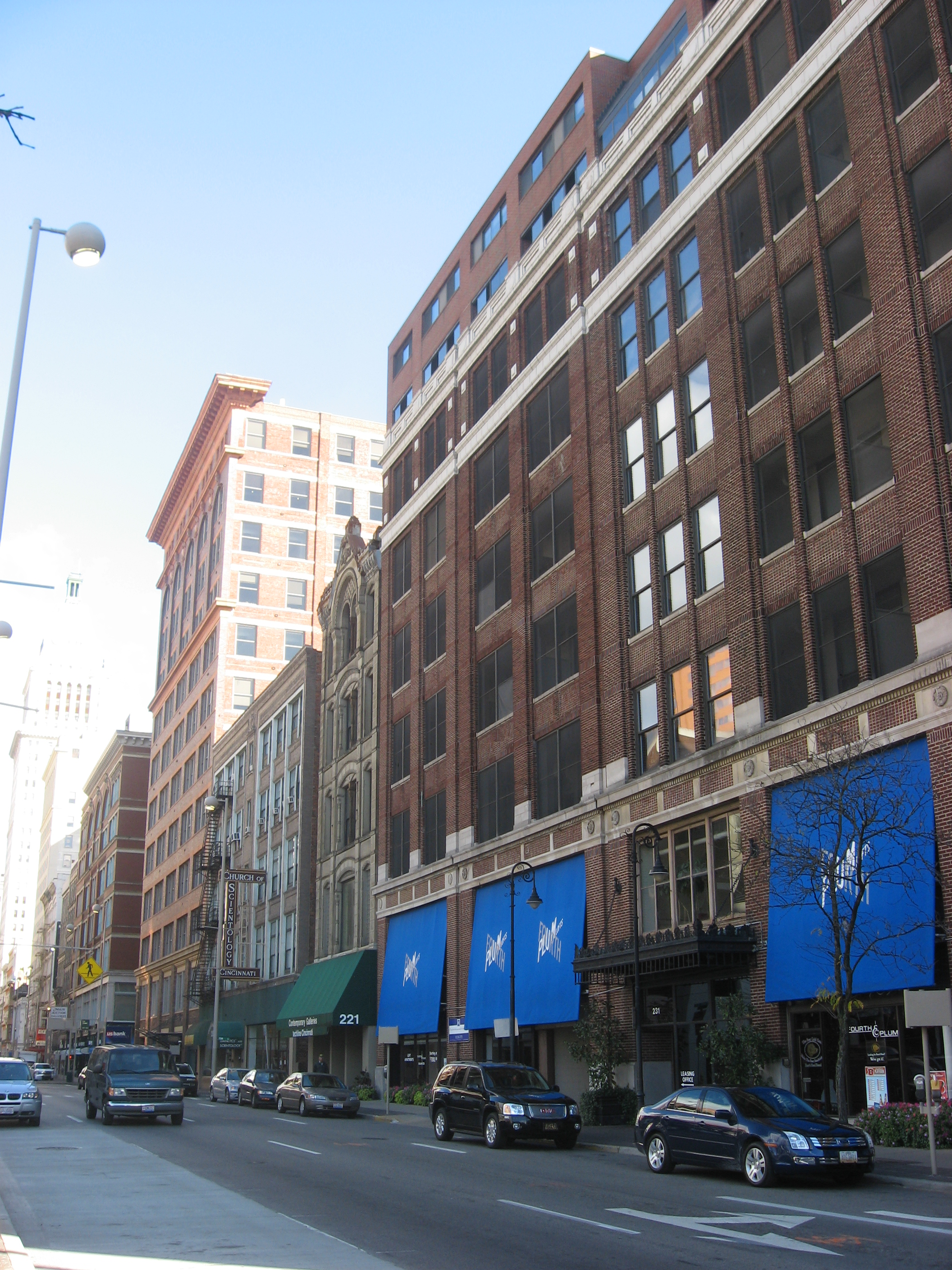
- Along Fourth Street in the district

- Location within Ohio Location within the United States
- Location: Cincinnati, Ohio
- Area: 60 acres (240,000 m^{2})
- Architect: Samuel Hannaford
- Architectural style: Italianate and Renaissance
- NRHP reference No.: 76001443, 79001861 (amendment)
- Added to NRHP: August 13, 1976 August 13, 1979 (amendment)

West Fourth Street Historic District is a registered historic district in downtown Cincinnati, Ohio, listed in the National Register of Historic Places on August 13, 1976. It contained 32 contributing buildings when it was listed, but an additional building, 309 Vine Street, was added in a 2015 boundary increase.

A smaller, albeit older historic district, the East Fourth Street Historic District, lies several blocks to the east.

In the early part of the nineteenth century, Fourth Street was lined with exclusive mansions and an opera house. Fourth Street has been an important financial center of the city since the late nineteenth century. Today, the historic district of the West section of Fourth Street is an increasingly residential area with luxury condos replacing commercial space.

The Lombardy Apartment Building, the Hooper Building, and the Fourth and Vine Tower and its annex are contributing properties to the historic district.
