= Alkemeyer Commercial Buildings =

- U.S. National Register of Historic Places
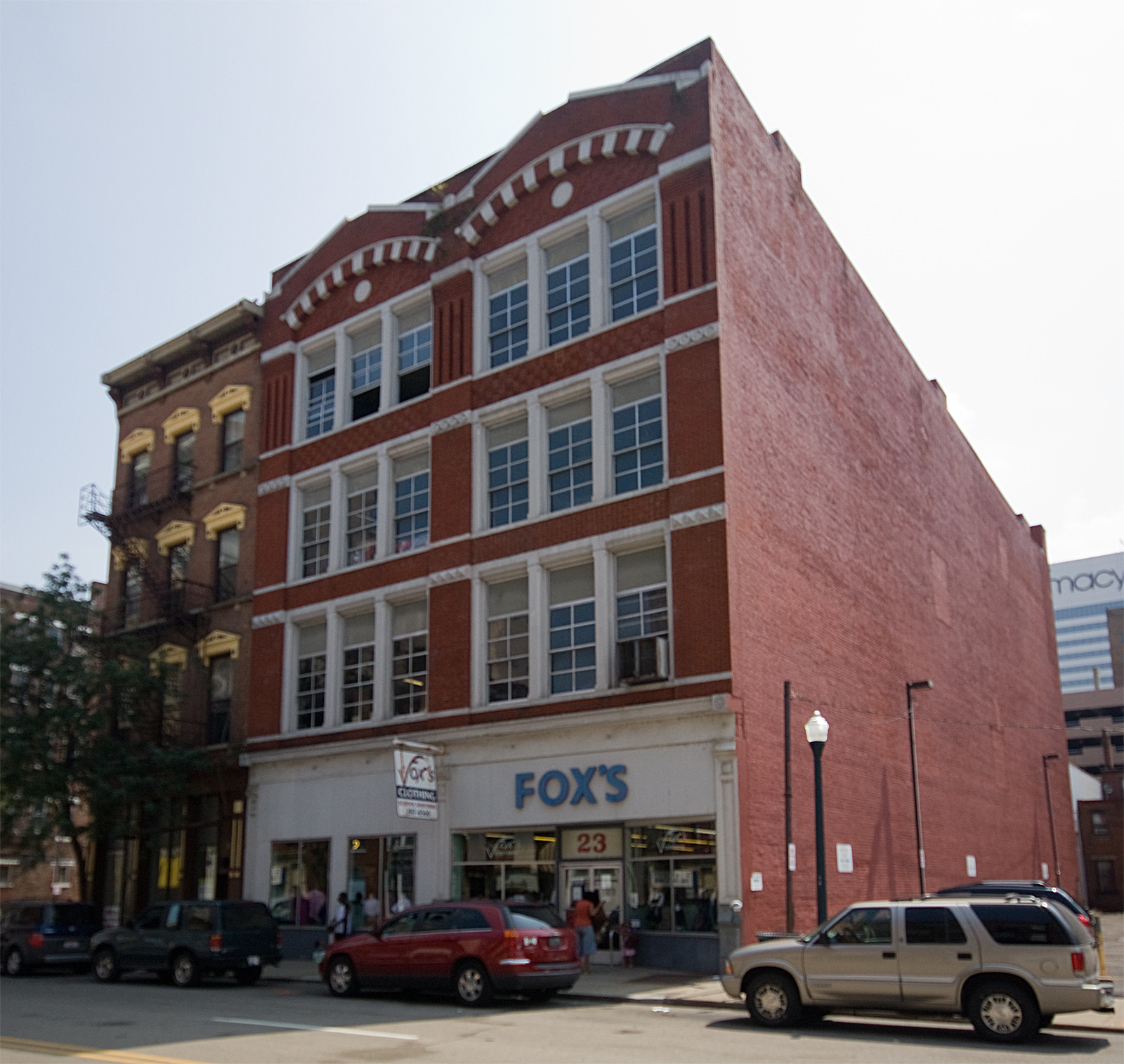
- Front and western side of the buildings

- Location within Ohio Location within the United States
- Location: 19-23 W. Court St., Cincinnati, Ohio
- Coordinates: 39°6′21″N 84°30′52″W
- Area: 0.2 acres (0.081 ha)
- Built: 1879
- Architect: William Walter
- Architectural style: Italianate, Queen Anne
- NRHP reference No.: 80003034
- Added to NRHP: December 9, 1980

The Alkemeyer Commercial Buildings are a pair of business buildings located at 19 and 23 Court Street in downtown Cincinnati, Ohio, United States.

== Description and history ==
Built in 1879, these two four-story brick buildings are the most prominent structures along Court Street near its intersection with Vine Street. The buildings have been employed for a range of purposes throughout their history, including millinery, shops selling clothing and dry goods, and apartments.

The Lotze Building, located at 19 Court, was designed by William Walter, a leading Cincinnati architect, for their heirs of inventor Adolphus Lotze. An Italianate structure built from 1879 to 1880, this building is today used for residential purposes. The adjacent building at 23 Court is a larger Queen Anne structure.

In 1980, the Alkemeyer Buildings were listed together on the National Register of Historic Places. Because of their importance in local history and because of their historically significant architecture, the buildings were listed together on the National Register of Historic Places on December 9, 1980.
