= Abraham J. Friedlander House =

Historic house in Ohio, United States

- U.S. National Register of Historic Places
- U.S. Historic district – Contributing property
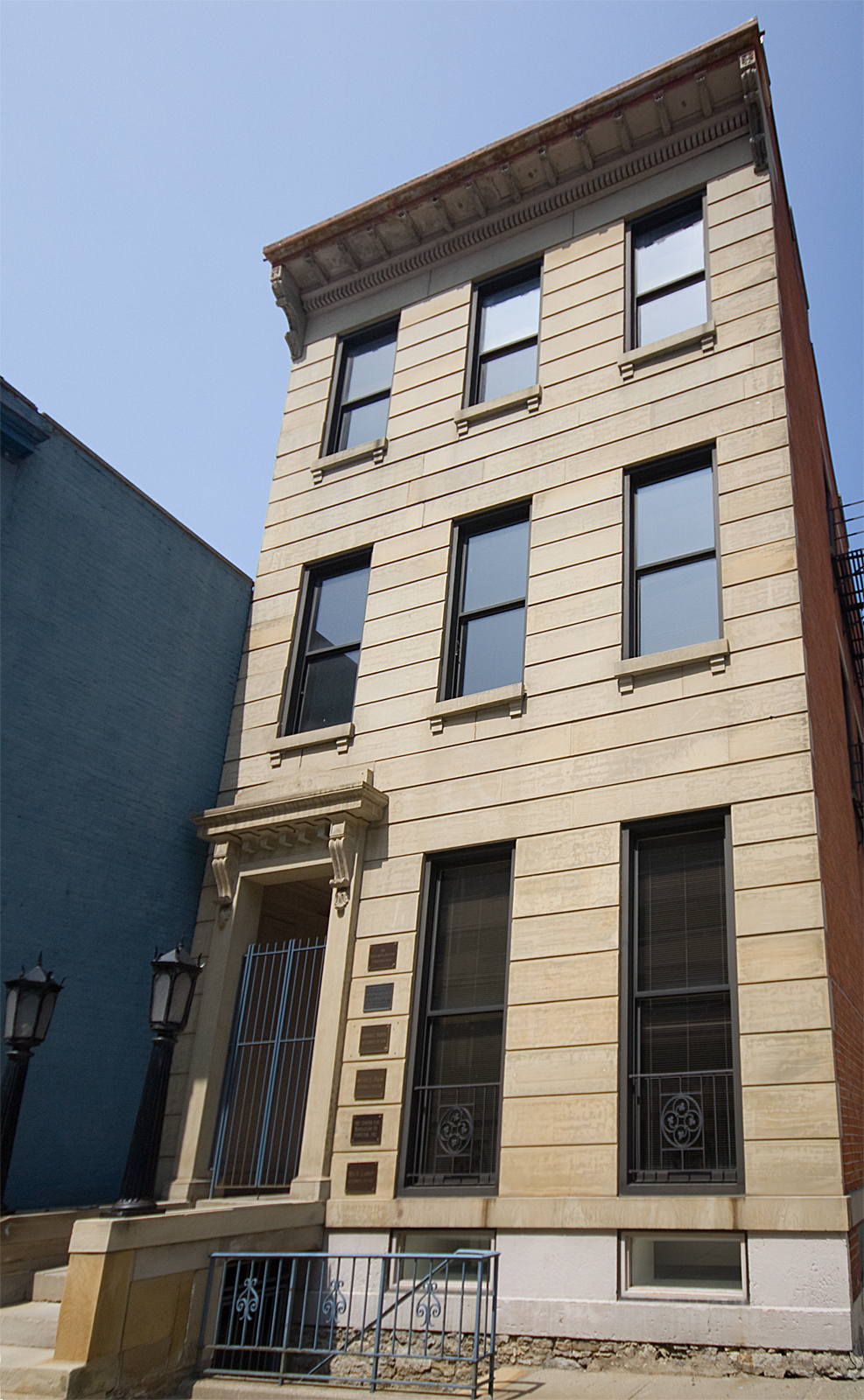
- Front of the house

- Location within Ohio Location within the United States
- Location: 8 W. 9th St., Cincinnati, Ohio
- Coordinates: 39°6′19″N 84°30′51″W
- Area: 0.1 acres (0.040 ha)
- Built: 1830
- Architectural style: Greek Revival
- Part of: Ninth Street Historic District (ID80003067)
- NRHP reference No.: 79001855
- Added to NRHP: May 7, 1979

The Abraham J. Friedlander House is a historic residence in downtown Cincinnati, Ohio, United States. Erected in 1830, it features a facade three stories tall and three bays wide; although brick is employed in some of the walls, both the foundation and the walls are predominantly sandstone. At the time of its construction, the house was used as a multi-person home; its residents were multiple tradesmen in the house's early years. Among its uses since that time has been that of a law office.

Many elements of the house demonstrate a heavy Greek Revival influence; notable among them are the front entrance, which features a transom above the door and sidelights on either side. The overall theme of the house demonstrates that the architect, whose name is unknown, was influenced by leading period architect Minard Lafever, who wrote extensively on the various forms of Classical Revival architecture.

In 1979, the Friedlander House was listed on the National Register of Historic Places, due both to its well-preserved historic architecture and to its connection with Friedlander himself. One year later, a short segment of Ninth Street was designated the Ninth Street Historic District and added to the National Register; the Friedlander House was named one of the district's contributing properties.
