= Lombardy Apartment Building =

Historic apartment building in downtown Cincinnati, Ohio, United States

- U.S. National Register of Historic Places
- U.S. Historic district – Contributing property
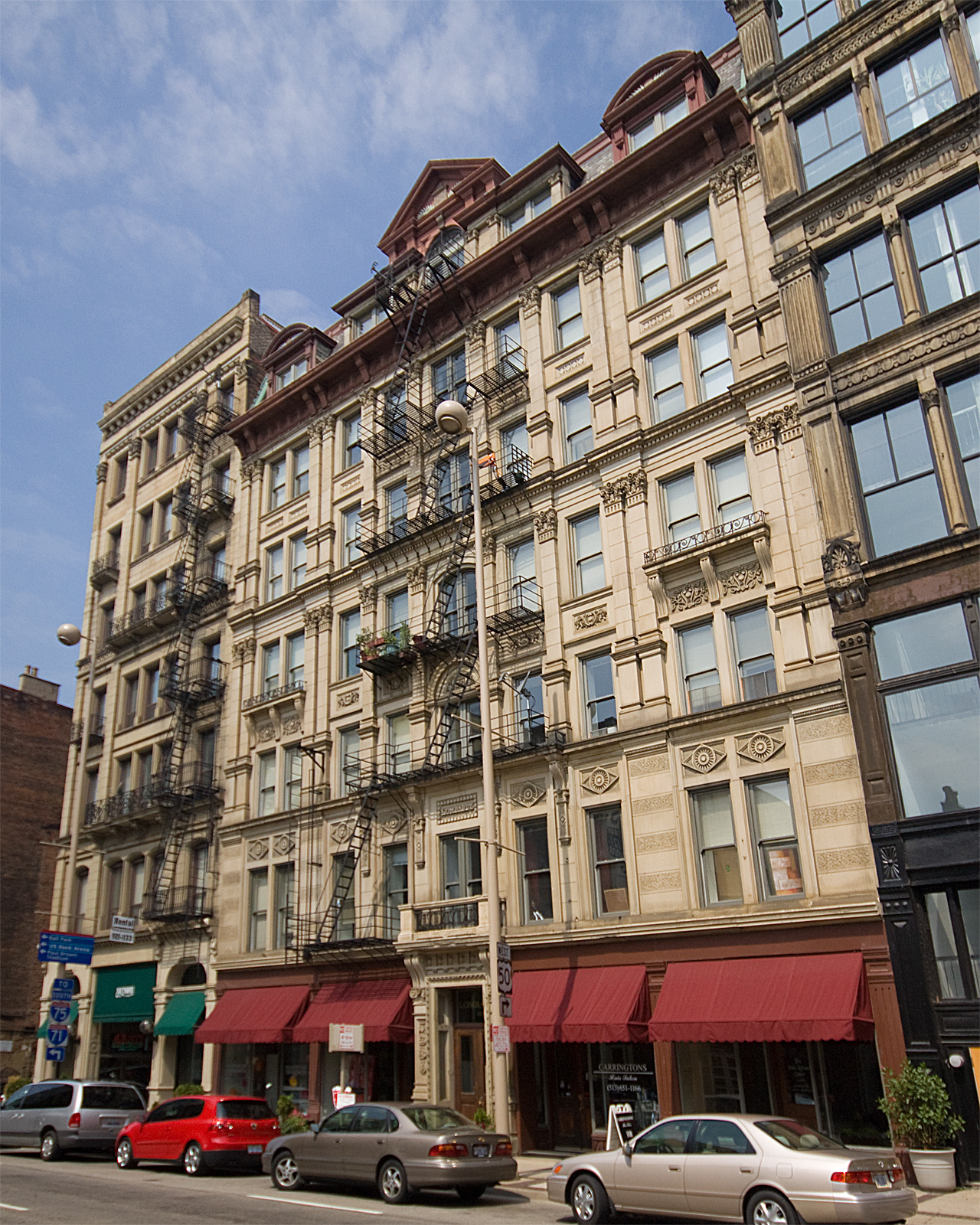
- Front of the apartment building

- Location within Ohio Location within the United States
- Location: 318-326 W. 4th St., Cincinnati, Ohio
- Coordinates: 39°5′57″N 84°31′5″W
- Area: 0 acres (0 ha)
- Built: 1880
- Architect: Samuel Hannaford; Thomas Emery & Sons
- Architectural style: Late Victorian
- Part of: West Fourth Street Historic District (ID76001443)
- MPS: Samuel Hannaford and Sons TR in Hamilton County
- NRHP reference No.: 80003062
- Added to NRHP: March 3, 1980

The Lombardy Apartment Building is a historic apartment building in downtown Cincinnati, Ohio, United States. A Victorian structure erected in 1880, it is a seven-story building with a metal-covered Mansard roof, built with brick walls and a stone foundation. Constructed by the firm of Thomas Emery's Sons, Cincinnati's leading real estate developers during the 1880s, it was one of the earliest large apartment buildings erected in the city. It is one of four large apartment complexes erected by the Emerys during the 1880s; only the Brittany and the Lombardy Apartment Buildings have endured to the present day. Both the Lombardy and the Brittany were built according to designs by Samuel Hannaford; at that time, his independent architectural practice was gaining great prominence in the Cincinnati metropolitan area.

William Howard Taft, 27th President of the United States resided in flat number 25 during his bachelor years of 1883-1885. He is listed here in the 1884 Cincinnati directory.

Among the distinctive elements of the Lombardy's architecture are plentiful pilasters with Corinthian-style capitals, an elaborate cornice and brackets, and multiple balconies of wrought iron. Although the walls are primarily brick, they are decorated with elements of sandstone, along with limestone details and projections.

In 1976, the Lombardy Apartment Building and many surrounding buildings were designated a historic district, the West Fourth Street Historic District, and added to the National Register of Historic Places. Four years later, the Lombardy was individually listed on the Register, due to its well-preserved historic architecture; it was seen as one of the region's finest examples of late 19th century urban Victorian architecture. Dozens of other properties in Cincinnati, including the Brittany Apartment Building, were added to the Register at the same time as part of a multiple property submission of buildings designed by Samuel Hannaford.
