= Brittany Apartment Building =

- U.S. National Register of Historic Places
- U.S. Historic district – Contributing property
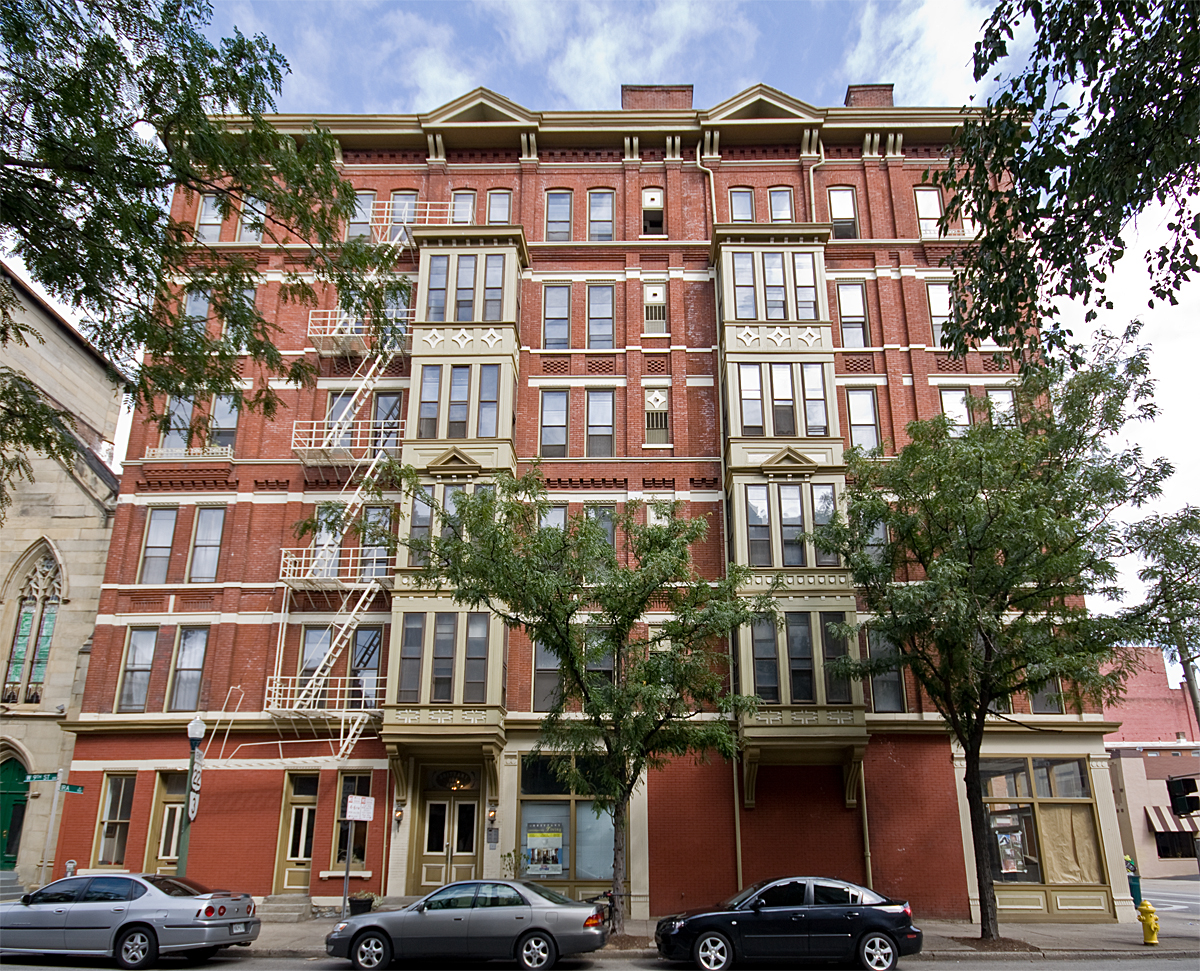
- Front of the apartment building

- Location within Ohio Location within the United States
- Location: 100-104 W. 9th St., Cincinnati, Ohio
- Coordinates: 39°6′19″N 84°30′57″W
- Area: less than one acre
- Built: 1885
- Architect: Samuel Hannaford; Thomas J. & Joseph T. Emery
- Architectural style: Queen Anne
- Part of: Ninth Street Historic District (ID80003067)
- MPS: Samuel Hannaford and Sons TR in Hamilton County
- NRHP reference No.: 80003037
- Added to NRHP: March 3, 1980

The Brittany Apartment Building is a historic apartment building in downtown Cincinnati, Ohio, United States. A Queen Anne structure constructed in 1885, it is a six-story rectangular structure with a flat roof, built with brick walls and elements of wood and sandstone. It was built by the firm of Thomas Emery's Sons, Cincinnati's leading real estate developers during the 1880s. It is one of four large apartment complexes erected by the Emerys during the 1880s; only the Brittany and the Lombardy Apartment Buildings have endured to the present day. Both the Lombardy and the Brittany were built in 1885 according to designs by Samuel Hannaford; at that time, his independent architectural practice was gaining great prominence in the Cincinnati metropolitan area.

Among the distinctive elements of the Brittany's architecture are the massive chimneys on each end of the building. The exterior of the building is covered with decorative pieces, such as a comprehensive cornice with boxed pediments, plentiful brick pilasters and corbelling, and prominent bay windows.

In 1980, the Brittany Apartment Building was listed on the National Register of Historic Places, due to its well-preserved historic architecture. Dozens of other properties in Cincinnati, including the Lombardy Apartment Building, were added to the Register at the same time as part of a multiple property submission of buildings designed by Samuel Hannaford. Eight months later, the portion of Ninth Street between Vine and Race Streets was added to the Register as the Ninth Street Historic District, and the Brittany Apartments were named one of the district's dozens of contributing properties.

The building has been redone as LeBrittany, housing 15 units of luxury condominiums.
