= H. W. Derby Building =

- U.S. National Register of Historic Places
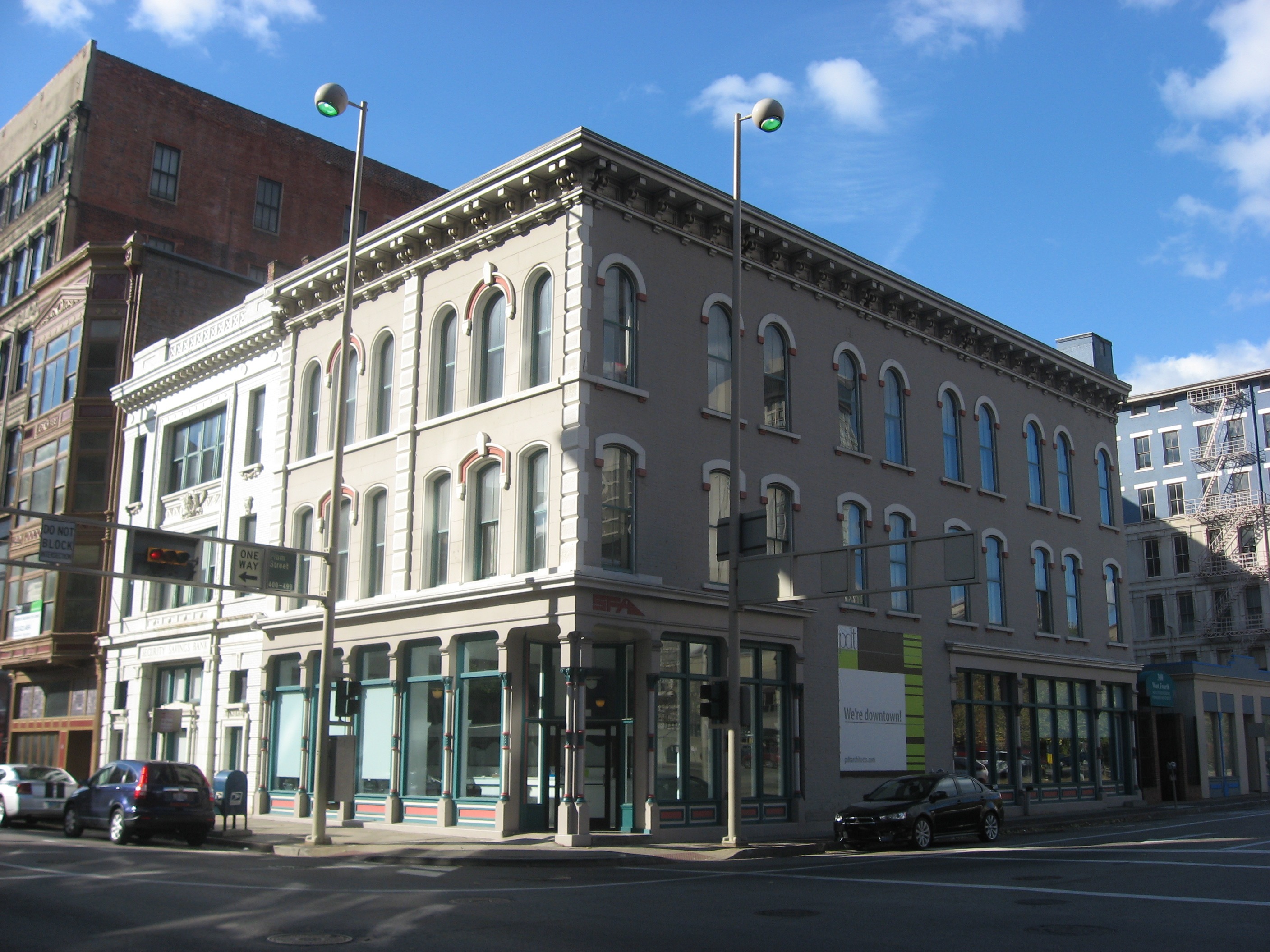
- Front and side of the building
- Location: 300 W. Fourth Street; Cincinnati, Ohio
- Coordinates: 39°05′58″N 84°31′04″W
- Architect: Samuel Hannaford
- Architectural style: Italianate
- NRHP reference No.: 80003045
- Added to NRHP: March 3, 1980

H. W. Derby Building is a registered historic building in Cincinnati, Ohio. The building was designed by architect Samuel Hannaford. It listed in the National Register on March 3, 1980.

The firm of H. W. Derby & Co. acted as a jobbing outlet "for such large eastern houses as Harpers and Appleton", operated the largest and most elaborate bookstore in the West, and was well known in the Ohio Valley. H. W. Derby had an extensive publishing business of law books, medical books, and "miscellaneous" publications, "his law book line being unrivaled in the West" and his works of history, biography, and travels, "received a new impetus with the passage of the act establishing the Ohio School Library in 1853." This law, "which Derby had zealously promoted, provided a tax for the support of libraries in school districts throughout the state, and the books for these collections were largely supplied by Derby from the publications of Harpers (who in 1839 had secured a monopoly to supply the New York School District libraries), Appleton, Derby & Jackson, and his own house."

Architect John R. Hamilton's firm Hamilton & Rankin had designed the previous H. W. Derby Building, "Derby's Building" at the southwest corner of Third and Walnut (razed).

H. W. Derby opened a New York gallery, the Institute of Fine Arts, at 625 Broadway, but "it is likely that this enterprise was a casualty of war" because a few years later he was exhibiting foreign paintings around the country "one of which, Dubufe's "Prodigal Son," burned in Smith & Nixon's hall in Cincinnati. In the late 1870s, he returned to Columbus, Ohio and then, after a few years, moved on to Cincinnati, where he erected an impressive business block, the Derby Building, which later burned down."
