= East Fourth Street Historic District (Cincinnati, Ohio) =

Historic district in Ohio, United States

- U.S. National Register of Historic Places
- U.S. Historic district
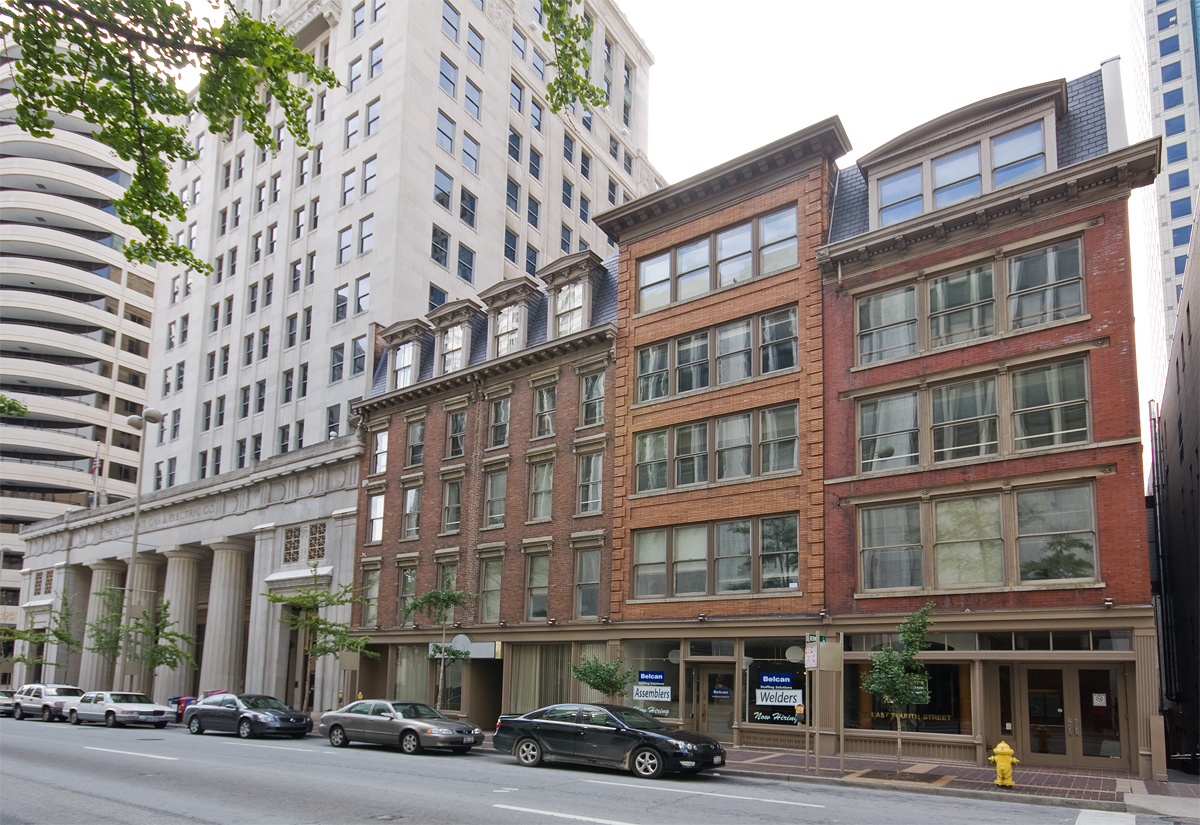

- Location within Ohio Location within the United States
- Location: 123, 127, and 135–137 E. Fourth St., Cincinnati, Ohio
- Coordinates: 39°6′7″N 84°30′37″W
- Area: 9 acres (36,000 m^{2})
- Built: 1860
- Architectural style: Second Empire, Italianate
- NRHP reference No.: 88000078
- Added to NRHP: February 22, 1988

East Fourth Street Historic District is a registered historic district in Cincinnati, Ohio, United States, listed in the National Register of Historic Places on February 22, 1988. It contains a row of 3 side-by-side contributing buildings dating circa 1860.

The former headquarters Cincinnati Gas & Electric Company, completed in 1929, although not a contributing property, stands next door to the cluster of buildings at the southwest corner of Fourth and Main streets. Its tower can be seen in the left side of the image.
