= Graeter's =

American regional ice cream chain

Coordinates: 39°11′19″N 84°28′45″W

Graeter's Ice Cream and Manufacturing Co.
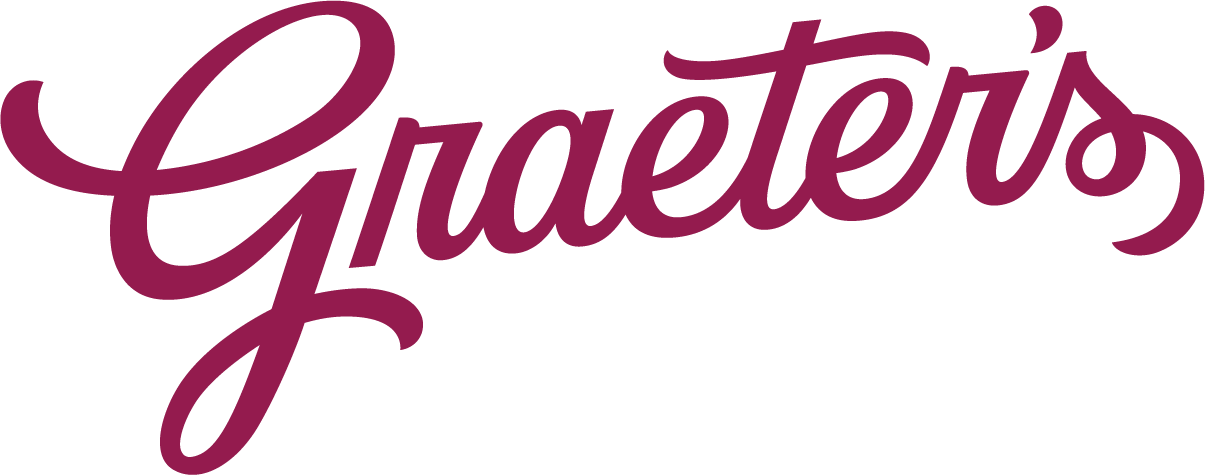
- Trade name: Graeter's
- Type: Private
- Industry: Retail; restaurants
- Founded: 1870; 156 years ago in Cincinnati, Ohio, U.S.
- Founders: Louis and Regina Graeter
- Headquarters: Cincinnati, Ohio, U.S.
- Number of locations: 59 stores (2024)
- Area served: Midwestern United States
- Key people: Richard Graeter (president and CEO); Chip Graeter (chief of retail operations); Bob Graeter (vice president)
- Products: Ice cream; pastries; candy
- Owner: Graeter family
- Website: www.graeters.com

Graeter's is a regional ice cream chain based in Cincinnati, Ohio. Founded in 1870 by Louis C. Graeter, the company has since expanded to 56 retail locations selling ice cream, candy and baked goods in the midwestern United States. It distributes its ice cream to 6,000 stores throughout the country. As of 2017, the company had 1,050 employees and $60 million in revenue.

Founder Louis Charles Graeter, the son of German immigrants, opened the first ice cream shop for the business in 1870 in Cincinnati's Pendleton neighborhood which quickly gained a following. Growing with the advent of the premium ice cream market in the decades after, the company has been managed by four successive generations of the Graeter family, expanding its retail shops to Columbus, Louisville, Indianapolis, Pittsburgh, Chicago, and other cities. Deals with major supermarket chains including Kroger have brought Graeter's Ice Cream to more than 6,200 grocery stores nationwide.

The ice cream maker is known for its "French pot" process which produces denser than average ice cream. Its national recognition for this ice cream grew over time, in particular after Oprah Winfrey declared it the best ice cream she had ever tasted in 2002. Since then, a number of celebrities and media publications have commented on the ice cream brand's quality.

== History ==
=== First generation ===
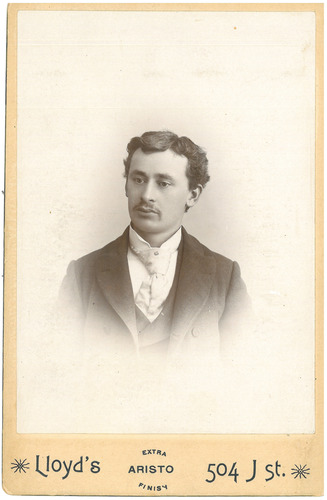
Louis Charles Graeter, founder of Graeter's

Graeter's was founded in 1870 by Louis Charles Graeter, who was of German ancestry, with his wife, Anna. (Note: Louis Charles Graeter was born in 1852, and grew up in Madison, Indiana but moved to Cincinnati as a teenager. His family had immigrated from Baden, Germany in the mid 19th century, and his father Louis was a barber.) At first, he sold the ice cream at the Court Street Market at the base of Sycamore Hill in Cincinnati's Pendleton neighborhood. At the time, ice cream was considered a novelty, but the business quickly gained a following in the neighborhood. The business established a storefront on Sycamore Street. By 1883, the business employed three men and had two wagons delivering ice cream. Around that time, though, Louis Graeter stepped away from the business, taking $1,000 and leaving it in debt. His brother, Fred Graeter, maintained the business after Anna left, bringing it out of debt. Louis Graeter spent time in Stockton, California, where he remarried for a time and eventually returned to Cincinnati around 1900. It was around this time that the ice cream business began producing its product in French pots. Louis Graeter married a third time, to Regina Berger, the daughter of a prominent Cincinnati businessman with a strong reputation in the community. (Note: Anton Berger was president and general manager of Julius J. Bantlin Co., which manufactured saddlery and hardware. Regina Berger was his third child, and 23 years younger than Louis Charles Graeter.) Together, Graeter and his new wife set up a home at 967 East McMillan St. in the Walnut Hills neighborhood of Cincinnati producing and selling ice cream on the bottom floor of the property.

=== Second generation ===
Louis Charles died in 1919 at 67 after being hit by a streetcar, and his wife took over the business while continuing to raise their two sons, Wilmer and Paul. It was at this time that she sought to expand the business, growing the size of the McMillan Street location and opening a second location on Walnut Street in downtown Cincinnati, followed by a third at 2704 Erie Ave. in the Hyde Park neighborhood. By 1929, the shop had locations in Norwood, Madisonville, Avondale, and Pleasant Ridge as well. In order to support the volume of ice cream being produced, the business in 1937 opened an ice cream and chocolate production plant in a former printing press facility on Reading Road in Mount Auburn.

While business remained steady through the Great Depression, the shop faced challenges during World War II thanks to the nationwide rationing of sugar, as well as lack of available manpower. But the shop grew with the population boom after the war and it opened new locations in the Oakley, East End, and Bond Hill neighborhoods after suburban sprawl began in those areas. Still, it closed other store locations as demographic shifts prompted relocation of business.

After World War II, and with new manufacturing processes and the proliferation of the refrigerator, Graeter's faced challenges from competitors who could mass-produce ice cream. Among its competitors was Aglamesis Bro's, another family-owned business opened in Cincinnati, as well as United Dairy Farmers, which grew quickly. Graeter's and Algamesis Bros., in particular, are routinely considered to be rivals in Cincinnati, though the companies are different in size and the style of ice cream they make is different. The invention of soft serve also allowed large national chains like Dairy Queen, Carvel and Tastee-Freez to grow as well. During this time, the shop began operating a bakery with an increasing variety of goods as an added service, and stopped selling toys and other novelties.

=== Third generation ===
Regina Graeter died in 1955. Wilmer bought Paul out of the business, causing some tension within the family. Wilmer's sons, Dick, Lou and Jon were brought in to help with the business. Younger sister Kathy became highly involved in 1965, though another sister, Carol, never worked for the company beyond childhood. The ice cream business slowly gained traction and local popularity through the 1960s. The shops began selling pints that could be taken home. In this time, it faced particular competition from upscale brands with more flavors of ice cream sold in pints that could be taken home, including Baskin-Robbins, Häagen-Dazs and Ben & Jerry's. Still, the company maintained a strong following in Cincinnati in the 1970s and 1980s that prevented these brands from making as strong a retail presence in Cincinnati.

Graeter's first began selling pints of ice cream to stores in the 1970s, most notably a shop in Washington Market Park in the TriBeCa neighborhood of Manhattan, New York, although pints there sold for $8.85, compared to $2.50 at Graeter's own Cincinnati stores. In 1987, a deal with Kroger allowed Graeter's to sell its ice cream inside the supermarket chain. Eventually, its distribution grew to over 2,000 Kroger stores. Graeter's has been marketed in some of Kroger's other brands as well, notably including King Soopers in Colorado. With these deals it has sought to build a national brand awareness and can now be bought in retail stores in 48 states. In some cases this has been successful, such as in Denver where, after a few weeks after introducing 12 flavors, the company was selling five gallons of ice cream a week.

Still, the business had limited growth in the 1980s, primarily because of the popularity of frozen yogurt, in chains including TCBY, brought an appeal for healthier frozen desserts. In this time it also invested in new equipment as well, first testing equipment from Cincinnati-based Alvey Washing Equipment before trying equipment created by Italian company Carpigiani, but eventually opted to bring its "French Pot" production in-house, though it did not patent the equipment.

=== Fourth generation ===
Former logo, used until 2025

By 1989, the company produced 100,000 gallons of ice cream annually and generated $5 million a year in revenue. Jon Graeter retired from the business after an accident that year, and Kathy was brought into the business, as were Bob, Chip and Rich Graeter, sons of Lou and Dick respectively and the fourth generation of the family in the business. Wilmer died in 1991. However, undertaking succession planning with the help of University of Cincinnati experts, the business was not fully transferred to the fourth generation for over a decade. Graeter's built a $2 million expansion onto its Reading Road production facility that doubled the building in size to 25,000 square feet (2,300 m^{2}) in 1994, borrowing $1 million in the process but adding production space for ice cream, candy and more storage. After 1994, the chain began shipping pints of ice cream outside of its store footprint as well, using dry ice-packed containers via United Parcel Service, which allowed it to ship anywhere in the United States. By 2010 they were generating $3 million a year in business, with the largest number of shipments being made to California. The business incrementally began allowing its ice cream to be sold in restaurants in country clubs as well.

Once the fourth generation took the business full-time at the end of 2003, it then undertook a rebranding process rolling out a new logo designed by Libby, Perszyk, Kathman Inc., stronger marketing and a more cohesive strategic direction. They also began to substantially increase production with the new plant, growing from 100,000 gallons a year in 1989 to 200,000 gallons in 2004. Design Forum, a retail design firm, handled updates to Graeter's shops. The plant expansion increased capacity over 40 percent after 2004, allowing it to grow its wholesale business. With these tools, its leaders and franchise owners reported business was not significantly impacted by the Great Recession in 2008 or 2009. At the time it was doing about $20 million a year in sales.

In 2009 the company announced plans to build a new 28,000 square feet (2,600 m^{2}) plant in the Bond Hill neighborhood of Cincinnati to allow it to continue to grow production. The company bought the land for a marginal number, borrowed $10 million from the city with interest rates to be repaid over 20 years, receiving $3.3 million in incentives and providing $10 million in bonds to cover the cost. As Graeter's announced it, they plan to distribute its ice creams outside of the Cincinnati market and to supermarkets in other cities including Denver, Houston, and Atlanta. This expanded its production to 300,000 gallons of ice cream a year, with equipment to expand its capacity to 1.5 million gallons a year. It also features a shrink-wrap facility to allow it to package ice cream to ship faster. By 2010, it had grown to a $35 million business between company owned and franchise locations. Additional technology investments have allowed it to better track its sales and performance of different products and business units. This has also informed a seasonal hiring strategy for the company as it on-boards additional staff for busier seasons. Around this time, it began a more aggressive campaign to grow distribution of its pints into more large U.S. cities outside of the Midwest and grow its national profile.

By 2017, the company was distributing its pints of ice cream in about 6,000 grocery stores, heavily concentrated in Kroger stores, in addition to upscale restaurants and country clubs. The company also began partnering with other local food companies, most notably Braxton Brewing Co., a microbrewery in Covington, Kentucky, to make a Black Raspberry Chip milk stout, a craft beer based on its signature ice cream flavor. This partnership was successful enough that the next year, the two companies collaborated on a pumpkin ale that hearkened to Graeter's seasonal fall ice cream flavor.

In 2018, Graeter's consolidated its company headquarters into a 7,000-square-foot office at 2245 Gilbert Ave. in Walnut Hills, bringing all retail, marketing and creative, production, accounting and finance employees under one roof. That year, it also finalized a deal to purchase 11 stores in Louisville, Lexington and Indianapolis from its last major franchisee, Jim Tedesco of Tedesco LLC, bringing all of its over 50 retail locations under company management.

== Products ==
=== "French pot process" ===
Louis Graeter initially stirred the ice cream by hand in a metal pail in a wooden bucket filled with ice and salt, a painstaking and expensive process owing to the rarity of ice and salt at the time. This required it to be eaten almost immediately. Eventually, though, the business developed what it later called the "French pot process," developing a hand-made, cylindrical metal bowl that sat inside a wooden bowl filled with ice and salt. This pot would then be filled with a mixture of cream, sugar and eggs. The pot would then be attached to a motor and spun, forcing the mixture to the sides of the bowl where it would freeze, being scraped off by paddle until it came together. The ice cream must be made in small batches of 2.5 US gallons (9.5 L; 2.1 imp gal) at a time, then hand-packed into cartons. This results in an ice cream that is more dense and contains 20 to 25 percent air mixed in during the freezing process, as opposed to other styles where 50 percent air is mixed in. Consequently, a pint of Graeter's ice cream weighs 1 pound (0.45 kg), and can be almost twice the weight of other styles. With 14 percent milk fat and high-quality ingredients, the ice cream falls in the "superpremium" segment of the ice cream market.

Graeter's ice cream is made using the French pot method. All their ice creams are created from an egg custard base. After pasteurization, the flavorings are added. The custard and flavoring mixture is placed into two-gallon French pots. The pots are then spun in −14 °F (−26 °C) saltwater, while a blade scrapes the cream that freezes against the sides of the pot. After 15–20 minutes of immersion in the saltwater, any larger additives are mixed in, such as cookie dough or chocolate chips. Ice cream is hand-scooped into pint containers. Graeter's makes 3,200 US gallons (21,000 imperial pints) each day. The shop markets that its ice cream is still made by hand.

=== Ice cream flavors ===
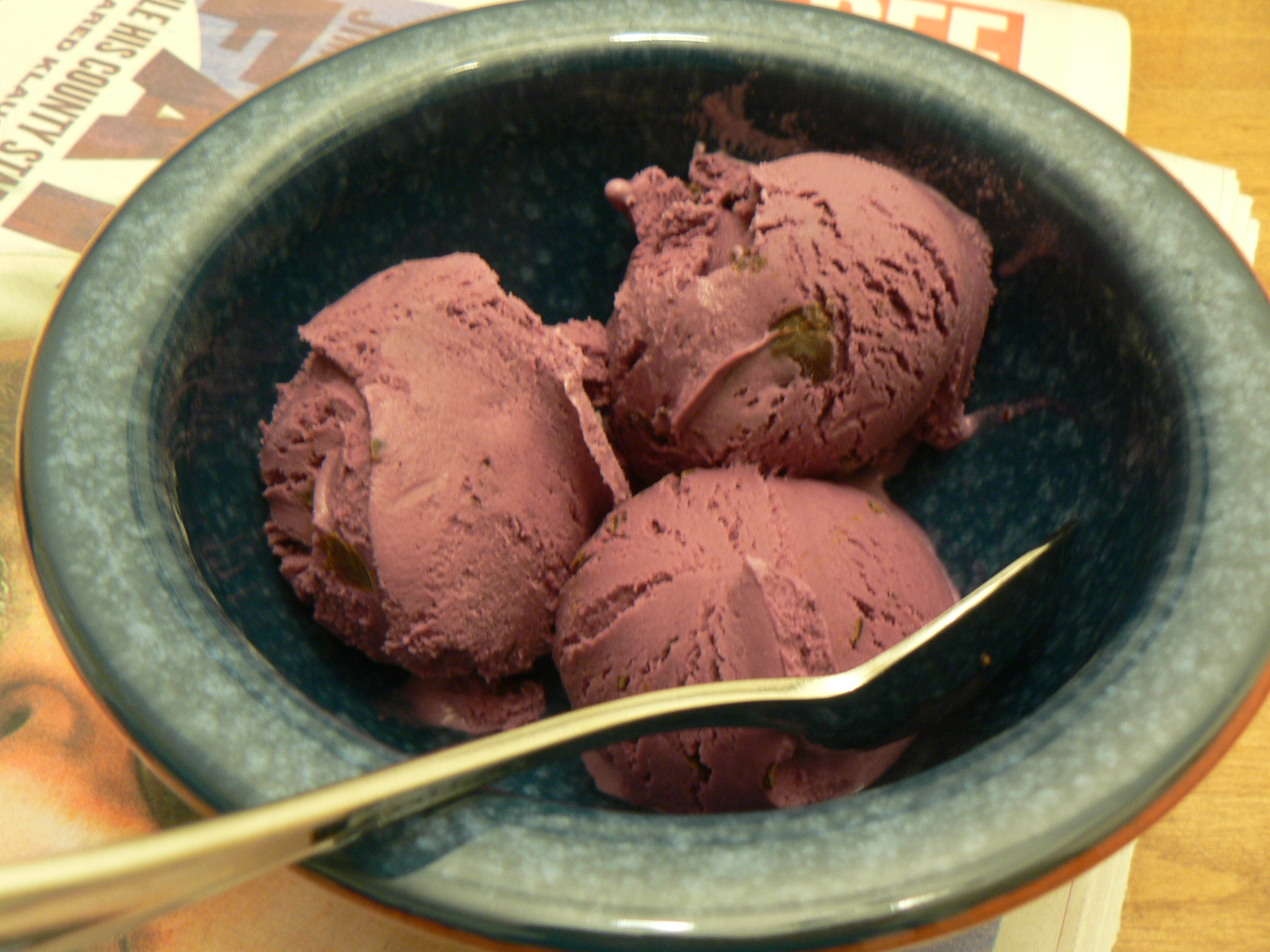
A bowl of black raspberry ice cream with chocolate chips

Initially, the shop offered only vanilla and chocolate flavors in a dish or a cone. It began offering seasonal strawberry, lemon, and peach flavors when the fruits were in season, expanding them to year-round flavors thanks to cold storage capabilities. Graeter's considers eight flavors, including black cherry, coffee, strawberry, butter pecan, and several sorbet flavors, as its original menu. Graeter's sources its dairy products from nearby Louis Trauth Dairy and Smith Dairy, and later made both of them distributors of its ice cream. It has retained its recipe of cream, sugar, eggs and flavorings, and has avoided changing the recipe during health trends or amid competition from healthier frozen treat brands, or those using artificial sweeteners. Though it is gravitated to more all-natural ingredients in recent years, including substituting beet juice instead of food dye and sourcing dairy products from hormone-free cows. There are some exceptions, such as vanilla that is imported from Madagascar. It has continued to out-sell Ben & Jerry's and Häagen-Dazs ice cream at Kroger locations in the Cincinnati market, making the city the only place in the country where those brands are not top sellers in the supermarket.

Instead of adding chocolate chips to the ice cream, Graeter's devised a technique to add melted chocolate mixed with a small amount of vegetable oil near the end of the stirring process, which results in chocolate chunks of different sizes. According to the company's recollections, this technique was created when a young Wilmer Graeter stole chocolate and poured it into a pot of ice cream. For a time, it also molded ice cream into different shapes to serve. These chocolate chips were incorporated into a number of flavors to great success, and by 2010 chocolate chip ice cream flavors accounted for 70 percent of its sales. A bittersweet Hershey-based fudge sauce was created before World War II for use in sundaes, and the company later shifted to using a chocolate from a Nestlé spinoff company, Mr. Peter's. It added parfaits, milkshakes and sodas as well over time. Later, it also introduced gelato, sorbet, and low-glycemic desserts. Dick Graeter first created a black raspberry flavor, and around the 1970s began adding chocolate chips. For a time it sold both varieties but discontinued the first version after the second was more successful. This flavor has since become the best-selling flavor in the chain, accounting for 20 percent of its overall sales by 2010. He also launched a program for seasonal flavors of ice cream, notably beginning with a coconut variety in January, cherry chocolate chip in February, chocolate almond in March and so on. After a time, it instead offered "seasonal" flavors for up to three months at a time, with favorites including strawberry chocolate chip in the springtime, or peppermint or eggnog around the end of the wintertime.

=== Candy and baked goods ===
Louis Graeter also sold chocolate confections from early in its history. The company initially tried to use Hershey chocolate for candy, but due to a lack of availability during World War II it shifted to using chocolate from Mr. Peter's. Among its confections was the opera cream, a variety of cream filled chocolate candy popular in Cincinnati. Today, its chocolates and confections are produced at the Bond Hill plant. Steve Hellmich was hired in 2001 to oversee the operation. For the Easter holiday, the shop offers a "build your own basket" with chocolate bunny, cream eggs, jelly beans, and opera creams. During Easter it also offers a "birds nest" made from chocolate and a mixture of rice and coconut flakes.

A bakery business was launched in 1957, and added and expanded in the 1960s and 1970s, initially to make pies and cakes, but demand for other kinds of goods including rolls, coffee cake, Danish pastry, donuts, bread, cupcakes, éclairs, cookies, cream horns and turnovers. Later, ice cream cakes and ice cream sandwiches grew popular as well. Though, the company's bakery business has not traditionally performed as well as its ice cream, and at times it found the bakery portion of the business losing money. Members of the Graeter family have considered ceasing the business but never came to a conclusive decision.

=== Novelties ===
Under Louis Graeter, a number of other items were initially sold at the store, including ceramics, candy cases, toys and other novelties, primarily to turn a profit in the winter when ice cream sales were slow. When Regina Graeter died in 1955, the company's next generation stopped selling novelty items in a bid to focus more on ice cream, baked goods and chocolates.

== Ice cream shops ==
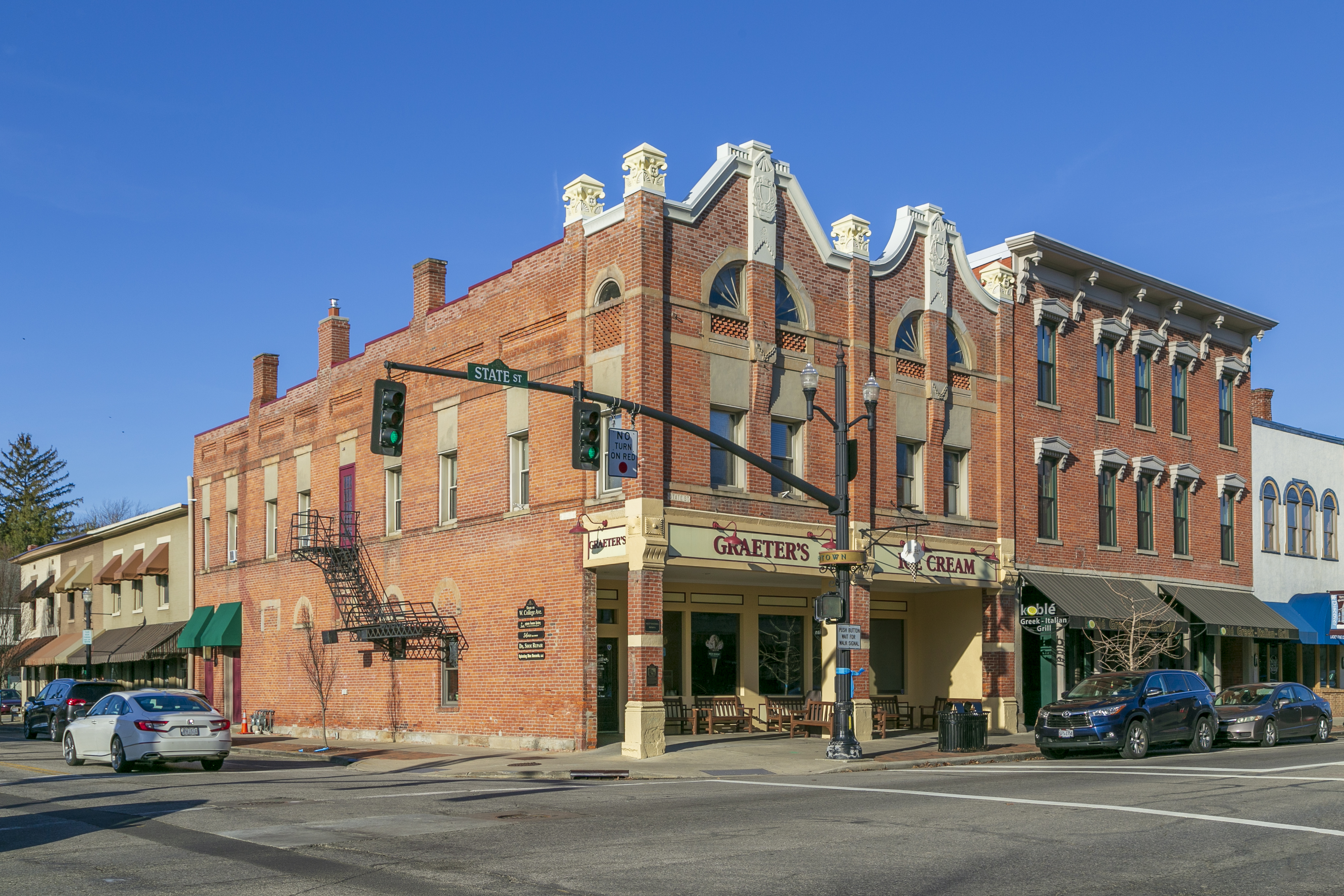
Graeter's in Westerville, Ohio

Graeter's maintained one location on McMillan Street until 1919, when Regina Graeter took control of the business and sought to expand it from a neighborhood shop. By 1929 it had six locations. The original East McMillan Street location where the Graeter family sold its ice cream remained open until 1972, before the property was sold two years later.

In the 1980s, the business also began franchising and through a franchisee opened its first Northern Kentucky locations in 1984. In 1989, another franchisee opened a location in Columbus and, eventually the same franchise was able to add locations in Dayton, with this franchise eventually growing to 15 stores and managing its own ice cream production in a Columbus store by 2000. Yet another franchisee opened a location in Louisville in 1998 after lobbying unsuccessfully to expand the ice cream business into Indianapolis, with that franchisee growing to eight Kentucky locations by 2010. By 2010 it had 45 locations across all of these markets. In 2010, the company bought back the Columbus and Dayton franchises, giving it direct control of all Ohio stores. At the time, it said it did not have plans to add additional franchisees. Graeter family members also said they intended to keep it a family business, resisting offers to sell the company to a larger brand. The 2017 acquisition of the Louisville franchise eliminated the final non-family owned footprint of the ice cream chain. In 2018, a location opened in Cincinnati Union Terminal, in the former Rookwood tea room.

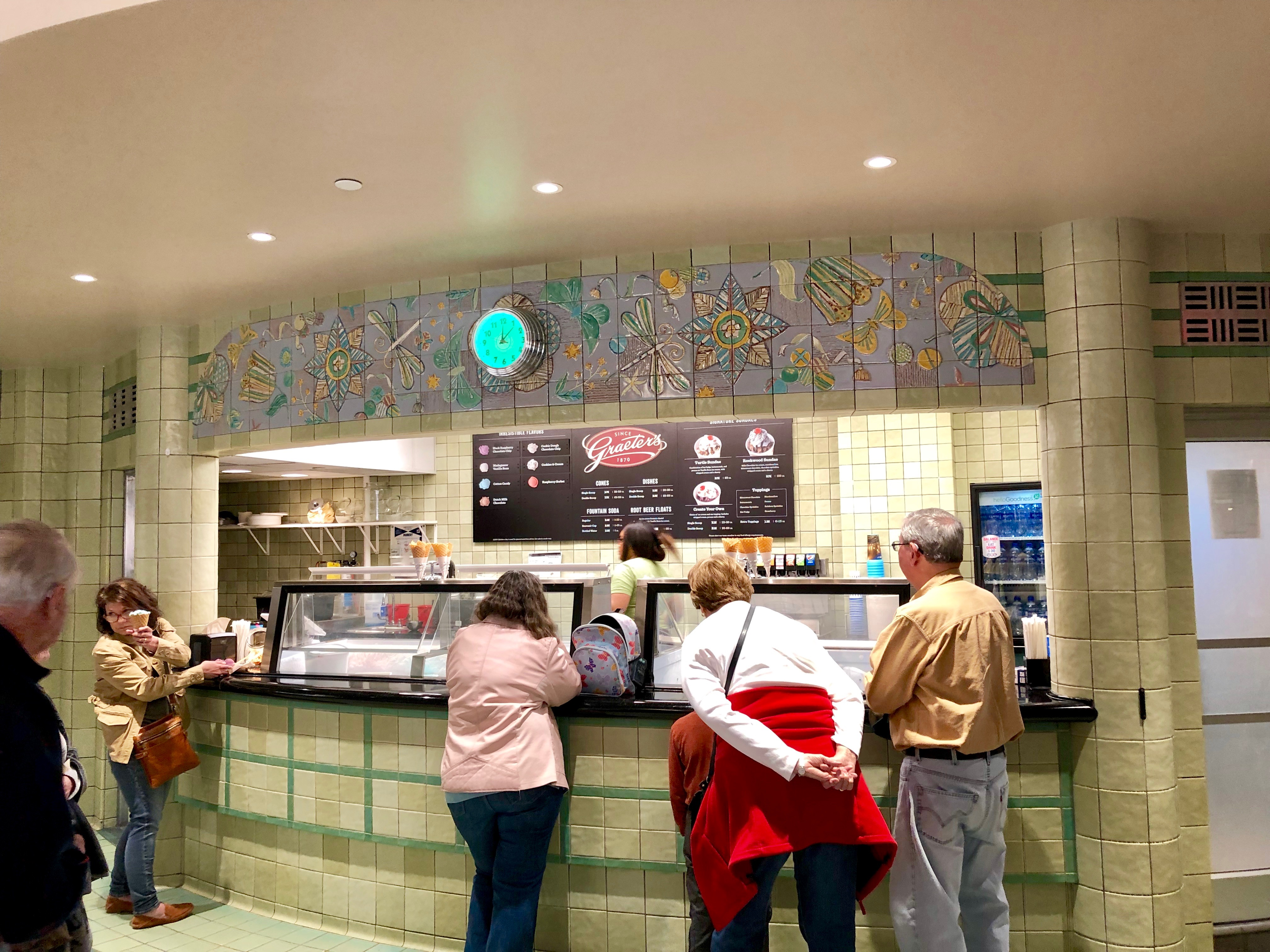
Graeter's in the former Rookwood tea room in the Cincinnati Union Terminal

About 60 percent of the company's $35 million in business in 2010 came from its retail operations, with grocery store sales accounting for 20 percent and shipping another 20 percent. With projected expansion into new markets, though, the company predicted at the time its shipping business could grow to 40 percent of its overall revenue mix.

The company then began expanding its presence online as well, including becoming active on social media. Its Facebook page grew to 55,000 fans by 2010. That grew to 170,000 by 2017, aided by additional social media campaigns on Twitter, YouTube, and Instagram. The company employs a social media manager and built a marketing strategy of engaging with fans online. Otherwise, the company does not invest heavily in traditional marketing campaigns, particularly in its traditional home markets, though does some advertising when it introduces new or seasonal flavors. Loyalty programs and direct mailing campaigns have been introduced over the years as well.

== Reception ==
In 2004, Cincinnati magazine named the black raspberry chip flavor one of the foods which "defines" the city of Cincinnati, alongside Virginia Bakery Schnecken, Trauth Dairy, and Kroger products. The shop is also the official ice cream of the Cincinnati Bengals.

The ice cream has attracted praise from national food writers and tastemakers, as well. Oprah Winfrey praised the ice cream in a 2002 edition of O and also talked about it on her The Oprah Winfrey Show, and the next day the business shipped 400 boxes of ice cream all over the country, 10 times the average. In 2005, food writer David Rosengarten of Gourmet magazine named Graeter's the best ice cream in his newsletter, after getting numerous letters of support for the business. In 2006, Forbes writer and novelist Christopher Buckley also declared black raspberry chip the best ice cream. Vanity Fair recommended it as a holiday gift in 2005, calling it "one of the best homemade-ice-cream companies in the country. Saveur praised Graeter's twice amid a roundup of ice cream shops around the country, while Chicago magazine termed it an essential experience when visiting Cincinnati.

The chain counts Sarah Jessica Parker, George Clooney, Nick Lachey, Kevin Costner, Ashley Judd, and Justin Timberlake as customers. Rosemary Clooney, a family friend and George Clooney's aunt, served as celebrity spokesperson for the company for a time. Ben & Jerry's co-founder Ben Cohen professed Graeter's to be one of his favorite ice cream shops. Other notable fans of the company include singer Harry Connick Jr, and food writer David Rosengarten of Rosengarten Report. Graeter's ice cream won "Best Sweet" at the 2014 Food Network South Beach Wine and Food Festival.

Graeter's has been featured on shows on the Travel Channel, Food Network, Fine Living Channel, and History Channel.
