= Aglamesis Bro's =

Ice cream parlors in Cincinnati, Ohio, US

Aglamesis Brother's
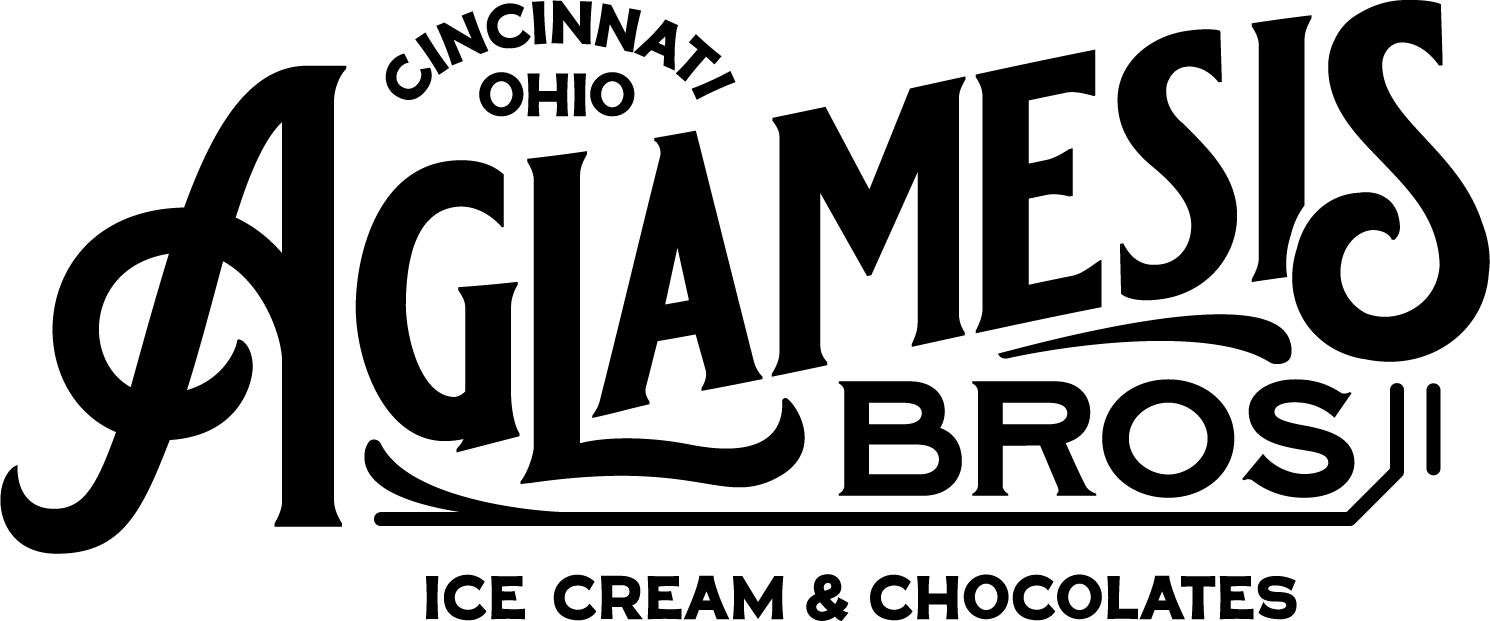
- Trade name: Aglamesis Brother's Ice Cream & Chocolates
- Type: Private
- Founded: 1908; 118 years ago in Norwood, Ohio
- Founders: Thomas and Nicholas Aglamesis
- Headquarters: Cincinnati, Ohio, U.S.
- Number of locations: 3 (2026)
- Area served: Cincinnati, Ohio
- Products: Ice cream, candy, and Milkshakes
- Website: www.aglamesis.com

Aglamesis Brother's, commonly referred to as Aglamesis, is an ice cream parlor in Cincinnati, Ohio with three locations in Oakley, Montgomery, and Hamilton, Ohio. The business was founded by Greek immigrant brothers in 1908. In addition to ice cream, the company also sells milkshakes and candy. The business is currently owned and operated by the Aglamesis family, now in its third generation of ownership.

== History ==
The company was founded by Greek immigrants Thomas and Nicholas Aglamesis. Thomas immigrated from their family farm near Sparta, Greece in 1903; his brother Nicholas joined him in 1905. They joined the community of Greek refugees from the Balkan Wars who had settled around West Fifth Street in downtown Cincinnati.

The brothers worked at a confectionery, Coston's Confectionery, saving money to open their own confectionery business.

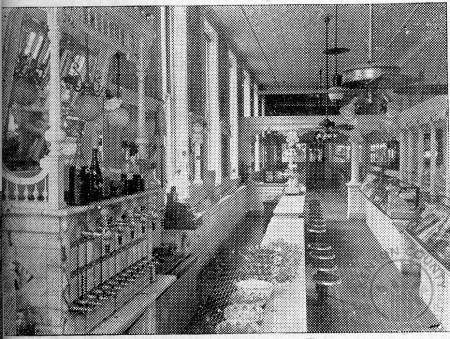
Coston's Confectionery, where the Aglamesis brothers worked before opening their own business

In 1908, with money borrowed on good faith, they opened their first ice cream parlor in Norwood, Ohio, called The Metropolitan.

In 1913, they opened another parlor in nearby Oakley, Cincinnati. The building housing the parlor was one of the first buildings on Oakley Square, and was built by the Aglamesis brothers. They closed the original Norwood location in 1917. Aglamesis Bro's was negatively impacted by sugar rationing during WWII, though their sales increased dramatically post-war. Until the 1950s, the Aglamesis family lived above the parlor. James Aglamesis, son of founder Thomas Aglamesis, took over operation of the business in 1952 when his father experienced a stroke. Thomas died in 1961, preceded in death by Nicholas in 1950. A second location in Montgomery, Ohio was opened in 1970. James's daughter Dianne Lytle manages retail, marketing, and accounting, while her half-brother Randal Young manages manufacturing and wholesale accounts. In modern times, it is considered one of the few surviving "genuine old-fashioned" ice cream parlors in Cincinnati.

=== Historic features ===
The Oakley location retains several features original to its opening state in 1913. The Oakley location has the original hand-laid tile floor as well as its tin ceiling. Other original features include marble-topped tables, a candy counter, and soda fountain.

It also still has Tiffany lamps that were purchased in the 1920s. Seating is on traditional ice-cream parlor chairs with wire backs twisted into heart shapes.

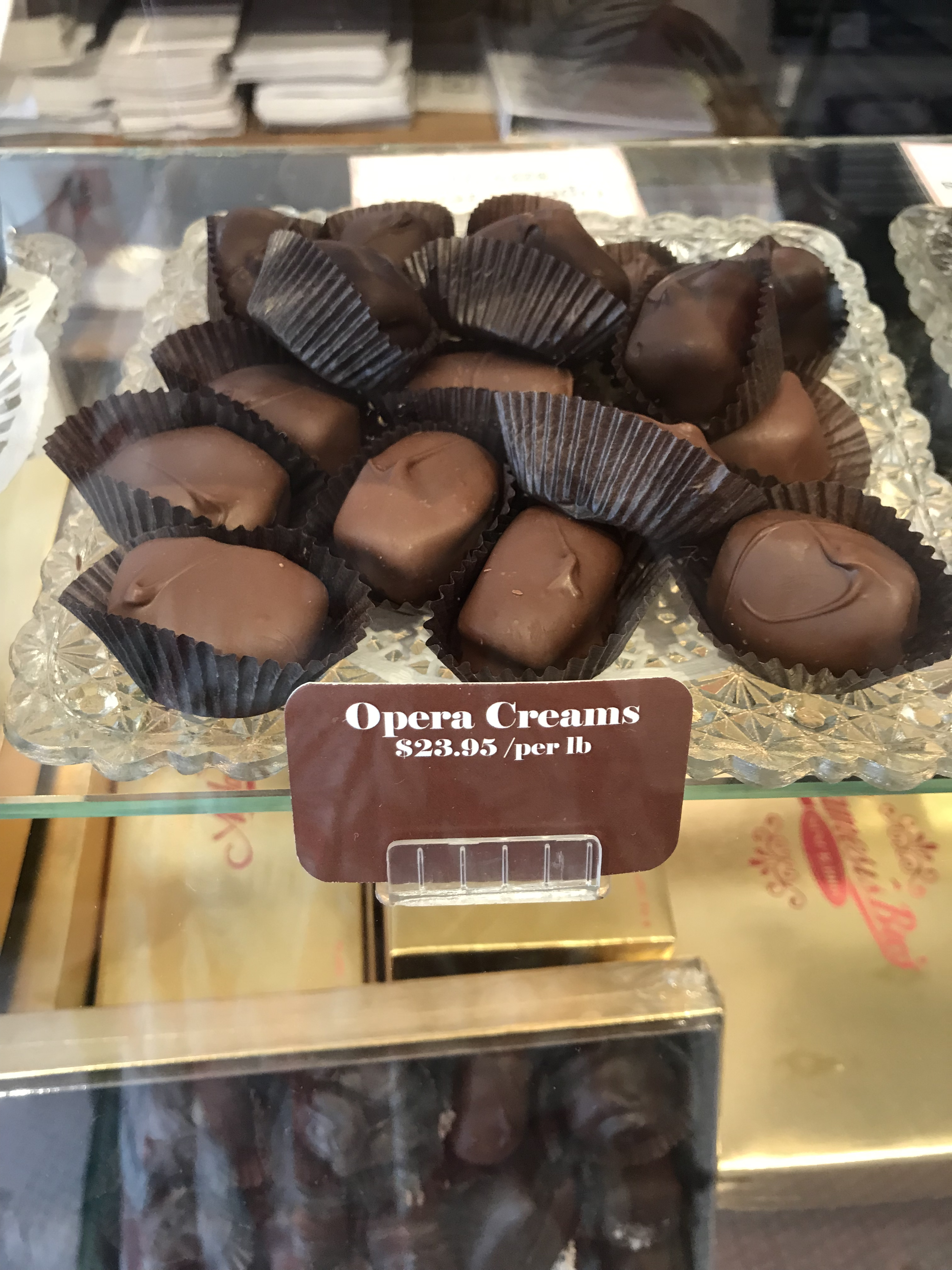
Chocolate Candies

== Distinctions ==
In 2014 the New York Times called them one of the "precious few real ice cream parlors left" alongside Fentons Creamery, Yarnell's, and Toscanini's, calling out their fancy dishware and twisted-wire parlor chairs. Additionally, the New York Times has referenced the business three times in their "What's Doing In" travel column in 1976, 1988, and 1999. In 2008, the Aglamesis Bro's was featured on Modern Marvels on the History Channel. Additionally, as of 2008, the Ohio Department of Agriculture noted that they were the last ice cream parlor in Ohio to make their ice cream from scratch. The magazine Bon Appétit included Aglamesis Bro's on their list of the "last authentic ice cream parlors in the United States", and Chocolatier magazine called them one of the top 25 ice creams in the United States. Taste of Home included Aglamesis Bro's on their list of "America’s Best Soda Fountains from Coast to Coast". Al Gore visited for a photo op during his 2000 presidential campaign.

A Gibson Greetings birthday card once pictured a boy and a girl drinking soda at Aglamesis Bro's.

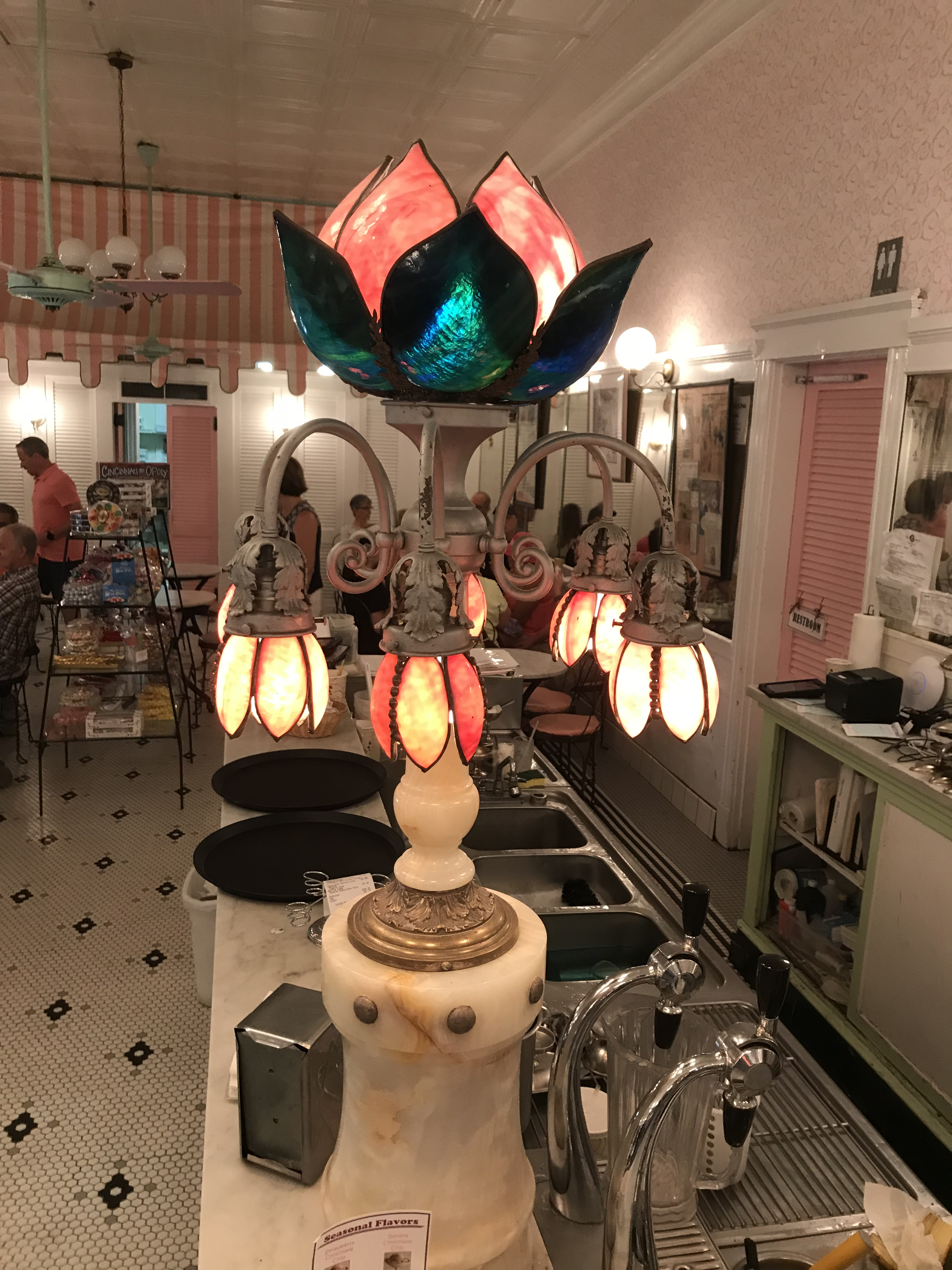
Oakley Location

In 2016, Aglamesis Bro's was featured in an exhibit in the National Hellenic Museum titled "Sweet Home Chicago: The History of America’s Candy Capital". While the exhibit was focused on the culture of candy in Chicago, the National Hellenic Museum expanded the exhibit by adding eight panels about the role of Greek immigrants in developing candy and ice cream shops in the United States.

In addition to Thomas and Nicholas Aglamesis, other Greek immigrants included were Leo Stefanos (founder of Dove chocolate brand), and Leonidas Kestekides (founder of chocolate company Leonidas).

== Products ==
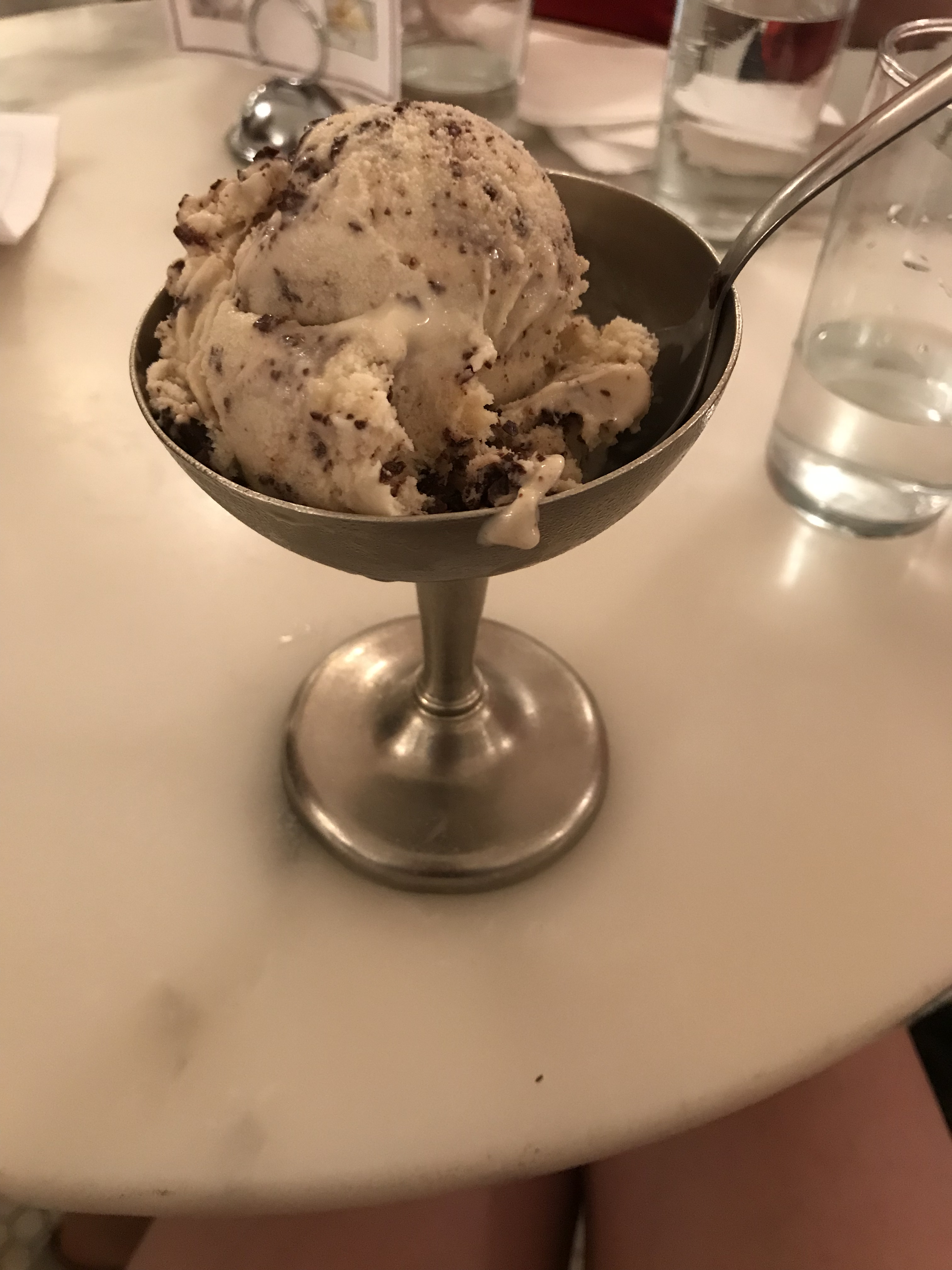
Banana chocolate chip ice cream served at Aglamesis Bro's

In addition to ice cream, Aglamesis Bro's have also produced hand-dipped chocolates since 1908. In 2003, it was estimated that they utilized 22,000 lb (10,000 kg) of chocolate per year producing candies. Their most popular candy sold is the opera cream—a cream, butter, and sugar center coated in dark chocolate. In 1997, their opera creams were deemed best in Cincinnati by The Cincinnati Enquirer among ten contestants. As of 1990, James Aglamesis estimated they produced 400 US gal (1,500 L) of ice cream per week during the summer.

According to St. Louis Post-Dispatch food writer (and former Cincinnatian) Daniel Neman, comparing them to the much larger local chain Graeter's, "(a) lot of Cincinnatians will tell you that the best tasting ice cream is actually found at Aglamesis Bros."

== Locations ==
As of 2024, Aglamesis Bro's has three locations. In addition to the original shop in Oakley Square, a second location was opened in the Montgomery Square Shopping Centre in 1970. In July 2024, it was announced Aglamesis Bro's would be expanding to a third location in Hamilton, Ohio.
