= The Mad Optimist =

American manufacturing company

- Formerly: Soapy Soap Company
- Type: Privately held company
- Industry: Cosmetics and personal care manufacturing
- Founded: April 19, 2012; 14 years ago in Bloomington, Indiana, United States
- Founders: Mohammed M. Mahdi (CEO); Mohammed A. Mahdi (COO); Anthony Duncan (CMO)
- Headquarters: Terre Haute, Indiana, United States
- Area served: Worldwide
- Products: Bar Soaps; Bath Soaks; Body Sprays; Lip Balms
- Brands: Bloomington Label Tech; Design My Soap; Sabun; The Mad Optimist
- Services: Contract manufacturing; Custom formulation; Private labeling
- Website: www.themadoptimist.com

The Mad Optimist is an American manufacturer of organic soaps and personal care products. The company allows customers to choose ingredients going into their products as well as the product's price.

The company was originally founded in Bloomington, Indiana, in 2012 under the name Soapy Soap Company by two brothers, Mohammed M. and Mohammed A. Mahdi, and Anthony Duncan.

The company claims their products does not contain synthetic fragrance, dyes, artificial preservatives, parabens, or phthalates. They are ought to be vegan, halal, cruelty-free, and gluten-free.

== History ==
In April 2012, The Mad Optimist created the brand Sabun

In mid 2016, the company created the brand DesignMySoap.com which offered customized personal care products.

The company was part of the 2017 cohort of Cincinnati, Ohio–based startup accelerator, The Brandery.

In 2018 the company partnered with global brand design agency LPK who helped it rebrand as The Mad Optimist.

On May 15, 2020, The company featured on ABC's Shark Tank, Season 11 Finale Episode 24. Shark and billionaire entrepreneur Mark Cuban offered to invest $60,000 for 20% equity stake in their business.

== Awards ==
- Transform Awards North America 2019-Best visual identity from the FMCG sector: Silver – The Mad Optimist
- Indiana Small Business Development Center (ISBDC): 2014 EDGE Award Winner for the category of Established Business. Awarded June 19, 2015.
