= Cuvier Press Club Building =

- Cuvier Press Club
- U.S. National Register of Historic Places
- Cincinnati Local Historic Landmark
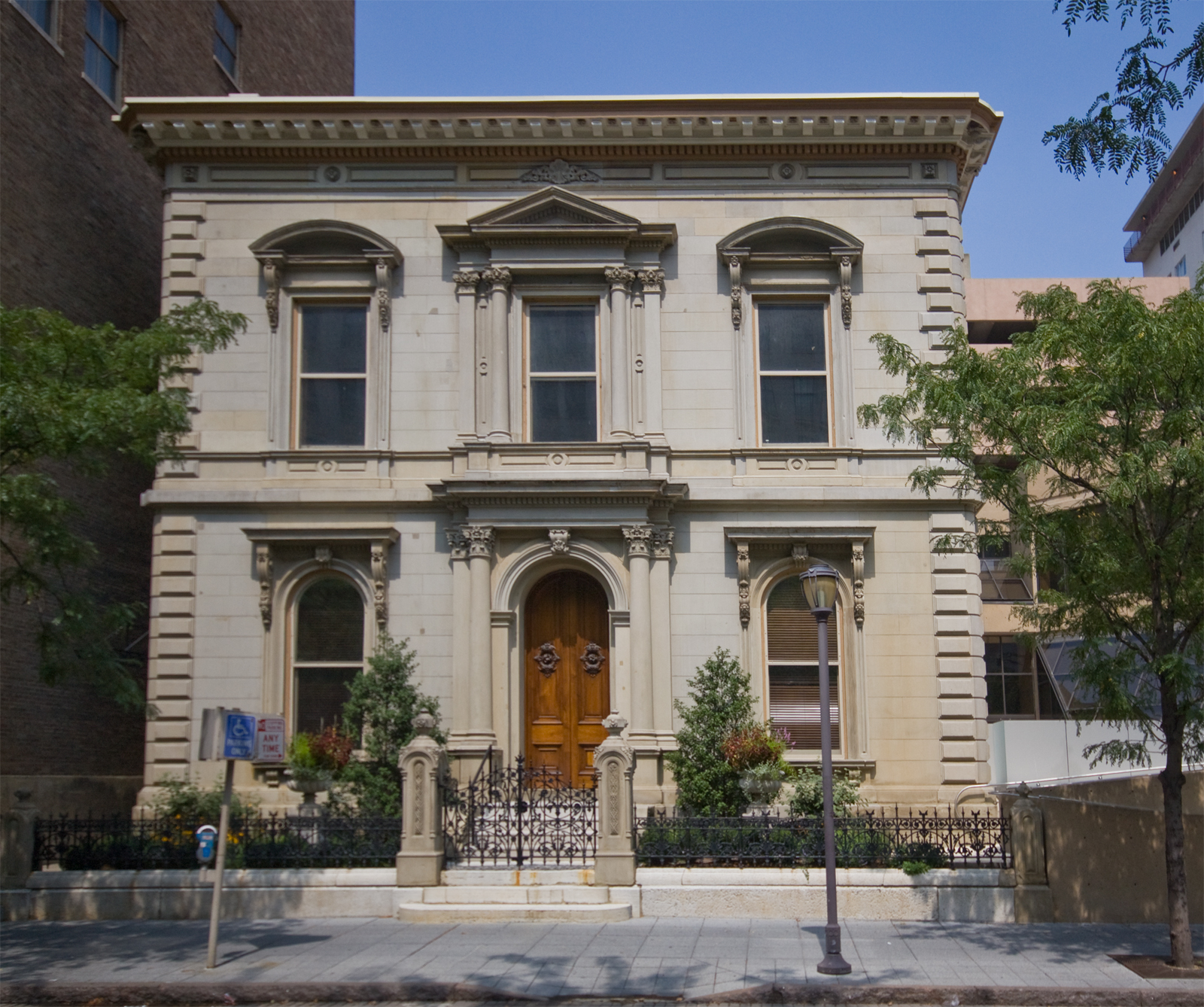

- Location within Ohio Location within the United States
- Location: 22 Garfield Pl., Cincinnati, Ohio
- Coordinates: 39°6′17″N 84°30′52″W
- Area: less than one acre
- Built: 1861
- Architect: Marcus Fecheimer
- Architectural style: Italianate
- MPS: Samuel Hannaford and Sons TR in Hamilton County
- NRHP reference No.: 72001019
- Added to NRHP: October 26, 1972

The Cuvier Press Club, located at 22 Garfield Place is a historic former house in Cincinnati, Ohio, United States. It is also referred to locally as the Fechheimer Mansion and as of 2006 served as the headquarters location for Cincinnati-based firm LPK.

== Design and construction ==
The 2-story stone mansion was originally owned by the Fechheimer family. Marcus Fechheimer commissioned Samuel Hannaford and Edwin Anderson to design the townhouse. It is reportedly the oldest surviving residence designed by Hannaford, who also designed many public facilities in the region including Music Hall, City Hall, and the Cincinnati Observatory. Two stories tall, the frontispiece possess many Neoclassical details, such as Corinthian columns and pilasters, as well as Corinthian details in the cornice, entablature, and pediment. The style is described as Italian Renaissance with a stone wall facade, Italian tile floor, and marble fireplaces. Many similar houses were built at the same time but have lost their architectural integrity; the Fechheimer House is significant partly because it retains so much of its original style and construction. When it was built, it was one of many residences on its street, but all others have since been destroyed.

== Non-residential uses ==
In 1938, Cincinnati's Cuvier Press Club moved into the building from their former location on Opera Place.

The building was listed in the National Register of Historic Places on October 26, 1972. One year later, the building was acquired by the City of Cincinnati and re-opened as a Senior Citizens' Center.

The building was purchased by advertising agency LPK in 2005 and a redesign was begun to conjoin the neighboring Butterfield Center into headquarters and meeting space for the agency.
