= Butterfield Center =

Coordinates: 39°6′17″N 84°30′54″W

The Butterfield Center is a New Brutalist structure in downtown Cincinnati.

Designed by University of Cincinnati architecture professors David Lee Smithand Donald E. Stevens, the building promotes the structural and systems materials (concrete, ductwork, etc.) themselves by leaving them exposed.

The Butterfield Recreation Center (also known as the Butterfield Nutrition Center, also known as the Butterfield Senior Center) was closed in 2004 as a result of push to cut $4.2 million from the budgets of several city departments

In 2005, design firm Libby Perszyk Kathman (LPK) purchased the Butterfield Center along with the Marcus Fechheimer House, with the vision to conjoin the buildings and create a new headquarters and meeting space.

The Fechheimer House, which is also known locally as the Cuvier Press Club, also served as a part of the senior citizens' center from 1977 until 2004. LPK restored the Fechheimer mansion and commissioned Cincinnati firm FRCH Design Worldwide to plan the design for the connection of the two buildings.
