= Loard's Ice Cream =

Ice cream shop in Oakland, California

- Industry: Ice cream and sandwich shop
- Founded: 1950
- Founder: Russ Salyards
- Headquarters: 2825 MacArthur Blvd., Oakland, California, U.S.
- Owner: Winnie and Brian Tam
- Website: loards.com

Loard's Ice Cream is a historic ice cream shop located at 2825 MacArthur Blvd., Oakland, California. The business was founded in 1950.

== History ==
U.S. Army veteran, former Fuller Brush man, and former UC Berkeley accounting employee Russell Salyards and his business partner, John Low, founded Loard's on June 22, 1950. The shop's name was a combination of the men's last names. In 1952, Salyards won gold in the California State Fair's "Ice Cream and Dairy Products" category. Over the next 20 years, Salyards would single-handedly operate 12 locations, the original stores being in Oakland, Alameda, Castro Valley, Orinda, and Livermore. Loard's produces its own ice cream and candy at a plant in San Leandro. In June 2025, it was announced that Loard's would be adding a sandwich counter, run by WesLo's, to its shop.

== Menu ==
Flavors offered at Loard's include peanut brittle, caramel corn, butterscotch marble, lime rickey, brownie nut fudge, cookie dough, mango, burgundy cherry, strawberry, lemon chiffon, and black raspberry marble.
