= James W. Faulkner =

American journalist and reporter (1863–1923)

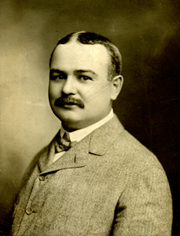
- James W. "Jim" Faulkner, circa 1893, first president of the Ohio Legislative Correspondents Association.
- Born: James W. Faulkner; April 6, 1863; Cincinnati, Ohio, U.S.
- Died: May 5, 1923 (aged 60); New York City, New York, U.S.
- Other names: Jim Faulkner, "Jeems"
- Education: St. Xavier High School (Cincinnati), Doctor of Letters Miami University, September 1919
- Occupations: Newspaperman, Journalist, Political Writer
- Notable credit: Faulkner Letter
- Title: "Dean of Ohio Political Writers"

James W. Faulkner (April 6, 1863 – May 5, 1923) was an American political journalist from Cincinnati, Ohio, whose career spanned local politics in Cincinnati and state politics in Ohio' his writings covered the presidential campaigns of both parties from 1892 through 1920. He started his newspaper career with The Cincinnati Times-Star, and in 1887 he joined the Cincinnati Enquirer. In 1890 at the age of 27 he was assigned to Columbus, Ohio to report on the Ohio General Assembly and state politics. He observed many lobbyists had invaded the chambers of the legislature by posing as newspapermen, causing special interest group influence on the floor of the House and Senate. He formed the Ohio Legislative Correspondents Association, which required newsmen to submit credentials before gaining floor privileges, and served as its president for 24 years.

Faulkner covered every political convention for both parties from 1892 to his death in 1923. Aside from writing political editorial columns Faulkner wrote articles for various publications during his career.

== Early life ==
James "Jim" Faulkner was born in 1863 to Irish immigrants John Faulkner and Ellen O'Connell (from County Cork, Ireland) in Cincinnati. His father operated the Gibson House on the south side of Fountain Square where he was born. He was a philosopher of sorts at an early age. While chopping wood with an axe at the age of thirteen, he accidentally severed a finger. The wound was tended to but Faulkner lost the finger. Later in life he told a reporter that, after he got over the scare, he thought, "Well I am minus a finger, but nobody is going to make me practice piano for three hours a day!" Faulkner attended parochial elementary schools and graduated from St. Xavier High School in Cincinnati.

Faulkner worked as a telephone operator at the Ninth Street Police Station. He got his first newspaper job at the Cincinnati Times-Star in 1884 although some sources claim he got his start in the newspaper business in 1887. He tutored David Graham Phillips at The Cincinnati Enquirer circa 1888 to 1890.

== Journalism career ==
In 1887 he joined the Cincinnati Enquirer and in 1890 went to Columbus as a reporter of politics and events at the Ohio Legislature and Statehouse.

Faulkner observed the legislature and statehouse staff were "cowed by lobbyists for special interest groups…buttonholing lawmakers in session…and people who posed as newspapermen acting as lobbyists…. In 1893 he formed the Ohio Legislative Correspondents' Association, an organization which required newsmen were to pass on their credentials before they could gain access to the floor of the House and Senate. Faulkner served as the organization's first president and held the post for 24 years. He wrote a weekly piece called the "Faulkner Letter" which ran on Sundays in The Cincinnati Enquirer. He attended every national political convention of the major parties from 1892 on, and since 1896 had accompanied presidential candidates on their campaign speaking tours.

Faulkner was on terms of personal friendship with every U.S. president since Grover Cleveland and was a special friend of Warren G. Harding. He was asked by a number of Ohio Governors and one U.S. president to accept commissions in their administrations, but politely declined each time. His reason was he wanted to stay in newspaper work. He was also a director of Citizen's Trust and Savings Bank in Columbus, Ohio.

He was named the editor-in-chief of The Toledo Commercial on August 23, 1899.

Faulkner travelled with William Jennings Bryan, in 1914, while he was Secretary of State. During World War I, was appointed a member of the Ohio Council of National Defense by Governor James M. Cox and was a member of several committees and commissions within the council.

Miami University at Oxford conferred Honorary Doctor of Letters on him September 17, 1919. He was known as the Dean of the correspondents. Faulkner was a member of Gov. Cox's presidential train party in 1920.

== Personal life ==
Besides his professional journalistic memberships Faulkner was also a member of the Cuvier Press Club, the Benevolent and Protective Order of Elks, Lodge No. 5. He also served as board of commissioners for the Cincinnati Police from 1898 to 1902. In politics, Faulkner was a member of the Democratic Party. Faulkner never married.

== Death and funeral ==
"The passing of James W. Faulkner takes away one of the most notable correspondents of the present day. He wielded a very forceful pen, and had a keen sense of news value which led him into the very heart of many interesting problems, notably in politics"
—President Warren G. Harding, Statement upon learning of the death of James W. Faulkner

While attending the American Newspaper Publisher's Association convention, at the Waldorf-Astoria Hotel in New York, Faulkner became ill, complaining of indigestion. He stayed at the hotel and was attended by a physician, but died during night on May 5, 1923, of a heart attack. Upon his death, many notable statements were issued by President Harding, Governor Alvin V. Donahey, and former governors James A. Cox and Judson Harmon.

Faulkner's body was escorted from New York to Cincinnati by his sisters, Mary and Martha Faulkner. The body was taken to the home of Thomas J. Mulvihill, his brother-in-law and an undertaker, where the viewing would take place. The Requiem Mass was celebrated at St. Xavier Church in Cincinnati and burial was at Calvary Cemetery. The funeral was attended by former Ohio governors, many newspaper officials, Cincinnati City leaders. His pallbearers were: William F. Wiley, Herbert R. Mengert, Jasper C. Muma, Robert F. Wolfe, Judson Harmon, James M. Cox, William A. Stewart, Bayard L. Kilgour, William Alexander Julian, Russell A. Wilson, W. F. Burdell and Nicholas Longworth. On orders from Washington, DC the Stars and Stripes at the local Federal building in Cincinnati was displayed at half-mast during Faulkner's funeral – the first time in the history of Cincinnati that the flag had been lowered as a mark of respect for a private citizen.

== James W. Faulkner Scholarship ==
As Faulkner had helped many young newspaper reporters early in their careers, following his death, many newspapermen desired to form a memorial fund to provide scholarships to journalism students. A Memorial Fund to aid Journalism students was organized by friends who were in the Ohio Legislative Correspondents Association. Former Ohio Governor and newspaper owner James M. Cox served as its first chairman. Two scholarships are awarded annually to Ohio journalism students.

== Other honors ==
- James W. Faulkner was inducted into the Ohio Journalism Hall of Fame October 31, 1930.
- The James W. Faulkner Enterprise Award, an award for the best enterprise story which exhibited special effort by the reporter was named for him in 1967.
