= Cuvier Press Club =

Social club in Cincinnati, Ohio, US

The Cuvier Press Club was a Cincinnati, Ohio social club created in 1911 when the members of the Cuvier Club merged with the members of the Pen and Pencil Club.

From 1911 to 1938, the club was located on Opera Place. In 1938, the club moved to 22 Garfield Place, which would come to be known as the Cuvier Press Club.

Among other activities, the Club held an annual Halloween parade, which was attended by a crowd of approximately 50,000 in downtown Cincinnati, all of whom were presumably unaware of the fear that gripped the nation during the infamous 1938 "War of the Worlds" radio broadcast by Orson Welles.

A 1947 article from the Cincinnati Post includes a note that, during a 2-day time period, the club had experienced the deaths of 3 of its members: William C. Lambert, Stuart Heckerman, and Don G. Gardner.

== Notable members ==
- Edward G. Feinthel, WLW executive
- Allen Lishawa, Ohio deputy tax commissioner
- Arthur C. Church, attorney and former prosecutor for the city of Wyoming (OH)
- James W. Faulkner, American political journalist from Cincinnati, Ohio.
- Henry Hanna, industrialist, philanthropist

== Past presidents ==
- Bill McCluskey, Cincinnati WLW talent office
