= Opera cream =

American chocolate candy

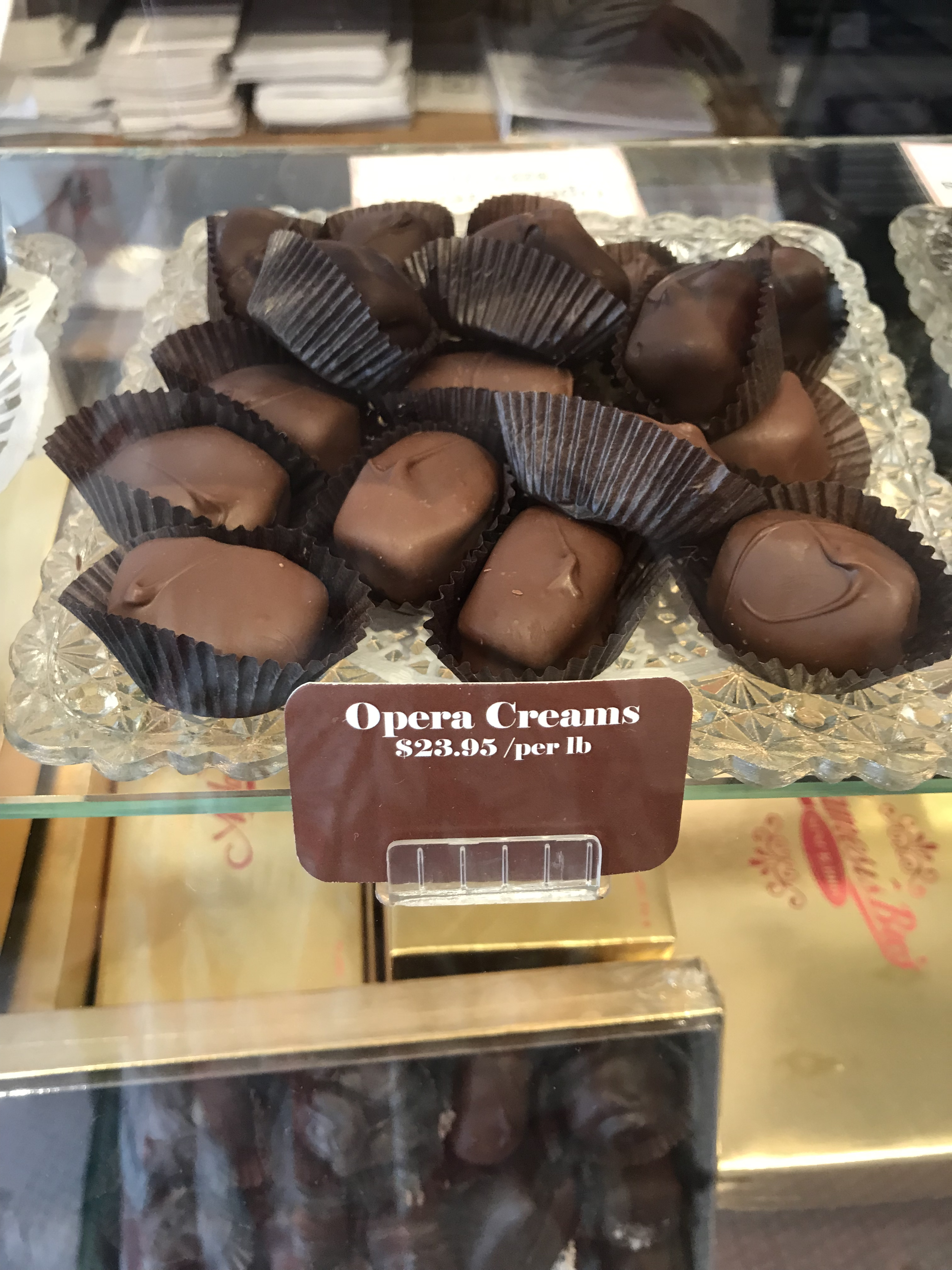
Opera cream candies sold at Cincinnati confectionery Aglamesis Bro's

Opera creams are a candy made of chocolate. They are most popularly associated with Cincinnati, Ohio, though they are sold in other Ohio cities, as well as Kentucky.

== History ==
Sources vary on whether the Cincinnati opera cream was invented by Bissinger's or the Robert H. Putnam Company, both Cincinnati confectioneries, though Dann Woellert notes that the first local advertisements for the candy was in 1924 by Putman's. A legend for how the candies got their name states that they were given to opera-goers at the Cincinnati Music Hall for free at intermission. They are a popular candy in Cincinnati confectioneries such as Schneider's Sweet Shop and Aglamesis Bro's; they've been called the "most Cincinnati of all sweets". They are also produced by Esther Price Candies, however, which is based in Dayton, Ohio. Chris A. Papas & Son, a Covington, Kentucky business, lists the opera cream Easter egg as their most popular Easter egg variety.

== Composition ==
The center of an opera cream is made of cream, sugar, vanilla, and a marshmallow cream. The exterior of the opera cream is milk, dark, or white chocolate. The creation of opera creams occurs in four stages. The ingredients for the center—cream, sugar, and vanilla—are heated in a double boiler to create what's called a "fondant". Once cooled, the fondant mixture is kneaded in a ball cream beater, which is a kind of horizontal circular mixer. In the third stage, the fondant is parsed into small pieces to form the cream center. Lastly, the cream center is coated in chocolate.

== Variations ==
The usual form of the opera cream is a rectangular chocolate, with dark, milk, and white chocolate varieties produced. However, around the Easter holiday, opera cream Easter eggs are popular, with some varieties of opera cream egg weighing up to 3 lb (1.4 kg). Other food and drink products are created based on the opera cream, including cakes, cupcakes, and flavored beer stouts. The BonBonerie Bakery in Cincinnati makes and sells up to eighty 9 in (23 cm) opera cream cakes per day during the winter holiday season.

== See also ==
- Buckeye candy
- List of candies
