= Black raspberry ice cream =

Ice cream flavor

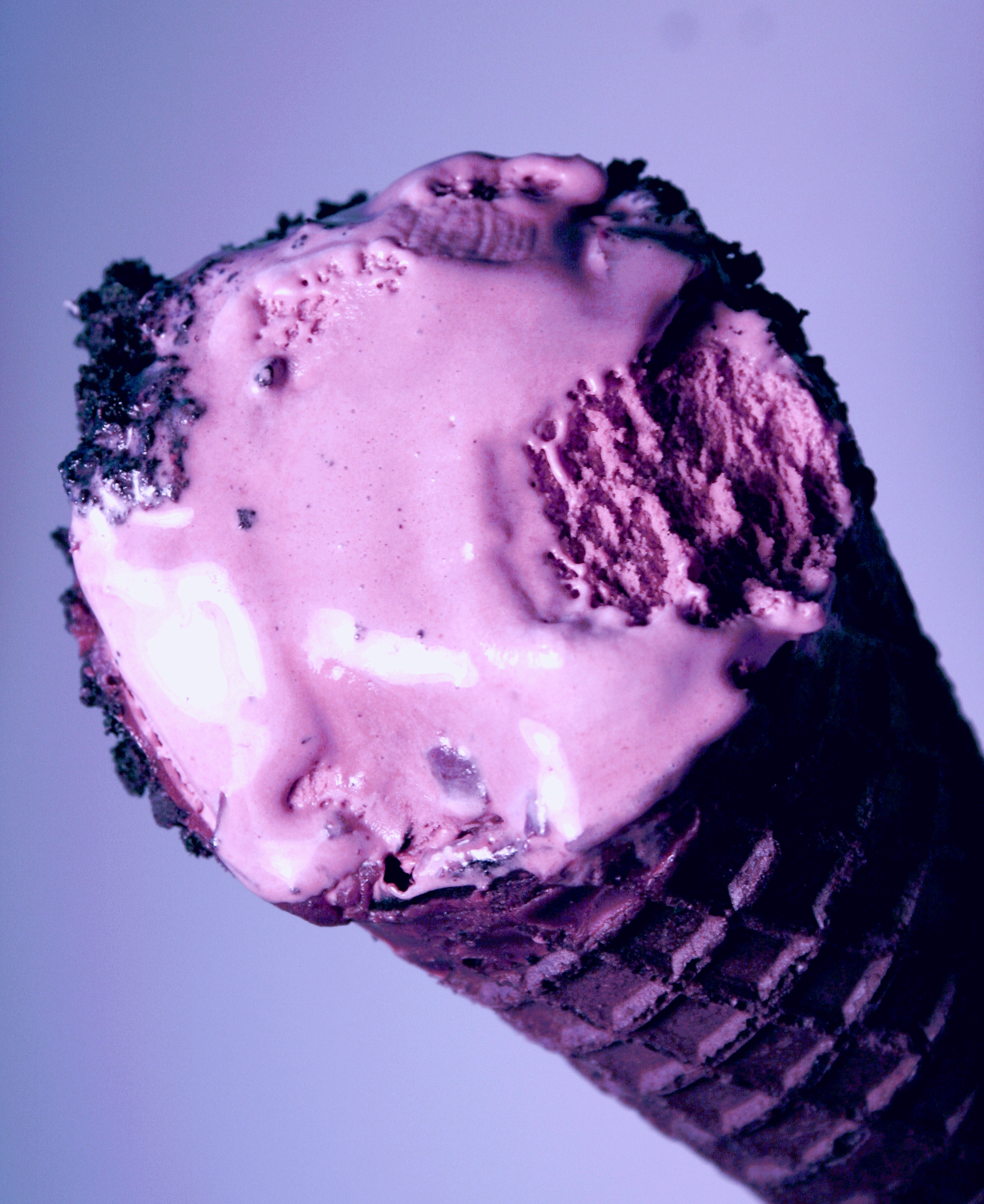

Black raspberry ice cream is an ice cream flavor made with black raspberries and typical ice cream ingredients. It may be served with chocolate chips and is especially popular in New England.

== History ==
Black raspberry is considered a regional ice cream flavor of New England, where it is commonly served in ice cream parlors, but can also be found elsewhere. The type of raspberry used to prepare the ice cream is uncommon in the wild in New England and is only available for a short season, which would have made it a rare treat and possibly contributed to the flavor's popularity.

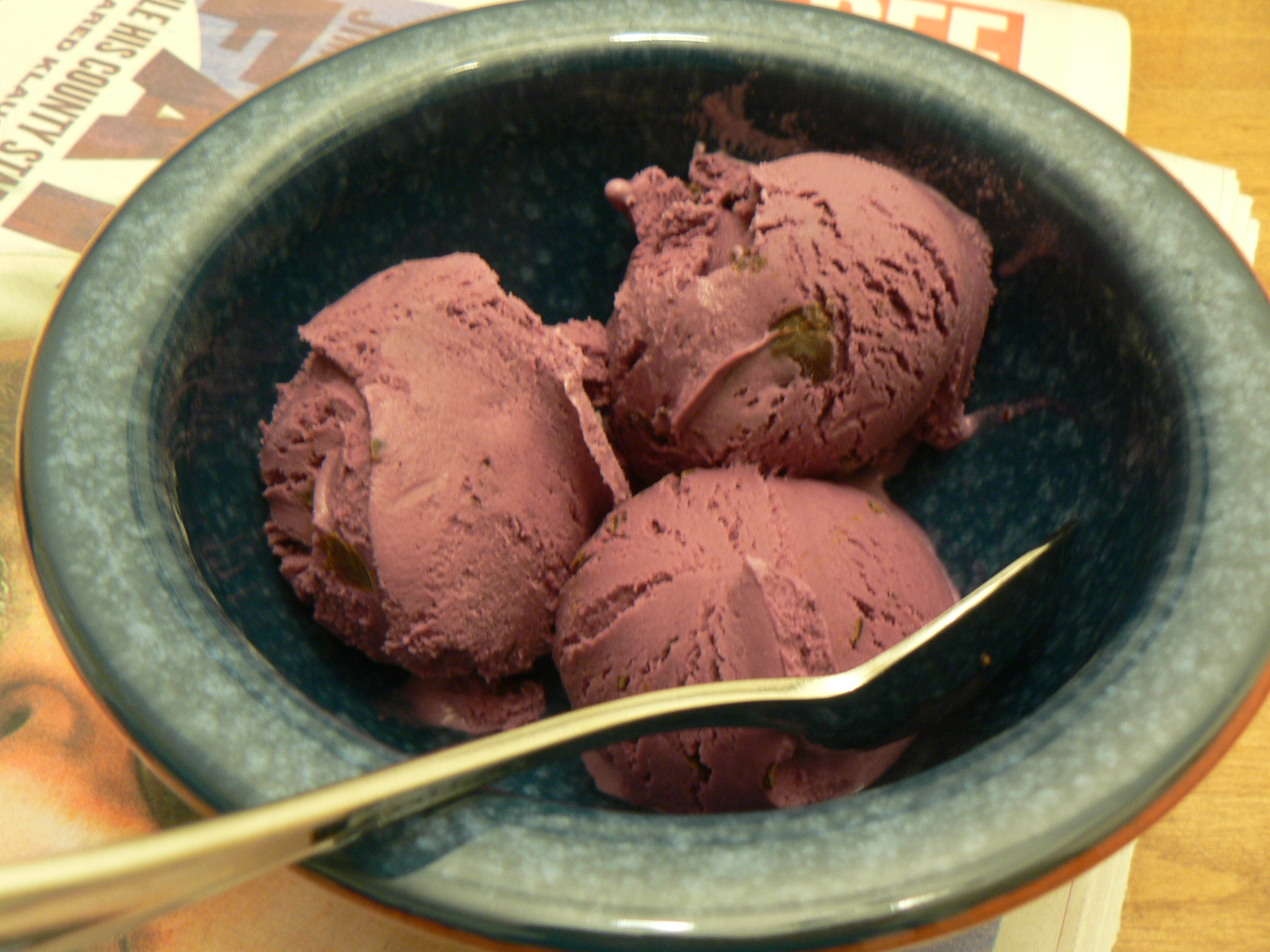
A bowl of Graeter's black raspberry ice cream with chocolate chips.

Black raspberry ice cream is often combined with chocolate chips; black raspberry chocolate chip is the signature flavor of the ice cream chain Graeter's. In 2024, Tim Philpott, vice president of marketing at Graeter's, reported that this particular flavor comprises 18 to 20% of the company's sales. Graeter's has also offered other variations, including the black raspberry chip donut and their first bonus flavor, black raspberry cookies and cream.
