= Transform magazine =

UK magazine

- Editor: Jack Cousins
- Frequency: Monthly
- Format: Trade magazine
- Founded: 2014
- Company: Cravenhill Publishing
- Country: UK
- Based in: London
- Website: https://www.transformmagazine.net/

Transform magazine is a quarterly global print and online business magazine covering brand strategy and design. It is published by Cravenhill Publishing, an independent publishing company, which also publishes Communicate (magazine). It is targeted to brand design and strategy agencies and in-house brand and marketing professionals.

== History ==
In 2009, Cravenhill Publishing launched the inaugural Transform Awards, to celebrate rebranding, repositioning and brand transformation. In 2014 the company launched Transform magazine, which coincided with the global expansion of the awards programme. It was shortlisted at the PPA Independent Publisher Awards 2014, in both the Best Launch or Relaunch category and the Front Cover of the Year category.

== The Transform Awards ==
Transform magazine organises the Transform Awards benchmarking brand strategy and creativity. The awards programs take place in the following cities for the following markets.

- For Europe, held annually in London. Launched 2009
  2020 Grand Prix winner - Scala Radio and Thinkfarm
  2020 Best Overall Visual Identity winner - Aktuel and Brand Brothers
- For Middle East and Africa, held annually in Dubai. Launched 2014
  2020 Grand Prix winner - DXB (Dubai Airports) and Landor&Fitch
  2020 Best Overall Visual Identity winner - ila by Bank ABC and Superunion
- For Asia, held annually in Shanghai. Launched in 2014.
  2020 Grand Prix winner - Volkswagen Group China and MetaDesign China Limited
  2020 Best Overall Visual Identity winner - Tencent Music Entertainment and Superunion
- For North America, held annually in New York. Launched in 2015.
  2020 Grand Prix winner - ASSA ABLOY / Yale and GW+Co
  2020 Best Overall Visual Identity winner - Move United and Superunion
- For the Nordic countries, inaugural event held online. Launched in 2020.
  2020 Grand Prix winner - University Museum of Bergen and Haltenbanken
- For Australia and New Zealand, inaugural event held online. Launched in 2020.
  2020 Grand Prix winner - West Coast Council and For the People
  2020 Best Overall Visual Identity winner - Australian National Maritime Museum and Frost*collective
- For India. Launched in 2021
