= Libby, Perszyk, Kathman Inc. =

LPK
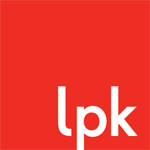
- Industry: Brand & Innovation Consultancy
- Founded: 1983
- Headquarters: Cincinnati, Ohio, United States
- Number of locations: Cincinnati
- Key people: Emily Flannery, Nathan Hendricks, Caroline Dunn.
- Products: Branding, Experience Design and Innovation
- Website: www.lpk.com

LPK (formerly known as Libby, Perszyk, Kathman Inc.) is an American brand design and innovation agency headquartered in Cincinnati, Ohio.

== History ==
LPK’s origins trace back to 1919, when Cliff Schaten started an art studio called C.H. Schaten Studios upon his return to Cincinnati after World War One. In 1959, seven of its employees purchased the company, renaming it Studio Art Associates. During the 1960s and 1970s, the company, which had been renamed Cato Johnson, opened offices in London, Brussels, Geneva, Paris, New York and Toronto. In 1975, Cato Johnson was acquired by advertising firm Young & Rubicam (Y&R), which continued to expand with locations in San Francisco, Hong Kong, São Paulo and Mexico City. In 1983, five Y&R employees—Mort Libby, Ray Perszyk, Jerry Kathman, Howard McIlvain and Jim Gabel—organized a leveraged buyout of the Cincinnati office and renamed the firm Libby, Perszyk, Kathman.^{[3]}

Since at least 1992, LPK's headquarters was the historic Doctors' Building in downtown Cincinnati. By 2024, they were the fourth-largest marketing firm in the city. LPK sold the Doctors' Building to developer Ashley Builders Group for $3.7 million on January 11 of that year. LPK occupied 53,000 square feet of space within the building at the time of the sale, but intended to significantly reduce their physical presence due to an increase in remote work.

== Leadership ==
From LPK’s founding in 1983 until 1997, the late Mort Libby was Chief Executive Officer, followed by Jerry Kathman, who was CEO from 1997 until 2016. In 2015, Executive leadership included Chief Executive Officer Jerry Kathman,^{[6]} Chief Creative Officer Nathan Hendricks, Global Development Officer John Recker, Chief Organizational Officer Phil Best and Chief Financial Officer Dennis Geiger.

In July 2016, the company announced the appointment of LPK’s next generation of chief officers: Chief Executive Officer Sarah Tomes, Chief Financial Officer Brent McCoy and Chief Growth Officer (previously Chief Insight & Innovation Officer), Valerie Jacobs. They joined Chief Creative Officer, Nathan Hendricks. Jerry Kathman then was Chairman at LPK.

In mid 2024, Sarah Tomes was the sole member of the board for LPK Holdings, while Sarah, Nathan Hendricks, Brent McCoy, Valerie Jacobs, and Maura Schilling were the members of the board of the LPK Brands entity.

At the end of 2024, the company was sold to Revitalize Capital, a Cincinnati area private equity firm, for an undisclosed sum.

== Clients ==
Clients have included Bayer, Coleman, Expedia, US Bank, P&G, Kellogg’s, Mondelẽz, SUNY and others.

== Awards ==
- Transform Awards North America 2019-Best visual identity from the FMCG sector: Silver- The Mad Optimist
- Transform Awards North America 2019-Best visual identity from the financial services sector: Highly commended- Greater Cincinnati Foundation
- Transform Awards North America 2019-Best brand evolution: Highly commended- The J.M. Smucker Company
- Red Dot Award 2013: Coleman Adjustable Comfort Sleeping Bag^{[10]}
- Global ACE Awards 2014: Sealed Air
- Pentaward 2011: Maker’s 46
