= Oakley, Cincinnati =

Oakley
- Neighborhood of Cincinnati
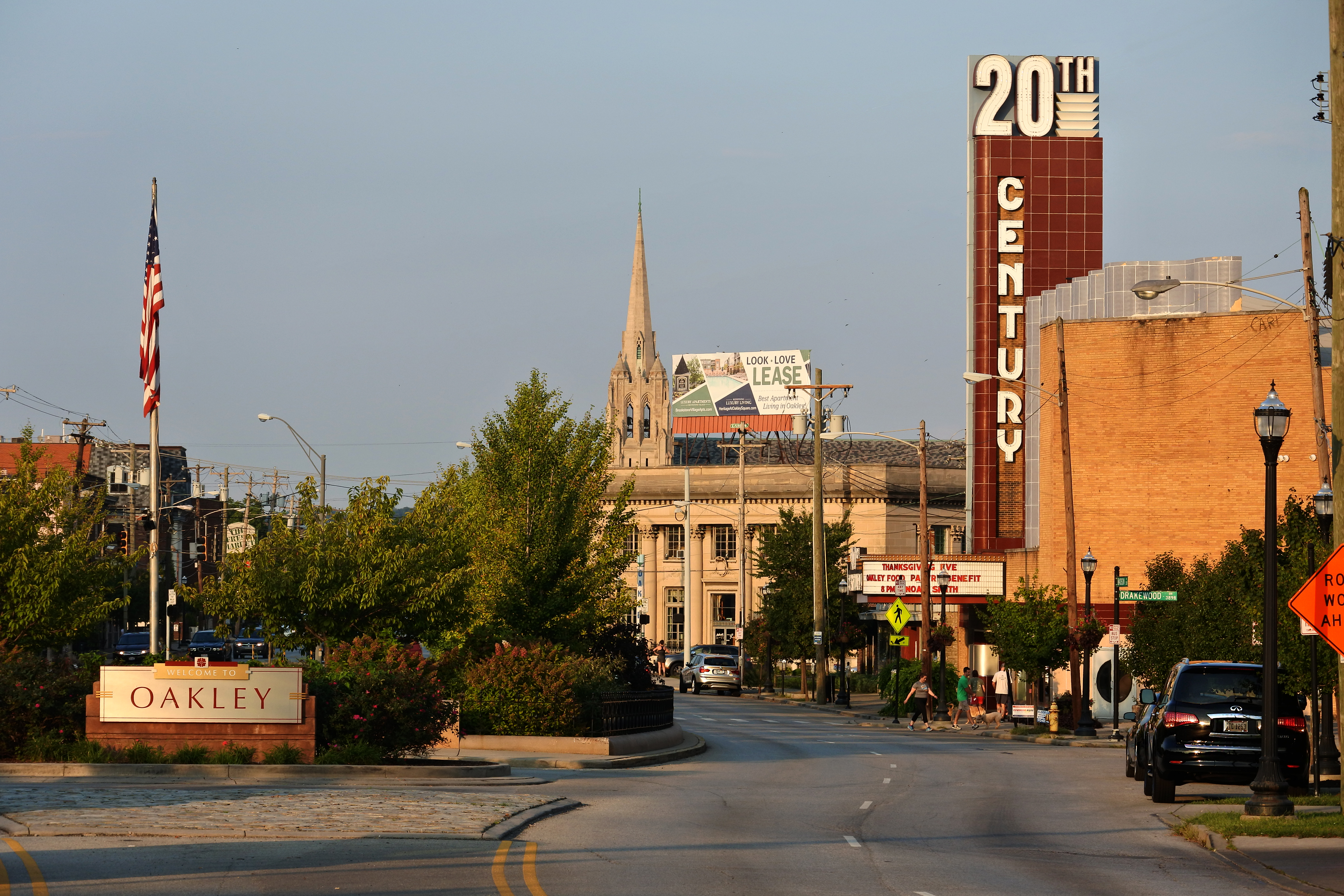
- Oakley Square

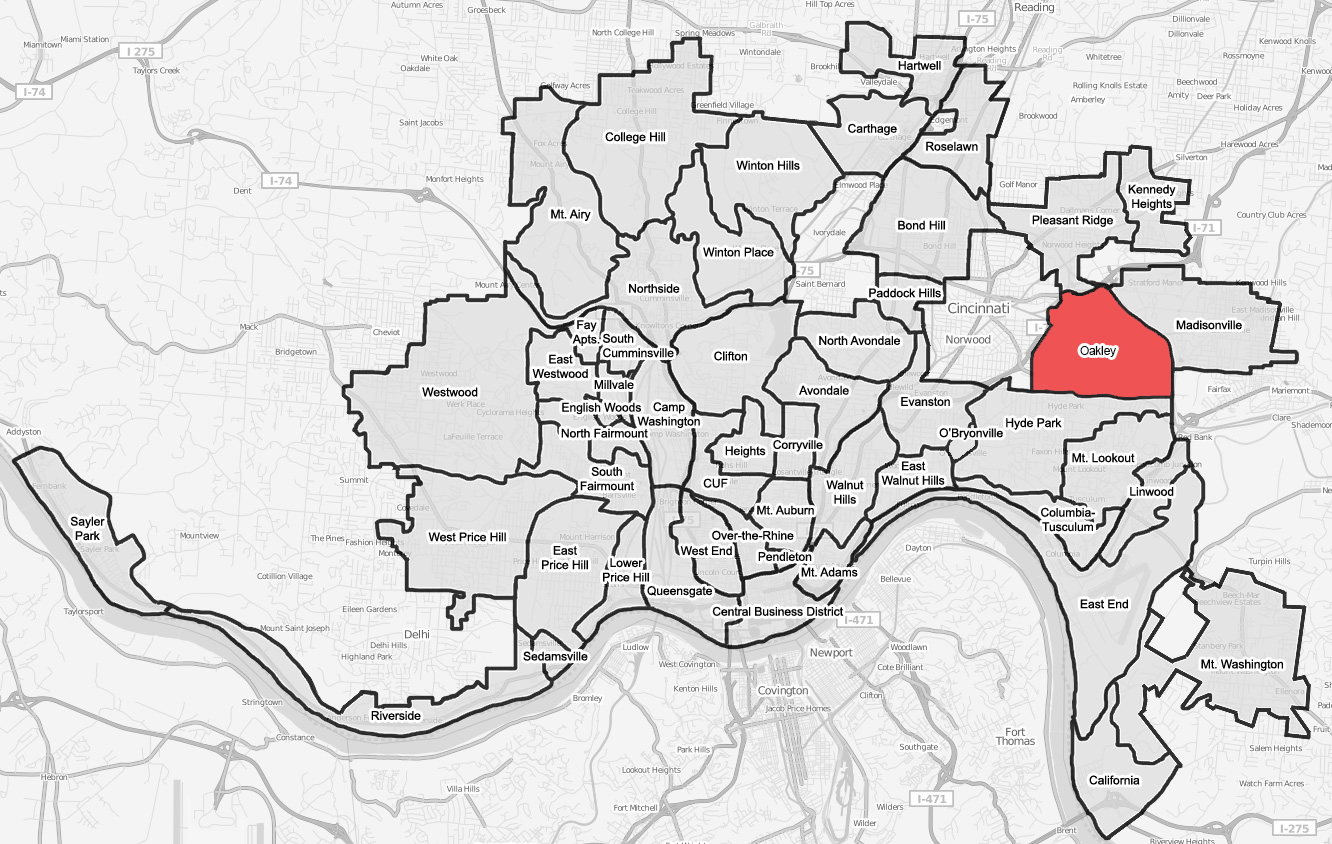
- Location within Cincinnati
- Coordinates: 39.151183°N 84.433245°W
- Country: United States
- State: Ohio
- County: Hamilton
- City: Cincinnati
- Elevation: 600 ft (182.8 m)

Population (2020)
  - Total: 11,761
- Time zone: UTC-5 (EST)
  - Summer (DST): UTC-4 (EDT)
- ZIP code: 45209

Oakley is one of the 52 neighborhoods of Cincinnati, Ohio. Located in the eastern part of the city, it borders Pleasant Ridge, Madisonville, and Hyde Park. Oakley is a primary thoroughfare and a major crosstown artery in Cincinnati, and contains multiple shopping centers. The population was 11,761 at the 2020 census.

== History ==
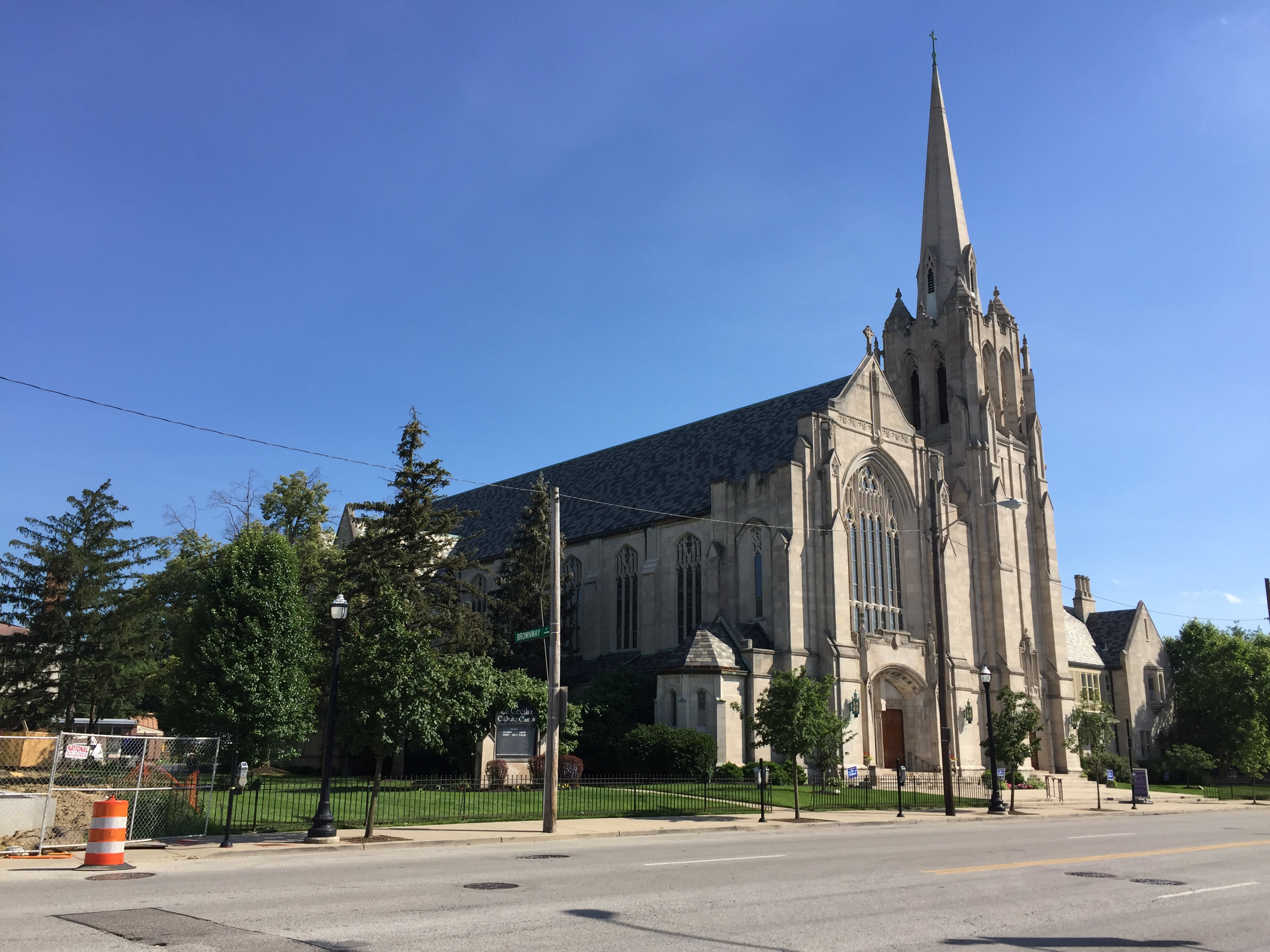
St. Cecila Catholic Church in 2019

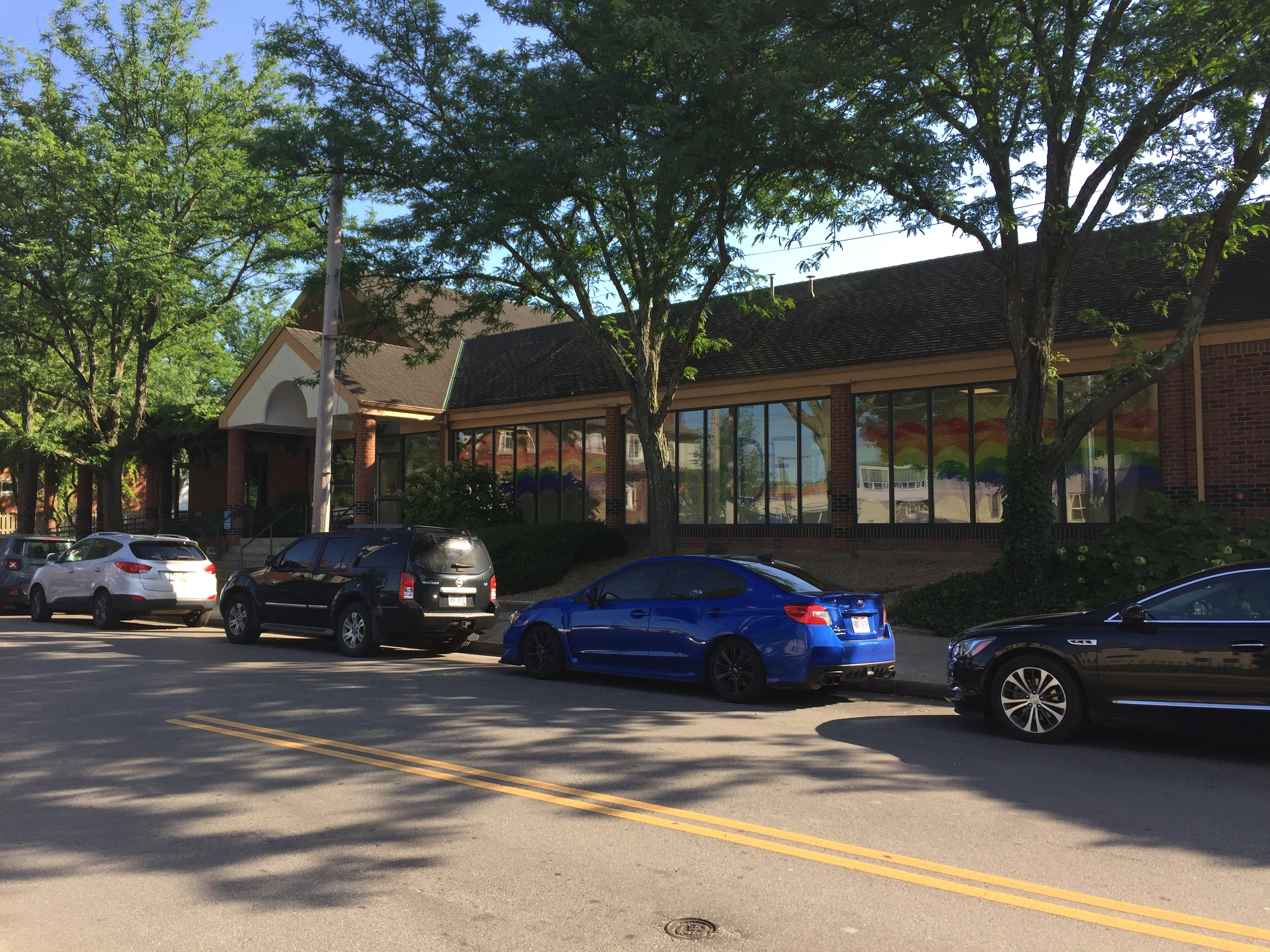
Oakley Branch of the Public Library of Cincinnati and Hamilton County

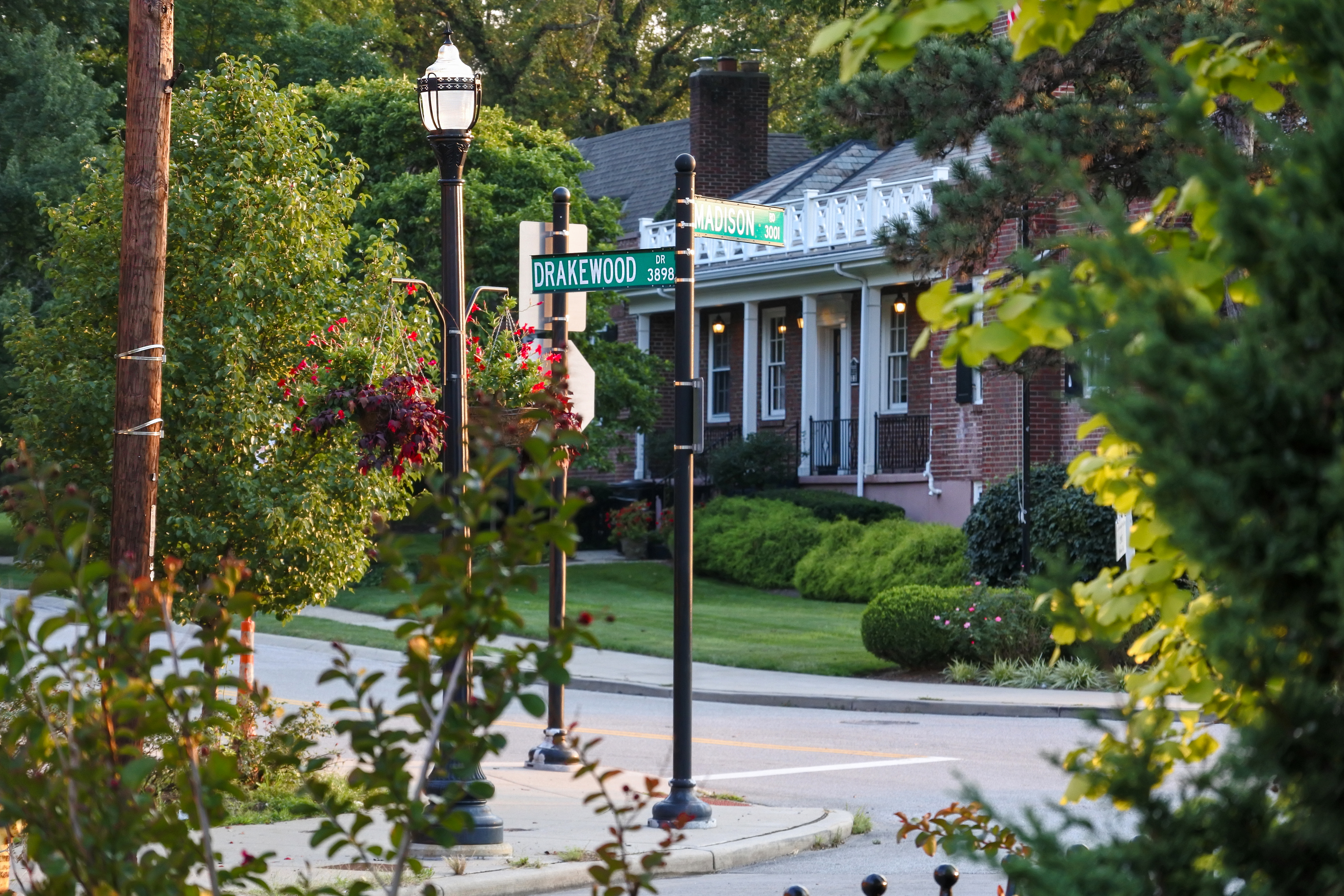
Typical residential street in the Oakley neighborhood

=== Agricultural origins ===
Originally known as Four Mile, the community of Oakley was first established in 1852 when John Schrimper opened a roadhouse known as "The Four Mile House". The place was named for its approximate location four miles from Cincinnati via the Madisonville Turnpike (present-day Madison Road). Four Mile continued to primarily serve as a stop for wagon traffic until the arrival of the Marietta and Cincinnati Railroad in 1866, which brought passenger rail service to the community. Due to the decreased importance of turnpike traffic, the community moved away from the name of Four Mile and renamed itself as "Oakley on East Walnut Hills" or simply "Oakley", with the latter name being registered in 1869. The name's origin is contested, with one theory suggesting the name alludes to the area's oak trees, and another theory asserting the name memorializes Reverend Maurice Oakley, an early president of Xavier University.

Oakley experienced small amounts of growth in the 1880s and 1890s, becoming a local recreational hub. A major aspect of the community's economy in the late nineteenth century centered around horseracing, with the Oakley Park Race Track opening in 1889. Throughout the 1890s, the track garnered a reputation as a center for organized gambling, and closed in 1904 after gambling was criminalized in Ohio. Despite the decline of the local horseracing industry, the growth allowed Oakley to incorporate as a village in 1898.

=== Industrial growth ===
The community transitioned into an industrial community in the early twentieth century. Its location along the former Marietta and Cincinnati Railroad provided easy access to the rest of the Cincinnati area. Furthermore, the village government gave ordinances to local utility companies to install gas, telegraphs, and streetcars, thus providing infrastructure for new industries. As a result, the Cincinnati Milling Machine Company, often referred to as “the Mill,” moved to Oakley in 1907 after purchasing over one hundred acres of land in the northern part of the village. Other businesses soon followed the Mill in relocating to the factory colony in northern Oakley. These industrialists pushed for annexation by the city of Cincinnati, citing a need for better fire and police services. After a successful vote for annexation in November 1911, Oakley was annexed by Cincinnati in 1913.

The Mill continued to shape Oakley's economy throughout the twentieth century. Its factory colony experienced significant growth after the American entrance into World War I due to the increased demand for machine tools to make military equipment, causing the neighborhood to undergo a housing boom in the late 1910s. Likewise, when the machine tooling industry contracted during the Interwar Period and the Great Depression, Oakley's growth slowed. After World War II, the Mill transitioned to producing plastics and computers. The company began to utilize more automated machines in its work, reducing its workforce. Due to these changes in the mid-twentieth century, the company renamed itself to Cincinnati Milacron in 1970.

The mid-twentieth century also saw Oakley experience multiple controversies surrounding racial segregation. As a result of redlining, block busting, and other discriminatory housing practices, Cincinnati's cityscape became highly segregated, with Oakley remaining a predominately white neighborhood while other nearby neighborhoods became majority black. In 1963, the Cincinnati Board of Education moved black students from nearby overcrowded elementary schools into the mostly white Oakley Elementary School, but kept the classes separate, thus maintaining racial segregation. In response, the local NAACP branch successfully sued for integration. In the 1970s, an Oakley mortgage company denied a loan to a mixed-race couple on account of their race. The couple successfully sued the company, with the United States District Court expanding the definitions of the Fair Housing Act to include racial steering.

=== Deindustrialization ===
In the late twentieth century, suburbanization and deindustrialization contributed to a population and economic downturn throughout Cincinnati. Oakley was impacted as well, with the neighborhood experiencing a population decline beginning in the 1970s. Decreased housing prices, coupled with Oakley's proximity to the wealthy neighborhood of Hyde Park, resulted in an influx of middle-class residents into the southern part of Oakley in the 1990s. Meanwhile, the Mill continued to shrink its operations throughout the late twentieth century and eventually closed in 2002, leaving the northern part of the neighborhood blighted. Vandercar Holdings, a real estate company, bought much of the land in northern Oakley with a plan to develop the area with low-density retail. Despite a battle in the Cincinnati Planning Commission between neighborhood representatives and Vandercar, the latter's plan was approved in 2002. As a result, the former Mill site in northern Oakley was developed by Vandercar into Oakley Station, a suburban-style retail center.

== Demographics ==
Population of Oakley 1900-2020
Year	Pop.	±%
1900	1,791	—
1910	4,438	+147.8%
1920	10,150	+128.7%
1930	13,211	+30.2%
1940	13,794	+4.4%
1950	15,504	+12.4%
1960	15,052	−2.9%
1970	14,781	−1.8%
1980	12,801	−13.4%
1990	12,351	−3.5%
2000	11,244	−9.0%
2010	10,308	−8.3%
2020	11,761	+14.1%

As of the census of 2020, there were 11,761 people living in the neighborhood. There were 7,456 housing units. The racial makeup of the neighborhood was 82.0% White, 7.4% Black or African American, 0.2% Native American, 3.8% Asian, 0.0% Pacific Islander, 1.2% from some other race, and 5.5% from two or more races. 3.6% of the population were Hispanic or Latino of any race.

There were 6,561 households, out of which 33.2% were families. 52.3% of all households were made up of individuals.

11.2% of the neighborhood's population were under the age of 18, 76.0% were 18 to 64, and 12.8% were 65 years of age or older. 47.8% of the population were male and 52.2% were female.

According to the U.S. Census American Community Survey, for the period 2016-2020 the estimated median annual income for a household in the neighborhood was $76,568. About 1.5% of family households were living below the poverty line. About 70.5% of adults had a bachelor's degree or higher.

== Economy ==
Oakley's business district, Oakley Square, lies along Madison Road. In addition to Oakley Square, Oakley contains two shopping centers. Hyde Park Plaza on the southern edge of the neighborhood is named for the neighborhood to the south, Hyde Park. The Center of Cincinnati on the north edge is part of continuing development on the south side of the I-71/Norwood Lateral/Ridge Road interchange. Both of these centers are urban infill and car oriented, located on the edge of Oakley and designed to serve multiple neighborhoods. Oakley Square, by contrast, is located in the center of Oakley along several bus routes, making it more pedestrian and transit oriented.

== Culture ==
The neighborhood hosts Oakley After Hours, a monthly street festival, each month May through October.
