= National Register of Historic Places listings in eastern Cincinnati =

This is a list of the National Register of Historic Places listings in eastern Cincinnati, Ohio.

This is intended to be a complete list of the properties and districts on the National Register of Historic Places in eastern Cincinnati, Ohio, United States. Eastern Cincinnati is defined as being all of the city outside of downtown and east of Vine Street. The locations of National Register properties and districts may be seen in an online map.

There are 297 properties and districts listed on the National Register in Cincinnati, including 12 National Historic Landmarks. Eastern Cincinnati includes 137 of these properties and districts, including 4 National Historic Landmarks; the city's remaining properties and districts are listed elsewhere. Another property in eastern Cincinnati was once listed but has been removed.

This National Park Service list is complete through NPS recent listings posted August 28, 2026.

== Current listings ==
	Name on the Register	Image	Date listed	Location	Description
1	The Alameda Flats	The Alameda Flats	June 4, 2014 (#14000293)	3580-3586 Reading Rd. 39°08′50″N 84°29′20″W	
2	The Alexandra	The Alexandra	October 17, 1997 (#97001223)	921 E. William H. Taft Rd. 39°07′37″N 84°29′21″W	
3	Alms and Doepke Dry Goods Company	Alms and Doepke Dry Goods Company	March 3, 1980 (#80003035)	222 E. Central Parkway; 39°06′29″N 84°30′37″W	
4	The Ambassador	The Ambassador	June 30, 2014 (#14000356)	722-724 Gholson Ave. 39°08′57″N 84°29′21″W	
5	John S. Baker House	John S. Baker House	June 6, 1979 (#79001852)	1887 Madison Rd. 39°07′45″N 84°28′04″W	
6	Baldwin Piano Company Building	Baldwin Piano Company Building	February 23, 2016 (#16000043)	655 Eden Park Dr. 39°07′00″N 84°29′53″W	
7	Bates Building	Bates Building	August 24, 1979 (#79002700)	3819 Eastern Ave. 39°06′40″N 84°26′08″W	
8	Bauer Apartments	Bauer Apartments	December 2, 1982 (#82001465)	2015-2017 Madison Rd. 39°07′55″N 84°27′44″W	
9	August Bepler House	August Bepler House	April 13, 1977 (#77001062)	805 Tusculum Ave. 39°06′59″N 84°25′31″W	
10	Bernheim House	Bernheim House	March 29, 1983 (#83001977)	195 Greenhills Rd. 39°07′55″N 84°26′35″W	
11	Bon Air Flats	Bon Air Flats	September 1, 2015 (#15000562)	615 Maple Ave. 39°08′31″N 84°29′37″W	
12	Ayres L. Bramble House	Ayres L. Bramble House	April 1, 1982 (#82003576)	4416 Homer Ave. 39°09′06″N 84°23′18″W	
13	A. E. Burckhardt House	A. E. Burckhardt House	March 3, 1980 (#80003038)	400 Forest Ave. 39°08′47″N 84°29′58″W	Demolished in October 2022.
14	Samuel Burdsal House	Samuel Burdsal House	June 10, 1982 (#82003577)	1342 Broadway St. 39°06′40″N 84°30′30″W	
15	C. H. Burroughs House	C. H. Burroughs House	March 3, 1980 (#80003039)	1010 Chapel St. 39°07′52″N 84°29′15″W	
16	Cincinnati Hebrew Day School		May 28, 2025 (#100011930)	7855 Dawn Road; 39°12′24″N 84°27′40″W	
17	Cincinnati Observatory Building	Cincinnati Observatory Building	March 3, 1980 (#80003043)	Observatory Pl. 39°08′21″N 84°25′21″W	
18	Cincinnati Tennis Club	Cincinnati Tennis Club	March 29, 1983 (#83001979)	Dexter and Wold Aves. 39°08′03″N 84°28′10″W	
19	Cincinnati Zoo Historic Structures	Cincinnati Zoo Historic Structures	February 27, 1987 (#87000905)	3400 Vine St. 39°08′39″N 84°30′31″W	
20	Clauder's Pharmacy	Clauder's Pharmacy	August 24, 1979 (#79002696)	4026 Eastern Ave. 39°06′31″N 84°25′56″W	Demolished
21	Coca-Cola Bottling Corporation	Coca-Cola Bottling Corporation	July 2, 1987 (#87000985)	1507 Dana Ave. 39°08′46″N 84°28′42″W	
22	Columbia Baptist Cemetery	Columbia Baptist Cemetery	August 24, 1979 (#79002709)	Northern side of Wilmer Rd. 39°06′22″N 84°25′45″W	
23	Jacob D. Cox House	Jacob D. Cox House	April 14, 1975 (#75001416)	241-243 Gilman Ave. 39°07′19″N 84°30′19″W	
24	The Crescent	The Crescent	June 20, 2014 (#14000336)	3719 Reading Road; 39°09′04″N 84°29′14″W	
25	Cummins School	Cummins School	January 9, 1986 (#86000014)	824 William H. Taft Rd. 39°07′40″N 84°29′27″W	
26	Stephen Decker Rowhouse	Stephen Decker Rowhouse	August 24, 1979 (#79002693)	531-541 Tusculum Ave. 39°06′56″N 84°26′00″W	
27	A. M. Detmer House	A. M. Detmer House	March 3, 1980 (#80003046)	1520 Chapel St. 39°07′51″N 84°28′48″W	
28	East Walnut Hills Firehouse	East Walnut Hills Firehouse	February 17, 1983 (#83001980)	Madison Rd. and Hackberry St. 39°07′48″N 84°28′28″W	
29	Eastern Hills Young Men's Christian Association (YMCA)	Eastern Hills Young Men's Christian Association (YMCA)	December 13, 2016 (#16000847)	1228 E. McMillan St. 39°07′32″N 84°29′00″W	
30	Eastwood Historic District	Eastwood Historic District	February 25, 2005 (#05000093)	Roughly along Eastwood, Collinwood, Overbrook, Madison and Duck Creek Rds. 39°09′48″N 84°24′39″W	
31	Eckert Building	Eckert Building	September 29, 1983 (#83001981)	2600 Woodburn Ave. 39°07′38″N 84°28′42″W	
32	Eden Park Stand Pipe	Eden Park Stand Pipe	March 3, 1980 (#80003048)	Eden Park Dr. 39°07′02″N 84°29′25″W	
33	Eden Park Station No. 7	Eden Park Station No. 7	March 3, 1980 (#80003049)	1430 Martin Dr. 39°06′47″N 84°29′28″W	
34	Edgecliff	Edgecliff	March 3, 1980 (#80003050)	2220 Victory Parkway; 39°07′18″N 84°29′02″W	Demolished
35	Edgecliff Area Historic Group	Edgecliff Area Historic Group	November 11, 1977 (#77001063)	2220 Victory Parkway; 39°07′16″N 84°29′02″W	
36	Elsinore Arch	Elsinore Arch	March 3, 1980 (#80003052)	1700 Gilbert Ave. 39°06′47″N 84°29′59″W	
37	Evanston Historic District		June 23, 2022 (#100007811)	Montgomery Rd. between Brewster and Rutland Aves. 39°08′41″N 84°28′10″W	
38	Walter Field House	Walter Field House	March 3, 1980 (#80003053)	3725 Reading Rd. 39°09′05″N 84°29′11″W	Shingle Style residence built for businessman; now apartments
39	First Congregational-Unitarian Church	First Congregational-Unitarian Church	May 28, 1976 (#76001434)	2901 Reading Rd. 39°07′55″N 84°29′53″W	
40	First Universalist Church	First Universalist Church	March 3, 1980 (#80003055)	2600 Essex Pl. 39°07′40″N 84°29′55″W	
41	Ford Motor Company Cincinnati Plant	Ford Motor Company Cincinnati Plant	May 25, 1989 (#89000460)	660 Lincoln Ave. 39°07′58″N 84°29′36″W	
42	Madam Fredin's Eden Park School and Neighboring Row House	Madam Fredin's Eden Park School and Neighboring Row House	November 29, 1979 (#79001858)	938-946 Morris St. and 922-932 Morris St. 39°07′07″N 84°29′40″W	
43	Fulton-Presbyterian Cemetery	Fulton-Presbyterian Cemetery	August 24, 1979 (#79002706)	Carrel St. 39°06′24″N 84°25′59″W	
44	General Hospital Nurses' Home	General Hospital Nurses' Home	June 10, 2005 (#05000581)	311 Albert Sabin Way; 39°08′20″N 84°30′09″W	
45	Stephen A. Gerrard Mansion	Stephen A. Gerrard Mansion	November 5, 1987 (#87001940)	748 Betula Ave. 39°09′39″N 84°29′09″W	
46	Gilbert Row	Gilbert Row	May 13, 1982 (#82003579)	2152-2166 Gilbert Ave. 39°07′12″N 84°29′39″W	
47	Gilbert-Sinton Historic District	Gilbert-Sinton Historic District	October 6, 1983 (#83004306)	Roughly bounded by Morris, Gilbert and Sinton Aves. 39°07′09″N 84°29′37″W	
48	Glencoe-Auburn Hotel and Glencoe-Auburn Place Row Houses	Glencoe-Auburn Hotel and Glencoe-Auburn Place Row Houses	December 10, 2003 (#03001286)	Glencoe Place, Leroy Court, View Court; 39°07′22″N 84°30′37″W	
49	Grace Church	Grace Church	September 16, 1982 (#82003581)	3626 Reading Rd. 39°08′53″N 84°29′14″W	Now known as St. Michael and All Angels Episcopal Church
50	Gruen Watch Company-Time Hill	Gruen Watch Company-Time Hill	February 29, 1996 (#96000219)	401 E. McMillan St. 39°07′33″N 84°30′06″W	
51	Haddon Hall	Haddon Hall	July 22, 1982 (#82003582)	3418 Reading Rd. 39°08′30″N 84°29′32″W	
52	Edward Hart House		March 13, 2023 (#100008694)	818 Glenwood Ave. 39°08′52″N 84°29′18″W	
53	Hauck-Heine House		February 5, 2026 (#100012690)	506 Oak Street; 39°07′51″N 84°29′59″W	
54	George Hoadley Jr. House	George Hoadley Jr. House	March 9, 1990 (#90000380)	2337 Grandin Rd. 39°07′41″N 84°27′10″W	
55	Holy Cross Monastery and Chapel	Holy Cross Monastery and Chapel	September 13, 1978 (#78002078)	1055 St. Paul Pl. 39°06′27″N 84°29′57″W	
56	Hoodin Building	Hoodin Building	August 24, 1979 (#79002708)	3719-3725 Eastern Ave. 39°06′41″N 84°26′09″W	
57	Houston House	Houston House	August 24, 1979 (#79002704)	3708 Mead Ave. 39°06′46″N 84°26′18″W	
58	Hyde Park Methodist Episcopal Church	Hyde Park Methodist Episcopal Church	January 7, 2009 (#08001294)	1345 Grace Ave. 39°08′12″N 84°25′56″W	
59	Ida Street Viaduct	Ida Street Viaduct	November 28, 1980 (#80003060)	Ida St. between Monastery and Paradrome Sts. 39°06′32″N 84°29′57″W	
60	Immaculate Conception Church, School, and Rectory	Immaculate Conception Church, School, and Rectory	December 29, 1978 (#78002079)	Pavilion and Guido Sts. 39°06′26″N 84°29′46″W	
61	Kellogg House	Kellogg House	August 24, 1979 (#79002702)	3807 Eastern Ave. 39°06′41″N 84°26′09″W	
62	Kerper and Melbourne Terrace Apartments		July 19, 2024 (#100010530)	3066–3092 Kerper Avenue and 3066–3084 Melbourne Terrace; 39°08′14″N 84°29′12″W	
63	King Records Studio Buildings	King Records Studio Buildings	September 6, 2022 (#100008067)	1536-1540 Brewster Ave. 39°08′39″N 84°28′35″W	
64	Kestler Building	Kestler Building	August 24, 1979 (#79002695)	4024 Eastern Ave. 39°06′31″N 84°25′56″W	
65	The Kinsey	The Kinsey	December 18, 2013 (#13000937)	2415 Maplewood Ave. 39°07′31″N 84°30′18″W	
66	Theodore Krumberg Building	Theodore Krumberg Building	December 17, 1982 (#82001467)	1201 Main St. 39°06′32″N 84°30′42″W	
67	La Tosca Flats	La Tosca Flats	February 5, 1999 (#99000096)	2700 Observatory Ave. 39°08′17″N 84°26′33″W	
68	La Ventura Apartments		March 18, 2024 (#100010054)	700 Chalfonte Place; 39°09′01″N 84°29′24″W	
69	Landt Building	Landt Building	August 24, 1979 (#79002703)	3815-3817 Eastern Ave. 39°06′41″N 84°26′08″W	
70	Langdon House	Langdon House	April 16, 1969 (#69000143)	3626 Eastern Ave. 39°06′49″N 84°26′14″W	
71	Harry Milton Levy House	Harry Milton Levy House	January 30, 1998 (#98000040)	2383 Observatory Ave. 39°08′17″N 84°27′17″W	
72	Lillybanks	Lillybanks	July 7, 1983 (#83001982)	2386 Grandin Rd. 39°07′40″N 84°26′59″W	
73	LuNeack House	LuNeack House	August 24, 1979 (#79002705)	3718 Mead Ave. 39°06′45″N 84°26′18″W	
74	Frederick Lunkenheimer House	Frederick Lunkenheimer House	August 8, 1985 (#85001690)	2133 Luray; 39°07′07″N 84°29′18″W	
75	Madison and Woodburn Historic District	Madison and Woodburn Historic District	June 30, 1983 (#83001983)	Woodburn Ave. and Madison Rd. 39°07′45″N 84°28′36″W	
76	Madison-Stewart Historic District	Madison-Stewart Historic District	May 29, 1975 (#75001419)	Junction of Madison and Stewart Sts. 39°09′36″N 84°23′53″W	
77	Manse Hotel and Manse Hotel Annex	Manse Hotel and Manse Hotel Annex	August 8, 2019 (#100004232)	916-926 and 1004 Chapel St. 39°07′53″N 84°29′12″W	
78	Mardot Antique Shop	Mardot Antique Shop	August 24, 1979 (#79002698)	3964 Eastern Ave. 39°06′32″N 84°25′57″W	
79	Martin House	Martin House	March 21, 1979 (#79001859)	6500 Beechmont Ave. 39°05′13″N 84°22′42″W	
80	David and Mary May House	David and Mary May House	August 22, 1996 (#96000931)	3723 Washington Ave. 39°09′07″N 84°29′40″W	
81	S.C. Mayer House	S.C. Mayer House	March 3, 1980 (#80003063)	1614 Main St. 39°06′47″N 84°30′44″W	
82	McKinley School	McKinley School	August 24, 1979 (#79002697)	3905 Eastern Ave. 39°06′35″N 84°26′03″W	
83	Mecklenburg's Garden	Mecklenburg's Garden	November 7, 1976 (#76001436)	302 E. University Ave. 39°07′57″N 84°30′10″W	
84	Mill & Dunn Historic District	Mill & Dunn Historic District	August 29, 2019 (#100004315)	100-139 Williams St., 119 Lock St., 200-328 Dunn St., 100-200 Mill St., and 209-327 Wyoming Ave. 39°13′26″N 84°27′10″W	
85	Mills' Row	Mills' Row	April 29, 1977 (#77001065)	2201-2209 Park Ave. 39°07′13″N 84°29′14″W	
86	Richard H. Mitchell House	Richard H. Mitchell House	March 3, 1980 (#80003065)	3 Burton Woods Lane; 39°09′24″N 84°29′14″W	
87	Bernard H. Moormann House	Bernard H. Moormann House	March 20, 1973 (#73001462)	1514 E. McMillan St. 39°07′31″N 84°28′38″W	
88	Mount Adams Public School	Mount Adams Public School	November 24, 1980 (#80003066)	1125 St. Gregory St. 39°06′31″N 84°29′53″W	
89	Mount Auburn Historic District	Mount Auburn Historic District	March 28, 1973 (#73001464)	Both sides of Auburn Ave. from Ringgold St. to Howard Taft Rd. 39°07′12″N 84°30′30″W	
90	Norwell Residence	Norwell Residence	August 24, 1979 (#79002707)	506 Tusculum Ave. 39°06′53″N 84°26′00″W	
91	Observatory Historic District	Observatory Historic District	September 20, 1978 (#78002080)	Observatory Pl. and Ave. 39°08′18″N 84°25′22″W	
92	Old St. Mary's Church, School and Rectory	Old St. Mary's Church, School and Rectory	March 13, 1976 (#76001439)	123 E. 13th St. 39°06′34″N 84°30′43″W	
93	Over-the-Rhine Historic District	Over-the-Rhine Historic District	May 17, 1983 (#83001985)	Roughly bounded by Dorsey, Sycamore, Liberty, Reading, Central Parkway, McMicken Ave., and Vine Sts.; also 308-322, 500-550 Reading Rd., 222 W. 12th St., and 1208, 1416-1430, 1544, 1600, 1628, and 1900 Central Parkway; 39°06′52″N 84°30′54″W	Extends into western Cincinnati. Second set of addresses represents a boundary increase of June 13, 2014.
94	Park Flats	Park Flats	September 8, 1983 (#83001986)	2378-2384 Park Ave. 39°07′32″N 84°29′10″W	
95	Peeble's Corner Historic District	Peeble's Corner Historic District	November 14, 1985 (#85002835)	Roughly E. McMillan St. and Gilbert Ave. 39°07′33″N 84°29′24″W	
96	George Hunt Pendleton House	George Hunt Pendleton House	October 15, 1966 (#66000611)	559 E. Liberty St. 39°06′43″N 84°30′16″W	
97	Peters-Kupferschmid House	Peters-Kupferschmid House	October 18, 1984 (#84000134)	2167 Grandin Rd. 39°07′50″N 84°27′31″W	Demolished
98	Pfleger Family Houses	Pfleger Family Houses	March 11, 1980 (#80003072)	216 and 218 Erkenbrecker Ave. 39°08′32″N 84°30′20″W	
99	Pilgrim Presbyterian Church	Pilgrim Presbyterian Church	July 18, 1980 (#80003074)	1222 Ida St. 39°06′36″N 84°29′56″W	
100	Ben Pitman House	Ben Pitman House	July 7, 1969 (#69000144)	1852 Columbia Parkway; 39°07′15″N 84°28′53″W	
101	Poinciana Flats	Poinciana Flats	June 5, 2014 (#14000294)	3522 Reading Rd. 39°08′43″N 84°29′24″W	
102	Police Station No. 6	Police Station No. 6	May 18, 1981 (#81000436)	Delta Ave. and Columbia Parkway; 39°07′02″N 84°26′23″W	
103	Henry Powell House	Henry Powell House	March 3, 1980 (#80003076)	2209 Auburn Ave. 39°07′20″N 84°30′31″W	
104	The President Apartments		August 21, 2026 (#100013319)	784 Greenwood Avenue; 39°09′07″N 84°29′10″W	
105	Procter and Collier-Beau Brummell Building	Procter and Collier-Beau Brummell Building	October 18, 1984 (#84002714)	440 E. McMillan St. 39°07′37″N 84°30′00″W	
106	Prospect Hill Historic District	Prospect Hill Historic District	September 4, 1980 (#80003078)	Roughly bounded by Liberty Hill, Highland, Pueblo, Channing, and Sycamore Sts. 39°06′48″N 84°30′23″W	
107	Ransley Apartment Building	Ransley Apartment Building	March 3, 1980 (#80003079)	2390 Kemper Lane; 39°07′32″N 84°29′16″W	
108	Bernard Ratterman House	Bernard Ratterman House	September 30, 1982 (#82003584)	1349 Broadway; 39°06′43″N 84°30′32″W	
109	Riverview House Apartments	Riverview House Apartments	June 20, 2023 (#100009044)	2538 Hackberry St. 39°07′34″N 84°28′31″W	
110	L.B. Robb Drugstore	L.B. Robb Drugstore	August 24, 1979 (#79002694)	4030 Eastern Ave. 39°06′30″N 84°25′55″W	Demolished
111	Rookwood Pottery	Rookwood Pottery	December 5, 1972 (#72001023)	Celestial and Rookwood Pl. 39°06′25″N 84°30′02″W	
112	St. Aloysius Orphanage	St. Aloysius Orphanage	September 27, 2012 (#12000835)	4721 Reading Rd. 39°10′17″N 84°28′09″W	
113	St. Francis De Sales Church Historic District	St. Francis De Sales Church Historic District	March 1, 1974 (#74001512)	Woodburn Ave. and Madison Rd. 39°07′48″N 84°28′36″W	
114	St. Mark's Church and Rectory		January 19, 2023 (#100008544)	3500 Montgomery Rd. 39°08′33″N 84°28′15″W	
115	St. Paul Church Historic District	St. Paul Church Historic District	January 18, 1974 (#74001513)	Spring, 12th, and Pendleton Sts. 39°06′34″N 84°30′25″W	
116	St. Rosa Church	St. Rosa Church	April 1, 1982 (#82003587)	2501 Eastern Ave. 39°07′25″N 84°27′42″W	
117	Robert F. Schulkers House		December 6, 2024 (#100011129)	3168 Victoria Avenue; 39°08′32″N 84°25′33″W	
118	The Somerset Apartments	The Somerset Apartments	June 30, 2014 (#14000355)	802-814 Blair Ave. 39°08′29″N 84°29′33″W	
119	The South Crescent Arms	The South Crescent Arms	August 26, 2021 (#100006851)	3700 Reading Rd. 39°09′03″N 84°29′11″W	
120	Spencer Town Hall	Spencer Town Hall	August 24, 1979 (#79002701)	3833 Eastern Ave. 39°06′39″N 84°26′06″W	
121	Stites House	Stites House	August 24, 1979 (#79002699)	315 Stites Ave. 39°06′41″N 84°26′05″W	
122	Capt. Stone House	Capt. Stone House	March 3, 1980 (#80003041)	405 Oak St. 39°07′51″N 84°30′05″W	
123	Harriet Beecher Stowe House	Harriet Beecher Stowe House	November 10, 1970 (#70000497)	2950 Gilbert Ave. 39°07′59″N 84°29′16″W	
124	Sycamore-13th Street Grouping	Sycamore-13th Street Grouping	June 1, 1982 (#82003588)	12th, 13th, and Sycamore Sts. 39°06′35″N 84°30′35″W	
125	William Howard Taft National Historic Site	William Howard Taft National Historic Site	October 15, 1966 (#66000612)	2038 Auburn Ave. 39°07′11″N 84°30′31″W	
126	Twentieth Century Theatre	Twentieth Century Theatre	August 26, 1993 (#93000879)	3023-3025 Madison Rd. 39°09′03″N 84°25′59″W	
127	United Colored American Cemetery		August 22, 2022 (#100008017)	4732-4734 Duck Creek Rd. (at corner of 4805 Duck Creek Rd.); 39°09′55″N 84°24′51″W	
128	Verona Apartments	Verona Apartments	July 2, 2008 (#08000625)	2356 Park Ave. 39°07′28″N 84°29′11″W	
129	Charlton Wallace House	Charlton Wallace House	January 30, 1976 (#76001441)	2563 Hackberry St. 39°07′37″N 84°28′36″W	
130	Walnut Hills United Presbyterian Church	Walnut Hills United Presbyterian Church	March 3, 1980 (#80003089)	2601 Gilbert Ave. 39°07′40″N 84°29′23″W	
131	John Henry Weston House	John Henry Weston House	March 20, 2002 (#02000218)	1321 Michigan Ave. 39°08′10″N 84°26′33″W	
132	Wilson-Gibson House	Wilson-Gibson House	March 17, 1976 (#76001444)	425 Oak St. 39°07′49″N 84°30′01″W	
133	Windsor Public School	Windsor Public School	March 10, 2015 (#15000095)	937 Windsor St. 39°07′20″N 84°29′24″W	
134	Isaac M. Wise Temple-Center	Isaac M. Wise Temple-Center	March 15, 2019 (#100003527)	3771 Reading Rd. 39°09′08″N 84°29′07″W	
135	Withrow High School	Withrow High School	January 19, 1983 (#83001987)	2488 Madison Rd. 39°08′29″N 84°27′07″W	
136	Mary A. Wolfe House	Mary A. Wolfe House	March 3, 1980 (#80003092)	965 Burton Ave. 39°08′59″N 84°29′01″W	Demolished in 2019.
137	Gorham A. Worth House	Gorham A. Worth House	April 11, 1973 (#73001472)	2316 Auburncrest Ave. 39°07′25″N 84°30′23″W	

== Former listing ==
	Name on the Register	Image	Date listed	Date removed	Location	Description
1	Cincinnati Zoo District	Cincinnati Zoo District	January 27, 1975 (#75001415)	Unknown	Cincinnati Zoological Gardens; 39°08′36″N 84°30′28″W	Listing of four buildings. Two were demolished, two were transferred to the Cincinnati Zoo Historic Structures listing in 1987.

== See also ==
- List of National Historic Landmarks in Ohio
- National Register of Historic Places listings in Cincinnati, Ohio

== Notes ==
a: Stated more precisely, this list includes the portions of the city located east of a line running along Interstate 471 from the Ohio River to Interstate 71, north to Central Parkway, west to Vine Street, and north to the city's northern edge.
