= Pfleger (surname) =

Pfleger is a surname of German origin. People with that name include:

- Augustin Pfleger (1635 – at least 1686), German composer of Bohemian birth
- Helmut Pfleger (born 1943), German chess Grandmaster and author
- Michael Pfleger (born 1949), U.S. Roman Catholic priest and social activist

== See also ==
- Pfleger, a mediaeval office holder in the Holy Roman Empire
- Pfleger Family Houses, a pair of historic homes in Cincinnati, Ohio
