= Mills' Row =

Historic house in Ohio, United States

- U.S. National Register of Historic Places
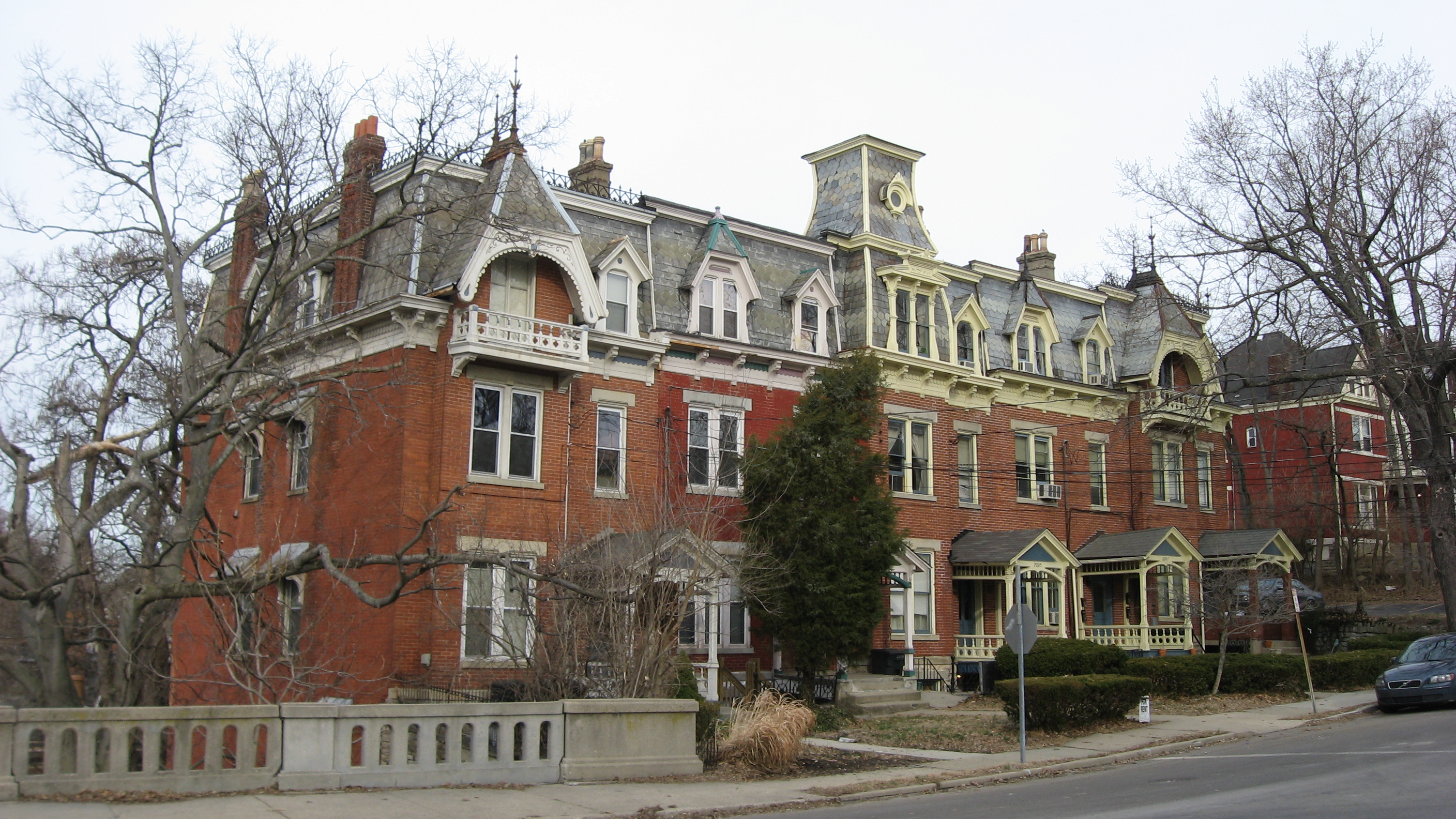
- Front of Mills' Row in 2011

- Location within Ohio Location within the United States
- Location: 2201–9 Park Ave. Cincinnati
- Coordinates: 39°7′12.62″N 84°29′12.53″W
- Built by: Joseph F. Mills
- Architectural style: Second Empire
- NRHP reference No.: 77001065
- Added to NRHP: 29 April 1977

Mills' Row is historic building in Cincinnati, Ohio.

== Description and history ==
The large brick building has a rectangular base plan. Located in Lot Number 1 of Joseph Mills' subdivision it is thought he designed and built it. This row house with its mansard roofs and center tower asymmetrically placed is an excellent example of Second Empire architecture in a multi-family building, rare in Cincinnati. The address is 2201–9 Park Avenue. It was listed in the National Register of Historic Places on April 29, 1977.

== See also ==
- Historic preservation
- History of Cincinnati
- National Register of Historic Places listings in eastern Cincinnati
