= Coca-Cola Bottling Plant (Cincinnati, Ohio) =

- Coca-Cola Bottling Corporation
- U.S. National Register of Historic Places
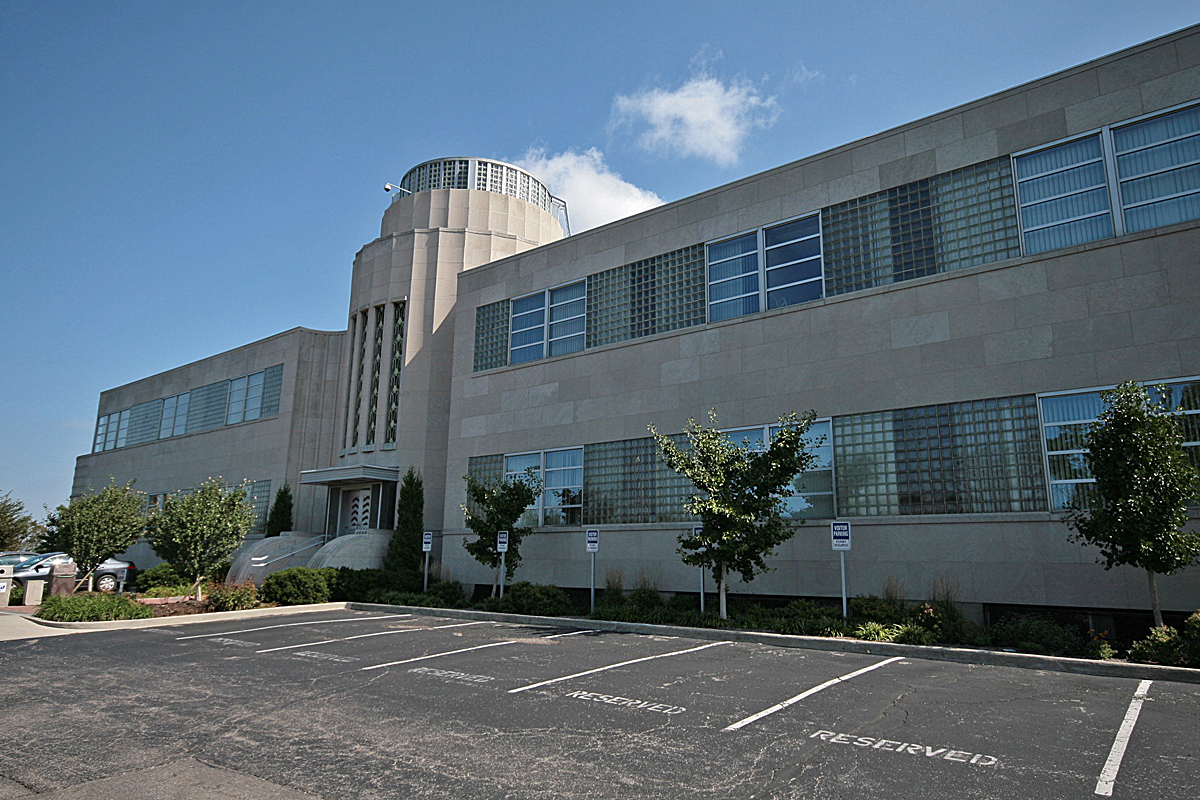
- Front of the building
- Interactive map of the property
- Location: 1507 Dana Ave., Cincinnati, Ohio
- Coordinates: 39°8′46″N 84°28′38″W
- Area: 6.9 acres (2.8 ha)
- Built: 1938
- Architect: John Henri Deekin
- Architectural style: Streamline Moderne
- NRHP reference No.: 87000985
- Added to NRHP: July 2, 1987

The Coca-Cola Bottling Plant is a historic manufacturing facility in the Evanston neighborhood of Cincinnati, Ohio. Constructed in the 1930s in high Streamline Moderne style, it no longer produces beverages, but has been named a historic site.

Around 2001, Xavier University purchased the building and converted it into the Alumni Center, a building holding the Xavier University National Alumni Association, Community Building Institute, Human Resources, Physical Plant department, and Office of University Communications.

== Bottling plant ==
The Coca-Cola Company ordered construction of the present building in the Evanston neighborhood during the Great Depression, It was completed in 1938. The designer was John H. Deekin, a Cincinnati architect. It is one of his most significant surviving structures. The plant was built largely of Indiana Limestone with substantial amounts of glass block, and smaller amounts of metal are also present. Although the facade is two stories tall, the main manufacturing section is just one story; a basement underlies much of the building. Some of the architecture, including the little-changed lobby, employs Art Deco details. In conjunction with the general Streamline Moderne appearance, the Art Deco features emphasize a sense of modernism with few parallels in the Cincinnati area, especially because the style's application to an industrial facility was unusual. The company promoted its use of highly mechanized production equipment at this facility; its ability to produce 500 bottles each minute was highly touted.

== Post-bottling ==
Coca-Cola no longer employs the building for beverage production. It was later converted for the use of F&W Publications, and then Xavier University acquired the property in early 2002. Renovations quickly began, with extra space used for offices and rented to Cincinnati Country Day School after one of its buildings collapsed. In June 2004, the university announced that a gift from wealthy alumni would be used to convert the building into an alumni center with space for conferences, banquets, and other types of meetings. Long before that time, the building had been granted recognition by the federal government: while still a manufacturing facility, it was listed on the National Register of Historic Places because of its historically significant architecture. Hundreds of locations in Cincinnati are listed on the National Register, but the bottling plant's status was exceptional due to its young age; it was only about forty years old when designated, and buildings younger than fifty years old can only qualify for designation in the most exceptional circumstances.

The building currently holds the Xavier University National Alumni Association, Community Building Institute, Human Resources, Physical Plant department, and Office of University Communications.

== See also ==
- National Register of Historic Places listings in eastern Cincinnati
