= Peters–Kupferschmid House =

Historic house in Ohio, United States

- U.S. National Register of Historic Places
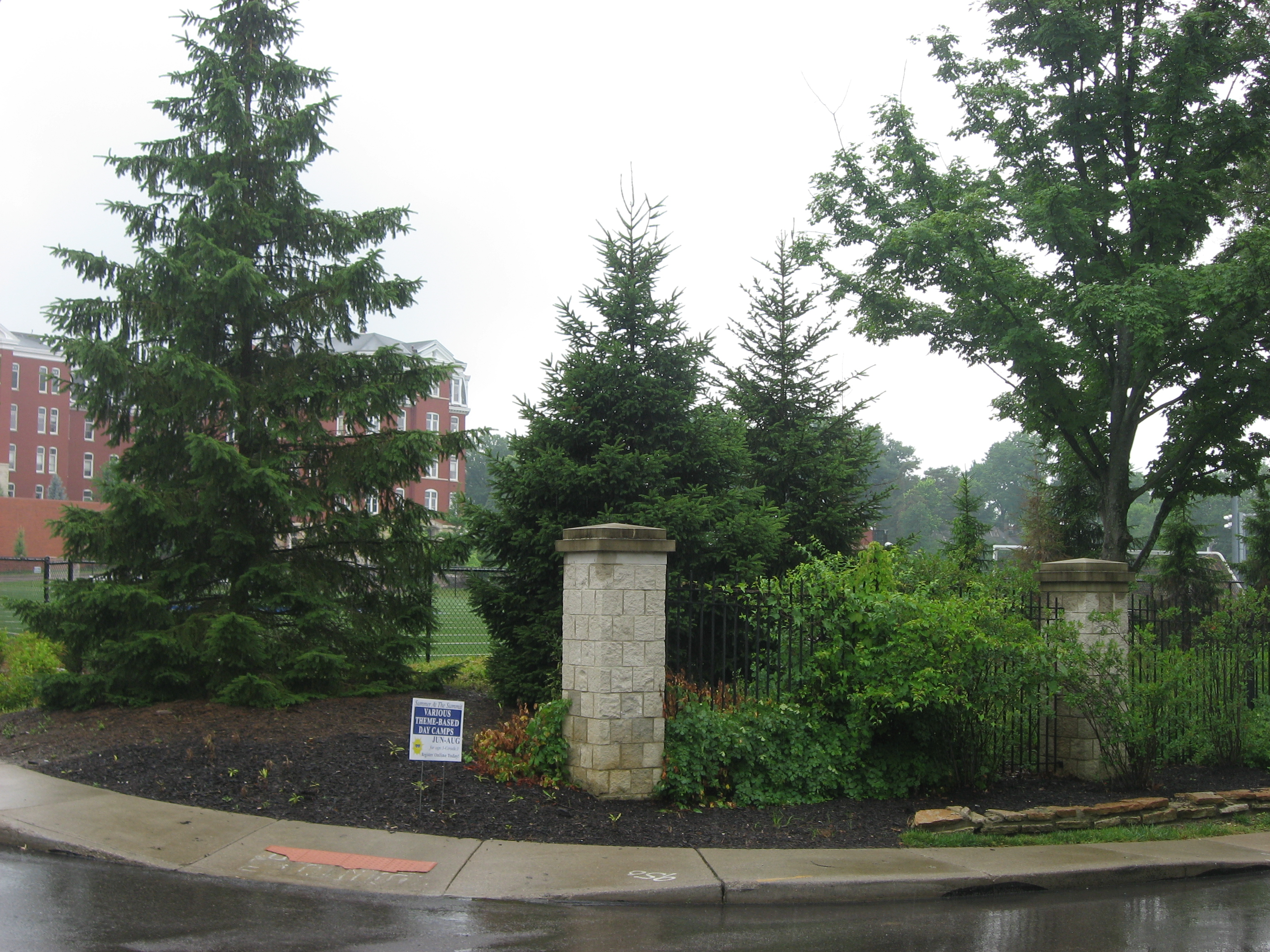
- Site of the house

- Location within Ohio Location within the United States
- Location: 2167 Grandin Road, Cincinnati, Ohio
- Coordinates: 39°7′51.12″N 84°27′29.76″W
- NRHP reference No.: 84000134
- Added to NRHP: October 18, 1984

Peters–Kupferschmid House is a registered historic building in Cincinnati, Ohio, listed in the National Register on October 18, 1984.

== Historic uses ==
- Single Dwelling
