= Stites House =

Historic house in Ohio, United States

- U.S. National Register of Historic Places
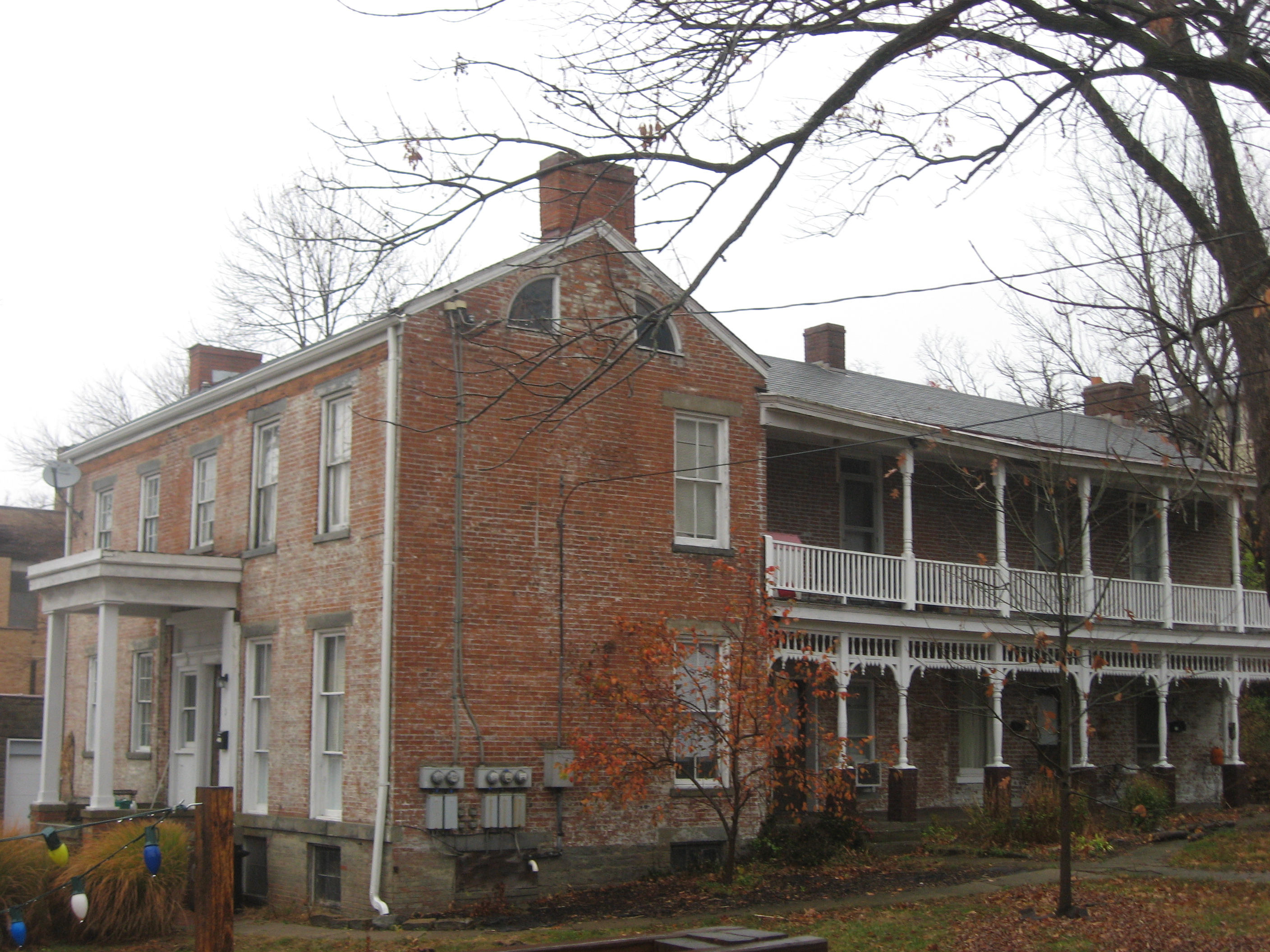
- Front of the house

- Location within Ohio Location within the United States
- Location: 315 Stites Ave., Cincinnati, Ohio
- Coordinates: 39°6′41″N 84°26′5″W
- Built: 1835
- Architectural style: Federal, Greek Revival
- MPS: Columbia-Tusculum MRA
- NRHP reference No.: 79002699
- Added to NRHP: August 24, 1979

The Stites House is a historic residence in the Columbia-Tusculum neighborhood of Cincinnati, Ohio.

== History ==
Built in 1835, it is a brick structure with a stone foundation and a shingled roof; its architecture is a mix of the Federal and Greek Revival styles. The house is composed of two portions: the front, which Hezekiah Stites constructed in 1835, and the large rear wing, which Hezekiah's son Charles added in 1867. The original section is Federal except for its Greek Revival entrance portico: it features typical Federal chimneys and attic windows on the gabled ends, and it is largely free of ornamental elements otherwise. Conversely, the rear wing includes components such as a Victorian porch.

Overall, the Stites House is a well-preserved example of the Federal style and historically significant because of its great age. Depending on the house's age and its status as the home of the families of some of the community's founders, it received substantial attention in a historic preservation survey of Columbia-Tusculum conducted in 1978. One year later, the house was listed on the National Register of Historic Places due to its historically significant architecture. It was one of seventeen Columbia-Tusculum properties included in a multiple property submission related to the previous year's historic preservation survey; most of the properties were buildings, but the Columbia Baptist and Fulton-Presbyterian Cemeteries were also included.
