= Samuel Burdsal House =

US historic place

- U.S. National Register of Historic Places
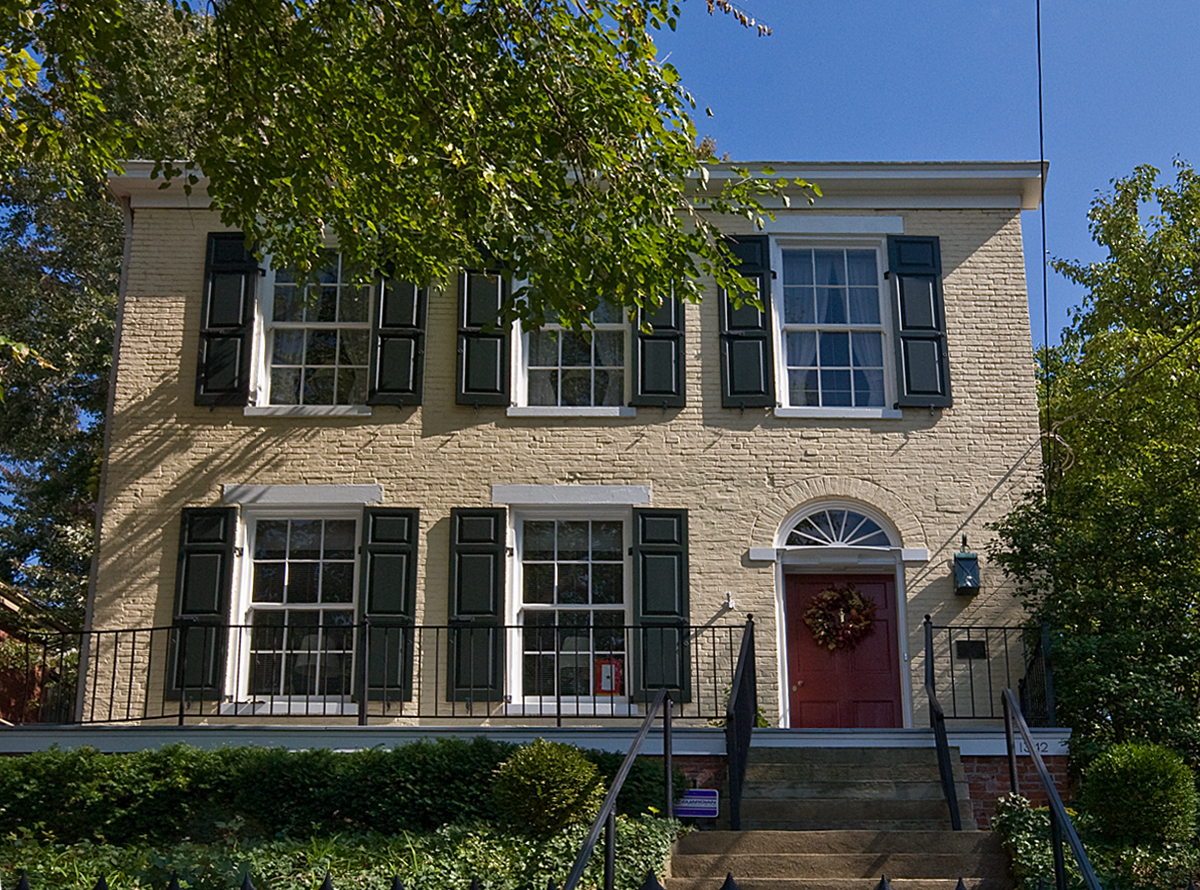
- Front of the house

- Location within Ohio Location within the United States
- Location: 1342 Broadway St., Cincinnati, Ohio
- Coordinates: 39°6′40″N 84°30′30″W
- Area: Less than 1 acre (0.40 ha)
- Built: 1834
- Architectural style: Federal
- NRHP reference No.: 82003577
- Added to NRHP: June 10, 1982

Samuel Burdsal House is a registered historic building in Cincinnati, Ohio, USA, listed in the National Register on June 10, 1982.

== Historic uses ==
The home was built by Samuel Burdsal in 1834 as a dwelling for his family following his marriage to Mary Ann Turner of Boston, Massachusetts. Located in the historic Pendleton district, the home is on the National Register of Historic Places. Known as the "Samuel Burdsal House" the structure was added to the National Register in 1982, number: 82003577. The home is also known as the "Mushkat-Burrow House", and is located at 1342 Broadway St., Cincinnati, Ohio.

The Cincinnati Gazette dated 29 June 1888 discusses Samuel Burdsal and states:

"Samuel Burdsal, seventy-seven years of age, the oldest druggist in Cincinnati, died at fifteen minutes past eleven yesterday morning. He was born in Newtown, January 9, 1812. When a young man of twenty he came to Cincinnati and entered into the drug house of Ashton, Cleveland and Co., on the south-west corner of Fifth and Main streets. Mr. Cleveland, who was a member of the firm, was the uncle of Grover Cleveland, the President, and came from that good old Democrat County of Clermont. When he became of age, Mr. Burdsal went into business for himself and was for a time on Main Street. Afterward he moved to No. 409 Main Street, opposite the Court House, and for fifty two years has occupied these premises consecutively. Five years ago he celebrated his golden wedding at which time Mr. Dunlap, now of Cedarville, who was one of his groomsmen, was present. In the early days of the Volunteer Fire Department Mr. Burdsal was an enthusiastic member and was for many years the Treasurer of the Sevens."

Samuel Burdsal was the son of Joshia Burdsal (Trenton, New Jersey) and Hannah Williamson of Pennsylvania. The couple had two daughters and three sons.

An unusual article titled, "Noted Loungers who used to delight to spit on Burdsal's stove" lists men such as Gen William H. Harrison (President of the US); various judges and noted lawyers, many additional generals and various governors, as well as Samuel Clemens.
