= Park Flats =

- U.S. National Register of Historic Places
- U.S. Historic district – Contributing property
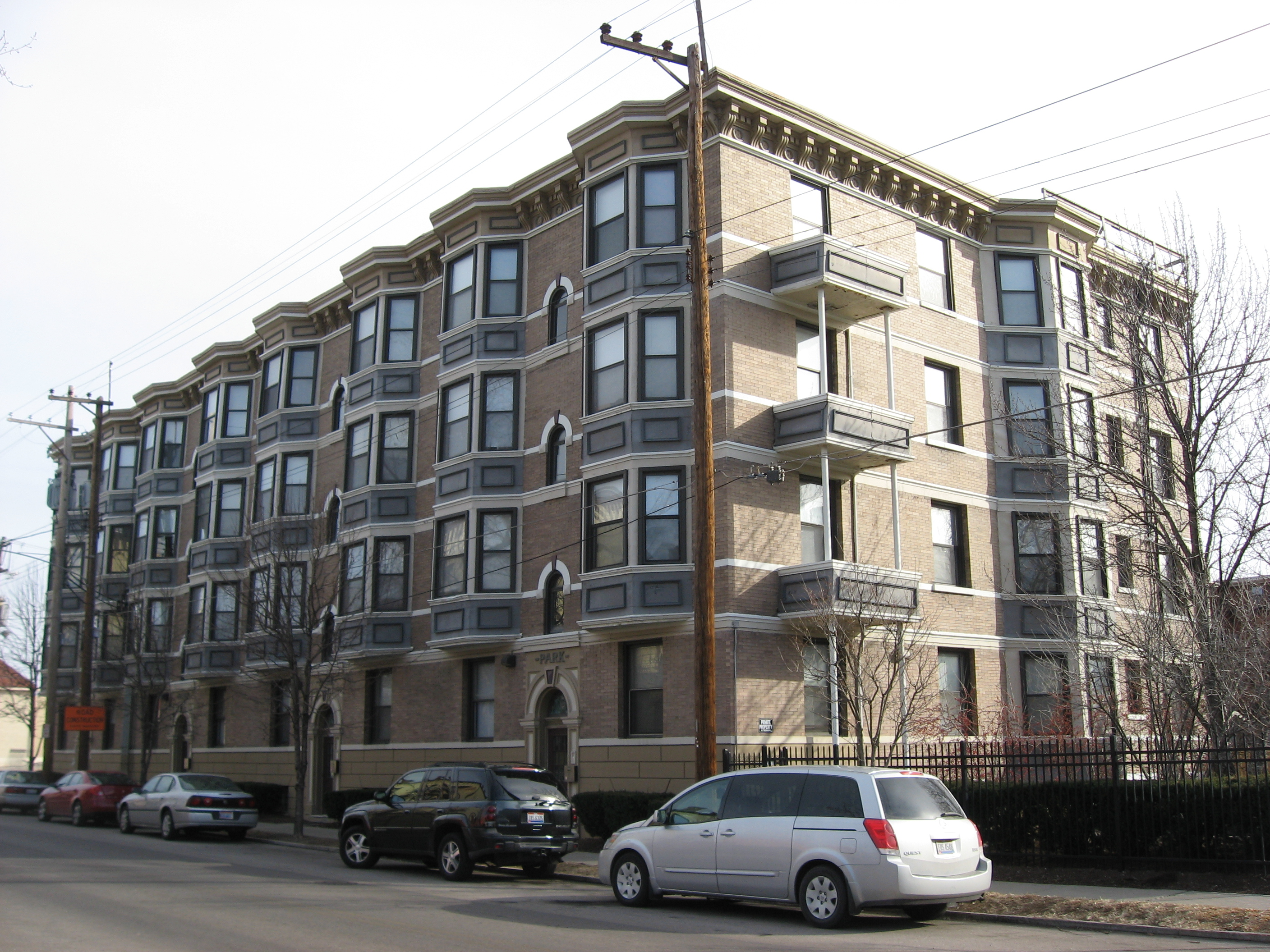
- Front and southern side of the flats

- Location within Ohio Location within the United States
- Location: 2378-2384 Park Ave., Cincinnati, Ohio
- Coordinates: 39°7′32″N 84°29′10″W
- Area: Less than 1 acre (0.40 ha)
- Built: 1904
- Architect: Charles Mayer
- Architectural style: Early Commercial, Chicago School
- Part of: Over-the-Rhine Historic District (ID85002835)
- NRHP reference No.: 83001986
- Added to NRHP: September 8, 1983

The Park Flats are an apartment building in the Walnut Hills neighborhood of Cincinnati, Ohio, United States. Built in 1904, the flats are a four-story brick building with an unusual mix of architectural styles.

Around 1900, Charles Mayer left the insurance business and became involved in real estate development. One of his projects was the Park Flats, which he built with numerous architectural innovations. Among these features were large bay windows with metal frames, two belt courses per story, and multiple colors of bricks. Constructed with the plan of a rectangle, Mayer's finished building includes elements of stone and stucco. It combines multiple elements of early twentieth century Neoclassical architecture with other features of the newly emergent Chicago School.

In the late 2000s, developed Ed Horgan began to restore several different multi-unit residential buildings in the Walnut Hills neighborhood. Once home to many wealthy Cincinnatians, the neighborhood had fallen into poverty and high levels of crime, but Horgan believed that his project could attract prosperous young adults to gentrify the area. Besides the Park Flats, he purchased and renovated multiple properties, chief of which was the former Verona Apartments. With the completion of his project, the building comprised thirty-six apartments featuring elements such as wooden floors. Among the aspects of the building that Horgan encountered was its historic designation: the Park Flats were placed on the National Register of Historic Places in 1983, qualifying for inclusion because of their historically significant architecture. Two years later, much of Walnut Hills was declared a historic district and listed on the National Register as the Peeble's Corner Historic District; among its dozens of contributing properties were the Park Flats.
