= Bauer Apartments =

- U.S. National Register of Historic Places
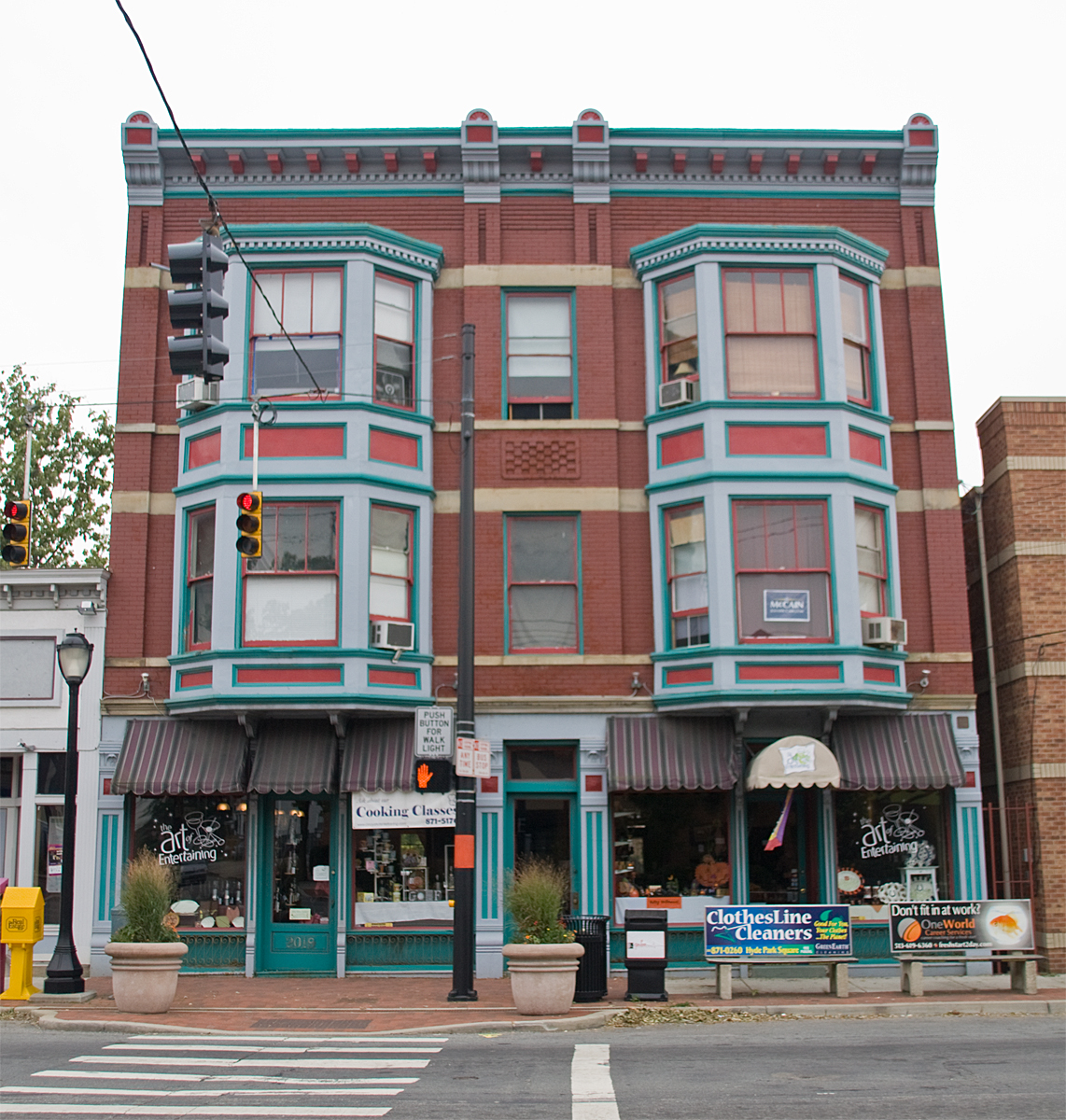
- Front of the apartments

- Location within Ohio Location within the United States
- Location: 2015-2017 Madison Rd., Cincinnati, Ohio
- Coordinates: 39°7′55″N 84°27′44″W
- Area: less than one acre
- Built: 1885
- Architectural style: Queen Anne
- NRHP reference No.: 82001465
- Added to NRHP: December 2, 1982

The Bauer Apartments are a historic apartment building in the city of Cincinnati, Ohio, United States. Located along Madison Road on the city's eastern side, it is a brick building with elements of sandstone and metal. The Bauer has been rated as an exceptionally well-preserved example of the Queen Anne style of architecture. Among the most significant elements of its architecture are details such as a bracketed cornice, some courses with corbelling, and a belt of sandstone, plus larger elements such as significant rectangular panels on the facade and massive bay windows. Inside, many original details have survived to the present day, such as elaborate balusters in the halls, the wainscoting on the corners of the rooms, and the plain fireplace mantels.

From their construction in 1885 until 1947, the apartments were owned by the family of Ulrick Bauer, a local greengrocer. Both historically and in the present, they have been used both for residential purposes and as the location of a specialty store. In 1982, the Bauer Apartments were listed on the National Register of Historic Places, due to their well-preserved historic architecture.
