= Bernheim House =

Historic house in Ohio, United States

- U.S. National Register of Historic Places
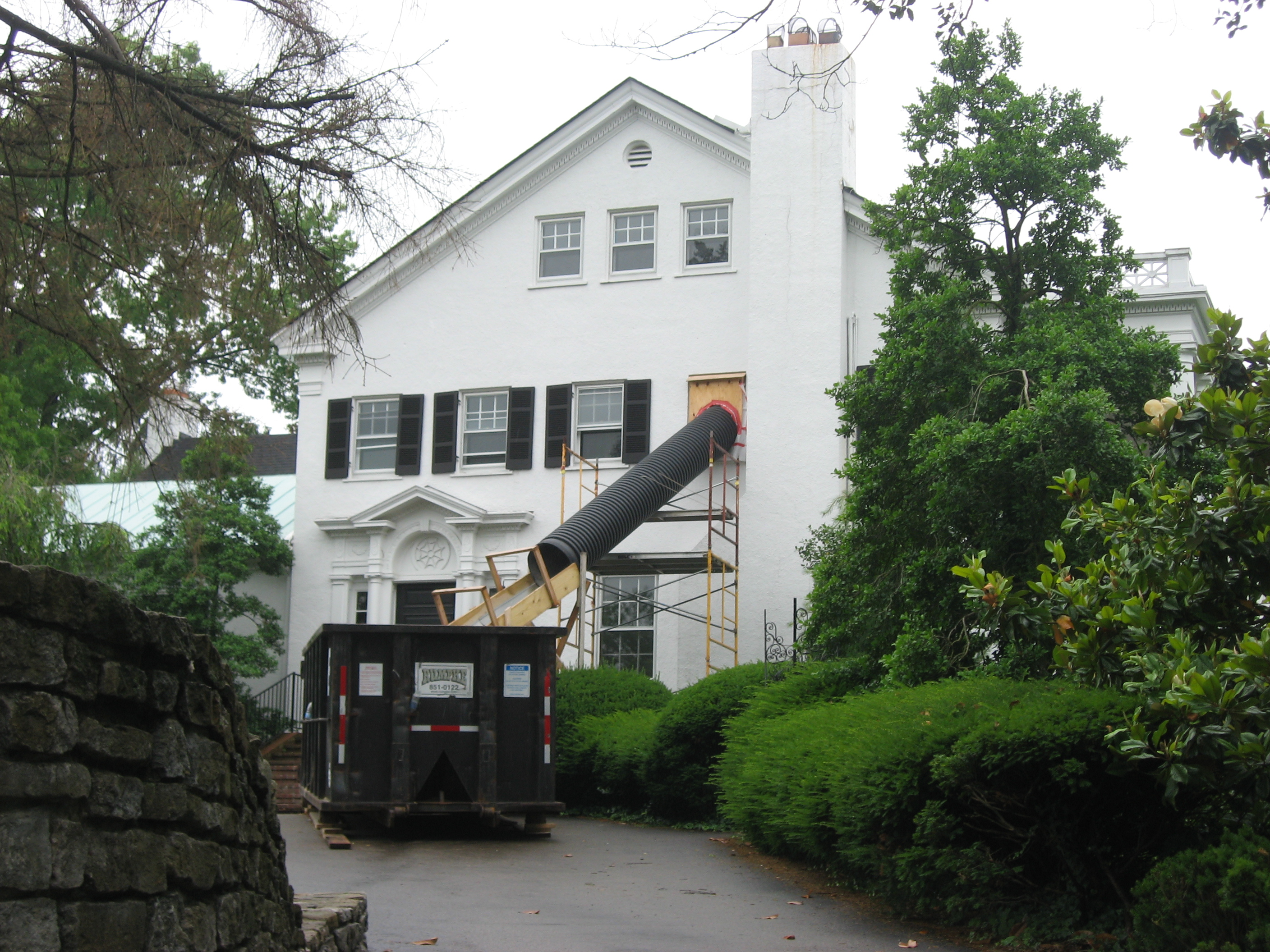
- Front of the house

- Location within Ohio Location within the United States
- Location: 195 Greenhills Rd., Cincinnati, Ohio
- Coordinates: 39°7′55″N 84°26′35″W
- Area: 1.3 acres (0.53 ha)
- Built: 1912
- Architectural style: Colonial Revival
- NRHP reference No.: 83001977
- Added to NRHP: March 29, 1983

The Bernheim House is a historic residence in eastern Cincinnati, Ohio, United States. Built in 1912, the house is one of the city's best examples of Colonial Revival architecture. Among its prominent architectural elements are its employment of the Palladian arch, a two-story entrance portico, multiple pilasters, and a cornice with dentilling. Its location atop a hill and on a large, otherwise-undeveloped lot make it a prominent component of the vicinity. The oldest house in the neighborhood, it is built of brick and stucco with wooden elements.

Morris and Delia Bernheim arranged for the construction of the house in 1912 on open land approximately 13 acres (5.3 ha) in area. One of the owners of a conveyor belt factory, Morris chose to subdivide his property in the 1920s into two separate developments. In contrast to the Bernheim House, most of the houses in the development are built in the Tudor Revival style of architecture, thus increasing the distinctive architecture of the oldest house in the neighborhood. Because of its distinctive historic architecture, the Bernheim House was listed on the National Register of Historic Places in 1983.

It remains privately owned.
