= East Walnut Hills Firehouse =

- U.S. National Register of Historic Places
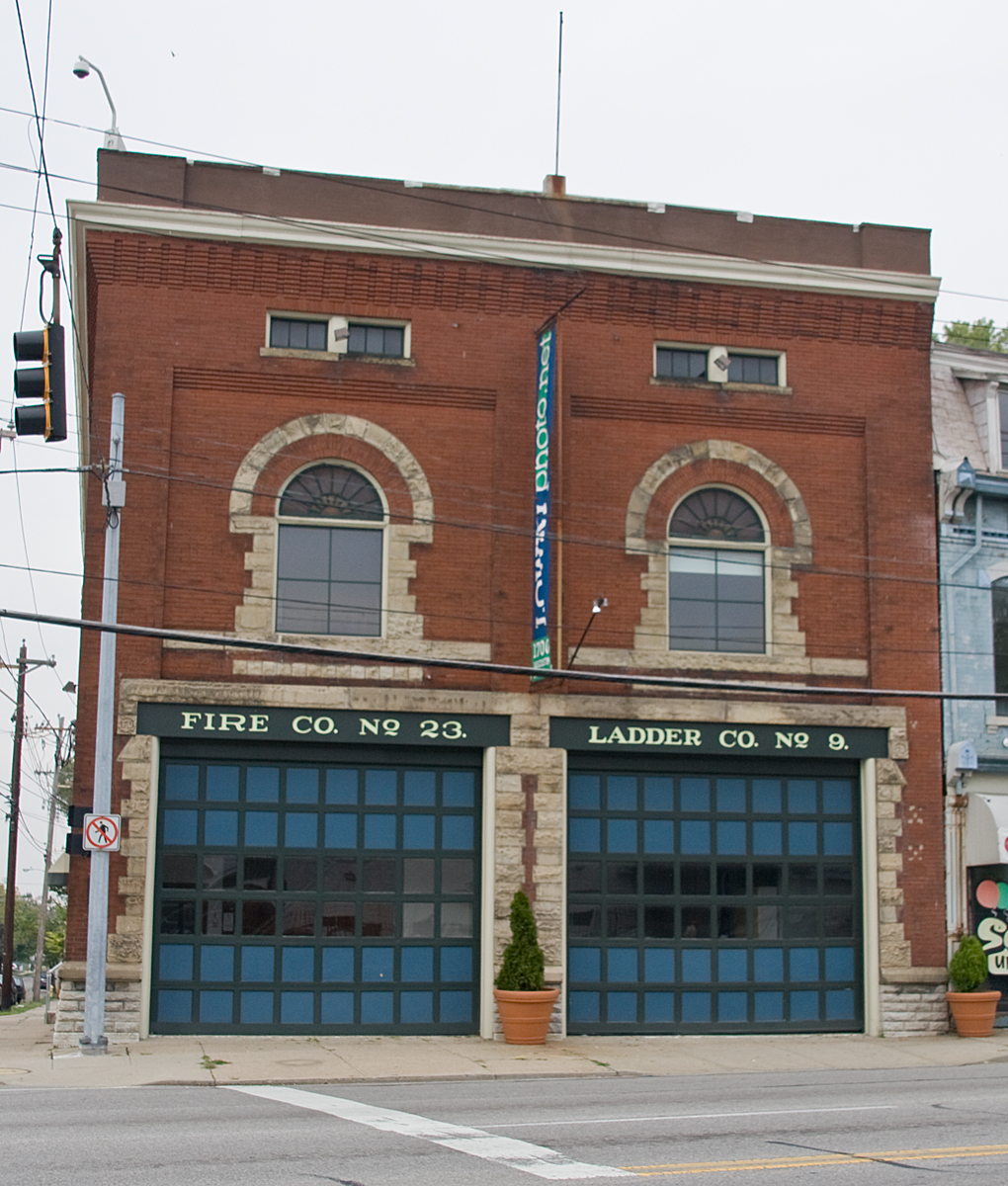

- Location within Ohio Location within the United States
- Location: Madison Rd. and Hackberry St., Cincinnati, Ohio
- Coordinates: 39°7′48″N 84°28′28″W
- Built: 1886
- NRHP reference No.: 83001980
- Added to NRHP: February 17, 1983

East Walnut Hills Firehouse is a registered historic building in Cincinnati, Ohio, listed in the National Register on February 17, 1983. It is in the East Walnut Hills neighborhood.

Built in 1886, it accommodated the Fire Company No. 23 and Ladder Company No. 9.
