= Mill & Dunn Historic District =

Area of Lockland in Ohio, United States

Coordinates: 39.2239°N 84.4528°W

The Mill & Dunn Historic District represents the older core of a business district in the Village of Lockland, which is situated about 10 miles (16 km) north of downtown Cincinnati. There are 41 buildings in this roughly 10 acre district of which 35 are contributing resources to the district. Most are two-story, two-part brick commercial blocks dating through 1930, with a few one-part commercial blocks, generally after 1925. Styles represented include Italianate, Queen Anne, Second Renaissance Revival, Tudor Revival Art Deco and Art Moderne. The district was listed on the National Register of Historic Places in 2019.

The district is significant as Lockland's oldest commercial core, which developed in response to transportation and industry, particularly the streetcar, which ran through the district from 1898 to 1951.
