= Stephen A. Gerrard Mansion =

- U.S. National Register of Historic Places
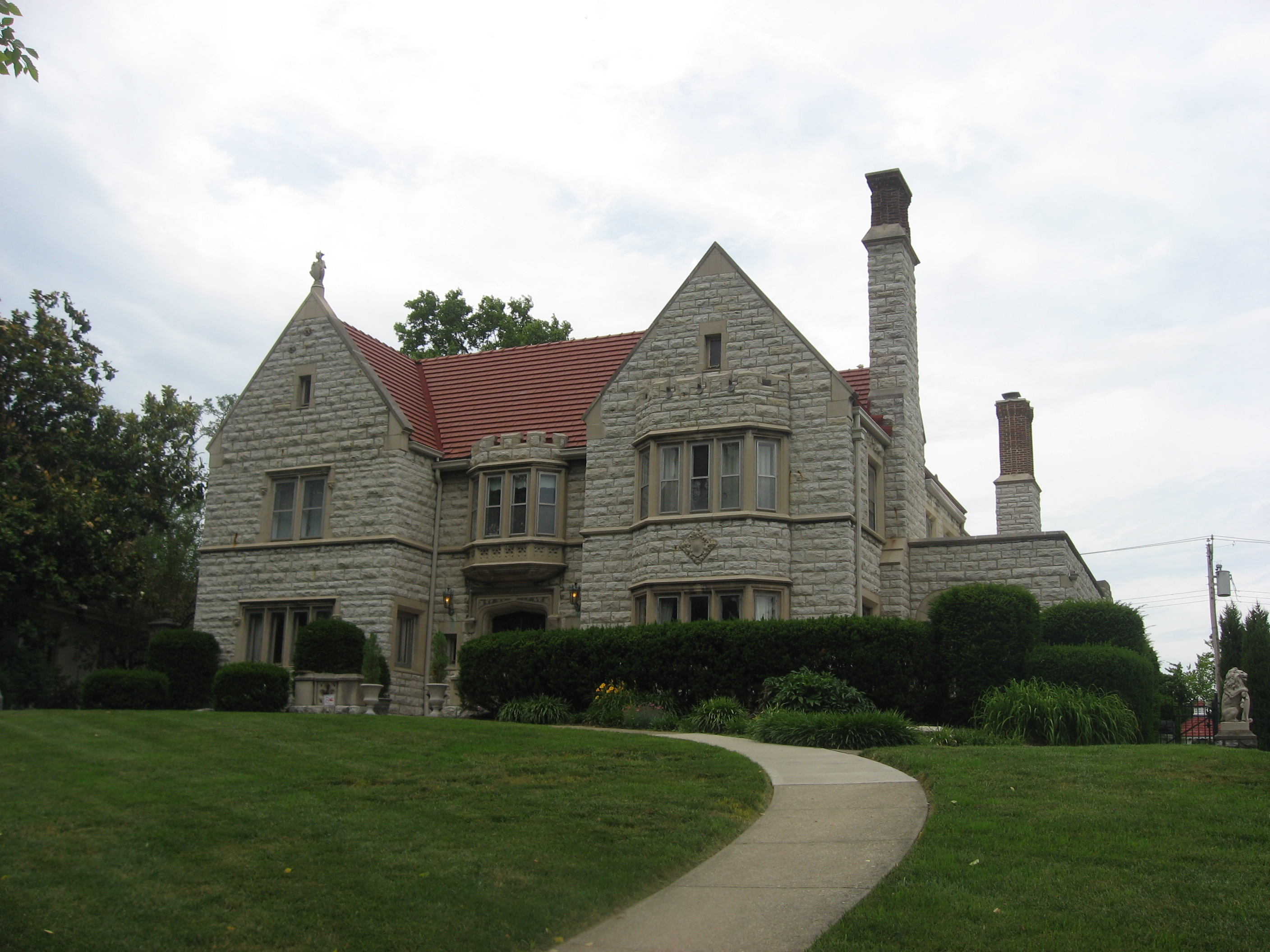
- Front of the house

- Location within Ohio Location within the United States
- Location: 748 Betula Ave., Cincinnati, Ohio
- Coordinates: 39°9′40″N 84°29′7″W
- Area: Less than 1 acre (0.40 ha)
- Built: 1915
- Architect: C.C. and A.E. Weber
- Architectural style: Tudor Revival
- NRHP reference No.: 87001940
- Added to NRHP: November 5, 1987

The Stephen A. Gerrard Mansion is a historic residence in the North Avondale neighborhood of Cincinnati, Ohio, United States. Constructed for a self-made grocery magnate, the Tudor Revival mansion has been named a historic site.

Born in 1860 in the Cincinnati-area community of Cherry Grove, Stephen Gerrard supported himself in his youth as a street peddler, but ultimately made himself wealthy by taking advantage of refrigerated rail cars to transport cantaloupes nationwide, selling them far more widely than was otherwise possible. His sales of Colorado melons throughout the country's central and eastern regions enriched Gerrard, gaining him the nickname of "Cantaloupe King", and enabling him to build the present house in 1915 as well as constructing a grand mausoleum in the same section of Spring Grove Cemetery as other prominent local businessmen. Its location in North Avondale, a gaslight neighborhood, made Gerrard a neighbor to some of Cincinnati's economic élites. However, his fortune was destroyed by the Great Depression, and he died in 1936.

Built of limestone with a limestone foundation, the Tudor Revival house is covered with a slate roof. Two and a half stories tall, the house features an irregular plan, with battlement-topped bay windows in assorted gables, tall chimneys, and a porte-cochère sheltering the main entrance. The windows are sheltered by hoodmolds, and the upper and lower sections of the facade are separated by a stone belt course. Decorative elements in the upper part of the house include a pair of gargoyles atop the roof and the ornamental chimney pots atop the chimneys. Extensive wooden panelling beautifies the interiors, which feature ornamental ceilings and marble fireplaces. Upon its completion, the house possessed its own pipe organ, made by W.W. Kimball of Chicago. The entire house has an area of 5,400 square feet (500 m^{2}).

In late 1987, the Gerrard mansion was listed on the National Register of Historic Places, qualifying because of its historically significant architecture. Another house with the same designation, the older Richard H. Mitchell House, lies just a few minutes' walk away.
