= Wilson-Gibson House =

Historic house in Ohio, United States

- U.S. National Register of Historic Places
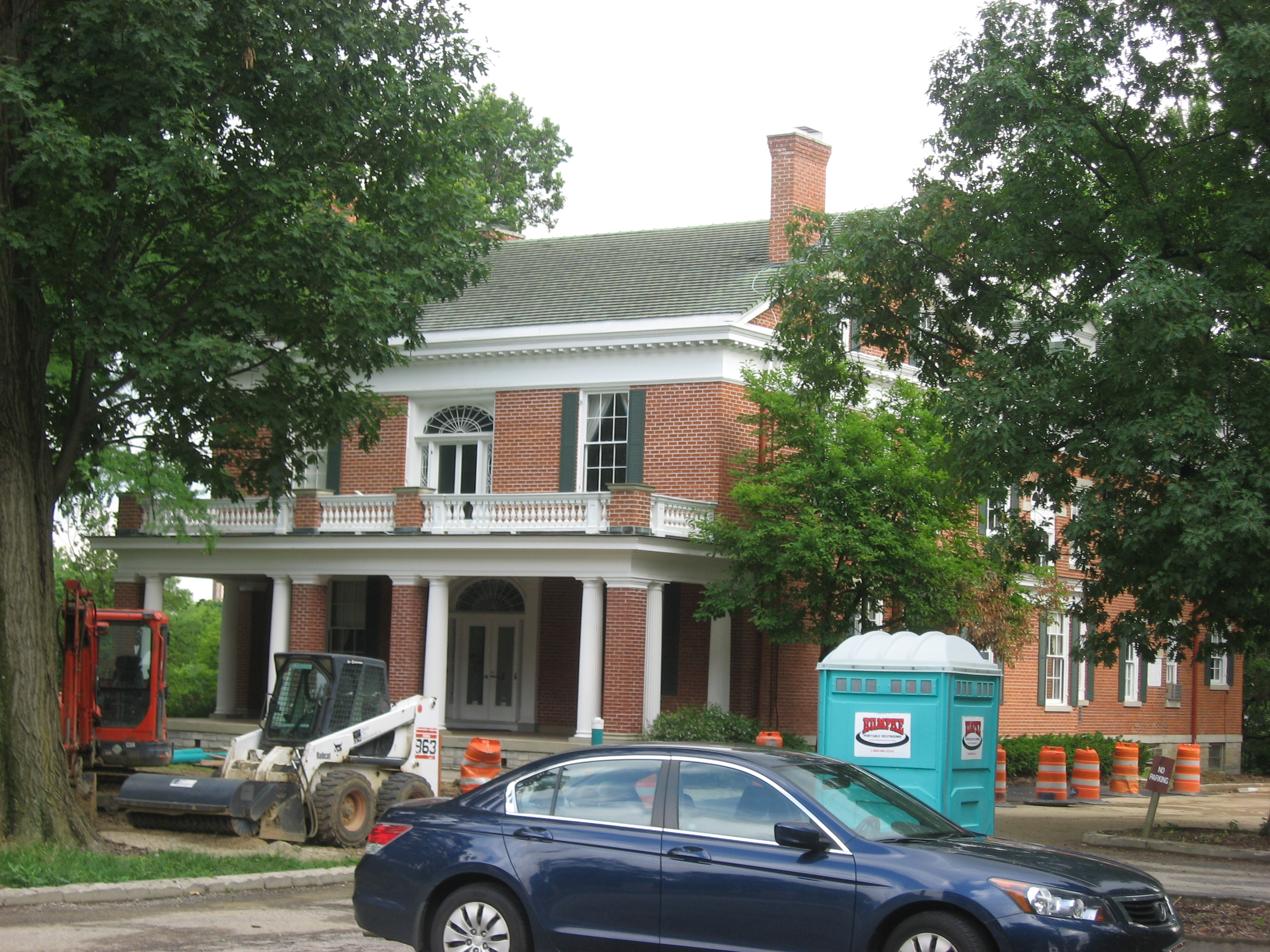
- Front and side of the house

- Location within Ohio Location within the United States
- Location: 425 Oak St., Cincinnati, Ohio
- Coordinates: 39°7′49″N 84°30′1″W
- Area: Less than 1 acre (0.40 ha)
- Built: 1860
- Architectural style: Neoclassical, Federal
- NRHP reference No.: 76001444
- Added to NRHP: March 17, 1976

The Wilson-Gibson House is a historic residence in Cincinnati, Ohio, United States. Constructed in the middle of the 19th century, it features a mix of two prominent architectural styles, and it has been named a historic site.

The lot currently located at 425 Oak Street was originally part of a subdivision known as "Vernon Village". Although the property was first owned by John Frazier, James Wilson bought it in 1859 at sheriff's sale and soon began construction on the site. Soon after its completion in the following year, Wilson's brother moved into the new house and lived in it for thirteen years, vacating it only at his death. Among the later owners was Louis Hauck, whose daughter Katherine Gibson was the owner whose name is on the house.

Built of brick on a stone foundation, the Wilson-Gibson House is a two-and-a-half-story residence with walls full of shuttered windows. Unusually, it mixes components of two popular architectural styles that overlapped but little: the earlier Federal style and the later Neoclassical style. Cincinnati architectural historians have suggested that the house is patterned after the Taft Museum of Art downtown; both buildings are brick Federal structures with fanlights and sidelights around their grand double doors, paired internal chimneys, and six-over-six windows.

In 1976, the Wilson-Gibson House was listed on the National Register of Historic Places. One of nearly 250 Cincinnati locations on the Register, it qualified for inclusion based on its distinctive historic architecture.
