= Frederick Lunkenheimer House =

Historic house in Ohio, United States

- U.S. National Register of Historic Places
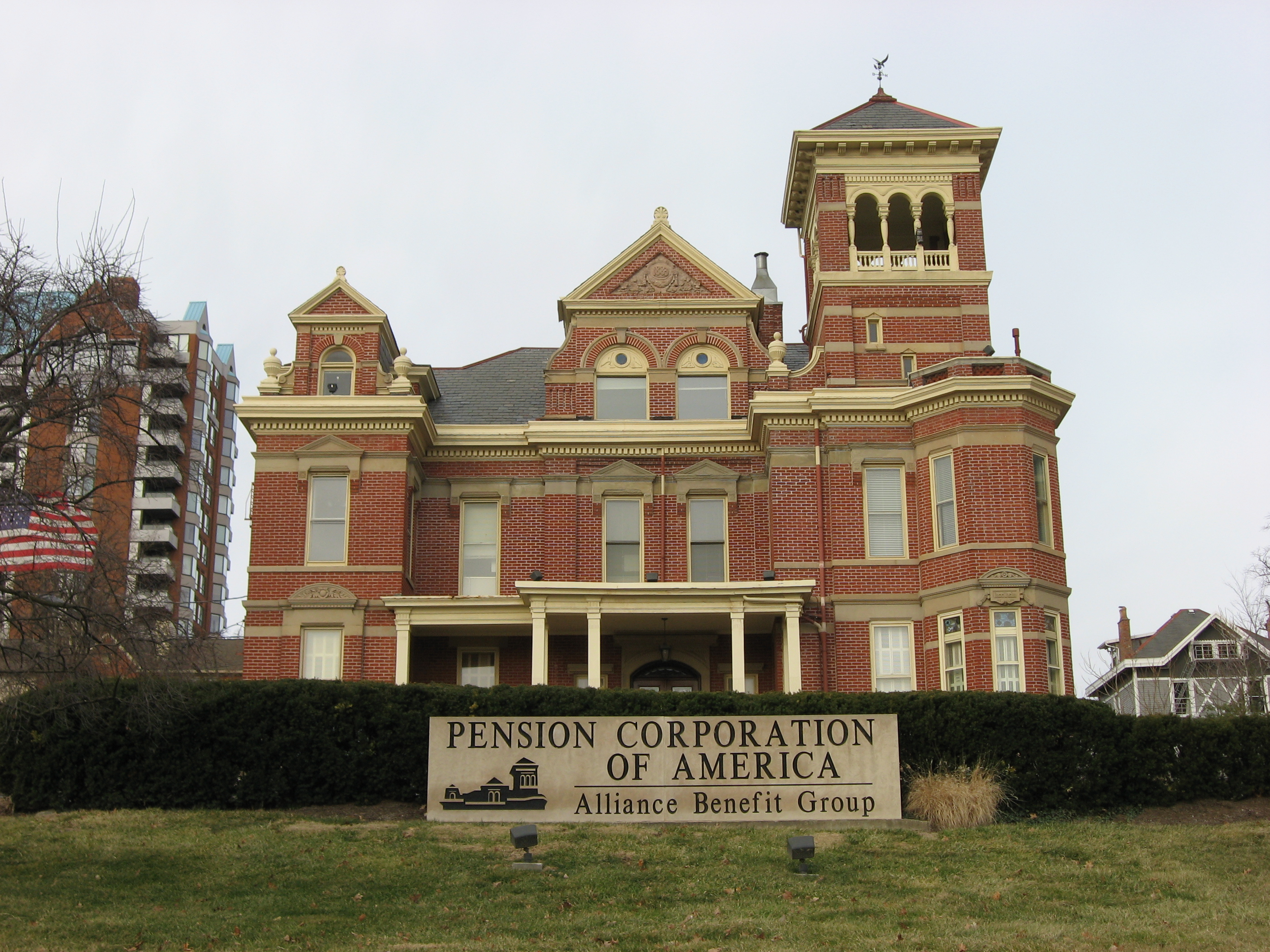
- Front of the house

- Location within Ohio Location within the United States
- Location: 2133 Luray, Cincinnati, Ohio
- Coordinates: 39°7′7″N 84°29′18″W
- Area: Less than 1 acre (0.40 ha)
- Built: 1883
- Architectural style: Late Victorian, Eclectic Late Victorian
- NRHP reference No.: 85001690
- Added to NRHP: August 8, 1985

The Frederick Lunkenheimer House is a historic residence on the east side of Cincinnati, Ohio, United States. Built in 1883, it is a brick building with a stone foundation, a slate roof, and smaller elements of sandstone. Measuring two-and-a-half stories tall, the house features a wide range of architectural styles. Although the dominant theme is a general Late Victorian style, the house additionally includes Italianate elements such as the detailed lintels and the elaborate belvedere. Similarly, the Queen Anne style appears in such components as the elevated ashlar foundation, ornamental dormers, and multiple stone courses on the walls.

The house's namesake was a manufacturing innovator and entrepreneur; his firm, the Lunkenheimer Valve Company, gained a worldwide reputation for the steam valves and other mechanical elements that it produced.

As the founder, Frederick Lunkenheimer was responsible for a wide range of specialized products in the field.

In 1985, the Lunkenheimer House was listed on the National Register of Historic Places, qualifying both because of its distinctive historic architecture and because of its place as the home of a leading local citizen. Today, it is no longer a house, having been converted into offices for the Pension Corporation of America, and the Alliance Benefit Group.
