= Theodore Krumberg Building =

- U.S. National Register of Historic Places
- U.S. Historic district – Contributing property
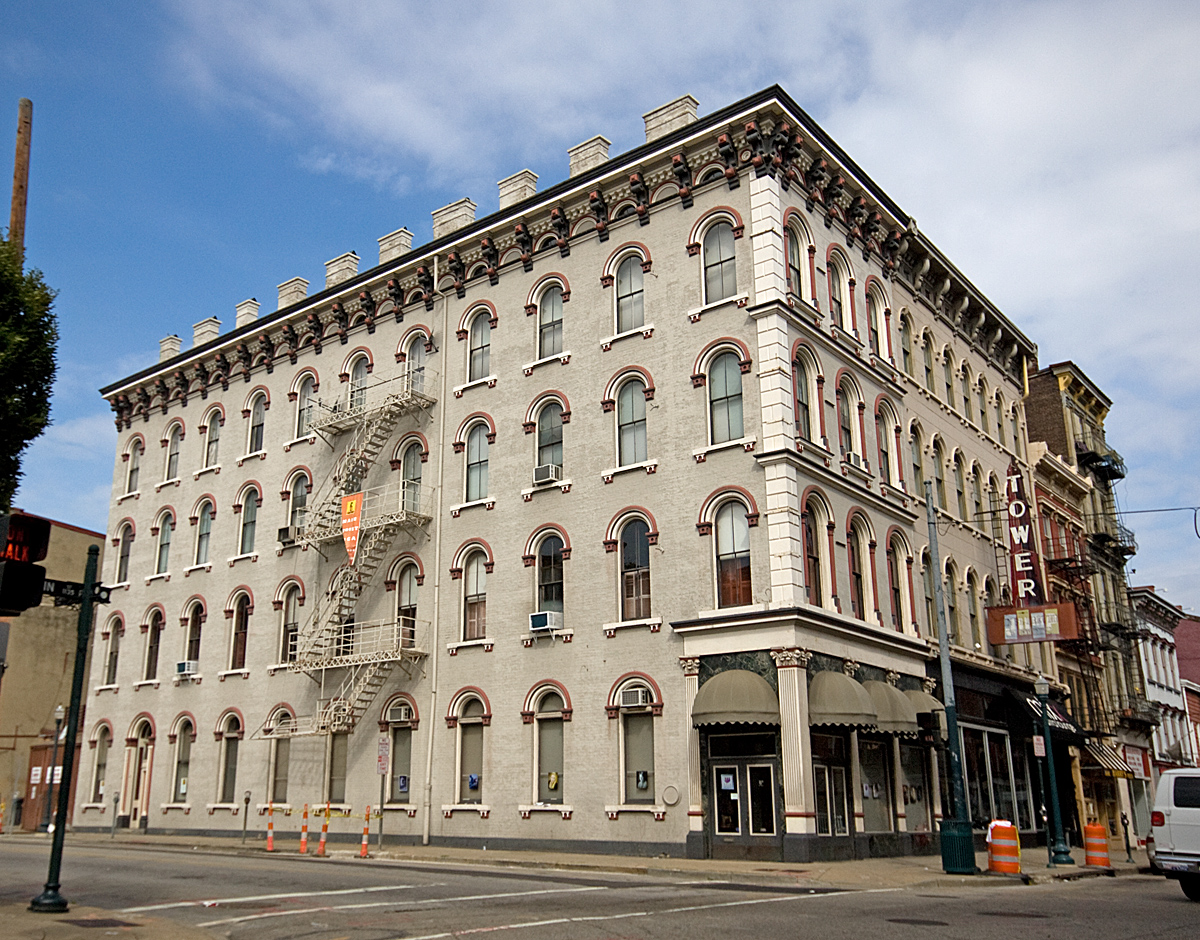
- Front and southern side of the building

- Location within Ohio Location within the United States
- Location: 1201 Main St., Cincinnati, Ohio
- Coordinates: 39°6′32″N 84°30′42″W
- Area: less than one acre
- Built: 1871
- Architect: Theodore Krumberg
- Architectural style: Italianate
- Part of: Over-the-Rhine Historic District (ID83001985)
- NRHP reference No.: 82001467
- Added to NRHP: December 17, 1982

The Theodore Krumberg Building is a historic commercial building and former bank in the Over-the-Rhine neighborhood of Cincinnati, Ohio, United States. Built in the Italianate style in 1871, the Krumberg Building is one of the most significant structures in Over-the-Rhine when considered from an architectural point of view, due to its size and its location at the intersection of Main and Twelfth Streets.

Theodore Krumberg erected the present building in the early 1870s as a home for his dry goods store; part of the building was employed for retailing purposes, while other parts served as a warehouse for his business. Krumberg chose many elaborate elements for his building: the walls are built of brick, but many significant elements are made of smooth sandstone, such as the lintels, an ornate cornice, and bracketed lug sills. Additionally, certain details are made of marble or iron. Measuring four stories tall, the Krumberg Building features a massive facade many bays wide; throughout its exterior, the Italianate style is evident.

In 1982, the Theodore Krumberg Building was listed on the National Register of Historic Places, qualifying for inclusion because of its historically significant architecture. One year later, most of Over-the-Rhine was added to the Register as a historic district, and the Krumberg Building qualified as one of its hundreds of contributing properties.
