= Charlton Wallace House =

Historic house in Ohio, United States

- U.S. National Register of Historic Places
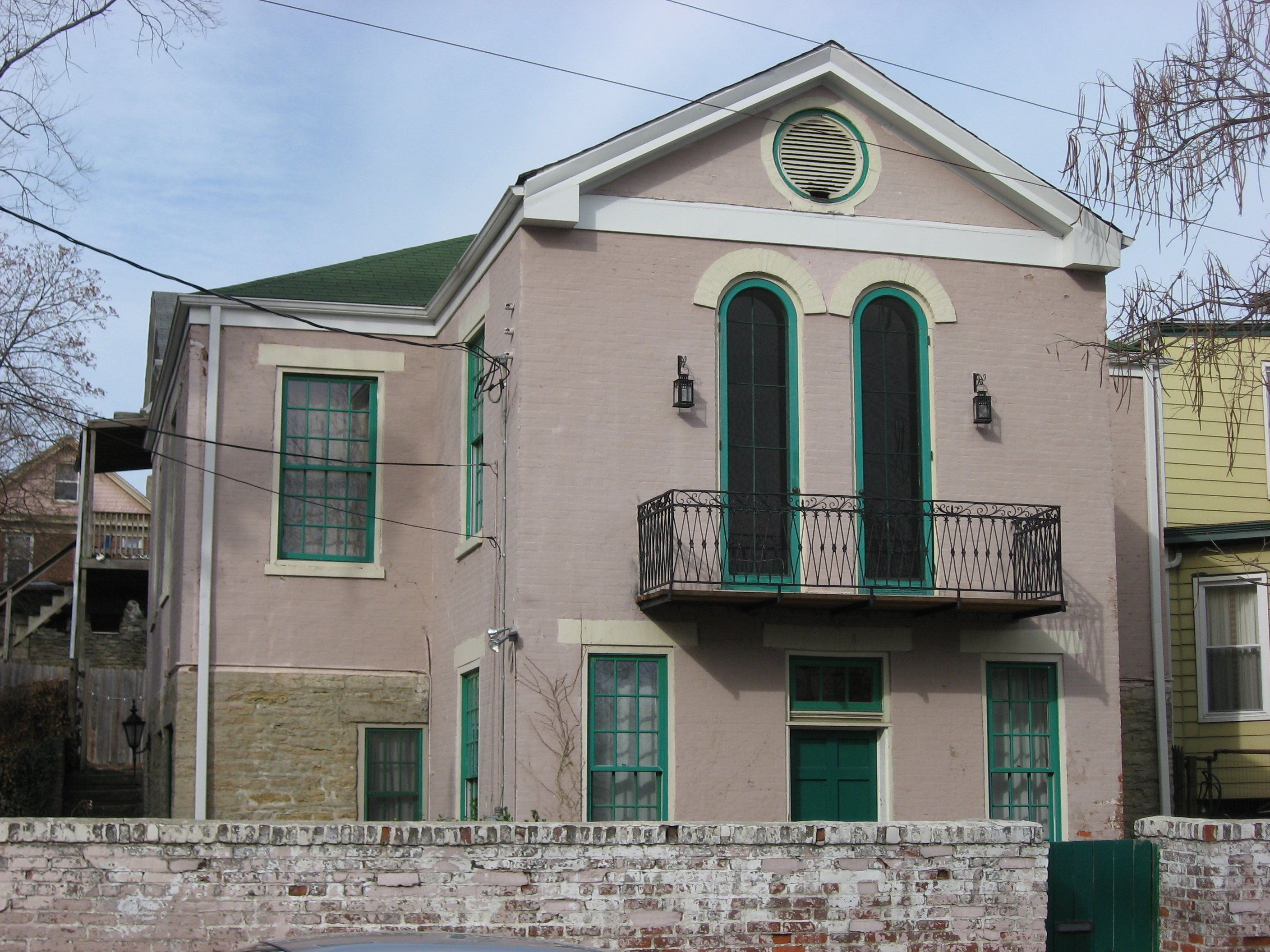
- Front of the house

- Location within Ohio Location within the United States
- Location: 2563 Hackberry St., Cincinnati, Ohio
- Coordinates: 39°7′37″N 84°28′36″W
- Area: Less than 1 acre (0.40 ha)
- Built: 1840
- Architectural style: French Provincial
- NRHP reference No.: 76001441
- Added to NRHP: January 30, 1976

The Charlton Wallace House is a historic residence in the East Walnut Hills neighborhood of Cincinnati, Ohio, United States. Older than all other houses in the neighborhood, it was constructed in 1840 for a group of French-born Catholic monks who brought the house's elaborate wrought iron up the Mississippi River from New Orleans.

Built with a mix of stone and brick on a stone foundation, the Wallace House was constructed in a distinctive French Provincial style of architecture. Its unusual architecture mixes plain, unadorned elements with certain Romantic elements that is common in French Provincial buildings in the United States. In 1849, the house was converted into a rectory for the newly founded St. Francis de Sales Catholic Church. Given its new role, the house became a leading part of the Catholic Church's presence in the neighborhood. With the construction of the new church building on an adjacent lot in 1851, the parish priest moved into the house, and it was also used as the parish school in its earliest years. Additionally, the house may have served a more surreptitious purpose: local legend holds that a room in the rear of the basement was employed as a station on the Underground Railroad.

In 1877, the parish began to build its present complex of buildings on Woodburn Avenue in Walnut Hills. After the completion of the new property, the parish sold the property; it was later used as the private residence of a family named Baumgartner. In 1976, the house was listed on the National Register of Historic Places, qualifying because of its well-preserved historic architecture and because of its place in local history.
