= Kestler Building =

- U.S. National Register of Historic Places
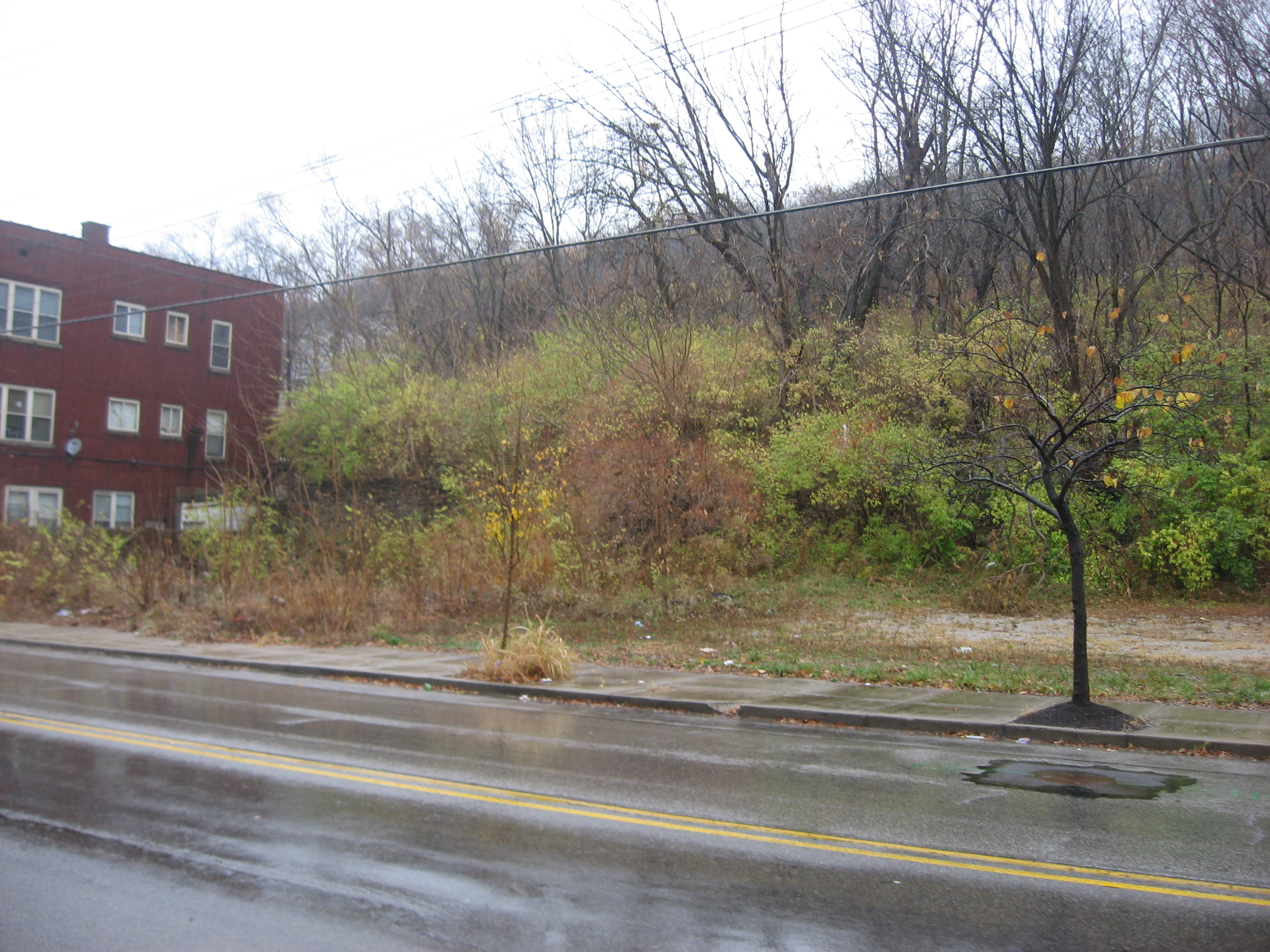
- Site of the building

- Location within Ohio Location within the United States
- Location: 4024 Eastern Ave., Cincinnati, Ohio
- Coordinates: 39°6′31″N 84°25′56″W
- Area: 0 acres (0 ha)
- Built: 1906
- Architectural style: Early Commercial
- MPS: Columbia-Tusculum MRA
- NRHP reference No.: 79002695
- Added to NRHP: August 24, 1979

The Kestler Building was one of many historic buildings in the Columbia-Tusculum neighborhood of Cincinnati, Ohio, United States. Originally a store, it was a weatherboarded building set on a stone foundation. Parts of the building were once used for residential purposes, in addition to the commercial space. Along with many other buildings in the neighborhood, it was listed on the National Register of Historic Places on August 24, 1979, qualifying because of its historically significant architecture; like several other Eastern Avenue commercial buildings, it was deemed historic partially because of its exterior design work.
