= August Bepler House =

- U.S. National Register of Historic Places
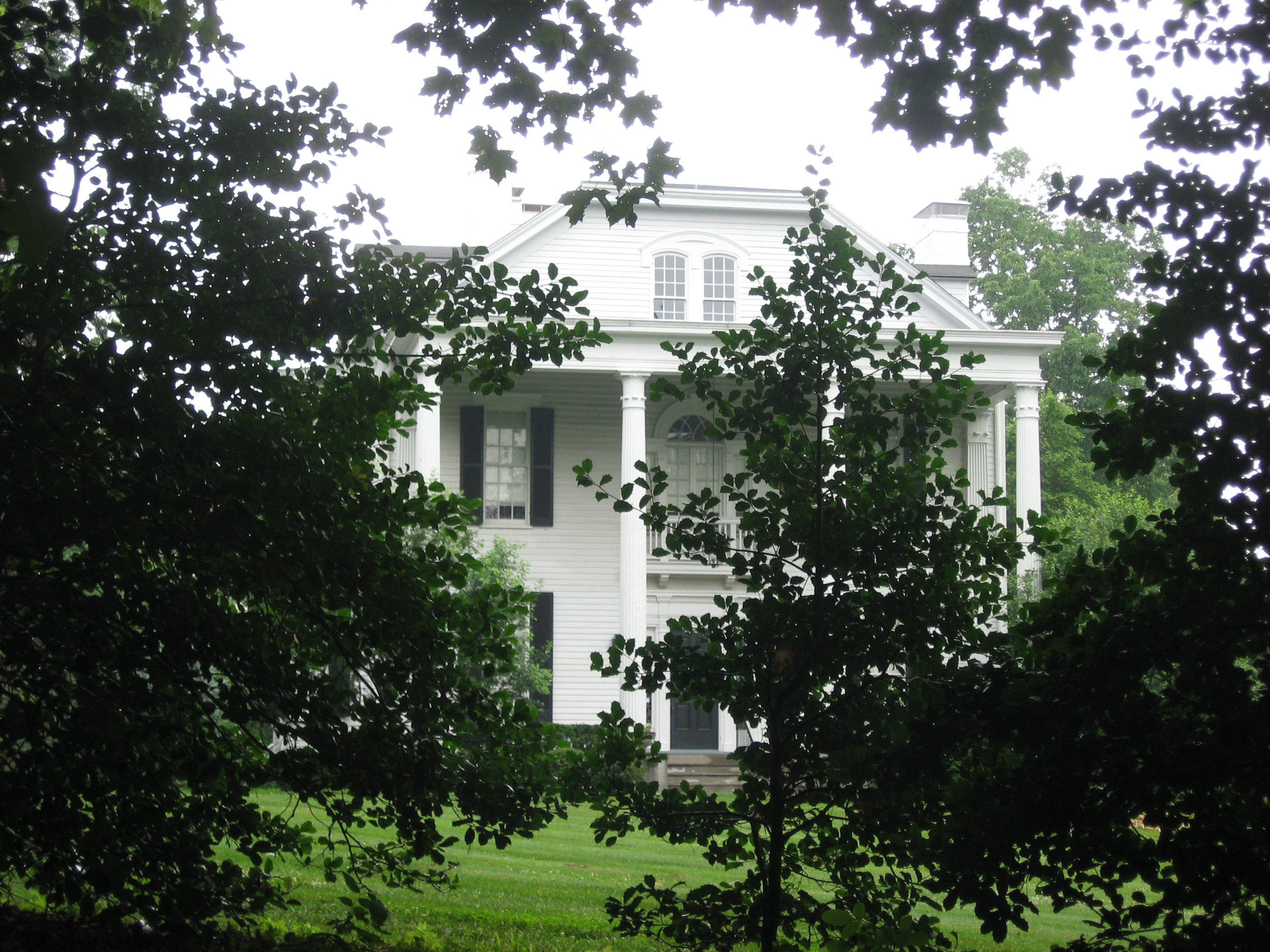
- Front of the house

- Location within Ohio Location within the United States
- Location: 805 Tusculum Ave., Cincinnati, Ohio
- Coordinates: 39°6′59″N 84°25′31″W
- Area: 4.1 acres (1.7 ha)
- Built: 1869
- Architectural style: Neoclassical
- NRHP reference No.: 77001062
- Added to NRHP: April 13, 1977

The August Bepler House is a historic residence in the city of Cincinnati, Ohio, United States. Located along Tusculum Avenue in that city's Columbia-Tusculum neighborhood, the house was built in 1869 for a wealthy inventor and industrialist, and it has been named a historic site.

August Bepler made himself wealthy by inventing a machine to produce a new type of product, the flat-bottomed paper bag. The foreign-born Bepler settled in the United States in 1851; within four years he had formed a company to manufacture paper bags in the Cincinnati-area village of Lockland, although he relocated the firm to Cincinnati in 1858. Using the wealth gained from the company, Bepler arranged for the construction of the present house in 1869. He later paid for the construction of a second house to functionally the same design, but this later house, located in St. Louis, Missouri, is no longer standing.

Two stories tall with a weatherboarded exterior, the house rests on a stone foundation, is covered with a tin roof, and features elements of brick. A large bay window occupies much of the side on the left of a viewer facing the front of the house, while the facade itself features a large columned porch; the columns are topped with capitals resembling those of the ancient Corinthian order. Together with smaller elements, the colonnade creates an excellent Neoclassical appearance, a style not particularly common in the area.

In 1977, the Bepler House was listed on the National Register of Historic Places, qualifying both because of its historically significant architecture and because it had been the home of a prominent local resident.
