= Ayres L. Bramble House =

Historic house in Ohio, United States

- U.S. National Register of Historic Places
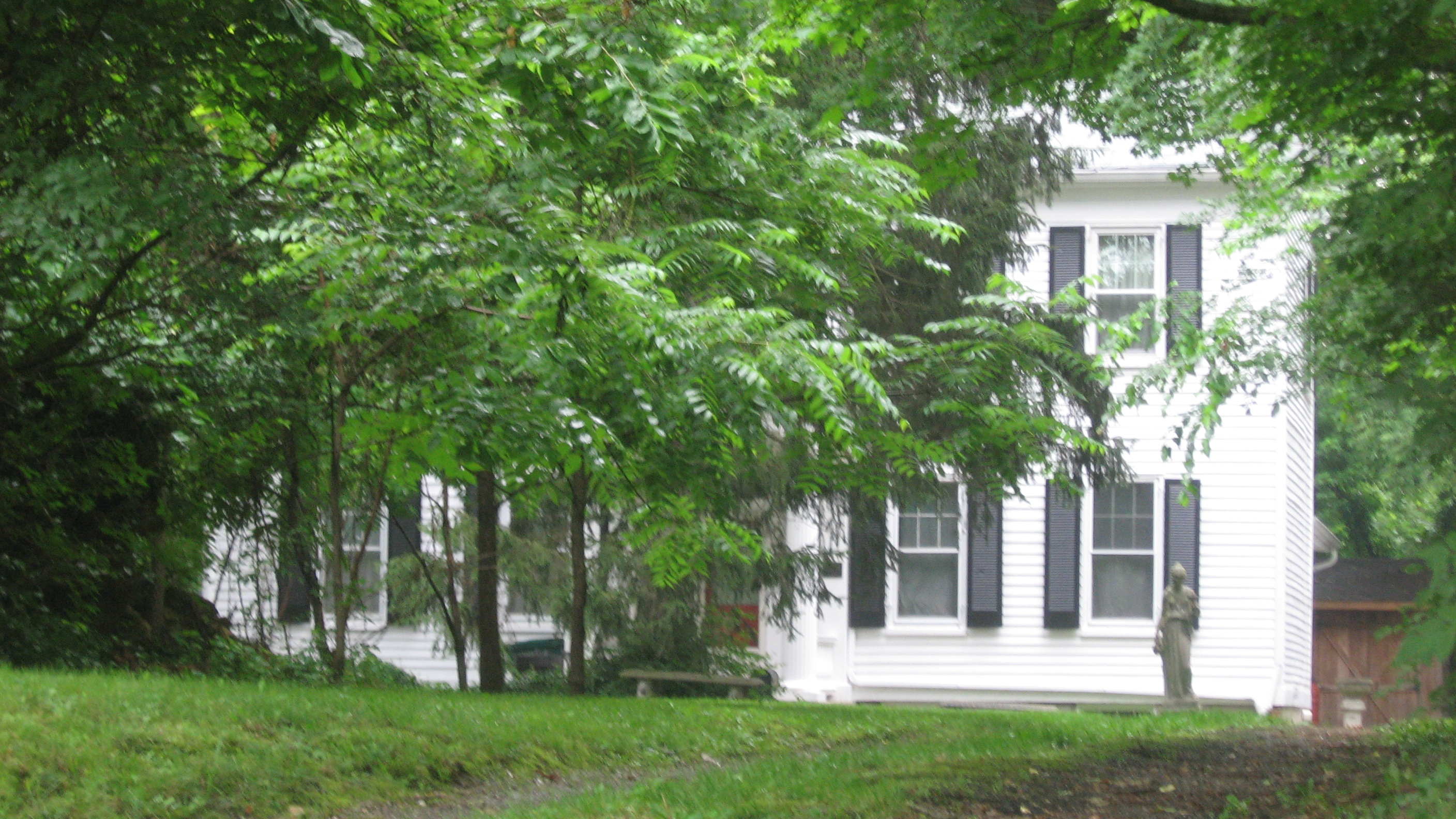
- Front of the house

- Location within Ohio Location within the United States
- Location: 4416 Homer Ave., Cincinnati, Ohio
- Coordinates: 39°9′6″N 84°23′18″W
- Area: Less than 1 acre (0.40 ha)
- Built: 1815
- Architectural style: Greek Revival
- NRHP reference No.: 82003576
- Added to NRHP: April 01, 1982

The Ayres L. Bramble House is a historic residence on the eastern side of Cincinnati, Ohio, United States. Built in the Greek Revival style of architecture in 1815, it is primarily a wooden building, featuring weatherboarded walls and other elements of wood. Two stories tall, the house features a Neoclassical entrance portico with fluted columns in the Doric order. Although built in the vernacular plan of an I-house, it features many other Greek Revival elements, such as the decorative molding and ornate plaster casts.

Ayres Bramble himself was a large-scale hog farmer; his operation was significant enough that it attracted notice in many different periodicals of the day. Besides raising hogs, Bramble eventually entered the business of killing them: he opened a slaughterhouse in Plainville that processed more than 36,000 animals in only one year. In Bramble's day, Cincinnati was known as "Porkopolis" due to its place as the leading center of pork packing in the United States; his operation was smaller than some in the city, but it was larger than any other slaughterhouse in the remnant portions of Hamilton County.

In 1982, the Ayres L. Bramble House was listed on the National Register of Historic Places, both because of its historically significant architecture and its place as the home of a leading local citizen.
