= Houston House =

Historic house in Ohio, United States

- U.S. National Register of Historic Places
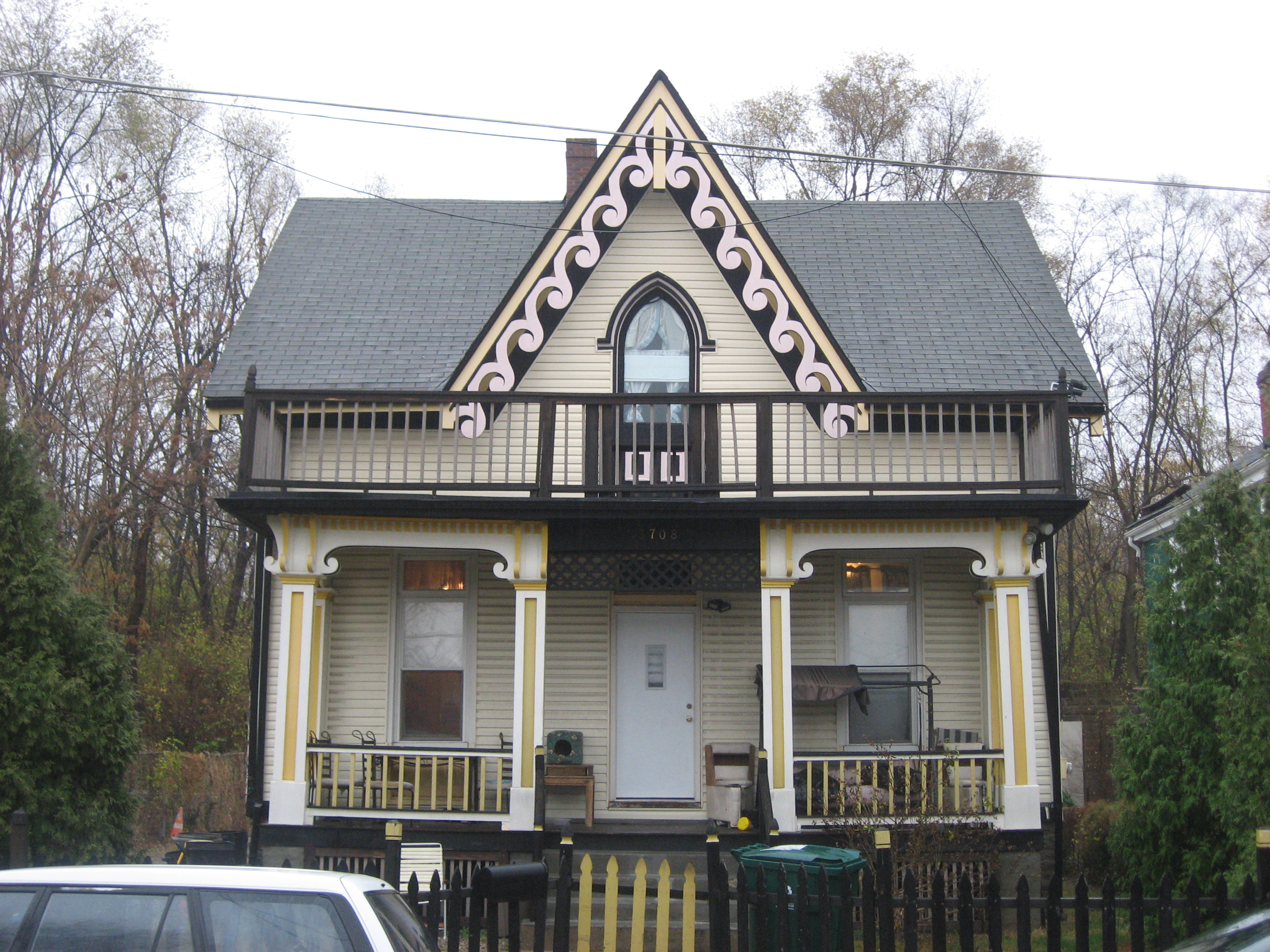
- Front of the house

- Location within Ohio Location within the United States
- Location: 3708 Mead Ave., Cincinnati, Ohio
- Coordinates: 39°6′46″N 84°26′18″W
- Area: 0 acres (0 ha)
- Built: 1900
- Architectural style: Carpenter Gothic
- MPS: Columbia-Tusculum MRA
- NRHP reference No.: 79002704
- Added to NRHP: August 24, 1979

The Houston House, built in 1900, is an historic Carpenter Gothic style house located at 3708 Mead Avenue in Cincinnati, Ohio. On August 24, 1979, it was listed in the National Register of Historic Places.
