= Captain Stone House =

Historic house in Ohio, United States

- Capt. Stone House
- U.S. National Register of Historic Places
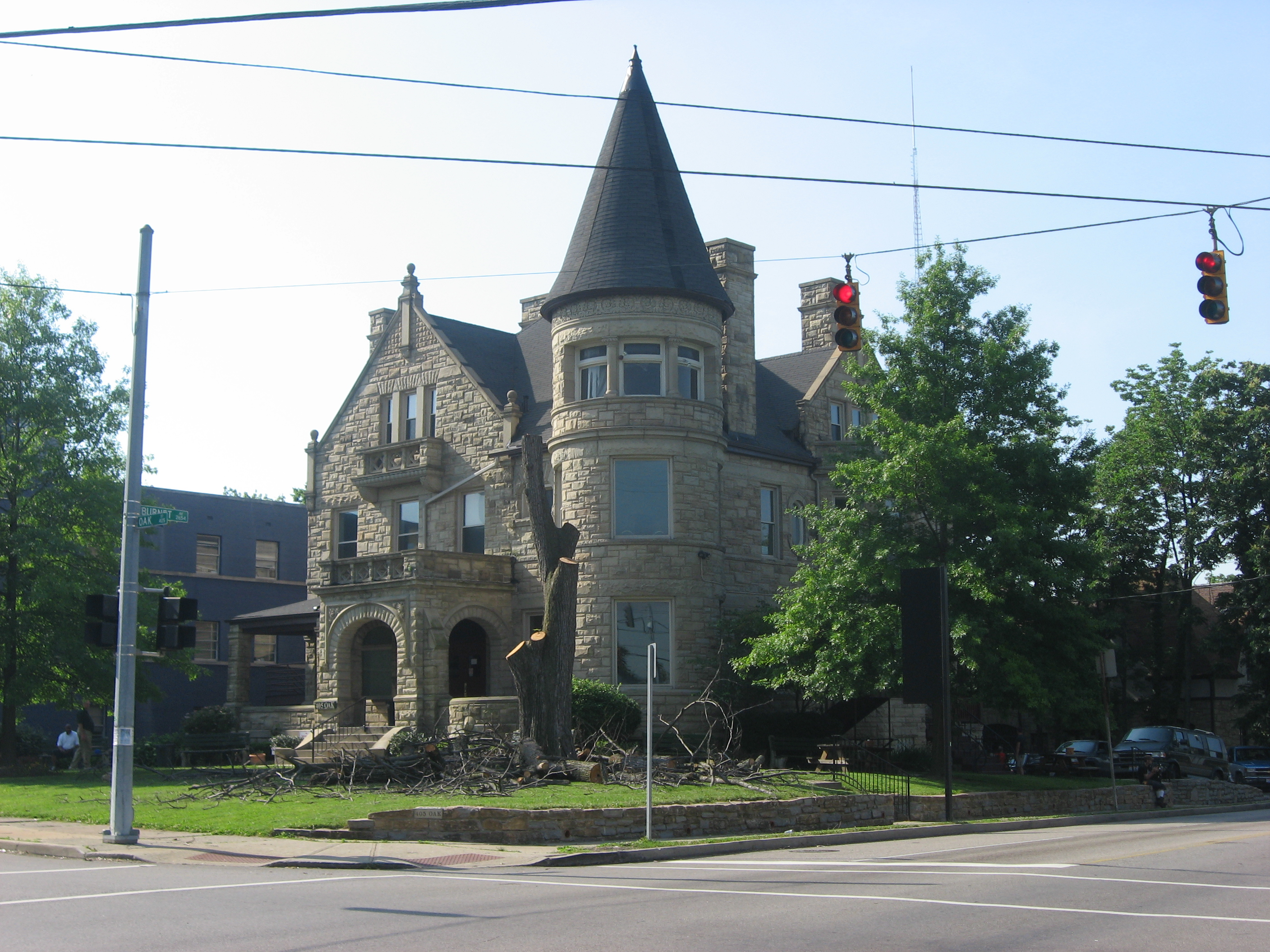
- Front of the house

- Location within Ohio Location within the United States
- Location: 405 Oak St., Cincinnati, Ohio
- Coordinates: 39°7′51″N 84°30′5″W
- Area: less than one acre
- Built: 1890
- Architect: Samuel Hannaford & Sons
- Architectural style: Romanesque Revival
- MPS: Samuel Hannaford and Sons TR in Hamilton County
- NRHP reference No.: 80003041
- Added to NRHP: March 3, 1980

The Captain Stone House is a historic house in Cincinnati, Ohio, United States. A Romanesque Revival structure built in 1890, it was designed by Samuel Hannaford and Sons for leading Cincinnati citizen George N. Stone and his wife Martha E. Stone, who was a survivor of the sinking of the Titanic, and their two daughters. A native of New Hampshire who served as an officer in the U.S. Army during the Civil War, Stone moved to Cincinnati after the war and became a leading businessman. After Stone's lifetime, the house became a center for a Cincinnati chapter of Alcoholics Anonymous, which continues to host meetings at the property.

Located on a corner lot, Hannaford's design features such distinctive elements as a round turret at the house's most prominent corner and a large gable on the house's front. Built with an asymmetrical floor plan, two-and-a-half stories tall, it is built of limestone with a stone foundation and an asbestos roof. The walls are built primarily of large ashlar blocks that form massive lintels, as well as smaller blocks that compose lug sills and string courses. Individuals may enter the house through a Romanesque entryway, which is accessed by a large front porch.

Stone's house was typical of the Hannaford style; four other Hannaford houses from the same period of time remain in Cincinnati, and all five buildings feature walls of coursed ashlar. By the late nineteenth century, Hannaford's name was well known both in Cincinnati and elsewhere; he had produced the grand Music Hall in the 1870s, and many of the city's richest residents commissioned houses from him in the city's most prestigious neighborhoods. Dozens of nineteenth-century Hannaford designs remain in Cincinnati, including twenty houses; many of them have been deemed worthy of historic preservation because of their distinctive architecture. Among these houses is the Stone House, which was listed on the National Register of Historic Places in 1980, due to architecture that makes it important statewide, along with most of Hannaford's remaining buildings in Cincinnati.
