= General Hospital Nurses' Home =

- U.S. National Register of Historic Places
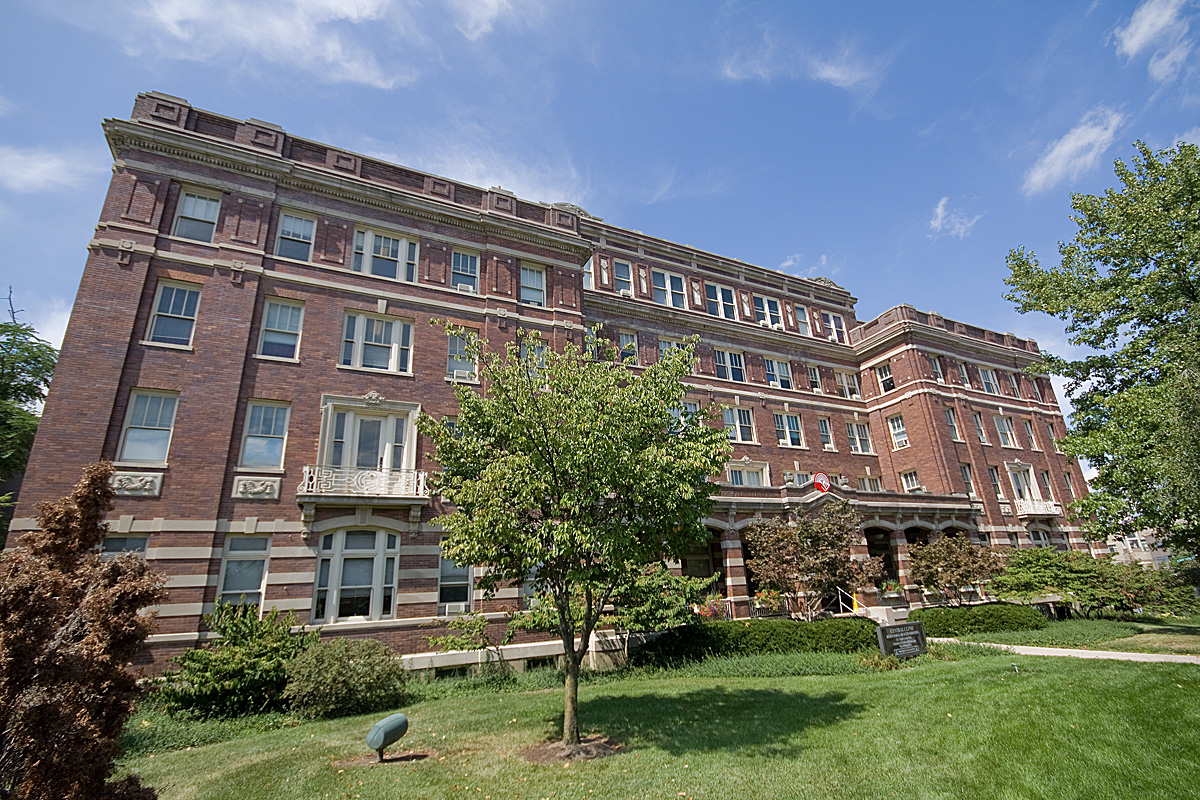
- Location: Cincinnati, Ohio
- Coordinates: 39°8′21.58″N 84°30′9.27″W
- Architect: Samuel Hannaford & Sons
- Architectural style: Renaissance
- NRHP reference No.: 05000581
- Added to NRHP: June 10, 2005

General Hospital Nurses' Home is a registered historic building in Cincinnati, Ohio, listed in the National Register on June 10, 2005.

== Historic uses ==
- Institutional Housing

== See also ==
- University of Cincinnati Academic Health Center § History
