= Bernard Ratterman House =

Historic house in Ohio, United States

- U.S. National Register of Historic Places
- U.S. Historic district – Contributing property
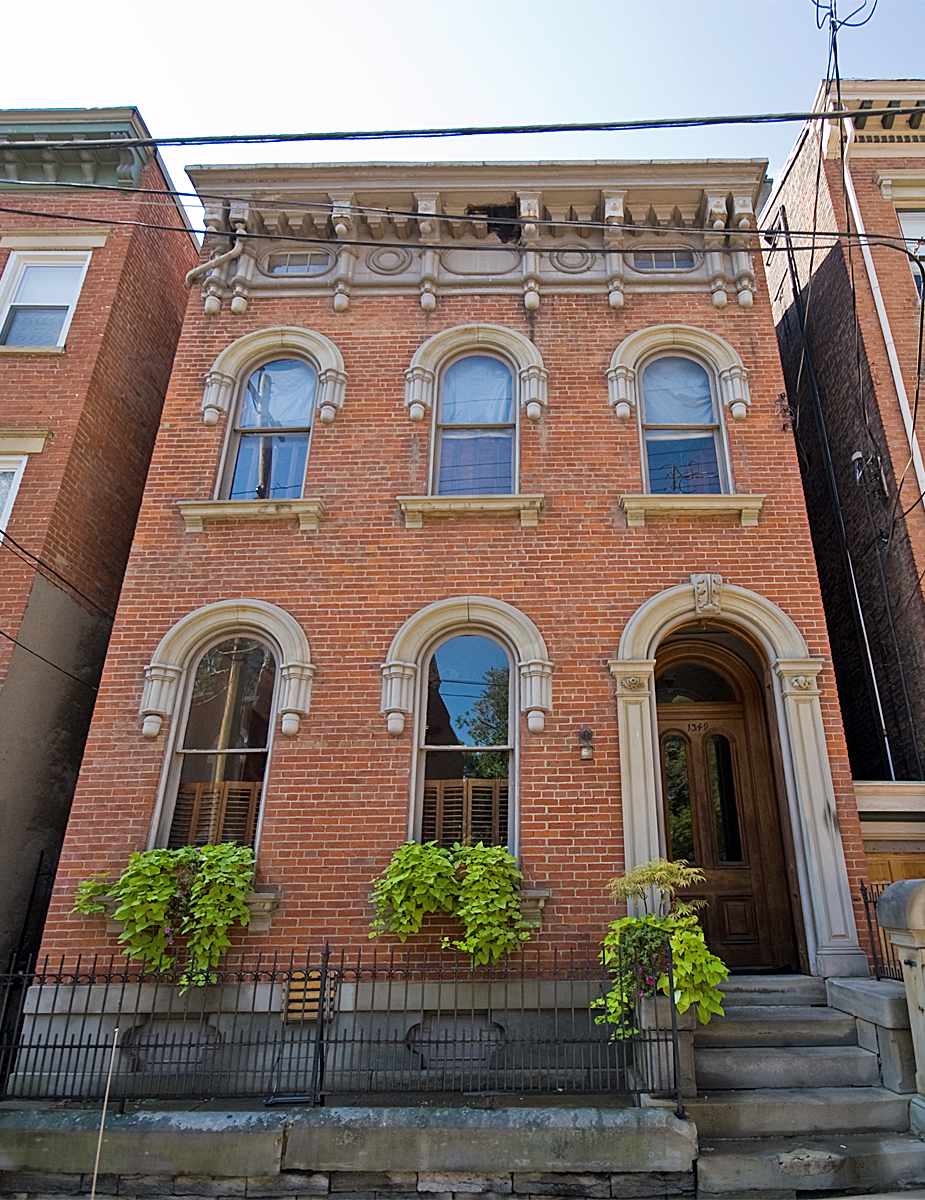
- Front of the house

- Location within Ohio Location within the United States
- Location: 1349 Broadway, Cincinnati, Ohio
- Coordinates: 39°6′43″N 84°30′32″W
- Area: less than one acre
- Built: 1865
- Architectural style: Italianate
- Part of: Over-the-Rhine Historic District (ID83001985)
- NRHP reference No.: 82003584
- Added to NRHP: September 30, 1982

The Bernard Ratterman House is a historic house in the Over-the-Rhine neighborhood of Cincinnati, Ohio, United States. Constructed in the middle of the nineteenth century to a design by an unknown architect, it has been named one of the neighborhood's best examples of Italianate architecture. Built of brick with sandstone and iron elements, it includes features such as an ornate cornice, stone window trim, lug sills with brackets, and rare details such as crafted acorns.

Bernard Ratterman, the original resident, was a white-collar worker; after the house was completed in 1865, he and his family resided in it for several years, during which time he floated among various jobs. Since his family's departure from the house, it has been well-maintained; the house's well-preserved architecture qualified it for addition to the National Register of Historic Places in 1982. As well, the Ratterman House is a contributing property to the Over-the-Rhine Historic District, which was designated a historic district and added to the National Register in 1983.
