= La Tosca Flats =

- U.S. National Register of Historic Places
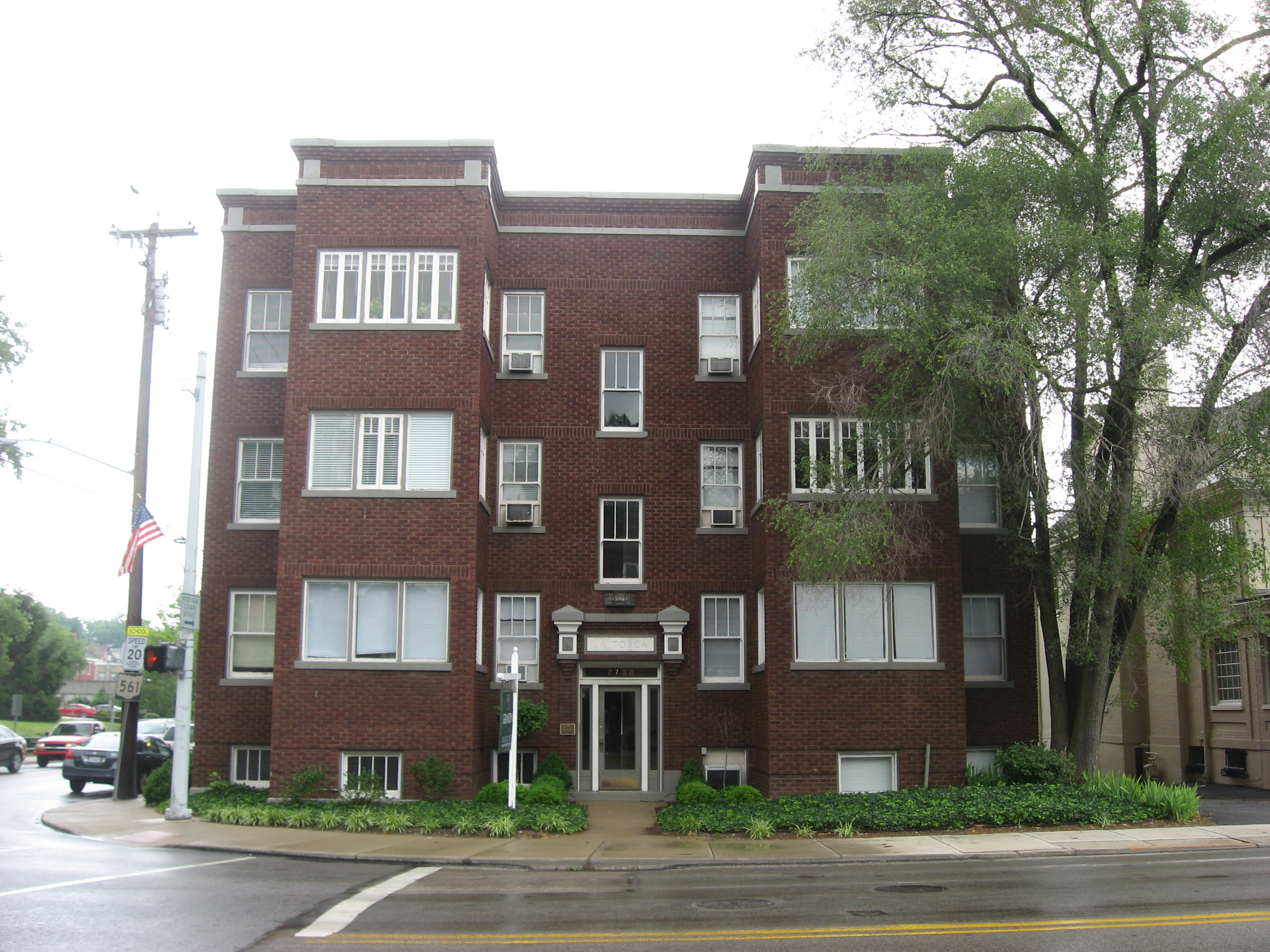
- Front of the building
- Location: Cincinnati, Ohio
- Coordinates: 39°8′15.23″N 84°26′35.98″W
- Architect: Alfred E. Andersen
- Architectural style: Craftsman
- NRHP reference No.: 99000096
- Added to NRHP: February 5, 1999

La Tosca Flats is a registered historic building in Cincinnati, Ohio, listed in the National Register on February 5, 1999.

== Historic uses ==
- Multiple Dwelling
