= John Henry Weston House =

Historic house in Ohio, United States

- U.S. National Register of Historic Places
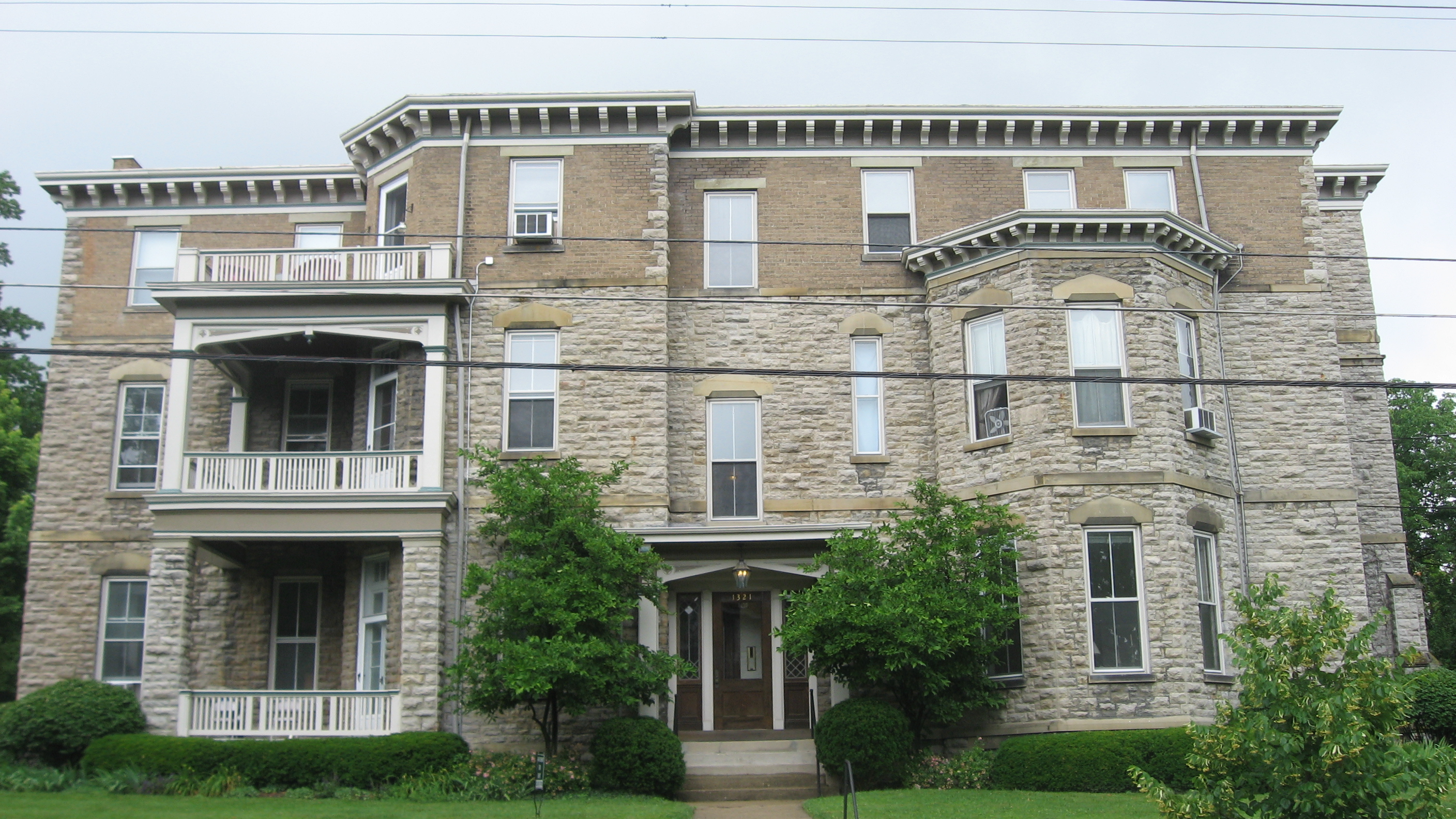
- Front of the house

- Location within Ohio Location within the United States
- Location: 1321 Michigan Avenue, Cincinnati, Ohio
- Coordinates: 39°8′8.66″N 84°26′31.42″W
- Architectural style: Gothic Revival and Italianate
- NRHP reference No.: 02000218
- Added to NRHP: March 20, 2002

John Henry Weston House is a registered historic building in Cincinnati, Ohio, listed in the National Register on March 20, 2002.

== Historic uses ==
- Single Dwelling
- Multiple Dwelling
