= Hoodin Building =

- U.S. National Register of Historic Places
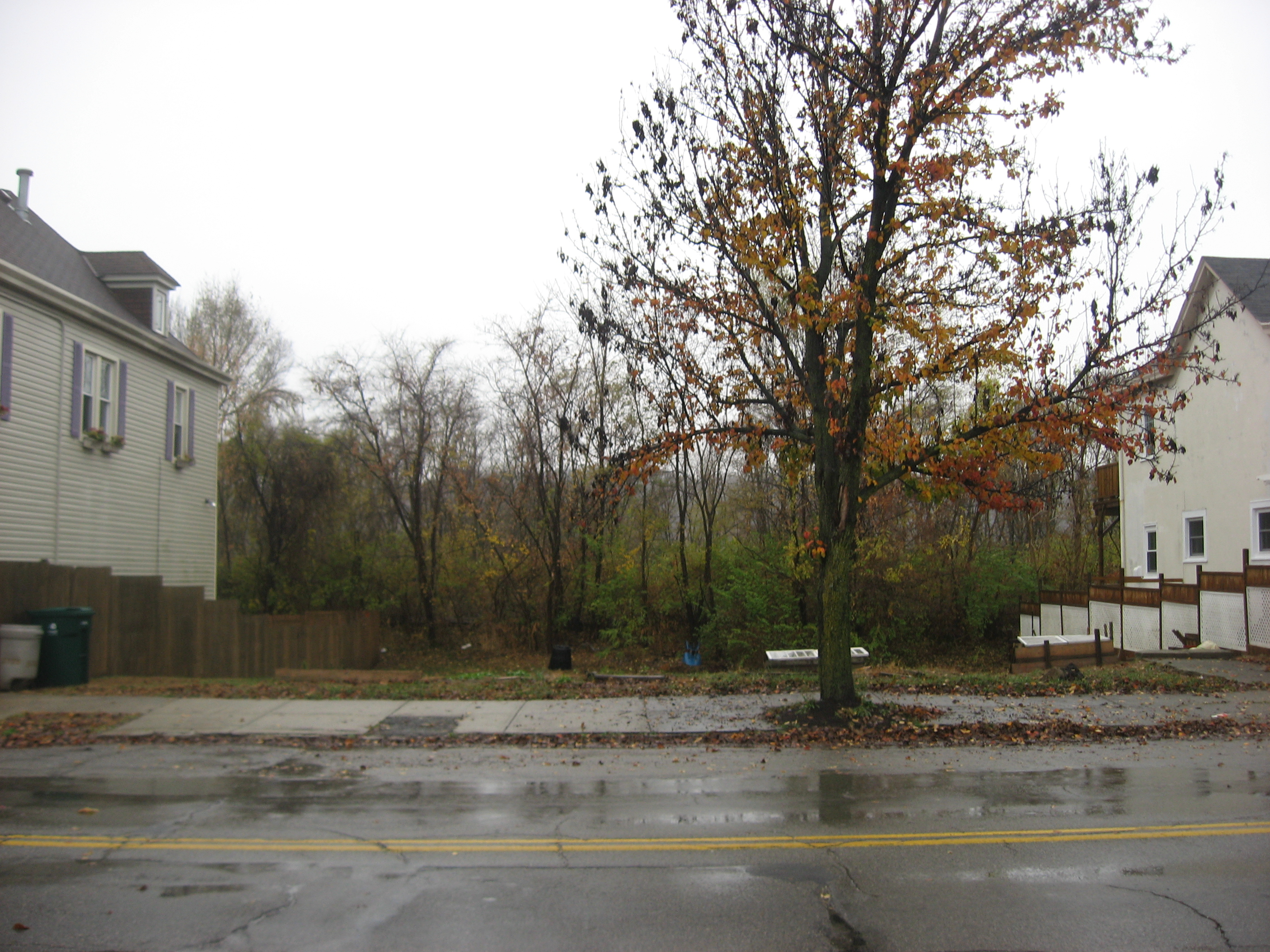
- Site of the Hoodin Building

- Location within Ohio Location within the United States
- Location: 3719-3725 Eastern Ave., Cincinnati, Ohio
- Coordinates: 39°6′41″N 84°26′9″W
- Area: Less than 1 acre (0.40 ha)
- Built: 1881
- Architectural style: Italianate
- MPS: Columbia-Tusculum MRA
- NRHP reference No.: 79002708
- Added to NRHP: August 24, 1979

The Hoodin Building was a historic apartment building in the Columbia-Tusculum neighborhood of Cincinnati, Ohio, United States. Built in 1881, it was once one of the neighborhood's most prestigious addresses. Despite its designation as a historic site, it is no longer standing.

Former exterior; note the double entrances

Measuring two-and-a-half stories tall, the Hoodin Building was an Italianate structure with weatherboarded walls and a foundation of fieldstone. A raised basement necessitated the construction of wooden stairways to permit access to the building's front porches, both of which were heavily ornamented. Besides the porches, the building featured such details as a cornice with brackets, a symmetrical facade, and pedimented lintels above the windows of the second story. For this reason, a 1978 historic preservation survey found the building distinctive enough for special mention.

In 1979, the Hoodin Building was listed on the National Register of Historic Places due to its historically significant architecture, which was deemed to be in excellent condition. It was one of seventeen Columbia-Tusculum properties included in a multiple property submission related to the previous year's historic preservation survey; most of the properties were buildings, but the Columbia Baptist and Fulton-Presbyterian Cemeteries were also included. Despite this distinction, the Hoodin has been demolished; the site is now an empty lot. Nevertheless, the building remains listed on the National Register.
