= Pfleger Family Houses =

Historic houses in Ohio, United States

- U.S. National Register of Historic Places
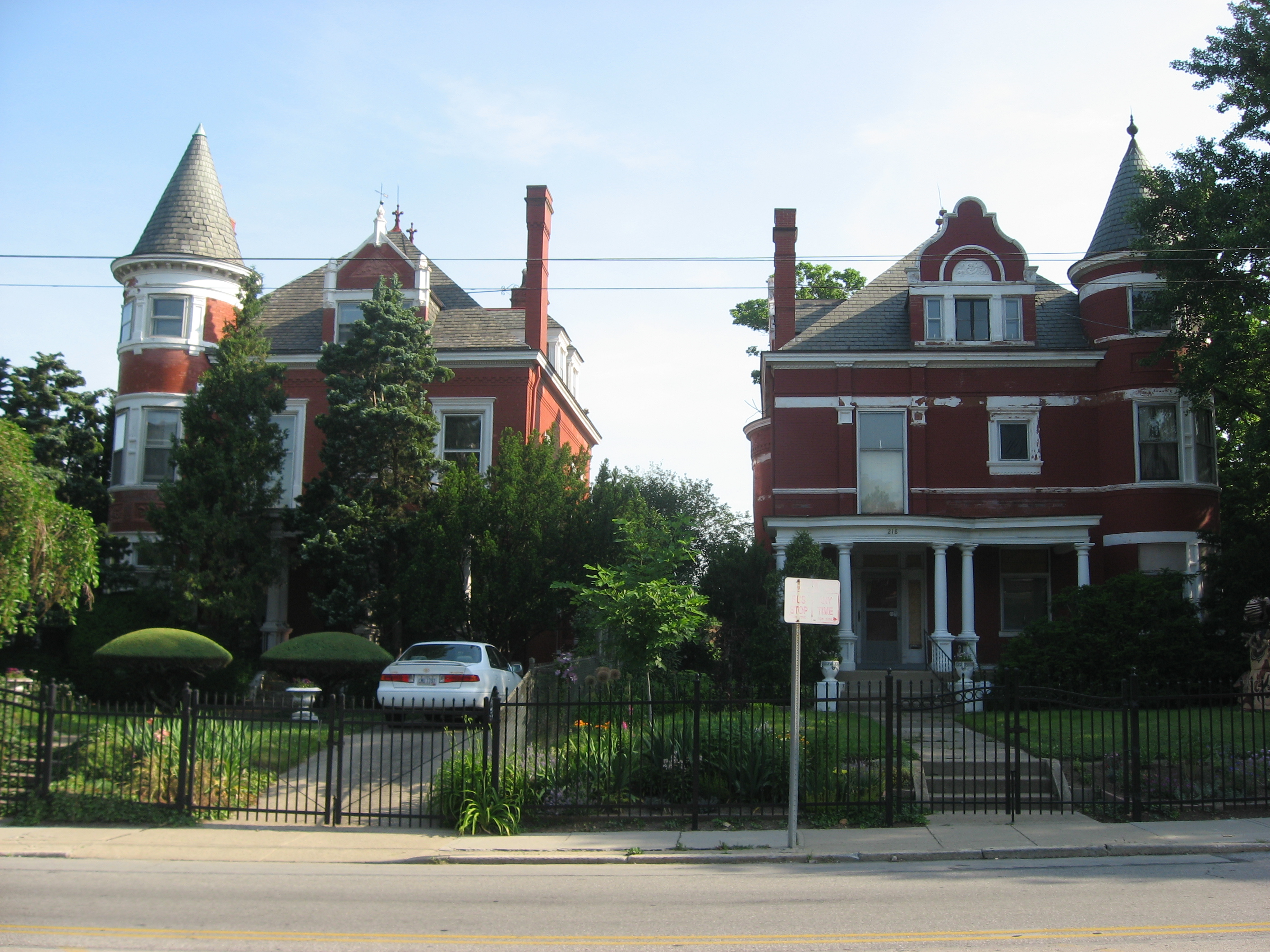
- Streetside view of the houses

- Location within Ohio Location within the United States
- Location: 216 and 218 Erkenbrecker Ave., Cincinnati, Ohio
- Coordinates: 39°8′32″N 84°30′20″W
- Area: 0.5 acres (0.20 ha)
- Built: 1897
- Architect: Julius Pfleger
- Architectural style: Queen Anne
- NRHP reference No.: 80003072
- Added to NRHP: March 11, 1980

The Pfleger Family Houses are a pair of adjacent historic residences in Cincinnati, Ohio, United States. Built in the Queen Anne style in the late nineteenth century, they were the homes of multiple members of the locally prominent Pfleger family. An immigrant from Germany, Julius Pfleger built the two houses; with his wife Catharine, he inhabited the western house, while the eastern house was the home of their son Edward and his family.

The Pfleger family gained prominence in Cincinnati's business community because of their place in the shoe industry. As president of Guiss, Pfleger, and Company, Julius oversaw a firm that sold both shoes and other leather products, and his position was inherited by Edward after the former's death.

Both houses have been seen as historically significant because of their status as examples of the period's transition between architectural styles: although both were clearly built in the Queen Anne style, they bear influences of the Neoclassical style that succeeded the Queen Anne as the premier style of the day. Built of brick with stone foundations, the houses feature such distinctive architectural elements as circular turrets, prominent porches, and Neoclassical fenestration. Contributing to their unique status is their method of construction: while adjacent houses were frequently built by the same contractors, it is very rare for adjacent houses to be constructed intentionally as a pair, as were the Pfleger houses.

Early in 1980, the Pfleger Family Houses were listed together on the National Register of Historic Places, qualifying because of their well-preserved historic architecture.
