= Pilgrim (disambiguation) =

A pilgrim is one who undertakes a religious journey or pilgrimage.

Pilgrim(s) or The Pilgrim(s) may also refer to:

== Arts and entertainment ==
=== Film and television ===
- Pilgrim (film), 2000, starring Ray Liotta
- Pilgrim (Arrowverse), a character from the American television series Legends of Tomorrow
- "Pilgrim" (Into the Dark), an episode of the first season of Into the Dark
- Pilgrims (film), a 2021 crime film by Laurynas Bareisa
- Pilgrims, a fictional ethnic group in the film Wing Commander
- The Pilgrim (1923 film), a silent film by Charlie Chaplin
- The Pilgrim (2014 film), a biographical film about Paulo Coelho
- "The Pilgrim" (Law & Order: Criminal Intent), a television episode
- The Pilgrims (1924 film), a 1924 film by Edwin L. Hollywood
- The Pilgrims (2009 film), a 2009 film by Pilgrim Pictures
- "Pilgrims" (Britain's Lost Routes with Griff Rhys Jones), a documentary episode

=== Music ===
==== Performers ====
- Pilgrims (band), a Spanish funk-rock band
- The Pilgrims (band), an American alternative rock band
- Pilgrim, a jazz combo fronted by saxophonist Christoph Irniger

==== Albums ====
- Pilgrim (Eric Clapton album), 1998
- The Pilgrim (Shaun Davey album), 1983
- The Pilgrim (Marty Stuart album), 1999
- The Pilgrim (Owen Campbell album), 2013
- Pilgrim, by Barry McGuire, 1989
- Pilgrim, by Ruthie Henshall
- The Pilgrim, by Joey Molland, 1992
- The Pilgrim, by Larry Gatlin, 1973

==== Songs ====
- "Pilgrim" (Eric Clapton song), 1998
- "Pilgrim" (MØ song), 2013
- "Pilgrim", by Uriah Heep from Sweet Freedom, 1973
- "Pilgrim", by Scott Walker from Bish Bosch, 2012
- "Pilgrim", by Steve Earle from The Mountain, 1999
- "Pilgrims", by Widespread Panic from Everyday, 1993
- "The Pilgrim", by Iron Maiden from A Matter of Life and Death, 2006
- "The Pilgrim", by Sam Roberts from Love at the End of the World, 2008
- "The Pilgrim", by Wishbone Ash from Pilgrimage, 1971
- "The Pilgrim, Chapter 33", by Kris Kristofferson from The Silver Tongued Devil and I, 1971
- "Pilgrim", by Jesse Welles from "Pilgrim", 2025

=== Literature ===
- Pilgrim (Douglass novel) (1998)
- Pilgrim (Findley novel) (1999)
- Pilgrims (short story collection), by Elizabeth Gilbert
- The Pilgrim, a periodical begun in 1870 associated with the Old Brethren
- The Pilgrim, a 2010 two-issue comic book limited series published by IDW Publishing
- Billy Pilgrim, a fictional character in Kurt Vonnegut's 1969 novel Slaughterhouse-Five
- Scott Pilgrim, a fictional character in Bryan Lee O'Malley's graphic novel series
- Pilgrim, a fictional ship in the novel Dick Sand, A Captain at Fifteen

=== Other uses in arts and entertainment ===
- The Pilgrim (Marini), a 1939 bronze sculpture by Marino Marini
- The Pilgrim, a painting by René Magritte
- The Pilgrim (play), 1621, by John Fletcher
- Pilgrim (Baczkiewicz), a series of radio dramas written by Sebastian Baczkiewicz
- The Pilgrim (statue), a 1885 bronze statue by John Quincy Adams Ward
- Pilgrim (video game), a 1986 text adventure
- Pilgrims (video game), a 2019 point-and-click adventure
- Pilgrim: Faith as a Weapon, a 1997 point-and-click adventure

== Churches ==
- Pilgrim Baptist Church, Chicago, Illinois, US
- Pilgrim Baptist Church (Saint Paul, Minnesota), US
- Pilgrim Congregational Church (disambiguation)
- Pilgrim Presbyterian Church, Cincinnati, Ohio, US

== Media companies ==
- Pilgrim Pictures, two 20th-century film production companies
- Pilgrim Media Group, an American television production company
- Pilgrim Radio, a network of radio stations broadcasting a Christian Radio format, covering parts of the Western US

== Schools ==
=== United States ===
- The Pilgrim Academy, Egg Harbor City, New Jersey
- Pilgrim High School, Warwick, Rhode Island
- Pilgrim Lutheran School, Chicago, Illinois
- Pilgrim Bible College and Central Pilgrim College, now Oklahoma Wesleyan University

=== Elsewhere ===
- Pilgrim Theological College, Australia
- The Pilgrims' School, a boys' preparatory school and cathedral school in Winchester, Hampshire, England Winchester, Hampshire, England

== Sports ==
=== Football ===
- Pilgrims F.C., a London-based side which entered the FA Cup during the 1870s and 1880s
- The Pilgrims F.C., an early 1900s touring side, which twice visited the US
- Pilgrims F.C., an American side that competed in the 1923–24 National Challenge Cup
- Boston United F.C., an English football club nicknamed "The Pilgrims"
- Plymouth Argyle F.C., an English football club nicknamed "The Pilgrims"

=== Other sports ===
- Boston Red Sox baseball team (early nickname "Pilgrims")
- Pilgrim Lacrosse League, a former NCAA Division III men's college lacrosse conference in Massachusetts, US
- Pilgrim Stakes, a Thoroughbred horserace run annually at Belmont Park, Elmont, New York, US

== People ==
- Pilgrim (surname)
- Pilgrim (given name)
- Pilgrims (Plymouth Colony), English settlers who came to North America on the Mayflower
- Canterbury Pilgrims, English colonists who arrived in Canterbury, New Zealand, on one of the First Four Ships
- The Pilgrim, a pen name of Australian journalist Theodore Argles (c. 1851–1886)
- List of people known as the Pilgrim

== Places in the United States ==
- Pilgrim, Kentucky, an unincorporated community
- Pilgrim, Michigan, an unincorporated community and census-designated place
- Pilgrim River, Michigan
- Pilgrim Township, Dade County, Missouri
- Pilgrim, Texas, an unincorporated community
- Kruzgamepa River, Alaska, also known as the Pilgrim River

== Aircraft ==
- Fairchild 100 Pilgrim, a 1930s American monoplane transport
- Pilgrim 100-B N709Y, one of a few surviving aircraft from the early days of aviation in Alaska, built in 1932
- Pilgrim, a Goodyear Blimp from 1925
- General Aviation GA-43, also known as the Pilgrim 150, an American single-engine monoplane airliner first flown in 1932

== Ships ==
- Pilgrim (brig), an American sailing brig, setting for Richard Henry Dana Jr.'s book Two Years Before the Mast, and a modern replica
- USS Pilgrim (1864), a canal boat purchased to be sunk as a blockship in 1864
- USS Pilgrim (tugboat), in commission from 1870 to 1871
- USS Pilgrim (SP-1204), a patrol vessel in commission from 1917 to 1919
- USS Pilgrim II (YFB-30), a river patrol boat commissioned in 1942 and stricken in 1947

== Other uses ==
- Pilgrim (sandwich), an American sandwich
- Rosa 'The Pilgrim', a shrub rose cultivar
- Pilgrim Psychiatric Center, Brentwood, New York, US, a state-run psychiatric hospital
- Pilgrim Hospital, Lincolnshire, England
- Pilgrim Award, an award presented for Lifetime Achievement in the field of science fiction scholarship
- Pilgrim (automobile), two 1910s American car marques
- Pilgrim Tercentenary half dollar, struck by the US Mint in 1920 and 1921
- Operation Pilgrim, a British Second World War planned but never implemented operation to seize the Canary Islands
- Pilgrim Nuclear Power Station, Massachusetts, US
- Pilgrim Pipeline, a planned but never built pipeline from Albany, New York, to Linden, New Jersey, US
- Pilgrims Society, a British-American organization
- Pilgrim Trust, a national, charitable, grant-making trust in the UK
- Château Pèlerin, also known as Pilgrim Castle, a Crusader fortress on the coast of what is now Israel
- Pilgrim Formation, a geologic formation in Montana, US

== See also ==
- Pilgrimage (disambiguation)
- Piligrim (died 991), Bishop of Passau
