= Pilgrim (surname) =

Pilgrim is an English and German surname. Notable people with the surname include:

- Agnes Baker Pilgrim (1924–2019), American Native American spiritual elder
- Darryl Pilgrim, English professional darts player
- Chris Pilgrim (born 1986), English rugby player
- Eva Pilgrim (born 1982), American news reporter and anchor
- Guy Ellcock Pilgrim (1875–1943), British geologist and paleontologist
- Hubertus von Pilgrim (1931–2026), German sculptor
- Jane Pilgrim, English trade union organiser
- Janet Pilgrim (British Army officer) (born c.1966), British nurse
- Janet Pilgrim (model) (1934–2017), American model
- Jim Pilgrim (1874–1939), English footballer
- Leroy Pilgrim (died 2004), Belizean shooting victim
- Mark Pilgrim (born 1972), American software developer
- Mark Pilgrim (presenter) (1969–2023), South African radio and television presenter
- Paul Pilgrim (1883–1958), American runner
- Peace Pilgrim (1908–1981), American pacifist
- Steve Pilgrim (rugby) (born 1967), English rugby player

== See also ==
- Scott Pilgrim, title character in the series of graphic novels, a film and a video game
