= Ormsby M. Mitchel =

Union Army general (1810–1862)

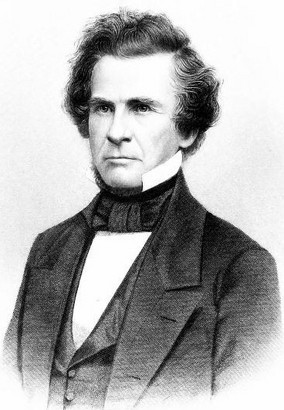
- Born: August 28, 1810; Union County, Kentucky
- Died: October 31, 1862 (aged 52); Beaufort, South Carolina
- Burial place: Green-Wood Cemetery Brooklyn, New York
- Military career
- Allegiance: United States of America; Union
- Branch: United States Army; Union Army
- Service years: 1829–1832; 1861–1862
- Rank: Major General
- Nickname: Old Stars
- Commands: Department of the Ohio; X Corps; Department of the South
- Conflicts: American Civil War; Great Locomotive Chase
- Other work: Astronomer

Ormsby MacKnight (or McKnight) Mitchel (August 28, 1810, or possibly 1809, – October 31, 1862) was an American astronomer, polymath, and major general in the American Civil War.

He is known for publishing the first astronomy magazine in the United States. He is also known for ordering the raid that came into prominence as the Great Locomotive Chase during the American Civil War.

== Early life and career ==
Mitchel was born in Union County, Kentucky, but grew up in Lebanon, Ohio. He was educated in Lebanon, and afterward at West Point in 1825, where he was a classmate to Robert E. Lee and Joseph E. Johnston. He graduated in 1829, placing 15th out of 46 graduates. Mitchel stayed at West Point as assistant professor of mathematics for three years. After holding several military positions while studying law, he went to Cincinnati, passed the bar and became an attorney. He also filled the office of Chief Engineer of the Little Miami Railroad, then in the process of construction. Subsequently, in 1836, he became assistant professor of mathematics, philosophy, and professor of astronomy at Cincinnati College, and during this incumbency achieved a national renown as an astronomical lecturer and builder of the Cincinnati Observatory. He was instrumental in establishing the college's law school, and on his first vacation, surveyed and recommended the route of the planned Little Miami Railroad between Cincinnati and Springfield, Ohio.

Conceiving a desire to possess a fine telescope, he began by striving to awaken interest in the subject of astronomy through a series of lectures. The first was heard by 16 people; but the last was listened to by an enraptured audience of 2,000. Availing himself of the enthusiasm thus generated, he organized the Cincinnati Astronomical Society with 300 members at $25 each, and started for Europe to find his telescope. His search was long, but successful and, returning, he plunged into the struggle to secure a suitable observatory. In Nicholas Longworth he found a helpful coadjutor. Upon the land which was donated by Longworth, located on the summit of Mt. Adams. Mitchel began the foundation of his building and John Quincy Adams, then more than 77 years of age, delivered an address at the laying of the cornerstone.

At this period of undertaking, he had collected $3,000, and $6,500 necessary to complete his work. The subscriptions came in slowly and hence he collected them in person. Where money could not be procured, he took provisions that had negotiable value, which he marketed and turned into cash. Many of his subscriptions being in work and materials no collectors would accept them as his assets and he undertook to make them available by buying all the materials, hiring all the men and superintending all the work. The ascent to the place of construction was steep. Therefore, he built a kiln and burned the lime; he purchased a sand pit also and often shoveled its contents into the wagon with his own hands.

He carried on with his classes, however, teaching five hours a day from eight until one. Each Saturday exhausted his funds and on Monday he had to begin collecting again. The construction was completed in March 1845, and he hoisted his telescope into place. At the time, it was the second-largest refracting telescope in the world. There was no salary attached to the office of astronomer in this new observatory and Mitchel supported himself by civil engineering on the route of the Ohio & Mississippi Railroad (Ohio and Mississippi Railway) and by lecturing anywhere and everywhere. In 1853, he was elected as a member of the American Philosophical Society.

For a time, Cincinnati lost his inspirational presence. In 1859, Mitchel accepted the position of astronomer of the Dudley Observatory in Albany, New York, a position which he held until 1861, where he continued his pioneering work on the development of telegraphic determination of longitude. Although, he did not wholly relinquish a connection with the one he had built in Cincinnati.

He published, in 1846, the first monthly magazine in the United States devoted specifically to astronomy, the Sidereal Messenger, and other works including The Orbs of Heaven (1848 and later), and Popular Astronomy (1860).

When the American Civil War broke out, Mitchel turned soldier. He happened to be in New York when the news of the Battle of Fort Sumter came and, being asked to speak at a public meeting, gave an address, which along with his previous record, procured for Mitchel a high position in the Army and his second tour as a soldier began.

== Civil War ==
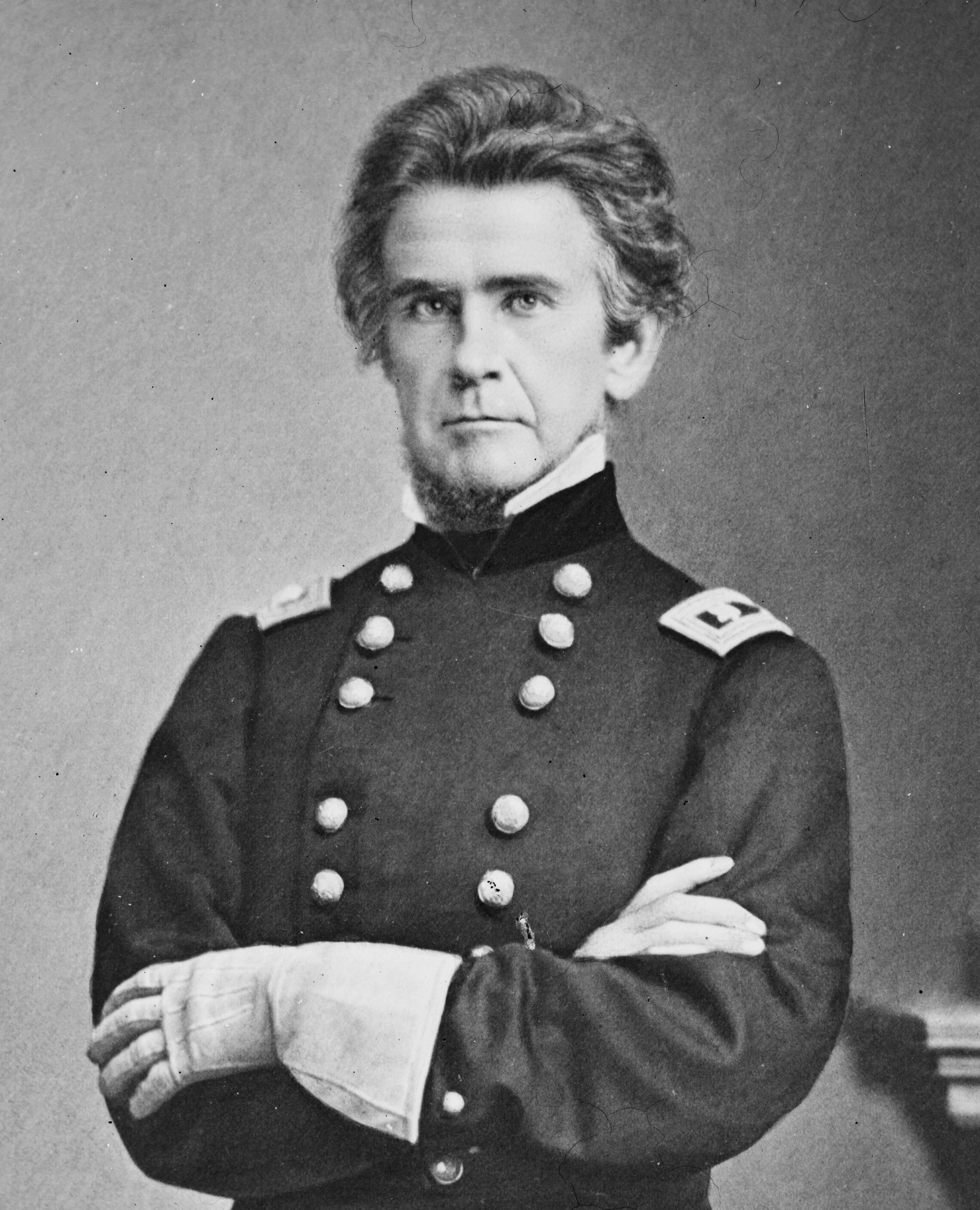
Ormsby Mitchel

During the American Civil War, he entered the Union Army with a commission as brigadier general of volunteers. He first organized the northern Kentucky defenses around Cincinnati. He commanded the Department of the Ohio from September to November 1861. During this time, he conspired with espionage agent James J. Andrews on plans to steal a train in Georgia and disrupt a railroad vital to the Confederate States Army coincident with Mitchel's planned attack on Chattanooga, Tennessee. The raid failed, as did Mitchel's military operation. Andrews and a number of his men were captured. Andrews himself was among eight men who were tried in Chattanooga. They were hanged in Atlanta by Confederate forces, but were later buried in the National Cemetery at Chattanooga in 1887.

Although a military failure, the story of Andrew's Raid became known to American history as the Great Locomotive Chase, and has been retold in publications and film. The pursuit of Andrews' Raiders formed the basis of the Buster Keaton silent film The General and a dramatic 1956 Walt Disney film, The Great Locomotive Chase.

Mitchel led a division in the Army of the Ohio from December 1861 to July 1862, and was placed in charge of the defense of Nashville, Tennessee, with headquarters in the vicinity of Shelbyville, Tennessee. He seized the city of Huntsville, Alabama, in April 1862 without a shot being fired, after he led his troops there from Shelbyville in a surprise maneuver. He was promoted to major general for his efforts.

In September 1862, he assumed command of X Corps and the Department of the South at Hilton Head, South Carolina, but died in Beaufort of yellow fever shortly after assuming his post. He is buried in Green-Wood Cemetery in Brooklyn, New York.

== Legacy ==
- A persistently bright region near the Mars south pole that was first observed by Mitchel in 1846 is named in his honor – 'The Mountains of Mitchel'. It is located near 70°S, 40°E.
- An impact crater on Mars was named in his honor.
- The new town (and later city) of Mitchell, Indiana, was named for him after he surveyed it for the owners while working on the Ohio and Mississippi Railroad in the 1850s. (The second "L" was added later).
- The first post-Civil War freedmen's town created in the United States (on Hilton Head Island, South Carolina), Mitchelville, was named for him.
- Fort Mitchell, Kentucky — an aberrant spelling — was also named for him.
- A descendant and namesake, Lt. Ormsby M. Mitchel Jr., was awarded the Navy Cross in 1943 for extraordinary heroism in trying to save the crew of his doomed USS Plymouth after it had been struck by a torpedo fired by a German U-boat off the Virginia coast.

== See also ==
- List of American Civil War generals (Union)
