= Church of the Pilgrims =

Church of the Pilgrims may refer to:

- Church of the Pilgrims (Washington, D.C.)
- Church of the Pilgrims (Brooklyn, New York), co-founded by Henry Chandler Bowen

== See also ==
- Pilgrim (disambiguation)#Church related
