= Pilgrim Presbyterian Church =

- U.S. National Register of Historic Places
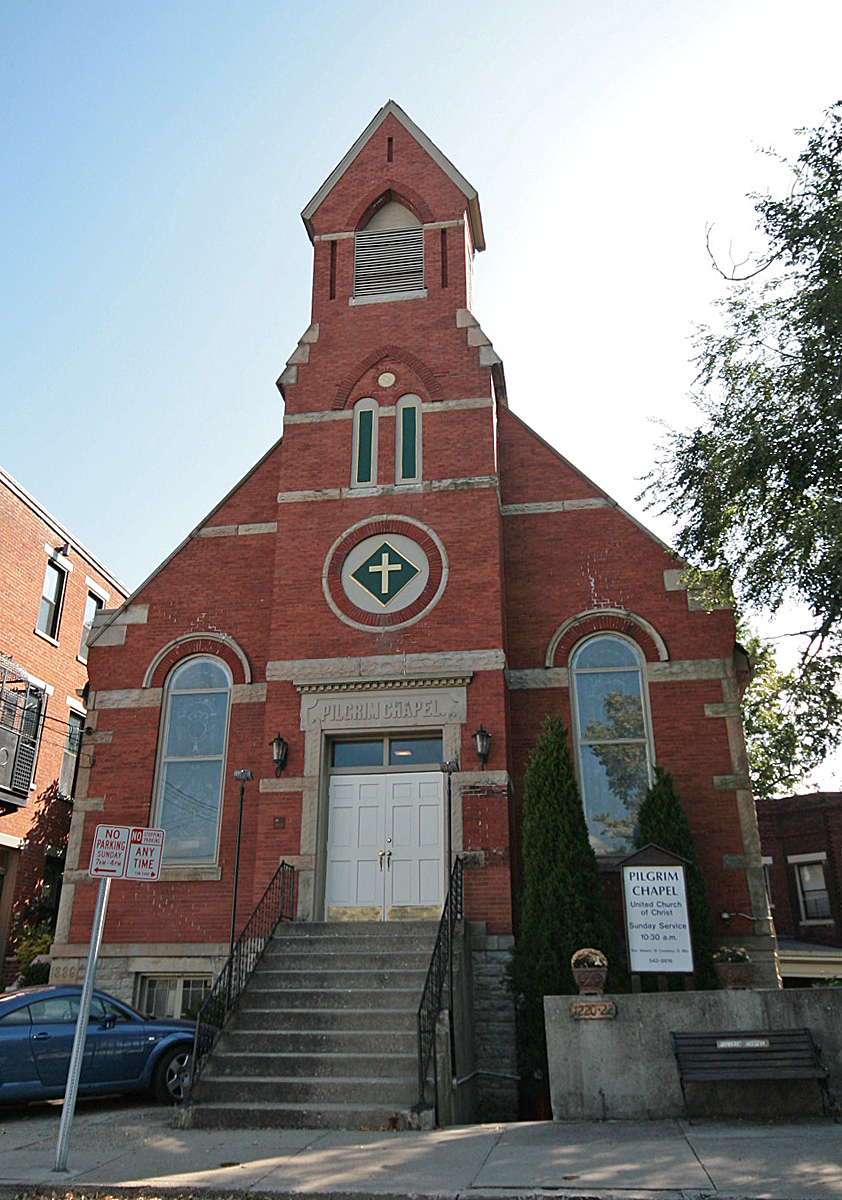
- Front of the church

- Location within Ohio Location within the United States
- Location: 1222 Ida St., Cincinnati, Ohio
- Coordinates: 39°6′36″N 84°29′56″W
- Area: less than one acre
- Built: 1886
- Architect: Charles E. Iliff
- Architectural style: Gothic Revival
- NRHP reference No.: 80003074
- Added to NRHP: July 18, 1980

Pilgrim Presbyterian Church is a historic church building in the Mount Adams neighborhood of Cincinnati, Ohio, United States, near the Ida Street Viaduct. Built in 1886, it is a Gothic Revival structure built primarily of brick. Constructed by Mount Adams architect and builder Charles E. Iliff, the church features a two-story rectangular floor plan with a prominent central bell tower. Among its other distinctive architectural elements are the rose windows in the main gable, pairs of windows on its second floor, and the symmetry evidenced in the overall design of the building.

Although Cincinnati was largely Presbyterian in its early history, Mount Adams was originally a strongly Catholic community; Pilgrim Presbyterian was the first Protestant church of any denomination to be founded in that neighborhood. Today, the congregation is no longer in existence: the building is now owned by Pilgrim Chapel United Church of Christ, and its name is absent from the roster of the Cincinnati Presbytery of the Presbyterian Church.

In 1980, the former Pilgrim Presbyterian Church was listed on the National Register of Historic Places. It qualified for inclusion on the Register both because of its distinctive historic architecture and because of its place in local history.
