= Cherry Hill School (South Carolina) =

- U.S. National Register of Historic Places
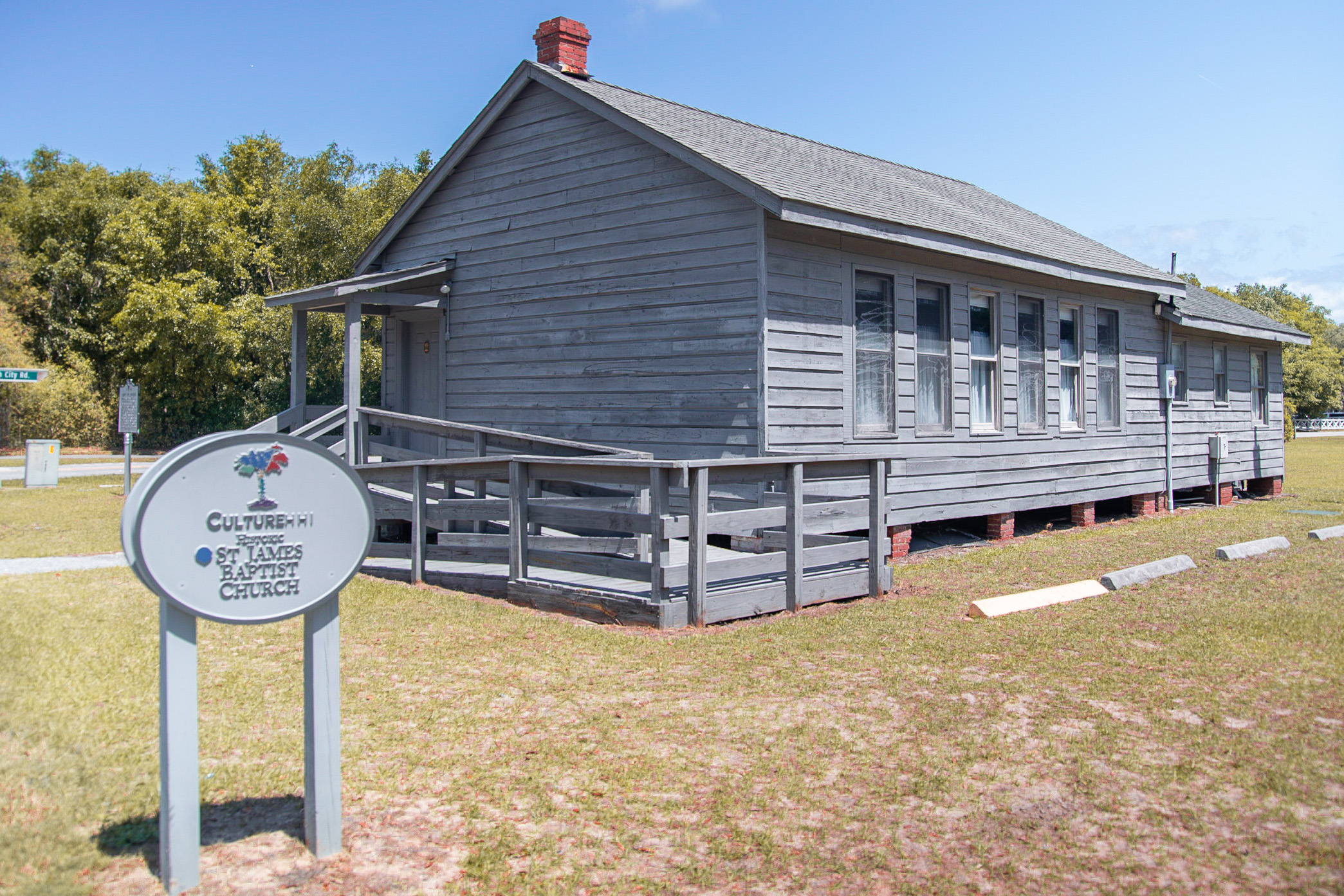

- Location within South Carolina Location within the United States
- Location: 210 Dillon Rd. Hilton Head Island, South Carolina
- Coordinates: 32°14′05″N 80°41′28″W
- Area: less than one acre
- Built: c. 1937
- Architectural style: Vernacular
- NRHP reference No.: 12000965
- Added to NRHP: November 21, 2012

Cherry Hill School is a historic school for African-American students located at Hilton Head Island, Beaufort County, South Carolina. It was the first separate school building for African-American students on the island.

== Architecture ==
The school is a simple, gable-front rectangular one-room frame and weatherboard-sided schoolhouse on an open brick-pier foundation.

== History ==
The community that built and helped maintain the school consisted of the descendants of the former-slave town of Mitchelville, the first community to mandate education in the South. The community raised the funds to buy land for the school building. The building would replace an earlier Cherry Hill School, which held its classes at St. James parsonage.

The school was built about 1937. It was an elementary school with one teacher that served about 30 students annually. When it opened it taught grades 1–5; 6th grade was added in the 1938 school year.

The school operated until all African-American children attended the new consolidated Hilton Head Elementary School in 1954. The St. James Baptist Church purchased the school in 1956, and used the building as a multi-purpose space. The church extended and renovated the building in 1984.

It was listed in the National Register of Historic Places in 2012. In 2013 a historical marker was erected near the building.

In 2019 plans were announced to relocate the school as part of an expansion for the Hilton Head Airport.
