= Jermain G. Porter =

American astronomer

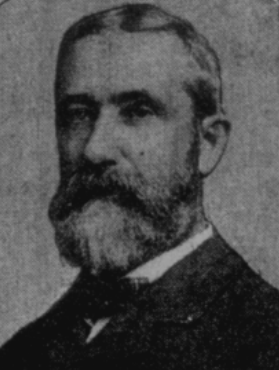
- Born: January 8, 1852; Buffalo, New York
- Died: April 14, 1933 (aged 81)
- Occupations: Astronomer, writer

Jermain Gildersleeve Porter (January 8, 1852 – April 14, 1933) was an American astronomer and opponent of the theory of relativity.

Porter was born at Buffalo, New York. He studied at Hamilton College, was employed by the United States Coast and Geodetic Survey in 1878, and from 1884 to 1930 was director of the Cincinnati Observatory and professor at the University of Cincinnati. He observed comets and nebulae, but gained a name mainly through his three star catalogs (1895–1905) and through his studies of the stars motion, collected in the Catalog of Proper Motion Stars, I – IV (1915–18), Publications of the Cincinnati Observatory No. 18.

He also authored Variation of Latitude 1899–1906 (1908) and The Stars in Song and Legend (1901). Together with Elliott Smith, he published the Catalog of 4683 Stars of the Epoch 1900, Publications of the Cincinnati Observatory, No. 193, in which he also stated his own movements. He also made a name for himself as an opponent of the theory of relativity.

== Selected publications ==
- Historical Sketch of the Cincinnati Observatory 1843-1893 (1893)
- The Stars in Song and Legend (1901)
- The Overthrow of Newton's Theory of Gravitation (1920)
- The Relativity Deflection of Light: Facts versus Theory (1929)
- Recent Textbooks and Relativity (1927)
