= Fort Howell =

- U.S. National Register of Historic Places
- Location within South Carolina Location within the United States
- Nearest city: Hilton Head, South Carolina
- Coordinates: 32°14′4″N 80°41′31″W
- NRHP reference No.: 11000371
- Added to NRHP: June 15, 2011

Fort Howell is an earthworks fort built in 1864 during the American Civil War, located on Hilton Head Island, South Carolina. It was named in honor of Union Army Brigadier General Joshua B. Howell, and Its primary function was to protect Mitchelville, a Freedman's town located to its east.

It was named to the National Register of Historic Places on June 15, 2011. It was named as a site on the National Park Service's Network to Freedom, Underground Railroad. It is also a site on the Civil War Discovery Trail http://www.civilwar.org/civil-war-discovery-trail/ The Fort is owned by the Hilton Head Island Land Trust, Inc., a non-profit organization whose goal is to protect and preserve the Fort in perpetuity.

== Current Condition ==
Fort Howell, an essentially pentagonal enclosure constructed of built-up earth, is quite discernible despite natural erosion and the growth of trees and other vegetation over a period of almost 150 years. Today, it is an historic site that is open to the public with adjacent areas for parking and several interpretive signs. There is a kiosk with signage which explains the history surrounding the Fort. Metal figures representing soldiers and others, created by local artist, Mary Ann Ford, are placed about the grounds. Admission is free and the Fort is open from dawn to dusk. Additionally, guided tours are provided in partnership between the Hilton Head Island Land Trust, Inc. and the Coastal Discovery Museum.

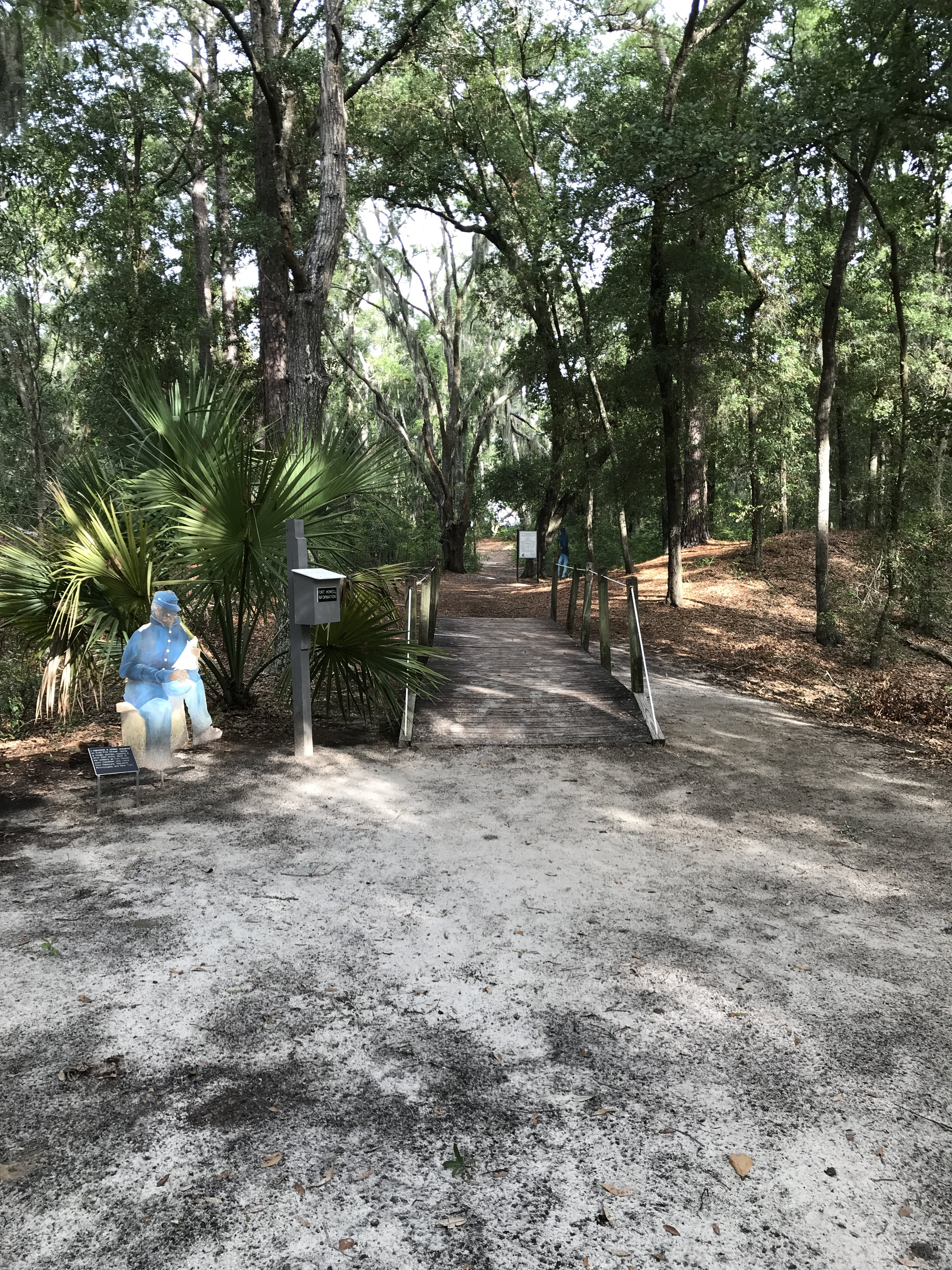
The official entrance into Fort Howell, including the bridge over the surrounding moat.

== History ==
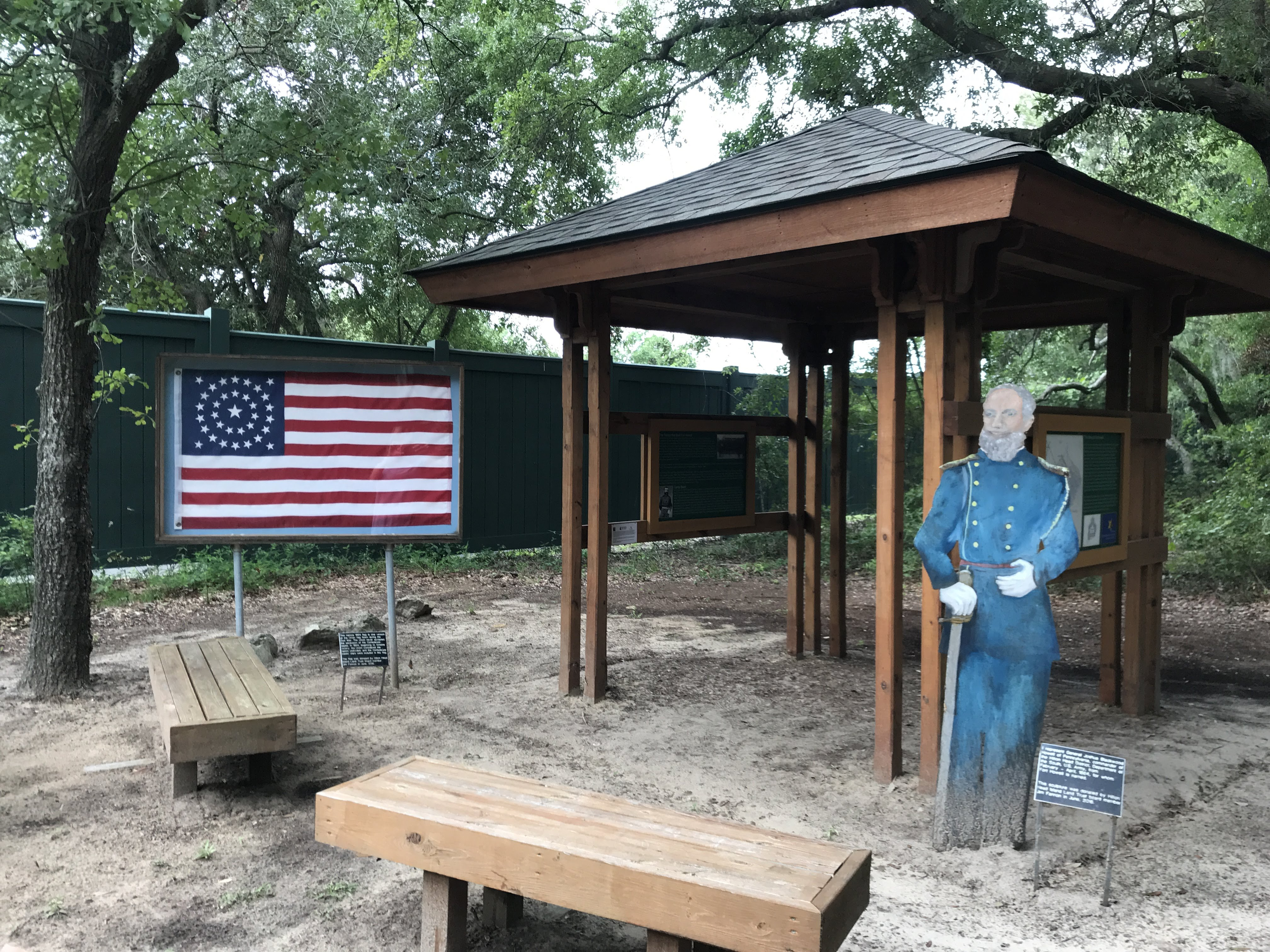
An informational kiosk on the grounds of Fort Howell.

Fort Howell is an earthworks fort built in 1864 during the American Civil War by the 32nd United States Colored Infantry Regiment (Union) from Pennsylvania and the 144th New York Infantry - regiments belonging to the Hilton Head District, Department of the South, United States Army. It was constructed from late August or early September to mid-October 1864, using shovels, spades, picks, and axes, and working under the supervision of Captain Patrick McGuire of Company A, 1st New York Engineers and the officers and enlisted men of several companies of that regiment. It was built as a semi-permanent fort designed to be manned by artillerymen serving a variety of garrison, siege, or "seacoast" artillery pieces. Intended to protect the approaches to the nearby freedman's village of Mitchelville, it was constructed on an open site just southwest of the settlement, likely on a recently logged site or a fallow cotton field.

The Fort was designed to hold as many as 27 guns, 16 of them grouped in barbette batteries firing from wooden platforms over the parapet wall, and 11 of them grouped in embrasure batteries firing through openings in the parapet wall. Intended to protect the approaches to the nearby freedmen's village of Mitchelville, it was constructed on an open site just southwest of the settlement, likely on a recently logged site or a fallow cotton field, and covers more than 3 acres of land.

While the Fort saw no action, it served as a testament to the excellent skills of Chief Engineer and Captain Charles Suter, and military engineering exhibited by the men of the day as a permanent and defensible earthwork fort. The exterior of the fort featured a moat and wooden palisade - sharpened logs driven into the ground to slow advancing troops. The area directly adjacent to the fort walls was further protected by guns mounted in bastions.

== Construction ==
Annotated 1864 plan of the fort

Two Federal regiments, one African-American (the 32nd United States Colored Infantry), and one white (the 144th New York Infantry), built this field fortification as a significant late-war addition to the defenses of Hilton Head, part of the Hilton Head District, Department of the South.

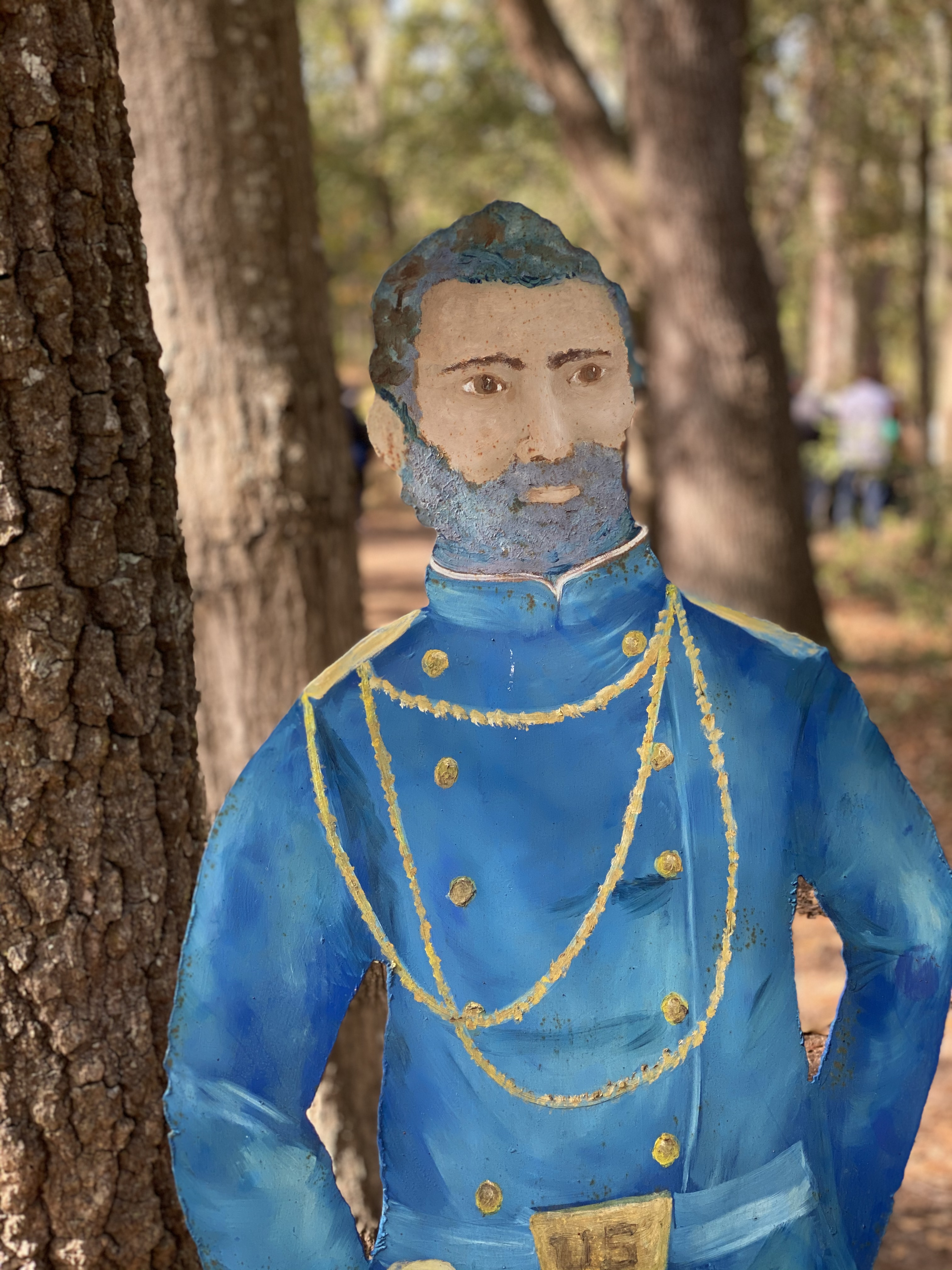
Replication of a Soldier Who Helped Build Fort Howell

On 18 August 1864, the day after he ordered Suter to begin designing and building the fort near Mitchelville, Foster ordered Brig. Gen. Alexander Schimmelfennig, commanding the Northern District (Morris Island, Folly Island, and Little Folly Island) to send one of his white regiments “to go north,” and to send the 32nd United States Colored Infantry to Hilton Head Island. The next day Brig. Gen. Edward E. Potter, commanding the Hilton Head District, ordered Col. George W. Baird of the 32nd United States Colored Infantry to move his regiment “to a point just beyond Mitchelville and encamp on ground which will be designated by Capt. Suter Chief Engineer Dept. South near which a work is to be constructed under his direction.” Potter's instructions were specific: “The 32nd U.S.C.T. [United States Colored Troops] will be charged with the construction of this work and will furnish daily as large a detail for this purpose as the strength of the Regiment will permit. The working parties will report to the Engineer Officer superintending the construction.”

Fatigue details from the 32nd United States Colored Infantry, camped nearby at Camp Baird (named for their colonel) did most of the construction from late August or early September to mid-October 1864, using shovels, spades, picks, and axes, and working under the supervision of Captain Patrick McGuire of Company A, 1st New York Engineers (Serrell's Engineers) and the officers and enlisted men of several companies of that regiment.

The 32nd United States Colored Infantry numbered approximately 500 officers and men, with white commissioned officers and black noncommissioned officers and other enlisted men, as was standard practice with black regiments in the United States Army during the Civil War.

Its work on the fort was slowed and complicated somewhat by its officers’ apparent reluctance to assign sufficient men to the task, and by its soldiers’ apparent reluctance toward or inability to perform the hard labor necessary to complete it. It was common for Federal commanders to assign their black units to fatigue duty, and especially to employ them to build or improve of field fortifications. In this way they could “save” their white units for combat. Officers in the Department of the South were no exception. Captain Joseph Walker of the 1st New York Engineers, who supervised black troops working on the fortifications of Morris Island in 1863, expressed a view typical of many Federal officers when he wrote that African-American soldiers “have great constancy. . . . Their status is mediocrity, and this uniformity and mediocrity, for military fatigue duty, I think answers best.”

The white officers and black enlisted men of the United States Colored Troops, however, often protested such treatment, sometimes informally, and sometimes in writing. African-American soldiers and their white officers often resented their being assigned to tasks that white units were ordered to do less frequently, and especially so in the case of building field fortifications, when the example of slaves being made to construct them for the Confederates was such an obvious parallel to their status as blacks, even as free men, in the United States Army.

One of the most eloquent protests over excessive fatigue duty was that written by Private Nimrod Rowley of the 20th United States Colored Infantry, serving in Louisiana, to Abraham Lincoln in August 1864. Rowley, weary of working in “one of the most horable swamps in Louisiana stinking and misery,” addressed his appeal to “My Dear Friend and x Pre” about the same time the 32nd United States Colored Infantry began building Fort Howell on Hilton Head Island. Rowley wrote Lincoln, we are treated in a Different maner to what others Rigiments is Both Northern men or Southern Raised Rigiment Instead of the Musket It is the Spad and the Whelbarrow and the Axe.

As for the work of constructing Fort Howell that fall, McGuire reported more than once that between 250 and 300 members of the 32nd United States Colored Infantry were typically assigned to guard duty either in their camp or in Mitchelville for the day, performing a non-essential duty, but only 150 to 200 of them were typically assigned to work on the fort for the day. McGuire and Suter, however, expected a daily average of 250 to 300 men working on the fort out of a total strength of about 450-500 available, and were frustrated by their inability to form larger work details. On 2 September Suter wrote Potter, commanding the Hilton Head District, about the problem. “I think that a regiment of this size ought to furnish at least from 250 to 300 for duty and in this I think you will agree with me. Their camp guard for instance is absurdly large.”

On 3 October Foster wrote Rear-Admiral John A. Dahlgren of the United States Navy, commanding the South Atlantic Blockading Squadron, proposing that the army remove the garrison then at Fort Seward, at Bay Point on Phillips Island opposite Fort Welles. Fort Seward, originally a Confederate earthwork built in 1861 and named for Confederate General P.G.T. Beauregard (1818-1893), had been renamed for United States Secretary of State William H. Seward (1801-1872) by the Federals after the Battle of Port Royal Sound. On 8 June Suter had reported to Foster's predecessor Hatch that Fort Seward then held 13 guns, but his report did not specify their types or sizes.

Foster suggested turning the fort over to Dahlgren and the Navy after removing the guns and carriages, which he believed “will be of value to me in arming the new field forts at this place [Forts Howell and Sherman] and Beaufort [Fort Stevens].” Dahlgren quickly agreed to Foster's proposal, and Foster indorsed it with the comment, “The guns are to be used to arm Forts Sherman, Howell, and Stevens, the selection of the guns for each being made by Captain Suter. The present garrison of Fort Seward will help dismount and load the guns, and will then rejoin their regiment.”

By mid-October the 32nd United States Colored Infantry was split up, with its companies ordered to various points on Hilton Head Island and elsewhere in the Department of the South. Companies began leaving Camp Baird and Fort Howell on 14 October, and by 31 October regimental headquarters was at Seabrook's Plantation, overlooking Skull Creek between Hilton Head Island and Pinckney Island, northwest of Fort Howell and near Fort Mitchel / Battery Mitchel.

On 28 October Foster reported to Halleck, “matters remain about the same. The works on the fortifications are being pushed forward as rapidly as possible.” On 8 November, he reported, “everything remains in a quiet state, the troops being occupied in strengthening and improving the defenses and drilling.”

Fatigue details from the 144th New York Infantry, which had been ordered to report to the “camp for instruction for colored troops” on Hilton Head Island on 9 June, completed the fort from mid-October to late November 1864, also under the supervision of the 1st New York Engineers. There is also some evidence that the regiment was camped near, or perhaps at, the completed fort, and guarding a camp of Confederate prisoners of war in the vicinity of Fort Howell in the winter of 1864–1865.

Fort Howell never saw action, for by the time it was completed near the end of 1864 the Confederate Department of South Carolina, Georgia, and Florida lacked the forces to offer much of a significant threat to the Federal presence on Hilton Head Island—or elsewhere in the state, for that matter. One of the last engagements of any real note in the South Carolina lowcountry occurred on 30 November 1864 at Honey Hill, in present-day Jasper County, when a Federal expedition—including both the 32nd United States Colored Infantry and the 144th New York Infantry—attempted to cut the Charleston and Savannah Railroad but was repulsed by Confederate defenders.

== Engineering ==
Fort Howell is one of the most intact and best preserved Civil War field fortifications in South Carolina, and is particularly significant as a fine example of a sophisticated Federal earthwork built in an area occupied by the United States Army for an extended period. Federal field fortifications of this size and complexity are rare in a state in which most surviving earthworks, whether temporary or semi-permanent, were constructed by the Confederate States Army near the coast, either on major sea islands near Charleston such as James Island or John's Island in present-day Charleston County, or in the interior protecting the line of the strategic Charleston and Savannah Railroad in present-day Beaufort, Charleston, Colleton, and Jasper Counties.

This fort is an outstanding example of the larger semi-permanent earthworks designed by United States Army engineers and intended to be significant defensive positions, usually standing alone but sometimes built in conjunction with and cooperating with a system of linear field fortifications manned by infantry. The standard field fortification of the war followed a pattern established by Professor Dennis Hart Mahan of the United States Military Academy at West Point, New York, who was considered the leading American authority on military engineering. Mahan's A Complete Treatise of Field Fortifications, first published in 1836 and revised and reprinted several times before and during the Civil War, was based in part on European models, most of them French, of the seventeenth and eighteenth centuries.

While its method of construction—built-up earth, reinforced by wooden timbers and supplemented by wooden platforms as necessary—was typical of field fortifications for infantry and artillery alike, its design was necessarily more elaborate than those manned by infantry, as it was intended to maximize the effectiveness of an artillery fortification whose guns were fixed, or essentially so. Though designed by engineers, it was constructed by infantrymen under their supervision.

It features an essentially pentagonal form with two bastions and a priest-cap, four magazines, and emplacements for mounting up to 27 guns, 16 of them garrison guns (also called “seacoast” or siege guns) but the other 11 of them field guns.
