= Observatory Historic District =

Historic district in Ohio, United States

- U.S. National Register of Historic Places
- U.S. Historic district
- Cincinnati Local Historic Landmark
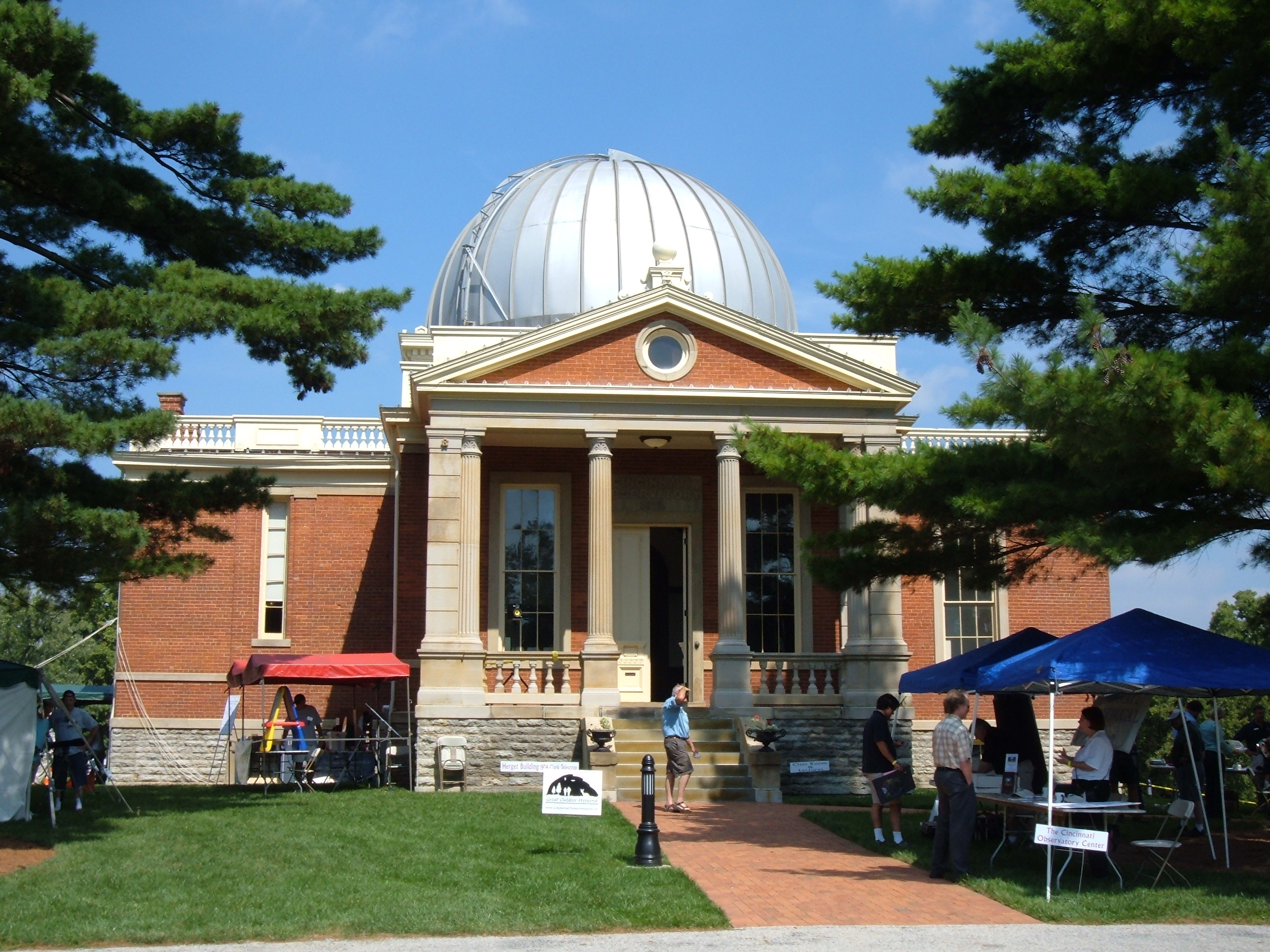
- Cincinnati Observatory, the core of the district

- Location within Ohio Location within the United States
- Location: Observatory Pl. and Ave., Cincinnati, Ohio
- Coordinates: 39°8′18″N 84°25′22″W
- Area: 10.4 acres (4.2 ha)
- Built: 1873
- Architect: Samuel Hannaford, et al
- Architectural style: Greek Revival, Victorian
- NRHP reference No.: 78002080
- Added to NRHP: September 20, 1978

The Observatory Historic District is a historic portion of the Hyde Park neighborhood of Cincinnati, Ohio, United States. Centered around the Cincinnati Observatory and strung largely along a single street, the district has been named a historic district by both local and federal historic preservation agencies.

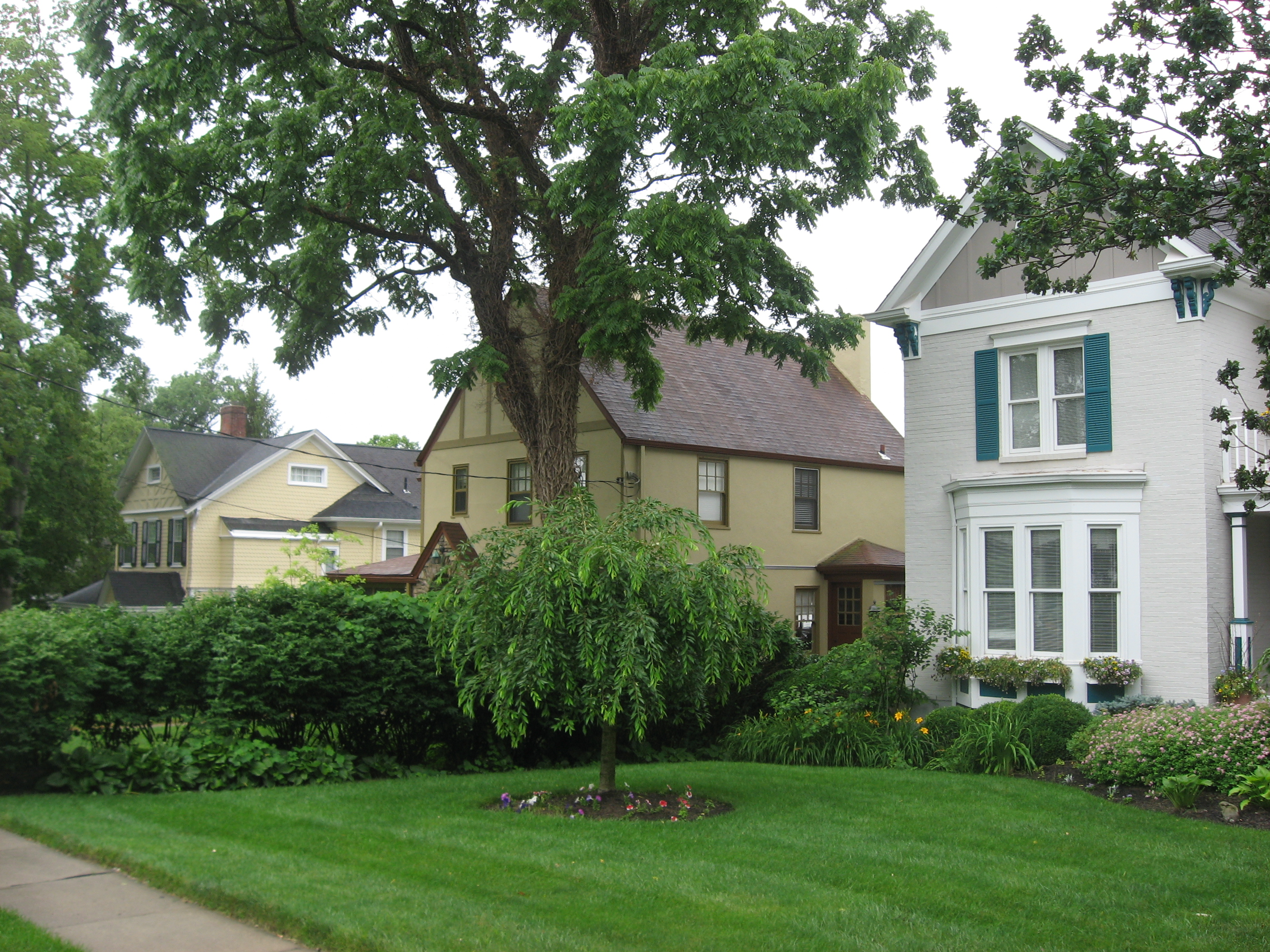
Houses on the western side of the street

In 1873, the Cincinnati Observatory was erected within the boundaries of the present district, with residential construction beginning in the following year; houses continued to be built until the eve of World War I. When the Cincinnati and Eastern Railway built a nearby rail line in 1882, housing construction began in earnest; the house at 3300 Observatory Place had already been built by Observatory director Ormond Stone in 1877, but most residences were built between 1886 and 1904. Given the forty-year span over which the houses were constructed, numerous architectural styles are found in the district, including the Neoclassical, the Second Empire, and various other Victorian styles. Despite its varying styles, the neighborhood presents a unified theme — all of the residences feature architectural detailing typical of late Victorian period, and their orientation unambiguously focuses attention on the Observatory: the result is a cohesive late nineteenth century neighborhood, easily distinguished from other streets in the neighborhood. The residences are comparable in size and shape, generally built as two-story single-family houses with similar setbacks, while the district is surrounded by open land rather than closely packed residential neighborhoods in order to reduce light pollution for the Observatory.

The district comprises ten contributing properties, plus the Observatory: six buildings that are critical to the district and four that are peripheral, all along or near Observatory Place. Cincinnati's planning office has named the neighborhood a historic district, and it was named a federal historic district by addition to the National Register of Historic Places in September 1978. The planning office has established provisions for continued preservation of the neighborhood including the district, including ensuring that any modifications be sympathetic (i.e. that the new construction minimize stylistic changes), preserving architectural details and windows, exercising care in painting and repointing walls, emphasizing the importance of constructing any new buildings with the same shape and height as existing buildings, and avoiding the addition of signage, new fences or walls, and additional pavement.
