= Pilgrim Congregational Church =

Pilgrim Congregational Church may refer to:

== United States ==
(by state)

- Pilgrim Congregational Church (Redding, California), designed by Frank Lloyd Wright
- Pilgrim Congregational Church (Arkansas City, Kansas), listed on the National Register of Historic Places (NRHP)
- Pilgrim Congregational Church (Taunton, Massachusetts), NRHP-listed
- Pilgrim Congregational Church (Worcester, Massachusetts), NRHP-listed
- Pilgrim Congregational Church (Duluth, Minnesota)
- Pilgrim Congregational Church (Cleveland, Ohio), NRHP-listed
- Pilgrim Congregational Church (Oklahoma City, Oklahoma), NRHP-listed

== See also ==
- Pilgrim Church (disambiguation)
