= Mitchelville =

Town built during the American Civil War

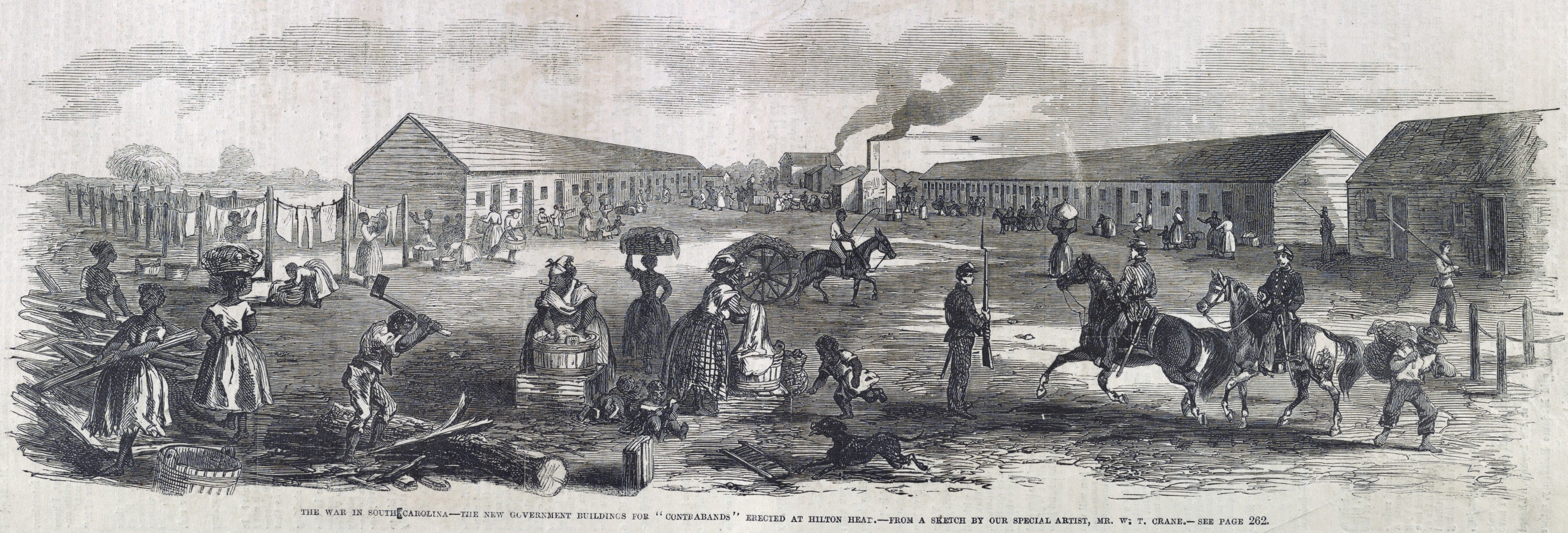
The new government buildings for "contrabands" erected at Hilton Head, Mitchelville in 1862

Mitchelville was a town built during the American Civil War for formerly enslaved people, located on what is now Hilton Head Island, South Carolina. It was named for one of the local Union Army generals, Ormsby M. Mitchel. The town was a population center for the enterprise known as the Port Royal Experiment.

== History ==
During the first year of the Civil War, on November 7, 1861, Union forces consisting of approximately 60 ships and 20,000 men under the command of Union Navy Captain Samuel F. DuPont and Army General Thomas W. Sherman attacked Confederate forces commanded by Brig. Gen. Thomas F. Drayton (a local planter) defending Hilton Head Island at Fort Walker and Fort Beauregard. By 3:00 p.m., the Confederate forces had retreated from the forts; when Union troops landed on Hilton Head Island, they encountered no resistance and discovered that the white inhabitants of the island had already fled to the mainland.

Hilton Head Island became the Union's southern headquarters for the war and a military supply depot. Fortifications (such as Fort Howell), a hospital, barracks, and other utilitarian structures were built for the military, which at times numbered 30,000 men. The island was used as a staging ground for the blockading of Savannah and Charleston.

Within two days of the Union capture of the island, approximately 150 formerly enslaved people (or those left behind by the Hilton Head Island planters when they fled the island) came to the Union army's encampment; by December 15, approximately 320 formerly enslaved people sought refuge at the Union army's encampment. One Union soldier stationed on Hilton Head at the time recounted:

Negro slaves came flocking into our camp by the hundreds, escaping their masters when they knew of the landing of "Linkum sojers" [sic], as they called us - many of them with no other clothing than gunnysacks

— Trinkley 1986.

In February 1862, there were at least 600 contrabands living in Union encampments on Hilton Head Island.

These formerly enslaved people were regarded as "contraband of war" or as simply "contrabands;" they were not yet technically "freedmen", and the Union army was unsure of what to do with them. General Thomas West Sherman repeatedly wrote his superiors in Washington asking for guidance regarding, and supplies for, the "contrabands". Official policy regarding "contrabands" varied between Union-occupied areas, a problem which persisted throughout the war.

On February 6, 1862, General Sherman issued General Order 9, which requested assistance for the “contrabands” from the "highly favored and philanthropic people" in the north. Help came from two sources: from the philanthropic northerners whom Sherman requested assistance from (such as that given by the American Missionary Association); and from Secretary of the Treasury Salmon P. Chase, who sent his colleague and outspoken opponent of slavery Edward L. Pierce to Port Royal to examine and eventually oversee the government effort regarding the freed slaves. Pierce and representatives from the American Missionary Association quickly devised a plan for the education, welfare, and employment of the formerly enslaved people. In April 1862, a military order was issued freeing the Black people on the Sea Islands. On January 1, 1863, President Abraham Lincoln issued the Emancipation Proclamation, freeing all slaves in the rebellious/Confederate states, which included South Carolina:

The Executive Government of the United States, including the military and naval authority thereof, will recognize and maintain the freedom of such persons, and will do no act or acts to repress such persons, or any of them, in any efforts they may make for their actual freedom ... and I recommend to them that, in all cases when allowed, they labor faithfully for reasonable wages

— NARA 2005.

Many Union officers complained that the formerly enslaved people "were becoming a burden and a nuisance." Some Union troops stole from the citizens of Mitchelville, and it is apparent from primary resources that the racial attitudes of some of the Union troops towards the Black people were negative; General Mitchel remarked that he found "a feeling prevailing among the officers and soldiers of prejudice against the blacks." By February 1862, the formerly enslaved people were living inside the Union camps, in whitewashed, wooden barrack-like structures built specifically for them and under the control of the Quartermaster's Department; similar camps were also built in nearby Beaufort, Bay Point, and Otter Island. But by October 1862, however, Union leaders believed this approach was a failure, as living conditions for the freedmen were substandard and there was a need to separate the soldiers from the formerly enslaved people, and vice versa:

Some wholesome changes are contemplated by the new regime, not the least of which is the removal of the negro quarters beyond the stockade, where they can at once have more comfort and freedom for improvement ... Accordingly, a spot has been selected near the Drayton Plantation for a Negro village. They are able to build their own houses, and will probably be encouraged to establish their own police.

— CFI 1995

== Creation of Mitchelville ==
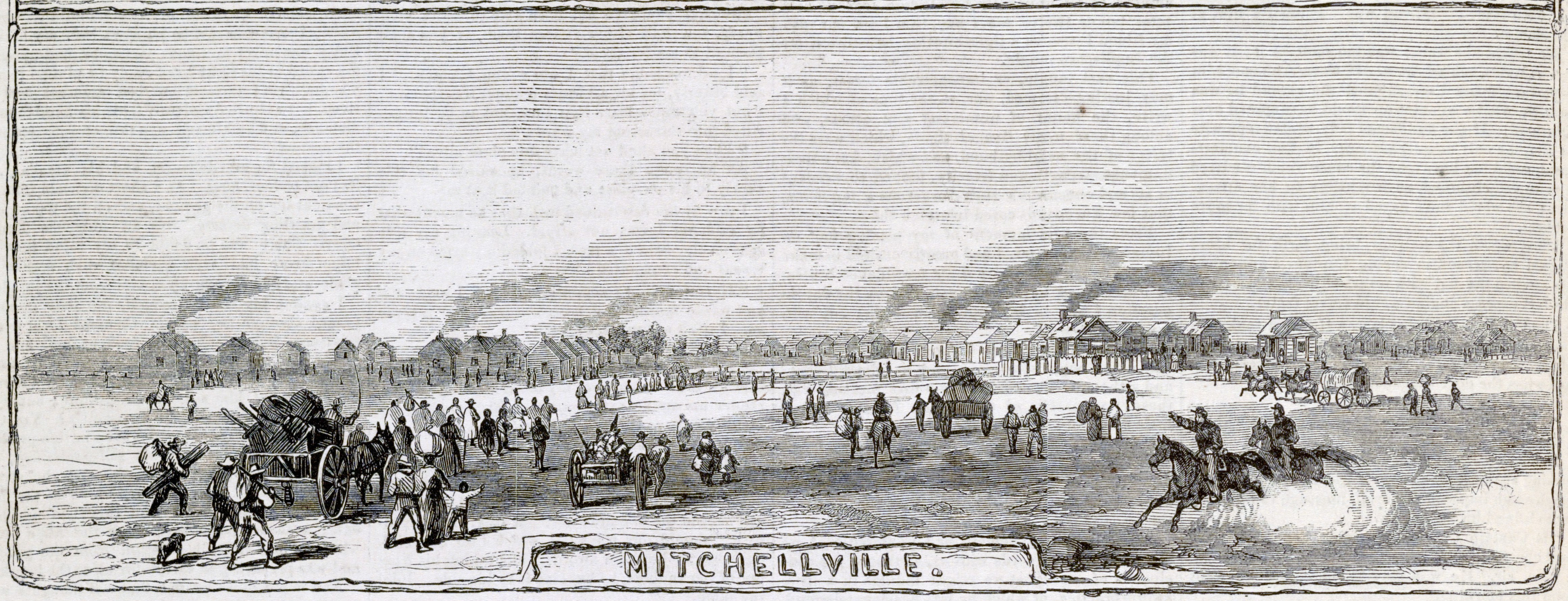
Mitchelville, the new south village for contrabands, Hilton in 1863

Maj. Gen. Ormsby M. Mitchel, Commander of the Department of the South and headquartered at Hilton Head, decided to develop a town for the formerly enslaved people. Built in a cotton field on the former Drayton Plantation and in close proximity to the military camps, it was eventually known as Mitchelville after the commander. Unlike other contraband camps, Mitchelville was developed as a regular town, with roads, one-quarter-acre lots, elected officials (some officials were appointed by the Union military, however), a church, various laws addressing such issues as community behavior and sanitation, collection of taxes, and a compulsory education law for children between the ages of six and fifteen. This was likely the first such law in the South.

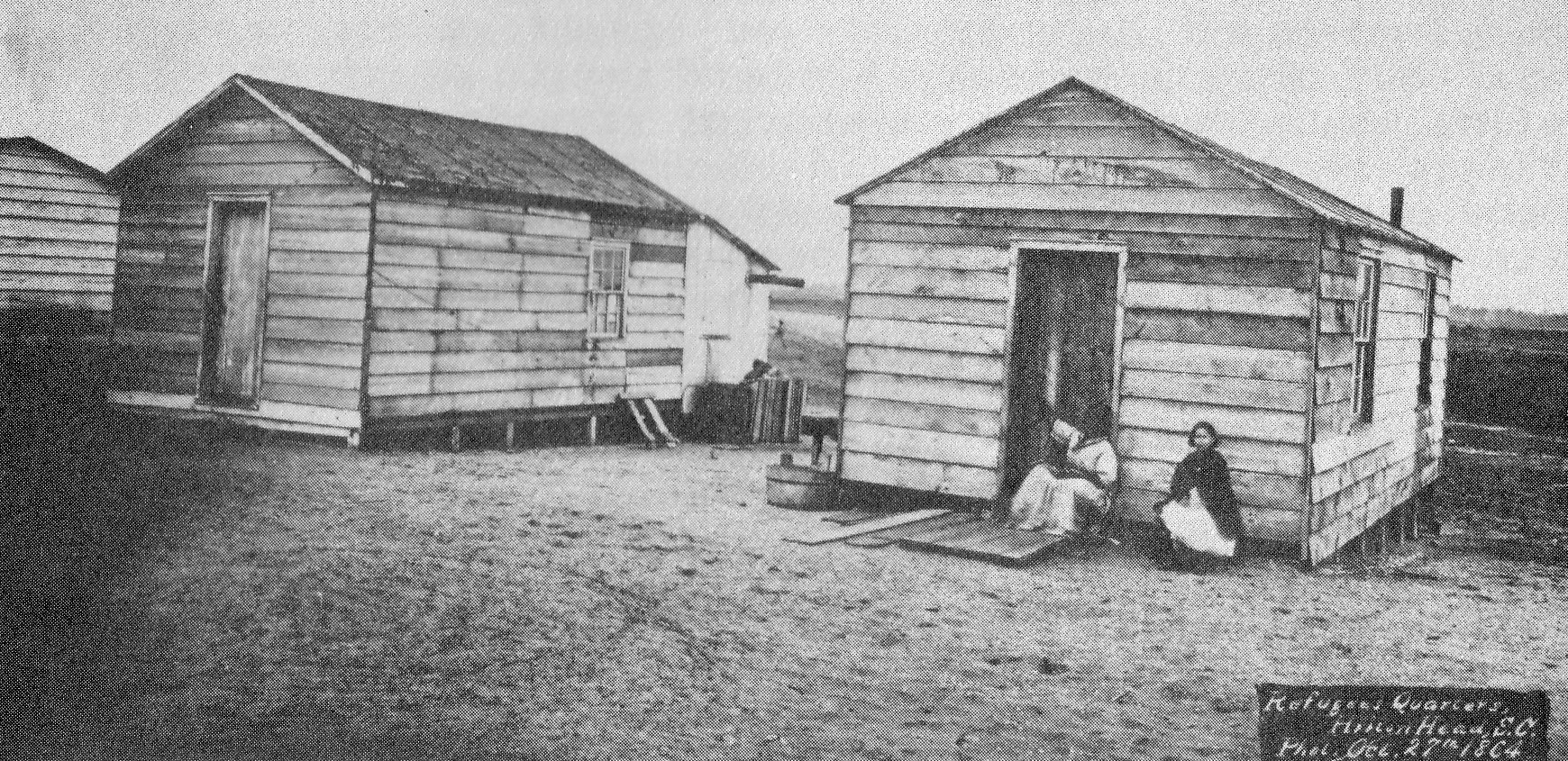
"Refugee quarters" 1864, Mitchelville

By late November 1862, Federal tax commissioners were able to fix taxes on local plantations, with Fish Hall (Tract No. 3) being assessed as being worth $5,200.00, with $156.00 in taxes owed. When Thomas Drayton failed to pay the taxes due on the property, it was advertised for sale by the Federal government. The government purchased it, holding it until 1875, when white Democrats regained control of the state legislature shortly before the end of Reconstruction.

The town was established by late 1862, and contained about 1,500 residents by November 1865. The residents of Mitchelville supported themselves largely by wage labor for the military, earning mostly between four dollars and twelve dollars a month, depending on their level of skill. Nearly all of the wage jobs for the residents of Mitchelville ceased when the Union military departed the island in 1868, more than two years after the end of the war. The residents switched to a subsistence farming-based economy, with many forming farming collectives, joining together to rent large tracts of land from the government. Documents show that many of the Hilton Head Island freedmen experienced an extreme shortage of food after the military departed the island.

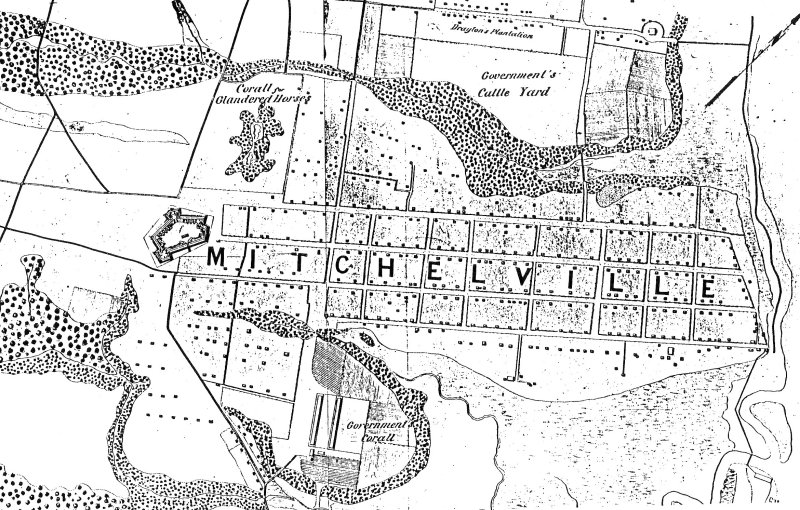
Map of Mitchelville, c. 1860s

The town or village continued relatively intact into the early 1870s. But sometime in the early 1880s, Mitchelville ceased being a true town. It dissolved to a small, kinship-based community that survived into the 1920s. A 1920 topographic map of Hilton Head Island shows a cluster of buildings centered around a church. Previous archaeological investigations have concluded that the majority of Mitchelville was abandoned by c. 1890.

=== Churches/religion ===
The First Baptist Church was founded in 1862 with 120 members and with the ex-slave Abraham Murchison as its first minister. By 1866, there were three churches in Mitchelville—the First Baptist Church, a Free Will Baptist church, and a Methodist church. Several missionary groups were active on Hilton Head Island during the war, but by 1866 all but the American Missionary Association had left the island. The American Missionary Association was largely funded by the Wesleyan Methodists, Free Presbyterians, and Free Will Baptists during the war years. After 1866, it relied on funds from the United States Tax Commission as northern interest waned in the freedmen on the Sea Islands.

=== School ===
In 1866 Hilton Head Island was divided into five school districts: Mitchelville, Marshland, Seabrook, Stoney, and Lawton. In Mitchelville District, the American Missionary Association supplied most of the teachers, and offered primary, intermediate, and high school classes at the various churches. There were as many as 238 students being taught in the district at one time, with classes meeting for up to five hours per day. Attendance varied according to job requirements and travel conditions of the students. Most teachers were white northerners, but in 1869 there was at least one black assistant teacher, and Sunday school lessons were taught by black teachers around 1870. Descendants of the formerly enslaved town of Mitchelville built the Cherry Hill School in 1937.

=== Structures ===
Military sawmills provided free lumber for the houses, which were built by the freedmen. Each house was on a one-quarter-acre lot. The typical house measured approximately 12x12ft, was of frame construction, had wood pier foundations, glass-paned windows, wood floors, weatherboard siding, wood shingle roofs, and having either metal stoves or brick and/or "tabby" or wattle and daub ("stick") chimneys. There were four stores in Mitchelville; several closed down after the military left, perhaps because they had survived by overcharging the residents (supplies sold in Mitchelville were priced nearly 600% higher than those sold by the AMA). (Trinkley/CRC-21 1987).

== Post-Civil War ==
Congress soon passed laws restoring lands confiscated by the U.S. government to the Southern landowners who had owned the land prior to the Civil War. In April 1875, the Drayton Plantation lands were returned to the Drayton family. Unfortunately, the U.S. government failed to plan for the protection and preservation of Mitchelville, and its future looked bleak. However, the Drayton family was no longer interested in farming the property, and sold the land to anyone who was interested and had money – including many freedmen.

Most, if not all, of the Mitchelville property was purchased by an African-American carpenter, March Gardner. Gardner was illiterate, but was locally well respected and very successful in his business ventures. Gardner placed his son, Gabriel, in charge of his Mitchelville properties, which at that time included a cotton gin, grist mill, and store. Gabriel eventually took advantage of his father, and obtained a deed for the property in his own name instead of his father's; Gabriel then transferred the property deed to his wife and daughter. In the early 20th century, March Gardner's heirs sued Gabriel Gardner's wife's heirs, claiming that Gabriel Gardner had stolen the property from March and that they were entitled to the property. The legal papers produced by this court case provide a unique insight into Mitchelville during the period.

The daughter of March Gardner, Emmeline Washington, testified that there were a number of families living at Mitchelville and farming three or 4-acre (16,000 m^{2}) plots of land adjacent to their houses. The money that was collected from them for rent was used to pay the taxes on the property. March Gardner had built a cotton house, cotton gin, a steam-powered grist mill, and a shop on the property. Also named were several late-18th and early-19th century residents of Mitchelville: Scapio Drayton, Bob Washington, Jack Screven, Robert Wiley, John Nesbit, Caesar White, Charles Robins, Charles Perry, Clara Wigfall, Renty Miller, Linda Perry, Stephen Singleton, Joe Williams, Billy Reed, Peter Flowers, Charles Pinckney, and Hannah Williams (Hannah Williams stated that she had bought a house in Mitchelville for $5.00).

The court directed that a survey be made of the Mitchelville property, and the property to be divided between each heir of March and Gabriel Gardner involved in the case, with the cost of the case being divided amongst them.

Eugenia Heyward redeemed her 35-acre (140,000 m^{2}) property on June 7, 1923; Celia and Gabriel Boston obtained the adjacent tract of property on September 2, 1921. Linda Perry, Clara Wigfall, and Emmeline Washington also obtained their parcels in 1921. By 1930, Eugenia Heyward's property was sold for $31.00 by the sheriff to pay a defaulted tax bill of $15.00; the property was purchased by Roy A. Rainey from New York, who was purchasing land on Hilton Head Island for hunting.

In 1890, there were approximately 3,000 African-Americans living on Hilton Head Island; by 1930 there were only about 300 living on the island. According to a 2010 estimate approximately 2,766 of the 37,099 year round residents on Hilton Head are African American.
