= Cincinnati Observatory =

Observatory in Cincinnati, Ohio, US

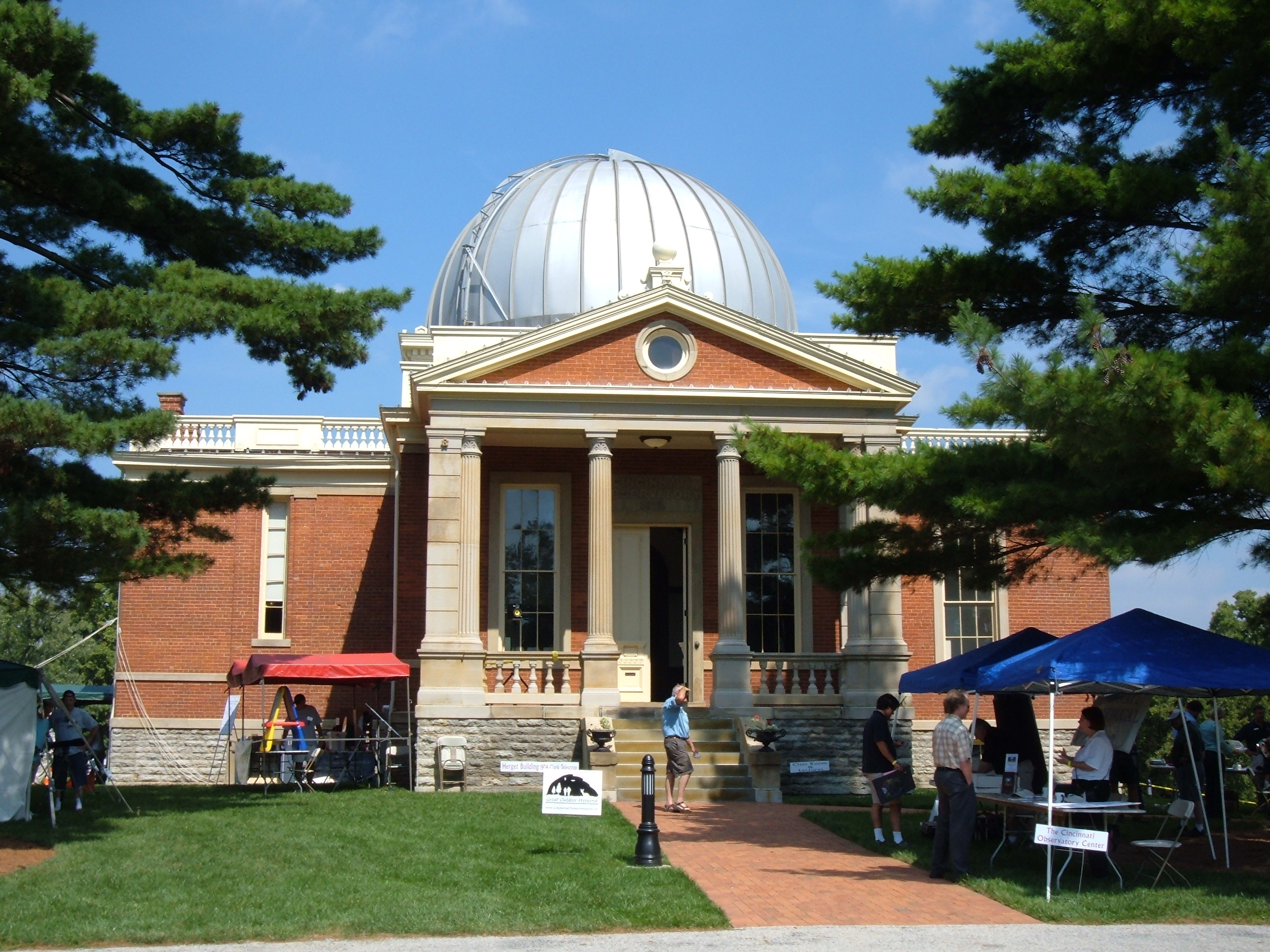
- Original building atop Mt. Lookout
- Observatory code: 765
- Location: Observatory Historic District, Cincinnati, United States
- Coordinates: 39.139°N 84.423°W
- Established: 1843
- Website: Official website

Telescopes
- 1845 Merz und Mahler: Refractor
- 1904 Alvan Clark & Sons: Refractor
- Related media on Commons
- Cincinnati Observatory
- U.S. National Register of Historic Places
- U.S. National Historic Landmark
- Location: Observatory Historic District; 3489 Observatory Place, Cincinnati, Ohio
- Coordinates: 39°8′19″N 84°25′22″W
- Built: 1873
- Architect: Samuel Hannaford
- Architectural style: Greek Revival
- MPS: Samuel Hannaford and Sons TR in Hamilton County
- NRHP reference No.: 80003043

Significant dates
- Added to NRHP: March 3, 1980
- Designated NHL: December 9, 1997

The Cincinnati Observatory, known locally as Mt. Lookout Observatory, is located in Cincinnati, Ohio (United States) on top of Mount Lookout. It consists of two observatory buildings housing an 11-inch (28 cm) and 16 inch (41 cm) aperture refracting telescope. It is the oldest professional observatory in the United States. It was a key facility for astronomical research and education at the University of Cincinnati, which currently owns the observatory. It currently operates as a 19th-century observatory. There are regular viewings through both historical telescopes as well as tours and additional programs. The observatory also has an extensive outreach program, providing astronomical education for the Ohio/Kentucky/Indiana region.

The Cincinnati Observatory is a contributing property to the Observatory Historic District.

== History ==
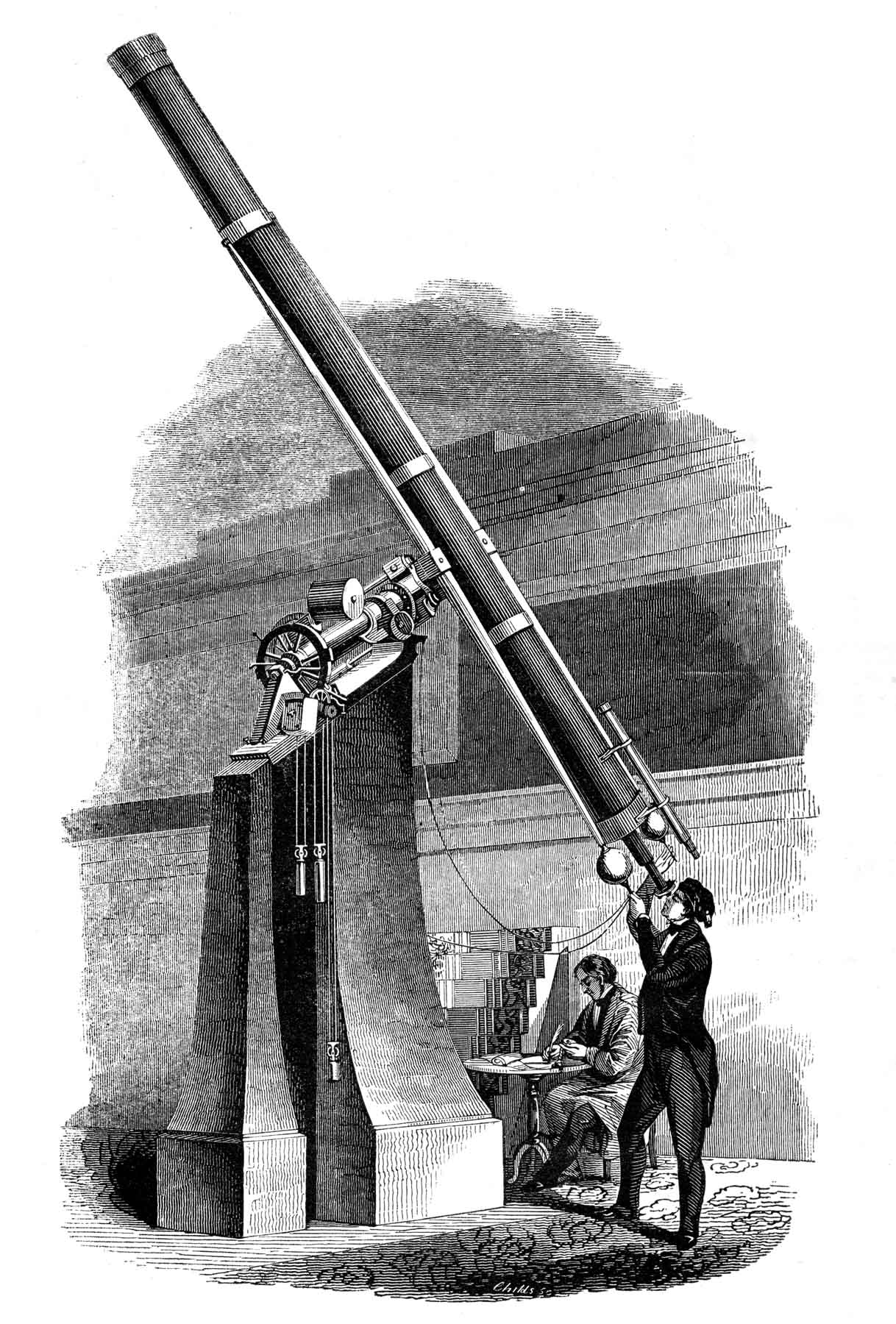
Illustration of the 11 inch "Merz and Mahler" refracting telescope

Cincinnati Observatory was built by Ormsby M. Mitchel at the peak of Mount Ida, a hill that overlooks downtown Cincinnati. Nicholas Longworth donated 4 acres (1.6 ha) of land for the purpose. The Holy Cross Monastery and Chapel stands today at the site. The cornerstone was laid on November 9, 1843, and presiding over the occasion was former President John Quincy Adams, with an introduction by Judge Jacob Burnet. At 77 years old, it was to be his last public speech, and Mount Ida was renamed to Mount Adams in his honor.

The Merz refractor was the biggest telescope in the United States in the early 1840s.

In 1871, the Observatory came under the control of the University of Cincinnati and in 1873 it was transferred from Mt. Adams to Mt. Lookout in order to escape the smoke and dirt of the city, where it remains today. The ground on which it stands was given to the city by John Kilgour in 1872. A smaller structure, the Mitchel Building, holds the original telescope taken from the Mount Adams observatory. The 1873 building was built by the firm of Cincinnati architect Samuel Hannaford. From 1884 to 1930 the director of the Observatory was Jermain G. Porter. In 1998 the Observatory was declared a National Historic Landmark.

The asteroid 1373 Cincinnati was named to honor the staff of the observatory.

=== Instruments ===
- The 1845 Merz und Mahler 11 inch refractor – Housed in the "Mitchel Building". May be the oldest continually used telescope in the world. It is currently used for public education programs.
- The 1904 Alvan Clark & Sons 16 inch refractor – Housed in the "Herget Building". Used in public education programs and graduate research.

== See also ==
- List of observatories
- List of largest optical telescopes in the 19th century
- List of the largest optical telescopes in North America
- Cleveland Abbe
