= Pilgrimage (disambiguation) =

A pilgrimage is a long journey or search of great moral significance.

Pilgrimage may also refer to:

== Film and Television ==
- Pilgrimage (1933 film), a 1933 film by John Ford
- Pilgrimage (2001 film), a 2001 film by Werner Herzog
- Pilgrimage (2017 film), a 2017 film directed by Brendan Muldowney
- Pilgrimage (TV series)

== Literature ==
- The Pilgrimage (O Diário de Um Mago), a novel by Paulo Coelho
- Al-Hajj (“The Pilgrimage”), the twenty-second sura of the Qur'an
- Pilgrimage (novel sequence), a sequence of novels by Dorothy Richardson
- Pilgrimage (Peregrinação), an autobiography by Fernão Mendes Pinto
- Pilgrimage: The Book of the People, a novel by Zenna Henderson

== Music ==
- Pilgrimage (Larry Gatlin album)
- Pilgrimage (Michael Brecker album)
- Pilgrimage (Om album)
- Pilgrimage (Wishbone Ash album)
- The Pilgrimage (album), 2011 album by Cappadonna
- Pilgrimage, a solo cantata composed by Carlisle Floyd
- “Pilgrimage”, a song by Conjure One from Extraordinary Ways
- “Pilgrimage”, a song by Ichiko Aoba from Windswept Adan
- “Pilgrimage”, a song by Nine Inch Nails from The Fragile
- “Pilgrimage”, a song by R.E.M. from Murmur
- “Pilgrimage”, a song by Suzanne Vega from Days of Open Hand
- Pilgrimage Music & Cultural Festival

== Other uses ==
- Great Pilgrimage or Women's Suffrage Pilgrimage, march in England and Wales in 1913
- Pilgrimage (demo party), an annual demoscene party in Salt Lake City, Utah
- Pilgrimage (horse), a racehorse

== See also ==
- Pilgrim (disambiguation)
