= Mount Adams, Cincinnati =

Coordinates: 39°06′33″N 84°29′46″W

Mount Adams Mount Ida
- Neighborhood of Cincinnati
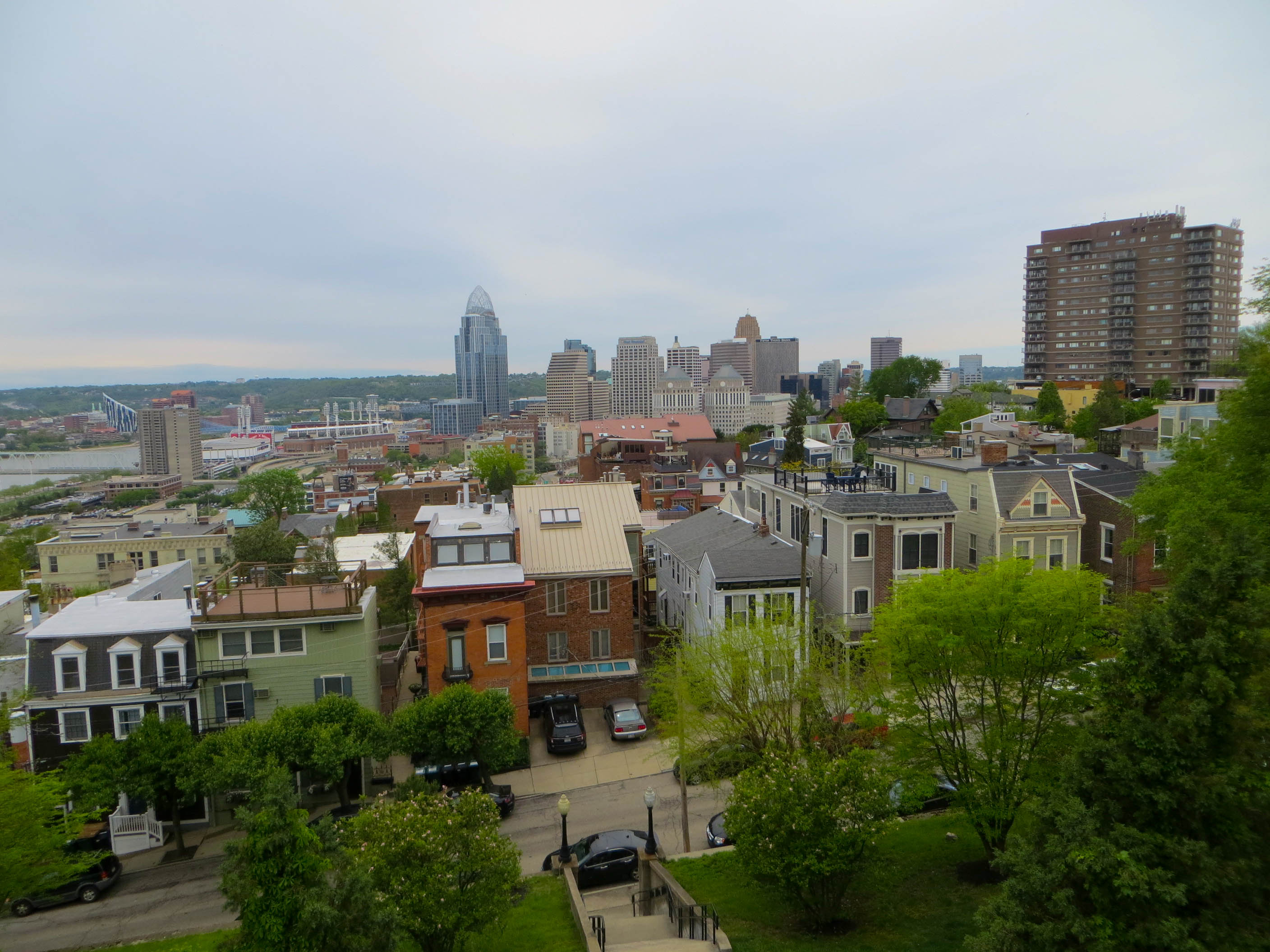
- Mount Adams streetscape, facing downtown Cincinnati

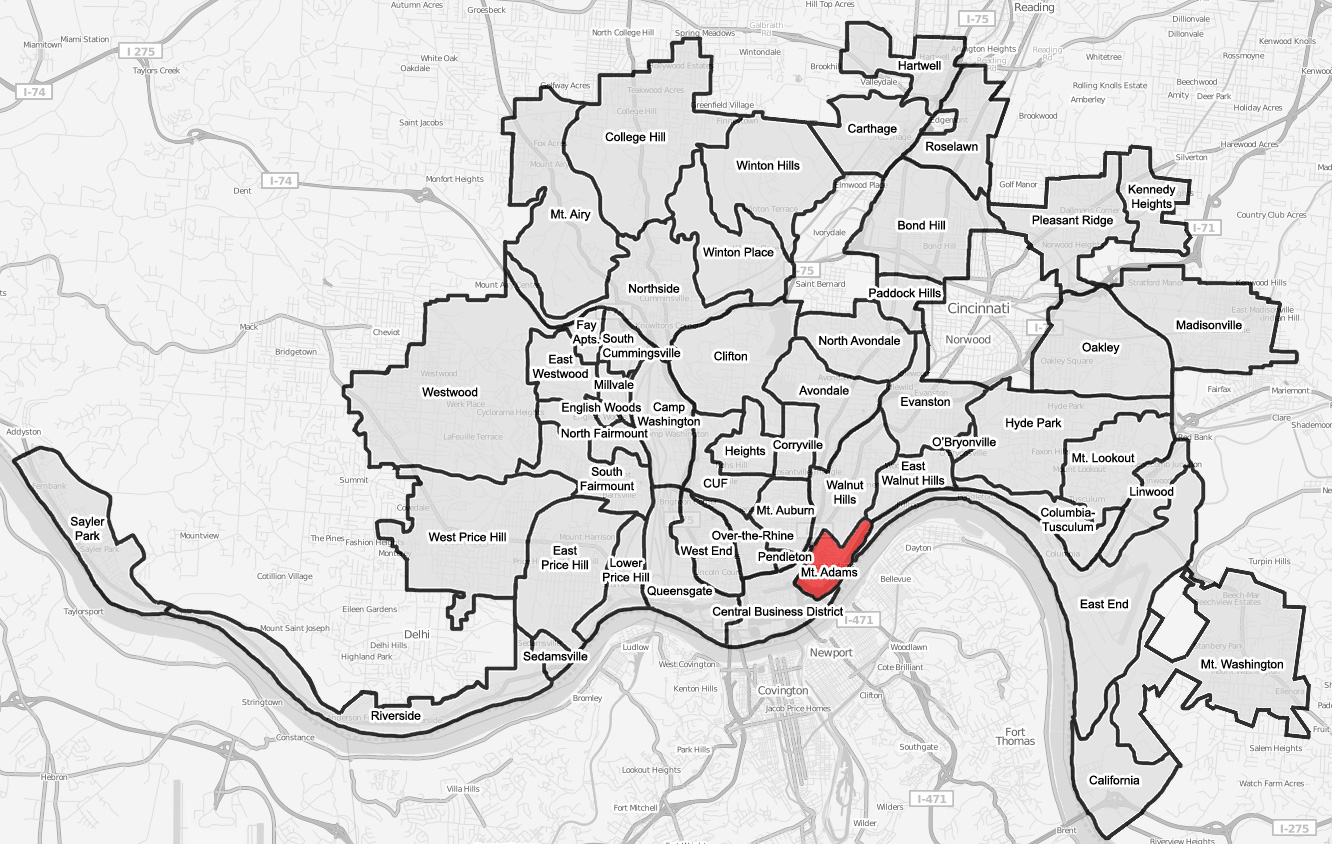
- Mount Adams (red) within Cincinnati
- Country: United States
- State: Ohio
- City: Cincinnati

Population (2020)
  - Total: 1,578
- Time zone: UTC-5 (EST)
  - Summer (DST): UTC-4 (EDT)
- ZIP code: 45202

Mount Adams is one of the 52 neighborhoods of Cincinnati, Ohio. Located on a hill immediately east of downtown Cincinnati, it is south of Walnut Hills, southwest of East Walnut Hills, and west of the East End. The population was 1,578 at the 2020 census.

Mount Adams is home to multiple local cultural institutions. Eden Park is located immediately north of the neighborhood. Located within the park is the Krohn Conservatory, Cincinnati Art Museum, and Playhouse in the Park.

== History ==
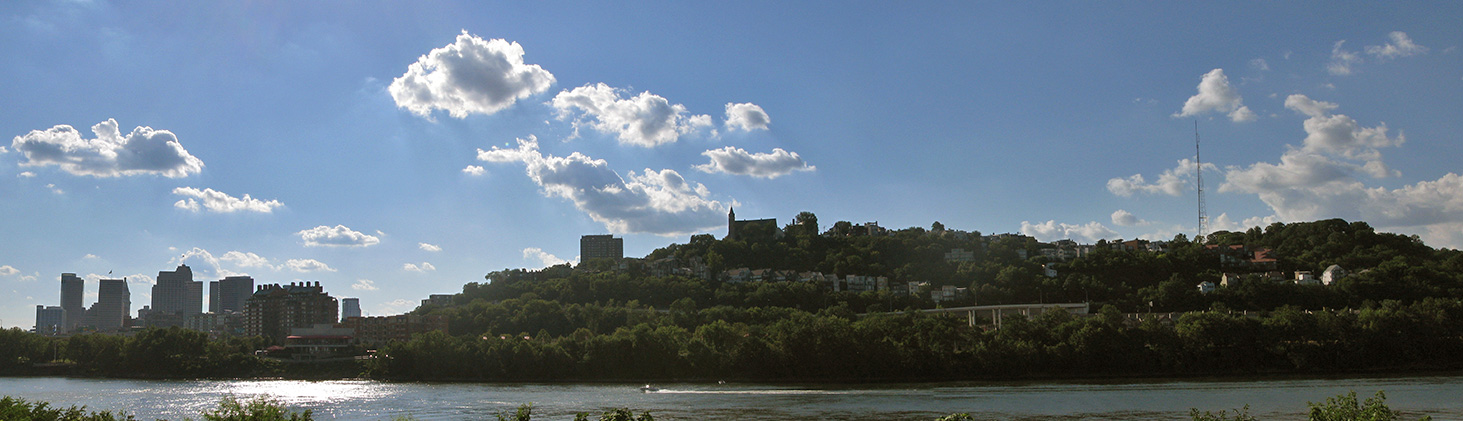
Mount Adams in the summer, with downtown to the west.

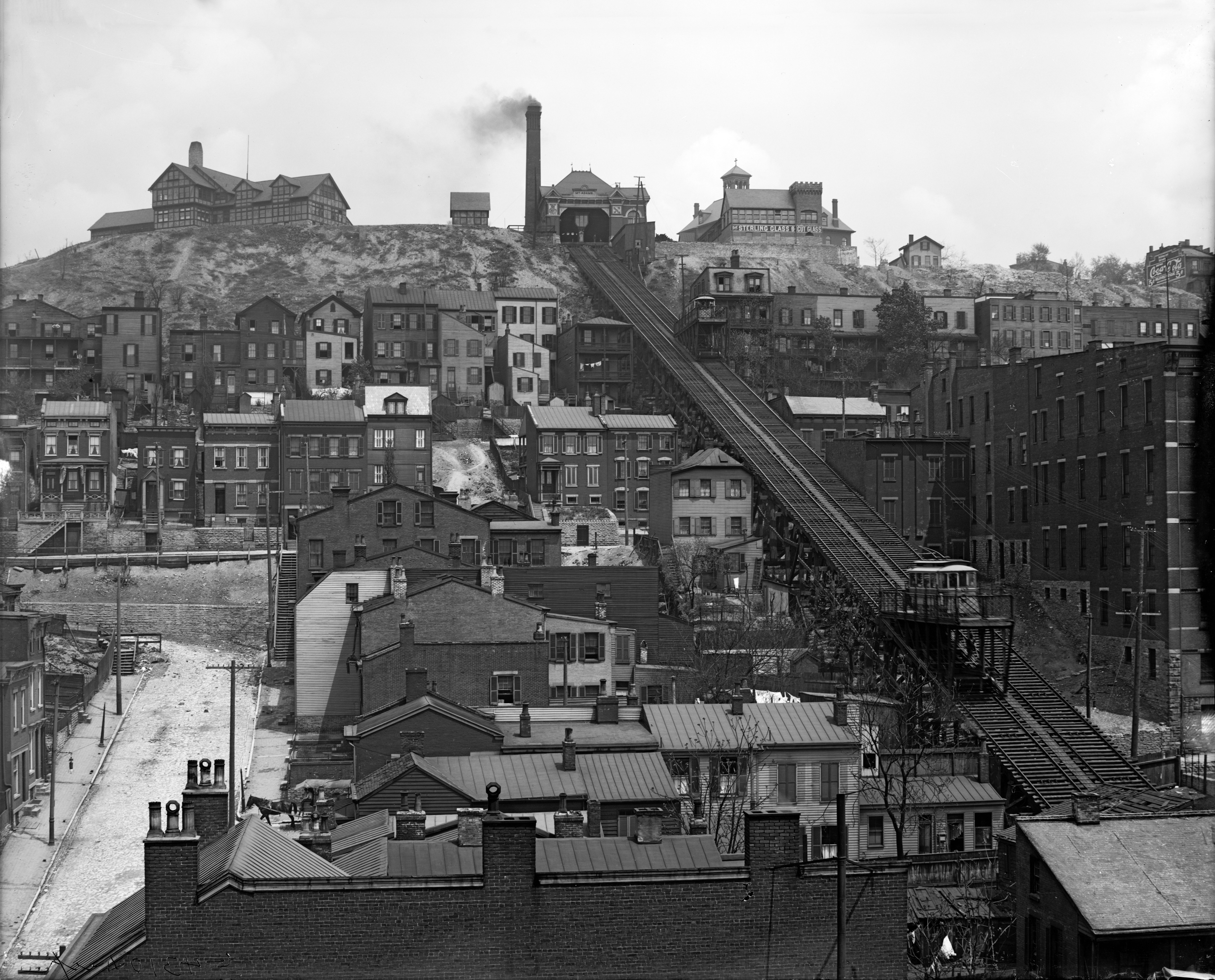
Mount Adams incline, circa 1905

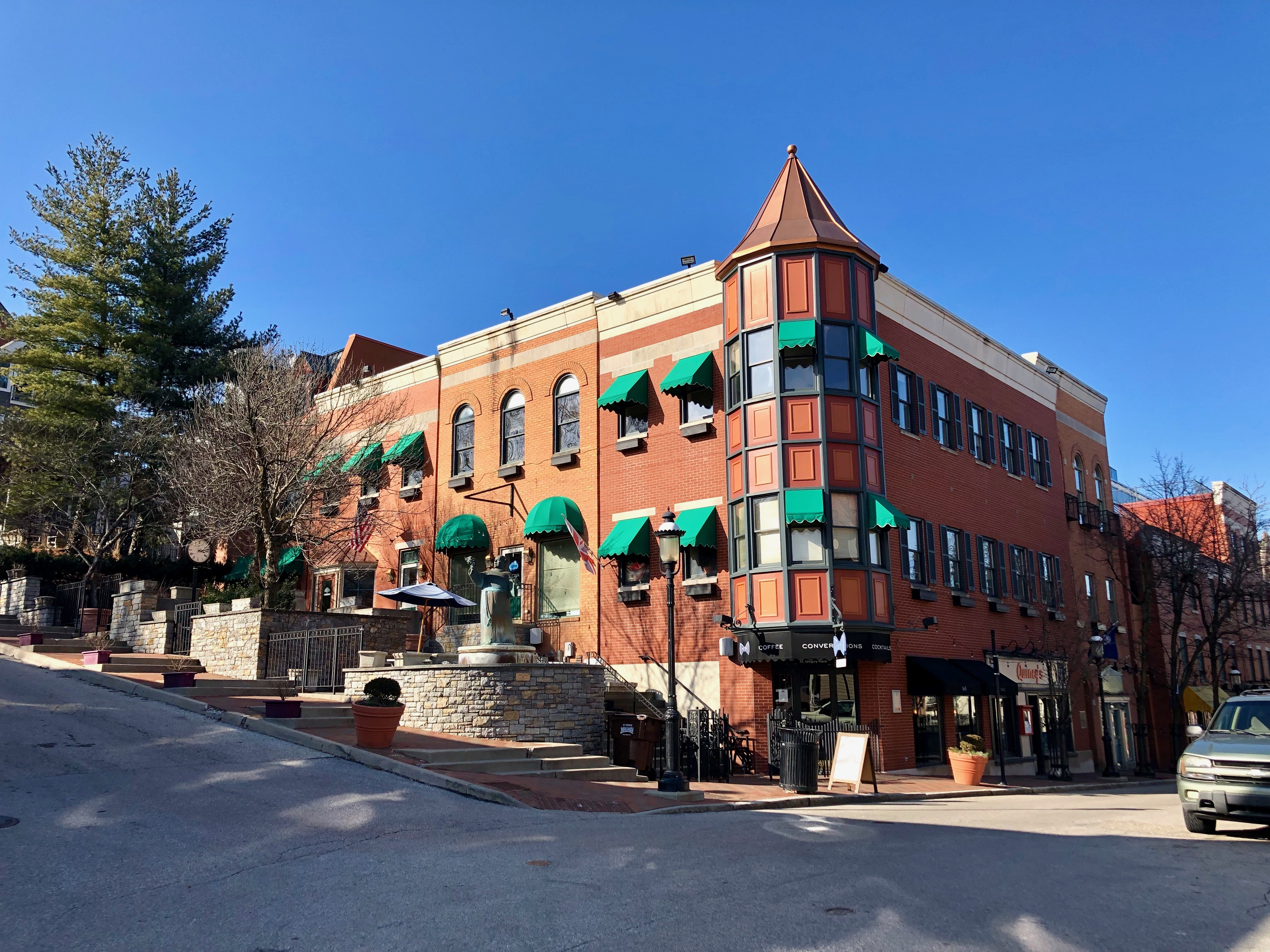
Mount Adams business district

Mount Adams was originally known as Mount Ida. The namesake was from Ida Martin, a washerwoman who lived in the hollow of an old sycamore tree located on a steep hill.

In the early 1800s the steep Mount Adams hillside was largely barren as early settlers had cut down all the trees for timber to construct their homes.

In 1831, Nicholas Longworth, a wealthy attorney, transformed the hill into a vineyard and purchased the mansion that is now the Taft Museum of Art and the large lot of land behind including barren Mount Adams. Longworth would become the first commercially successful winemaker in the United States and has been called the "Father of the American Wine Industry." During the 1830s and 1840s Longworth cultivated Catawba grapes, which were used in making his champagne known as Golden Wedding. The wine inspired Henry Wadsworth Longfellow to write the poem "Ode to the Catawba Wine." Contemporaries reported that Longworth's wine "transcends the Champagne of France." The winemaking industry around Cincinnati grew rapidly for several decades until it was virtually destroyed by downy mildew, powdery mildew, and black rot around 1860. The American Civil War created a shortage of manpower needed for vineyard labor, and the death of Longworth in 1863 furthered the end of Cincinnati's wine industry.

Allegedly to increase his property value, Longworth donated a portion of the hilltop to the Cincinnati Astronomical Society for an observatory. When the Cincinnati Observatory opened in 1843 it owned the most powerful telescope of its kind. The hill was renamed Mount Adams in honor of President John Quincy Adams, who delivered the observatory's dedication address. The observatory is still in operation today, though in 1871 it was moved to its current location in Mount Lookout due to excessive smoke from downtown buildings. The old observatory later became the Holy Cross Monastery and Church and expanded, but closed in 1977. The monastery is now the corporate headquarters of Towne Properties – a property management company.

Although Cincinnati was largely Presbyterian in its early history, Mount Adams was originally a strongly Catholic working-class community composed of the Germans and Irish. The first Protestant church of any denomination to be founded in that neighborhood was Pilgrim Presbyterian Church on Ida Street, near the Ida Street Viaduct.

During the American Civil War two artillery emplacements were installed on the hill to help defend the city from the Confederacy. One was installed at Fort View Place and the other near the present location of the Playhouse in the Park. Neither gun was ever fired.

The Mount Adams Incline was completed in 1872 and linked downtown Cincinnati with the hilltop community. The Highland House, the incline hilltop resort, was a popular entertainment venue. Around that time the hill became occupied by a working-class blue-collar population. The Incline was closed in 1948.

Then in 1892 Maria Longworth, granddaughter of Nicholas Longworth, opened Rookwood Pottery. Her work is still collected today.

In the late 1960s people began to gentrify the hilltop neighborhood, including workers who wanted to live near their downtown offices.

== Demographics ==
Population of Mt Adams 1880-2020
Year	Pop.	±%
1880	12,813	—
1890	13,938	+8.8%
1900	10,125	−27.4%
1910	10,975	+8.4%
1920	9,550	−13.0%
1930	9,267	−3.0%
1940	7,307	−21.2%
1950	7,437	+1.8%
1960	6,839	−8.0%
1970	3,455	−49.5%
1980	1,958	−43.3%
1990	1,569	−19.9%
2000	1,514	−3.5%
2010	1,481	−2.2%
2020	1,578	+6.5%
Wards were utilized from 1880-1890 which have slightly different boundaries from census tracts utilized from 1900-40.

As of the census of 2020, there were 1,578 people living in the neighborhood. There were 1,146 housing units. The racial makeup of the neighborhood was 87.3% White, 3.1% Black or African American, 0.1% Native American, 2.3% Asian, 0.0% Pacific Islander, 1.0% from some other race, and 6.2% from two or more races. 4.0% of the population were Hispanic or Latino of any race.

There were 975 households, out of which 36.1% were families. 52.9% of all households were made up of individuals.

7.3% of the neighborhood's population were under the age of 18, 76.9% were 18 to 64, and 15.8% were 65 years of age or older. 50.8% of the population were male and 49.2% were female.

According to the U.S. Census American Community Survey, for the period 2016-2020 the estimated median annual income for a household in the neighborhood was $99,125. About 0.0% of family households were living below the poverty line. About 82.9% had a bachelor's degree or higher.
