= Ida Street Viaduct =

Coordinates: 39°6′31.9″N 84°29′57.1″W

- U.S. National Register of Historic Places
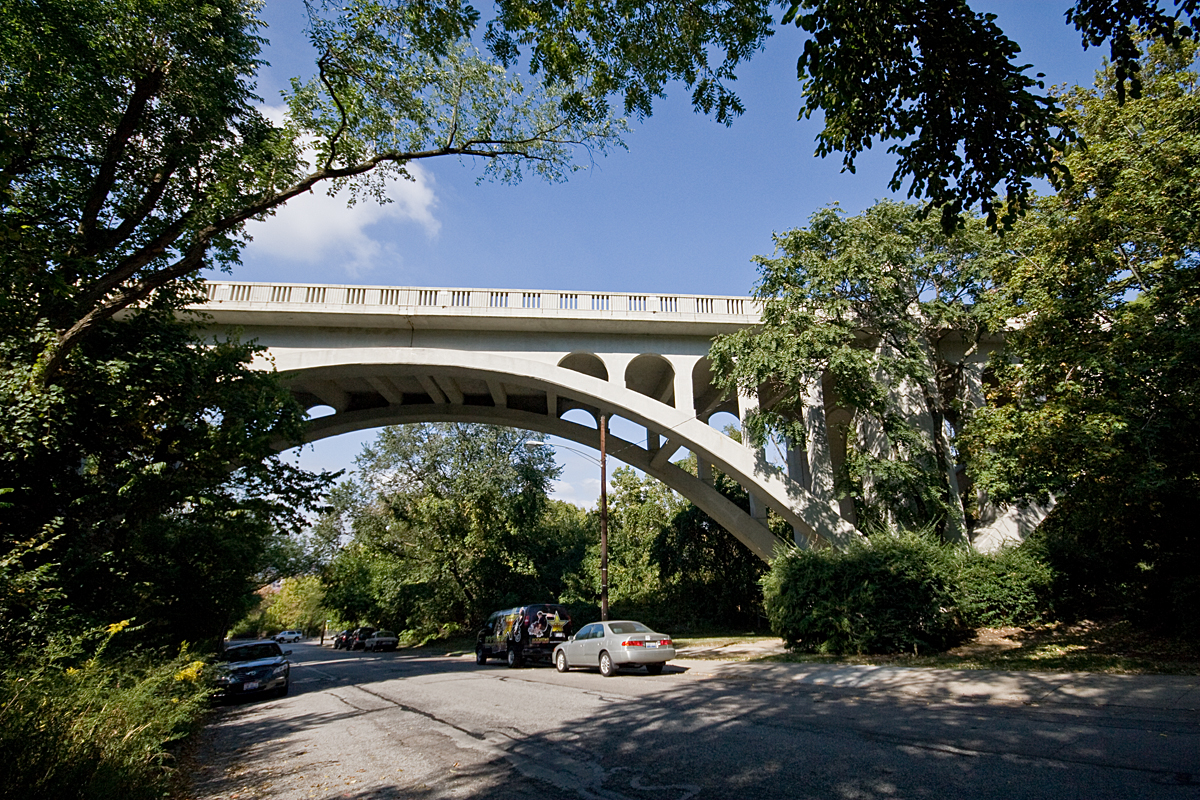
- Location: Cincinnati, Ohio
- Architect: J. R. Biedlinger
- Architectural style: Art Deco
- NRHP reference No.: 80003060
- Added to NRHP: November 28, 1980

Ida Street Viaduct is a registered historic structure in Cincinnati, Ohio, listed in the National Register on November 28, 1980. The reinforced concrete bridge is located in the hilltop neighborhood of Mount Adams.

The Ida Street Viaduct, constructed in 1931 in the Art Deco style, replaced a wooden trestle that carried Cincinnati streetcars.
