= Jim Pilgrim =

English footballer

Personal information
- Full name: James Ernest Pilgrim
- Date of birth: 1874
- Place of birth: Holmes, Lancashire, England
- Date of death: 1939 (aged 64–65)
- Position: Full back

Senior career*
Years	Team	Apps	(Gls)
1895–1896	Parkgate		
1896–1897	Thornhill United		
1897–1898	Rotherham Swifts		
1898–1899	Sheffield United	15	(0)
1899–1901	Chesterfield Town	54	(0)
1901–1902	Thornhill United		
1902	Rotherham Town		
Total		69	(0)
- * Club domestic league appearances and goals

James Ernest Pilgrim (1874 – 1939) was an English footballer who played in the Football League for Chesterfield Town and Sheffield United.
