= USS Pilgrim II =

Patrol vessel of the United States Navy

History

United States
- Name: USS Pilgrim II
- Namesake: Previous name retained
- Builder: John H. Mathis Company, Camden, New Jersey
- Completed: 1925
- Acquired: 24 March 1942
- In service: 28 April 1942
- Stricken: 10 June 1947
- Fate: Returned to owner 10 June 1947
- Notes: Operated as private houseboat Pilgrim II 1925-1942 and from 1947

General characteristics
- Type: Patrol vessel
- Displacement: 118 tons
- Length: 92 ft 5 in (28.17 m)
- Beam: 18 ft (5.5 m)
- Draft: 4 ft (1.2 m)

USS Pilgrim II (YFB-30) was a United States Navy motor launch employed as a river patrol boat during her naval service from 1942 to 1947.

Pilgrim II was built as a private motor houseboat of the same name in 1925 by the John H. Mathis Company at Camden, New Jersey, for William H. Elkins of Philadelphia, Pennsylvania. On 24 March 1942, the U.S. Navy acquired her from Elkins for use as a motor launch during World War II. Converted by the John H. Mathis Company at Camden for service as a river patrol boat, she was placed in service at the Philadelphia Navy Yard in Philadelphia on 28 April 1942 as USS Pilgrim II (YFB-30).

Assigned to the 4th Naval District and manned by a United States Coast Guard crew, Pilgrim II patrolled the Delaware River for the rest of World War II.

Pilgrim II was stricken from the Navy List on 10 June 1947 and returned to Elkins the same day.
