= Jane Pilgrim =

Trade Union Organiser

Jane Pilgrim is an English full-time trade union organiser working in the National Health Service for UNISON. She came to public attention in 2011 after criticising the government's health policies.

Full-time taxpayer-funded trade union officials have become known as "Pilgrims", with an Early Day Motion being introduced to the House of Commons condemning such practices. David Morris MP has raised the issue with the Health Secretary, while Alok Sharma MP asked a question of the Prime Minister. David Cameron responded that "It's nice work if you can get it!" Sharma has also sent Freedom of Information requests to all local councils to uncover how many "Pilgrims" are employed in local government, with the replies indicating at least £35m a year being spent,
