= Speed Walton =

American rapper

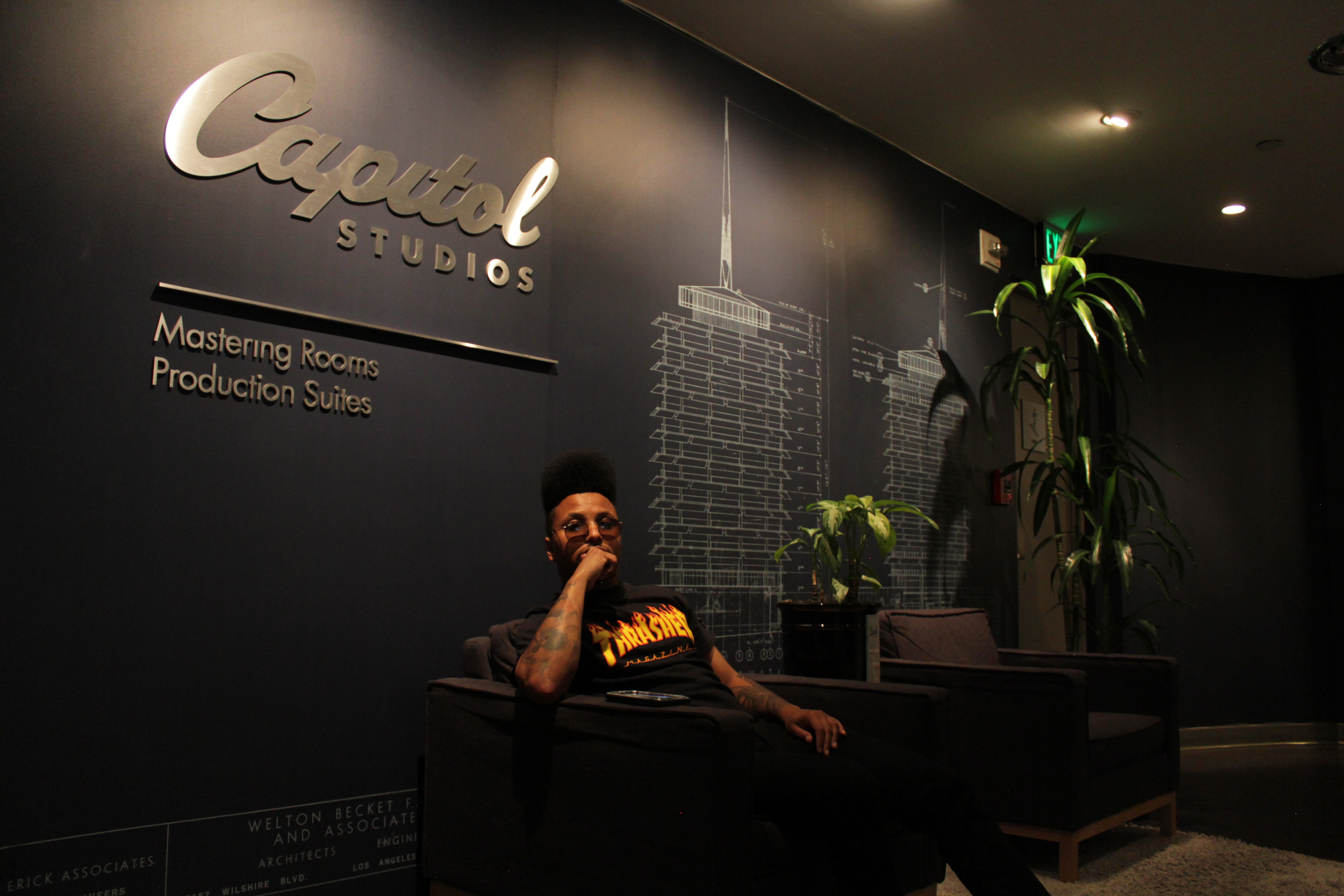
- Speed at Capitol Records

Background information
- Also known as: Buggs Tha Rocka
- Origin: Cincinnati, Ohio, United States
- Genre: Hip-Hop
- Years active: 2009- Present
- Label: Galaxxy Enterprise Javotti Media Capitol Records
- Website: https://www.realnamespeed.com/

Speed Walton is an American hip hop artist based in Cincinnati, Ohio. Speed gained recognition while using his previous stage name Buggs Tha Rocka. During that time, he released various underground mix-tapes and projects.

== Career ==
In 2009 Speed released Hip Hop Super Hero in collaboration with DJ Mick Boogie. Speed gained a social media presence and created a fan base which he refers to as “Space Invadaz.” In 2010 he released” Mutant Level 5. The project featured Little Brother, Freeway, Tanya Morgan and others.

In 2011 Speed formed the band Gold Shoes. The band consisted of a diverse group of musicians mostly drawn from Cincinnati. Due to the groups diversity, a influences in the music include jazz, classical, and funk. During this time he also performed solo hip-hop and teamed up with friend and Cincinnati native DJ Clock Work. Together they released the mix-tape Wrath of Zeus which assisted in winning a City Beat Cincinnati Entertainment Award (CEA) in 2012.

In 2014 he won another Cincinnati Entertainment Award for the release of the project “Scattered thoughts of an American poet”. During that year he was also invited by Talib Kweli to join his Prisoner of Conscious tour. In 2016 Speed signed with Talib’s Javotti Media along with fellow Cincinnati hip-hop artist Donte of MOOD as the Space Invadaz.

Speed is currently working on projects with Capitol Records and touring on the Talib Kweli Radio Silence tour.

== Early life ==
Speed was born in Cincinnati and was brought up in the neighborhood of Corryville. He lived with his grandmother, whom he referred to as "Big Momma", his older brother Jeremy, his mother Tanya, his aunt and five cousins. Speed had a strong relationship with his grandmother who played a critical role in introducing him to music.

Speed’s mother soon relocated to a troubled Cincinnati neighborhood called Northside with his younger brother Noel. He attended Kirby, Schwab, and Chase schools where he earned the nickname Buggs. He would later go on to Aiken High School and collaborate with his friends and classmates Charles Beataholic Reynolds (music producer), Fredrick Mango (A&R), Tawon Arnold (Hip-Hop Artist), and Herm.

== Personal life ==
Speed credits the music venues Bogart's and Sudsy Malones of Cincinnati as some of childhood musical influences. Speed is a member of the Moorish Science Temple. He is of Moorish descent.

== Discography ==
- Hip Hop Supa Hero 2009
- Mutant Level 5 2010
- Wrath of Zeus 2012
- Lost Luggage 2013
- Scattered Thoughts of an American Poet 2014
- Contact Space Invadaz 2016

== Awards ==
- Cincinnati Entertainment Award Hip Hop 2012-13 (Won)
- Cincinnati Entertainment Award Hip Hop 2014 (Won)
- Cincinnati Entertainment Award Hip Hop 2015 (Won)
- Cincinnati Entertainment Award Hip Hop 2016 (Won)
- Cincinnati Entertainment Award Hip Hop 2017 (Won)
