= The Aperture =

Restaurant in Cincinnati, Ohio, U.S.

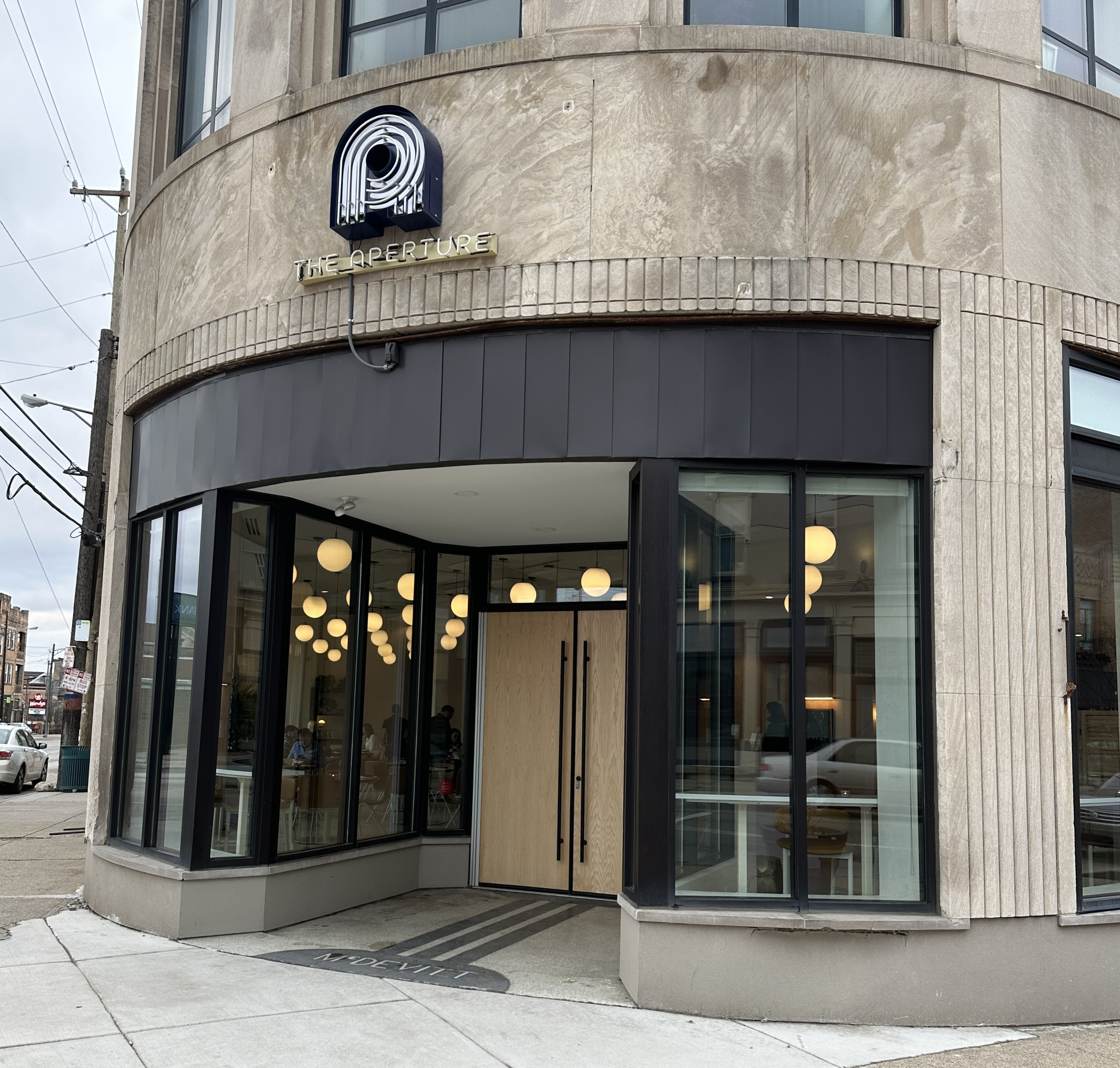
- Interactive map of The Aperture

Restaurant information
- Location: 900 E. McMillan St., Cincinnati, Ohio, 45206, United States
- Coordinates: 39°07′34″N 84°29′24″W

The Aperture is a restaurant in Cincinnati, Ohio, which opened in January 2024. The New York Times named it to their list of Best Restaurants in 2024.

In 2025 USA Today named it one of their Restaurants of the Year and chef owner Jordan Anthony-Brown was nominated for a James Beard Award for Best Emerging Chef.

== History ==
Chef and owner Jordan Anthony-Brown leased space in the Art Deco 1931 Paramount Building in 2019. Development was delayed because of the COVID-19 pandemic.

The restaurant, a Black-owned business, opened in January 2024.

== Description ==
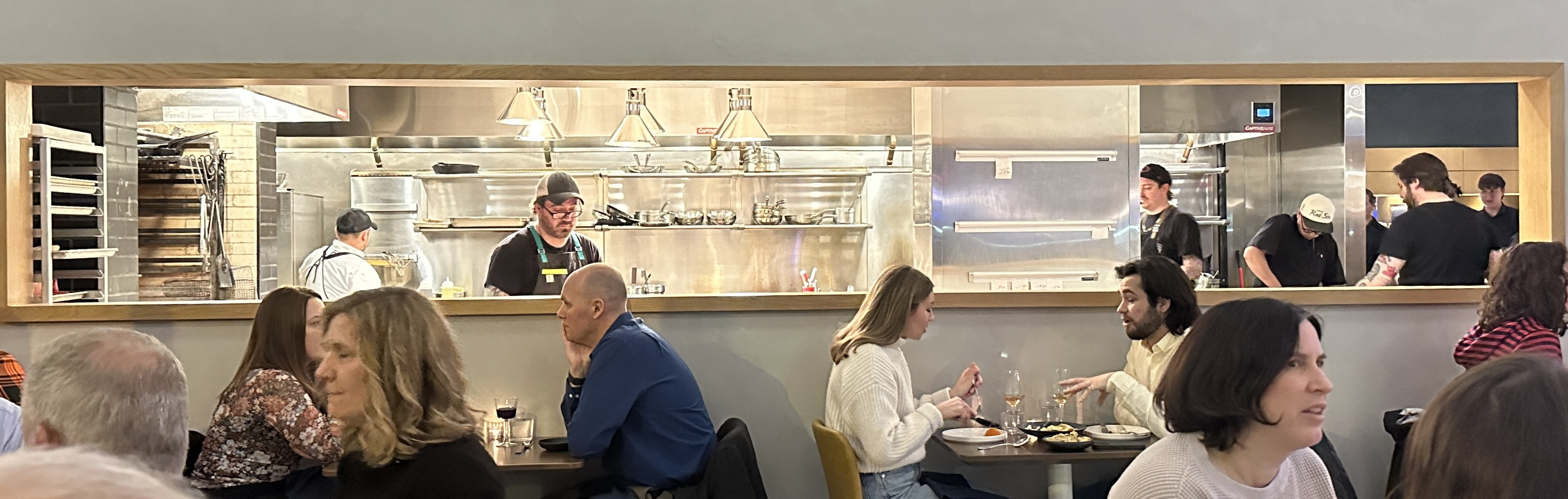
Open kitchen

The restaurant is located in Peebles' Corner, an historic district in the Walnut Hills neighborhood of Cincinnati. It features an open-fire kitchen and minimalist decor.

The menu is small and is inspired by Mediterranean cuisine. Dishes are served mezze-style.

As of September 2024 the restaurant was open Wednesday through Saturday for dinner.

== Ownership ==
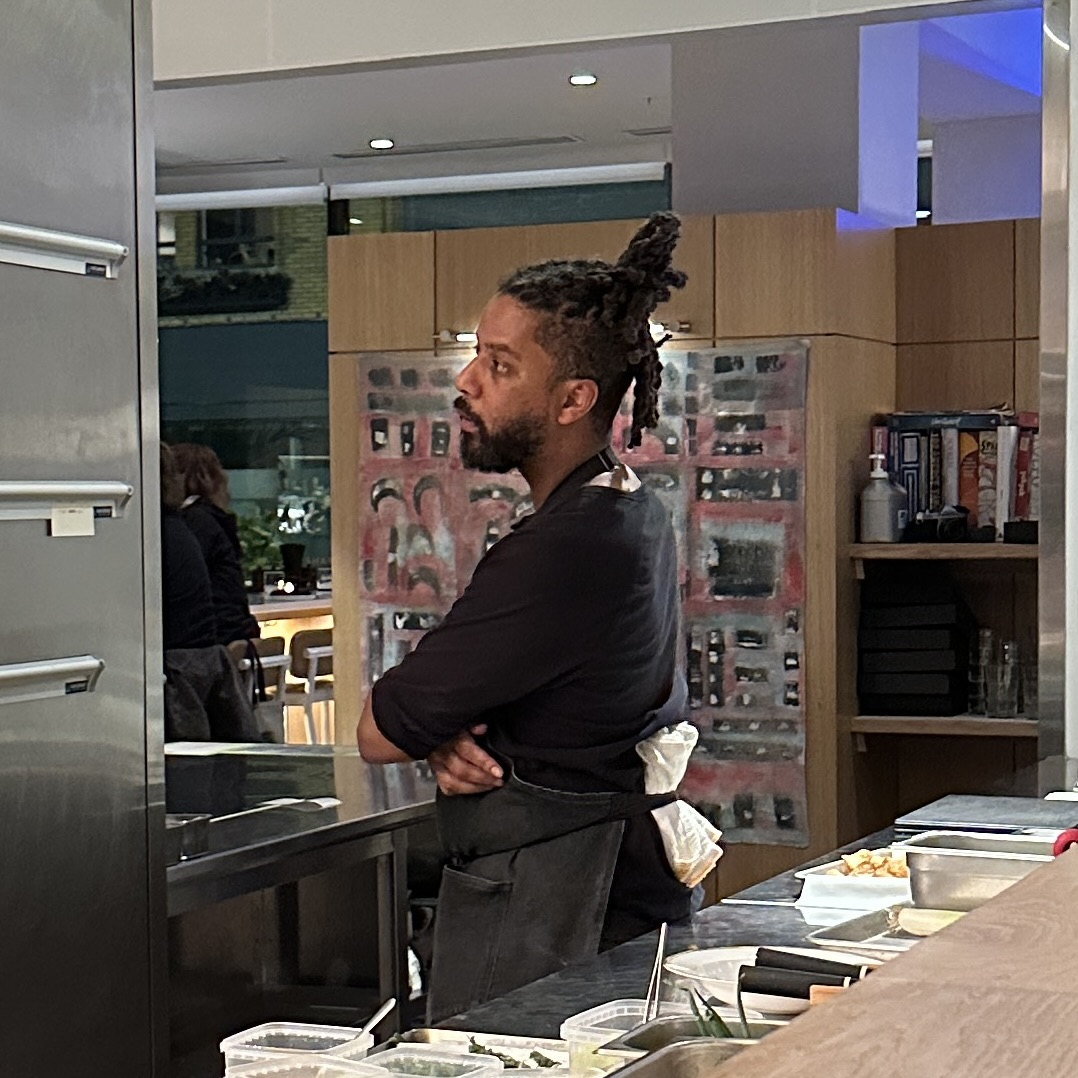
Jordan Anthony-Brown

The restaurant is owned by Jordan Anthony-Brown, who is also the chef.

== Recognition ==
The New York Times named it to their list of Best Restaurants in 2024. USA Today named it one of their 2025 Restaurants of the Year. Anthony-Brown was nominated for a 2025 James Beard Award for Best Emerging Chef.

In February 2024, shortly after it opened, Cincinnati CityBeat dining critic Pama Mitchell said it had "delivered my most memorable and satisfying Cincinnati dining experience in recent memory" and called the menu "ambitious but approachable".

== See also ==
- List of restaurants in Cincinnati
