= List of restaurants in Cincinnati =

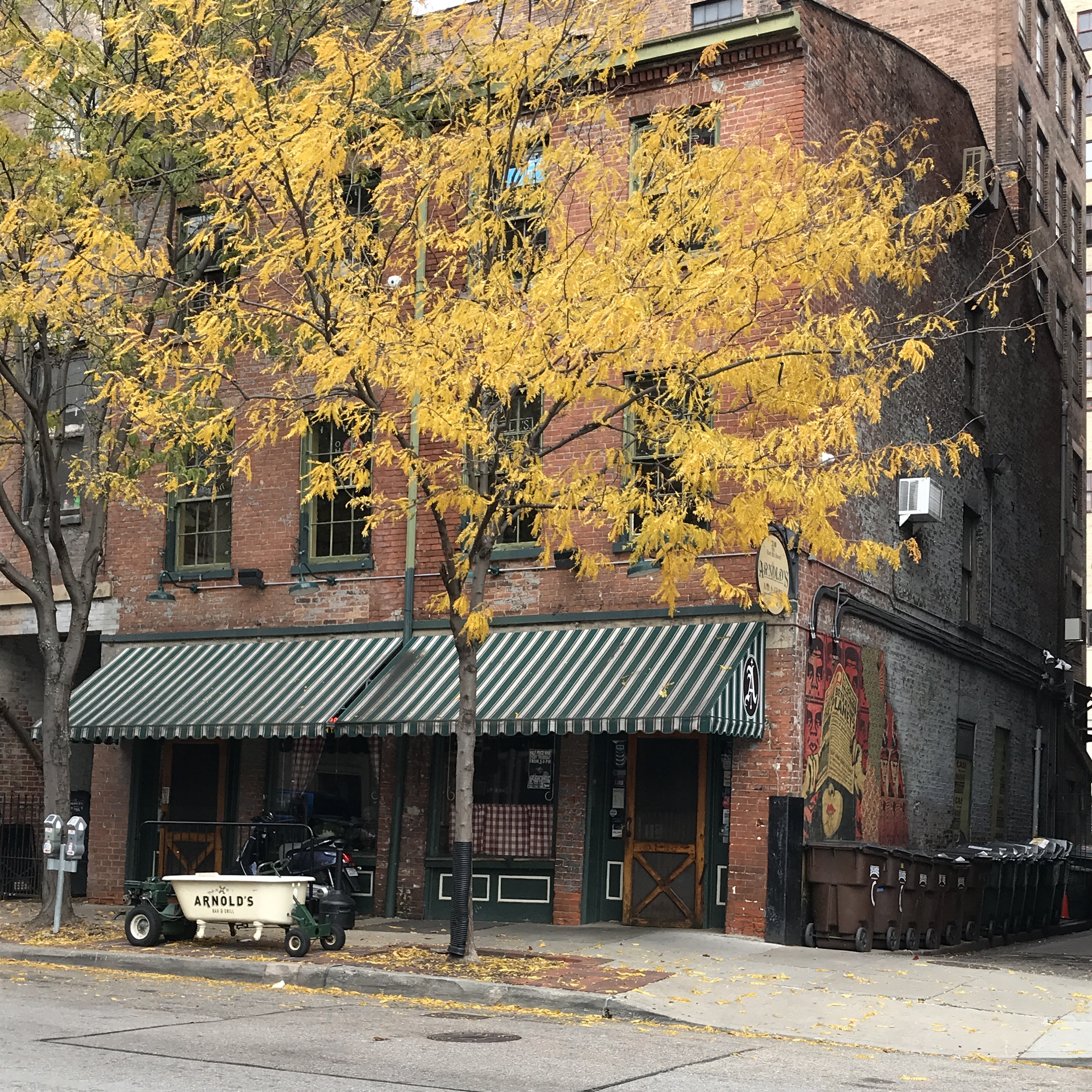
Arnold's Bar and Grill

The following is a list of notable restaurants in Cincinnati, Ohio:

- The Aperture
- Arnold's Bar and Grill
- Blue Chip Cookies
- Cafe Mochiko
- Camp Washington Chili
- Frisch's
- Gold Star Chili
- Gourmet Room
- Graeter's
- LaRosa's Pizzeria
- The Maisonette
- Mecklenburg's Garden
- Penn Station
- Skyline Chili
- Wielert's
