= Gilbert–Sinton Historic District =

Historic district in the United States

- U.S. National Register of Historic Places
- U.S. Historic district
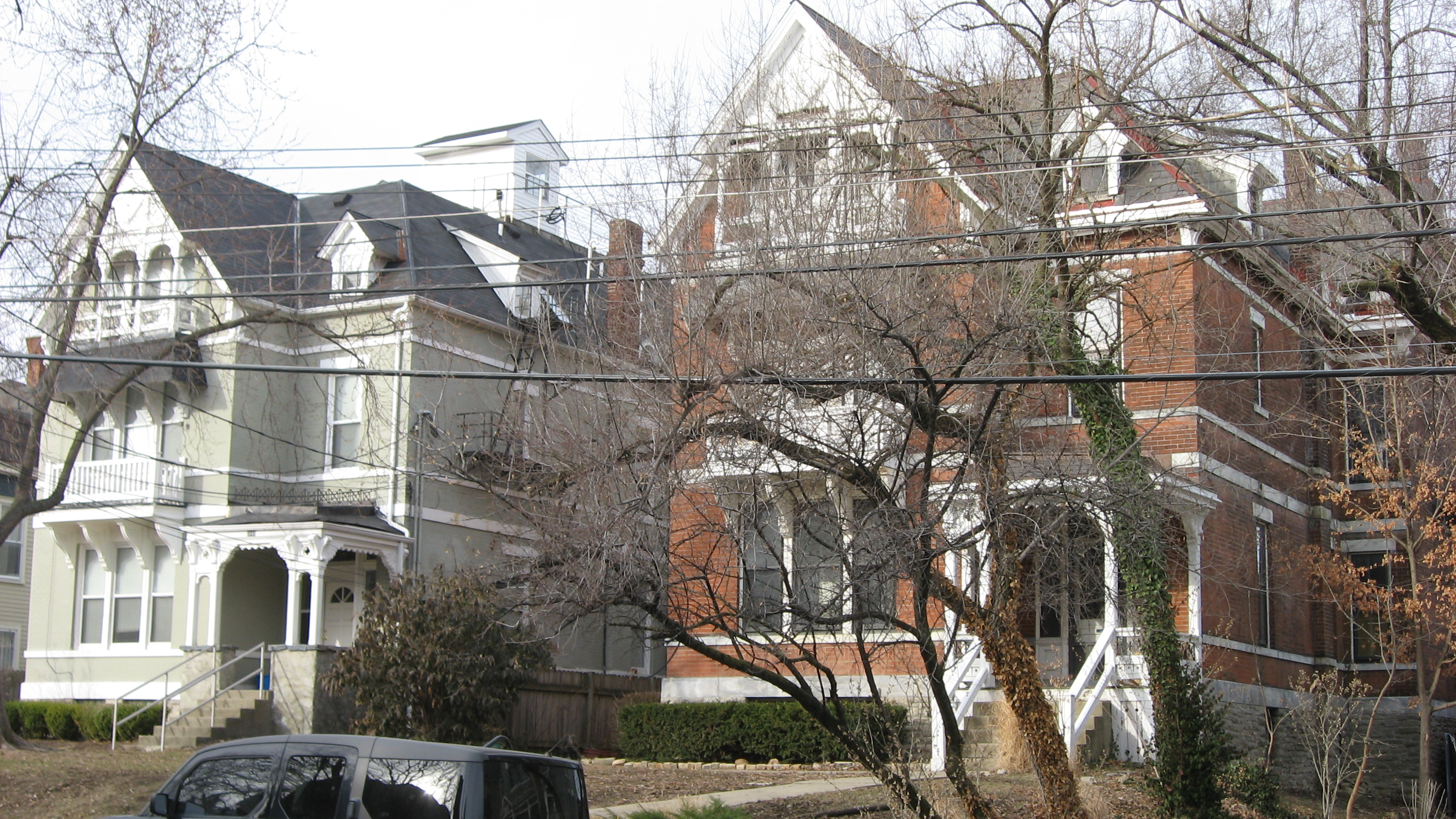
- Houses in the district

- Location within Ohio Location within the United States
- Location: Roughly bounded by Morris, Gilbert, and Sinton Aves., Cincinnati, Ohio
- Coordinates: 39°7′9″N 84°29′37″W
- Area: 13.2 acres (5.3 ha)
- Built: 1880
- Architect: Multiple
- Architectural style: Queen Anne, Shingle
- NRHP reference No.: 83004306
- Added to NRHP: October 6, 1983

The Gilbert–Sinton Historic District is an area in the southern portion of the Walnut Hills neighborhood of Cincinnati, Ohio, United States. A triangle measuring slightly more than 13 acres (5.3 ha) in area, the district's edges are generally Morris Street and Sinton Avenue (both small residential streets) and the substantially larger Gilbert Avenue, which is concurrently designated as U.S. Route 22 and State Route 3.

Most of the district was created by a small group of real estate developers working in conjunction with each other. As a result, none of the present buildings were constructed before 1880, and little construction occurred after the turn of the 20th century. Additionally, the architecture is relatively homogenous: most of the buildings are large residences constructed as homes for the wealthy, and the architectural styles exhibited in the district (which is predominantly Queen Anne and Shingle style) feature similar components and designs.

In its early years, life in the present-day Gilbert–Sinton neighborhood was accompanied by plentiful amenities. When public transportation was initially established in the area, its first route ran along Sinton Avenue, and Cincinnati's first cable car line used Gilbert Avenue. Neighborhoods all along this pioneer cable car route expanded rapidly, and Gilbert–Sinton was no exception. Even today, the impact of these early public transportation routes is evident in the neighborhood. Residents did not need to travel for entertainment; besides being the district's southern boundary, Morris Street is the northern boundary of the large Eden Park.

In 1983, the Gilbert–Sinton neighborhood was named a historic district and listed on the National Register of Historic Places. Eighty-seven of the district's ninety buildings were counted as contributing properties. Among these properties are the Gilbert Row along Gilbert Avenue and a pair of buildings known as Madam Fredin's Eden Park School and Neighboring Row House on Morris Street, which had already been listed on the National Register in 1982 and 1979 respectively.

== See also ==
- Streetcars in Cincinnati
