= Cafe Mochiko =

Restaurant in Cincinnati, Ohio, U.S.

- Interactive map of Cafe Mochiko

Restaurant information
- Location: Cincinnati, Ohio, United States
- Coordinates: 39.12987°N 84.47781°W
- Website: cafemochiko.com

Cafe Mochiko is a restaurant in Cincinnati, in the U.S. state of Ohio.

In 2024, the business was included in The New York Times's list of the 22 best bakeries in the U.S.

== See also ==
- List of restaurants in Cincinnati
