= Kathy Y. Wilson =

American columnist, author, playwright, and commentator

- Born: United States
- Died: November 22, 2022; United States
- Occupations: Journalist, columnist, playwright, commentator
- Parent(s): Clarence Wilson; Gladine Parrish

Kathy Y. Wilson (d. November 22, 2022) was an American journalist, columnist, playwright, and commentator. She was the creator of an opinion column, a 2004 non-fiction book and a one-woman play all titled Your Negro Tour Guide.

== Early life and education ==
Wilson was born to Clarence Wilson, a steel worker, and Gladine Parrish, a nurse. She has two older brothers and a younger half-sister. She spent her childhood in Hamilton, Ohio, before her parents divorced and her mother left with the children, eventually settling in Forest Park, Ohio. She graduated from Greenhills High School. She attended the University of Cincinnati but didn't graduate.

== Career ==
She worked for five years as a reporter for the Hamilton JournalNews and described editors sending her out on "black stories."

Between 1999 and 2007 she created an opinion column, a nonfiction book and a one-woman play all titled Your Negro Tour Guide. Wilson wrote the column for alternative weekly City Beat from 1999 through 2006 and 2012 to 2015; the title refers to a retort she made to white former coworkers' questions about Black culture when Wilson was the only Black person in the newsroom.

Wilson was a commentator for National Public Radio. She wrote for City Beat, Cincinnati Magazine, and the Cincinnati Enquirer. She taught at the University of Cincinnati.

In 2014 she was the Cincinnati Public Library's first Writer-in-Residence. She was awarded the 2016 ArtsWave Sachs Fund Prize.

As of 2018 she was a senior editor at Cincinnati Magazine and an adjunct professor in University of Cincinnati's Women’s Studies department. She was a regular contributor of commentary on NPR's All Things Considered. She was twice a fellow for the Knight Center for Specialized Journalism at the University of Maryland.

In 2018 a recreation of Wilson's apartment was featured as an exhibit, "Sanctuary: Kathy Y. Wilson Living in a Colored Museum" at the Weston Gallery at the Aronoff Center for the Arts.

She authored two other books, Your Negro City Guide and True Grits: A Short Stack of Food and Family in Over the Rhine.

=== Productions of stage adaptation ===
Wilson's stage adaptation of Your Negro Tour Guide was produced by Cincinnati's Playhouse in the Park in 2007 and by Valdosta State University in 2008. VSU Sociology professor Tracy Woodward Meyers said, "the show deconstructs and lampoons gender, race, class, and sexuality in America.” It was produced that same year by the National Women's Studies Association. It was produced in 2011 by the University of Kentucky. It was produced for the 2012 Cincinnati Fringe Festival.

== Reception ==
Publishers Weekly said "her writing works best when it's crackling and clipped". Pittsburgh City Paper describes her as 'writing carefree of the "white gaze." ' The Cincinnati Enquirer called her the city's "unofficial conscience." Tony Norman said, "Wilson's use of language is a virtual bouillabaisse of postmodern negritude, political cunning and psychological insight." In July 2020, during the fallout from the murder of George Floyd, Cincinnati Magazine named the book one of five must-read books by local Black authors. The Cincinnati Enquirer called her "one of Cincinnati's most fearless 21st-century writers."

== Personal life ==
Wilson was a lesbian. She lived in the Walnut Hills neighborhood of Cincinnati with her partner, Kandice. She wrote and spoke about her father's pedophilia conviction.

In July 2020 she had a kidney transplant. Wilson died November 22, 2022, of kidney failure.
