= Walnut Hills United Presbyterian Church =

Historic church tower

- U.S. National Register of Historic Places
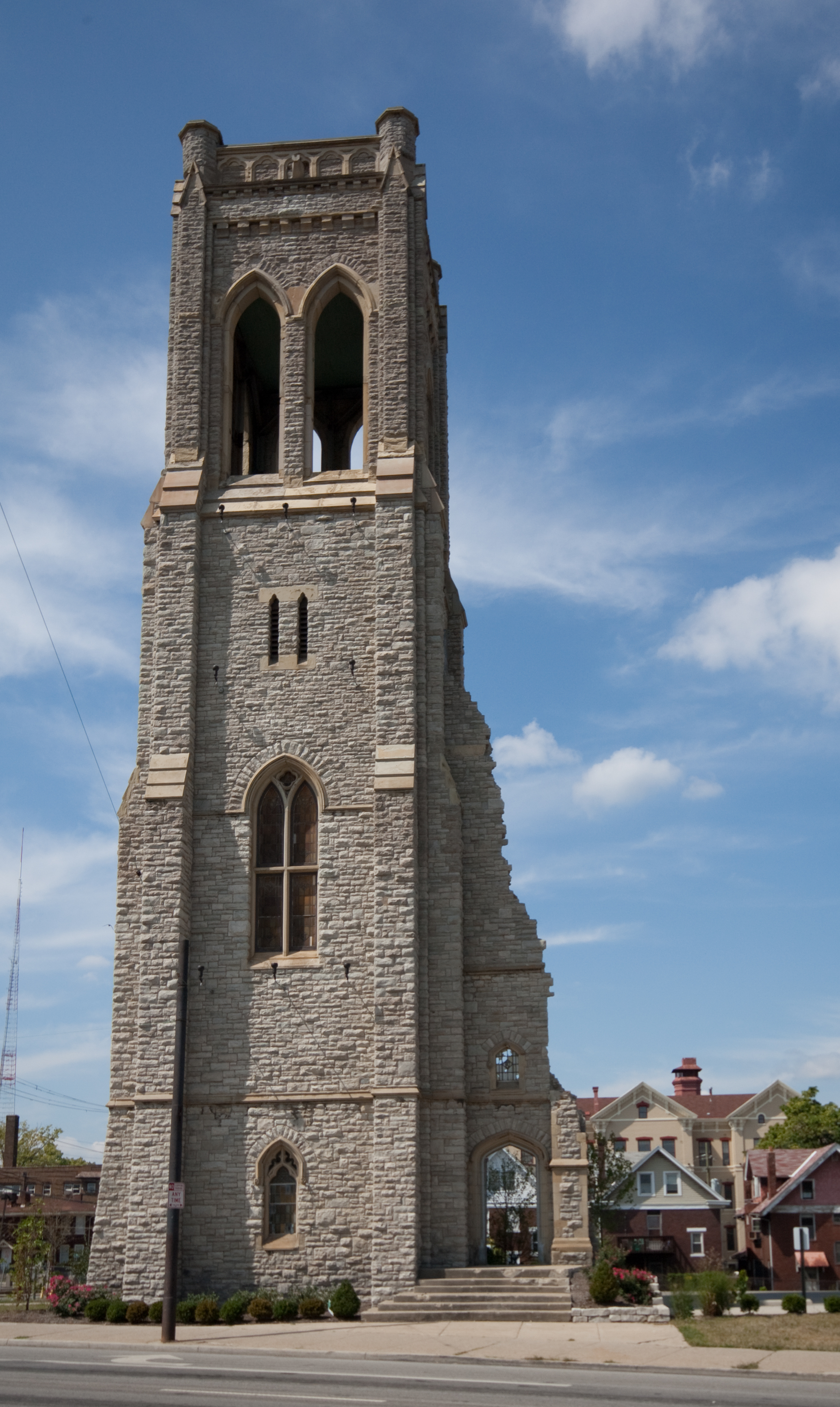
- Eastern side of the tower

- Location within Ohio Location within the United States
- Location: 2601 Gilbert Avenue, Cincinnati, Ohio
- Coordinates: 39°7′39.5″N 84°29′22.5″W
- Area: Less than 1 acre (0.40 ha)
- Built: 1880
- Architect: Samuel Hannaford; J. Griffith
- Architectural style: Gothic Revival
- MPS: Samuel Hannaford and Sons TR in Hamilton County
- NRHP reference No.: 80003089
- Added to NRHP: March 3, 1980

Walnut Hills United Presbyterian Church is a historic church tower in the Walnut Hills neighborhood of Cincinnati, Ohio, United States. The last remnant of a landmark church building, it was designed by a leading Cincinnati architect and built in the 1880s. Although named a historic site a century after its construction, the building was mostly destroyed after extensive neglect caused restoration to become prohibitively expensive.

== History ==
Pioneer Presbyterian minister James Kemper helped to organize a Presbyterian congregation in the area of Walnut Hills in 1818. After sixty years, the congregation merged with another one, which worshipped at the nearby Lane Theological Seminary, and before long the united congregation needed a larger building. Prominent architect Samuel Hannaford was chosen to produce the design. Hannaford had already gained a reputation as one of Cincinnati's best architects, following his production of Music Hall in the 1870s, and the city's growth provided plenty of demand for the services of such an architect; by the late 1870s, he had already completed designs for churches such as St. George's Catholic Church and St. Luke's Episcopal Church. His design for the Presbyterians in Walnut Hills resembled some of the others, with a large corner tower, a prominent steeple with spire, walls faced with ashlar, and a general Gothic Revival appearance. It was twice expanded: a chapel was constructed in 1891, and Hannaford's company added a larger section in 1929, but these additions had been removed by the late 1970s.

By the early 2000s, the building was no longer used for ecclesiastical purposes; preservation groups attempted to find a buyer to renovate it, suggesting that it be used for purposes such as a community center or offices for a film production firm. However, the building was ultimately destroyed: the neighboring funeral home needed the land in order to expand its parking lot, while the building's condition was poor enough that restoration seemingly would have required millions of dollars. Deconstruction began in early 2003, with the removal of stained glass and asbestos, and the building was largely demolished by mid-year. Preservationists were able to save part of the building, paying $160,000 to buy the church's tower and arrange to except it from demolition; their goal has been to ensure its structural stability and create a small monument around it, ensuring the church's partial continuation in the neighborhood's built environment.

== Architecture ==
Although faced with stone, the church was actually built of brick on a stone foundation and covered with a slate roof. Two and a half stories tall, it was constructed with an irregular floor plan, while the exterior walls rose to a large gable near the bell tower on the corner. Dominating the fenestration was a massive stained glass window in the gable, while the tower features Gothic windows on its lower stories and paired openings to the un-windowed belfry at its top. The spire is no longer in place on the tower; like the chapel and other additions, it had been removed by the late 1970s. Remaining in place next to the tower is an entrance, which prior to demolition sat in front of the church's four-bay southern side. Scattered other components of the building survived its demolition: part of the pulpit was given to a church in Ripley, the cornerstone from the 1818 church building was donated to other Presbyterians in the area, and numerous structural elements such as woodworking and stained glass were sold to members of the public.

== Historic site ==
In 1980, the church building was listed on the National Register of Historic Places, qualifying because of its historically significant architecture; it was part of a group of more than fifty Hannaford-designed buildings submitted to the Register together as part of a multiple property submission. Its historic site status could not prevent its demolition: National Register designation places no restrictions on private owners' right to modify or destroy their properties, and neither the city of Cincinnati nor Hamilton County had given the church any legal protections. More than ten years after demolition, the entire building remains on the National Register.
