= Gilbert Row =

Historic house in Ohio, United States

- U.S. National Register of Historic Places
- U.S. Historic district – Contributing property
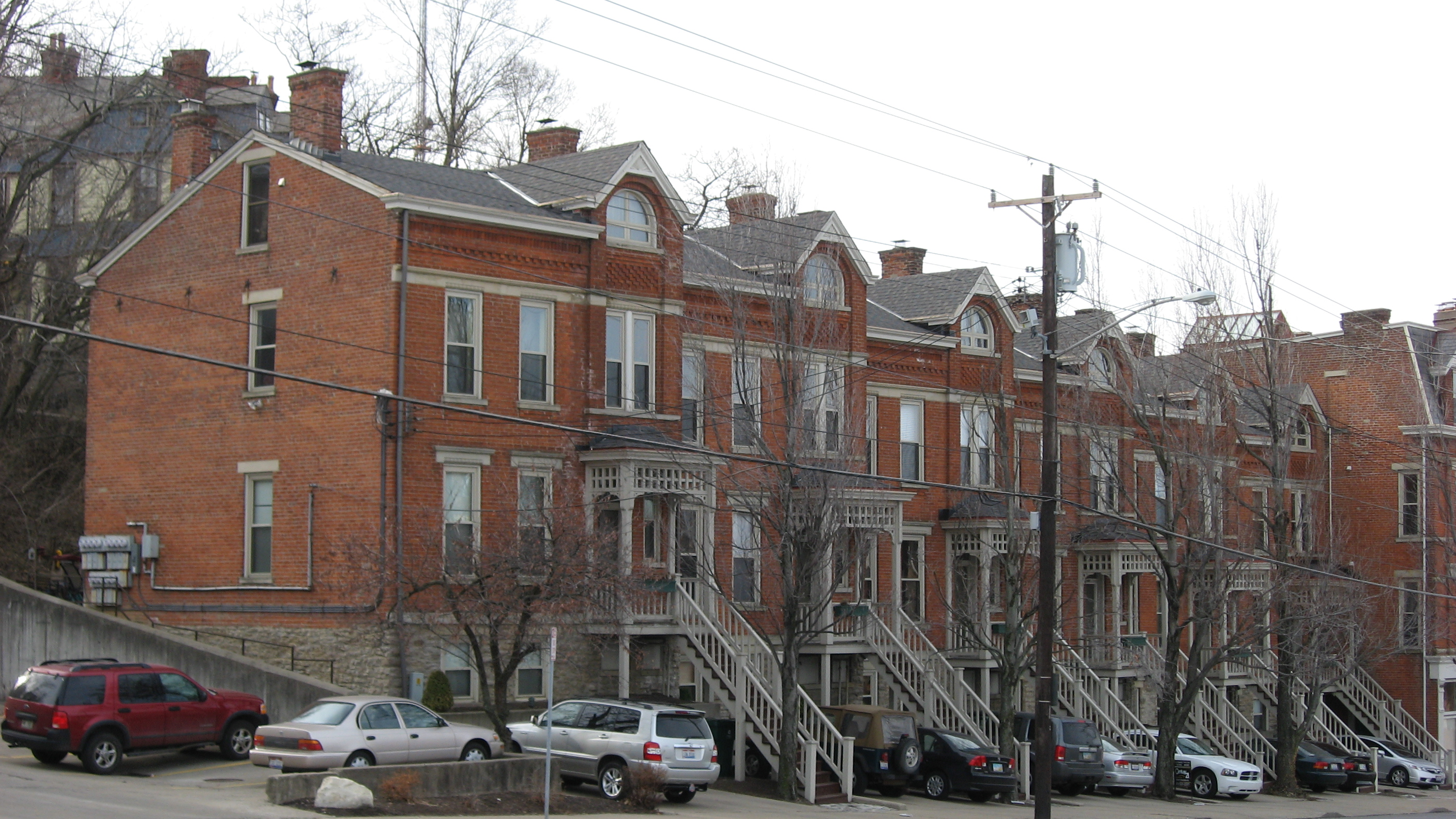
- Houses in the row

- Location within Ohio Location within the United States
- Location: 2152-2166 Gilbert Ave., Cincinnati, Ohio
- Coordinates: 39°7′12″N 84°29′39″W
- Area: Less than 1 acre (0.40 ha)
- Built: 1889
- Architect: Joseph Steinkamp & Brothers; Thomas Emery's Sons
- Architectural style: Queen Anne
- Part of: Gilbert-Sinton Historic District (ID83004306)
- NRHP reference No.: 82003579
- Added to NRHP: May 13, 1982

The Gilbert Row, as of 2005 often referred to as Emery Row, is a group of historic rowhouses in the southern part of the Walnut Hills neighborhood of Cincinnati, Ohio, United States. Composed of six individual small houses and a more substantial structure designed as a commercial building, the row was built by the real estate firm of Thomas Emery's Sons according to a design by the Steinkamp Brothers architectural firm. Built in 1889, the complex became a model for many residential complexes constructed by Thomas Emery's Sons during the 1890s, including multiple apartment-style properties in Walnut Hills.

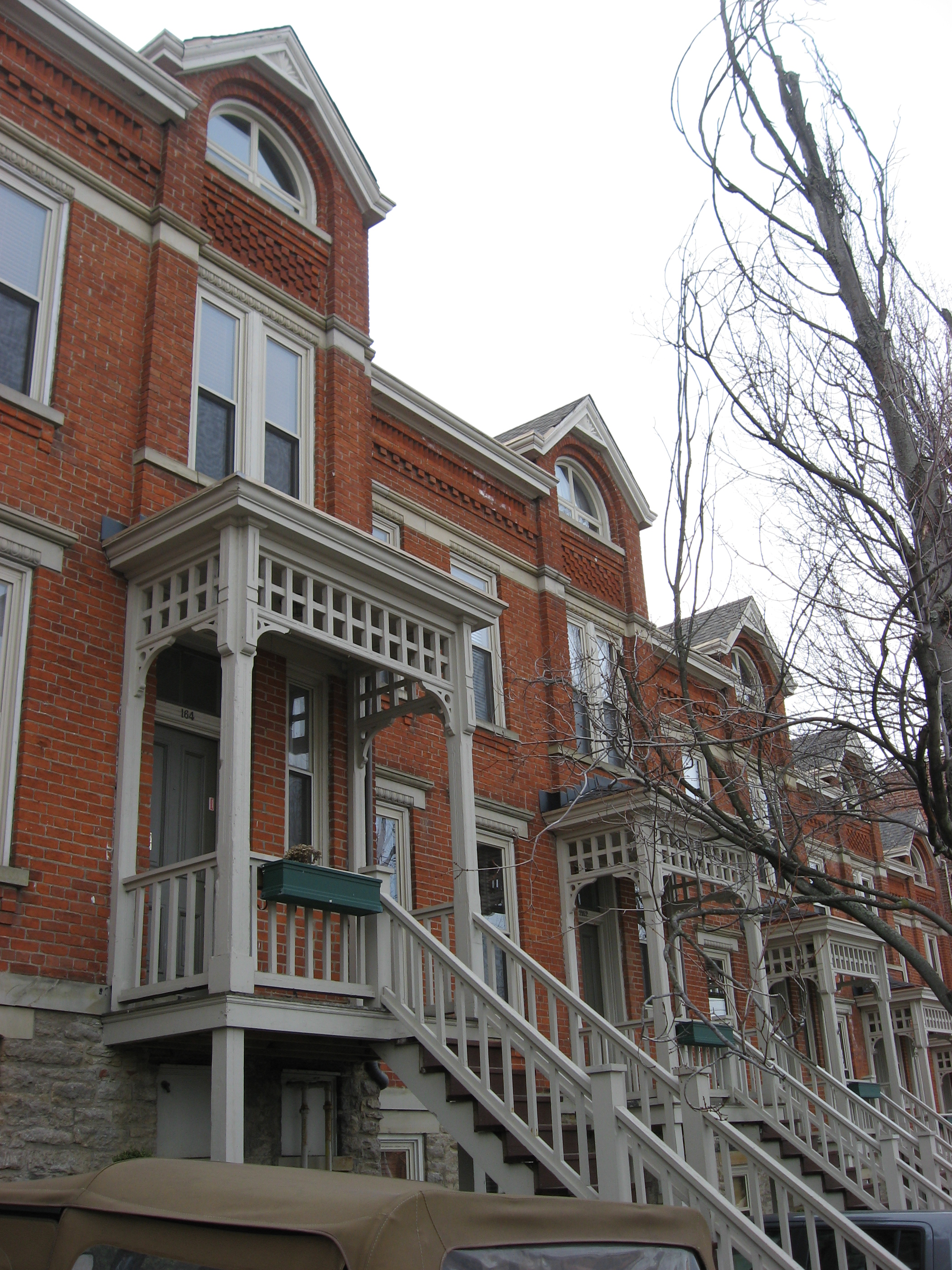
Stairs and porches in the row

Buildings in the Gilbert Row are generally constructed on foundations of stone; their walls are built of brick or iron, and they feature other elements of brick and stone. Most buildings in the group do not feature iron: it is only present in the cast iron front of the building constructed as a store. Typical houses in the row feature porches with hip roofs, wooden posts with chamfered and reeded details, lattice-shaped valences, and ornamental brackets. Setting the complex apart from almost all other groups of rowhouses in the city is its general architectural style: it is a clear example of the Queen Anne style of architecture, which was rarely employed in the construction of rowhouses in Cincinnati.

In May 1982, the Gilbert Row was listed on the National Register of Historic Places; it qualified for inclusion because of its well preserved and historically significant architecture, which was seen as important throughout the local area. Little more than a year later, a portion of southern Walnut Hills bounded by Morris, Gilbert, and Sinton Avenues was designated a historic district, the Gilbert-Sinton Historic District, and listed on the National Register, and the buildings of the Gilbert Row were among the district's contributing properties.

The structure underwent a complete renovation between May 2005 and November 2006, transforming the building into 12 townhomes and 6 condominiums.
