= Corryville, Cincinnati =

Coordinates: 39°7′57″N 84°30′10″W

Corryville
- Neighborhood of Cincinnati
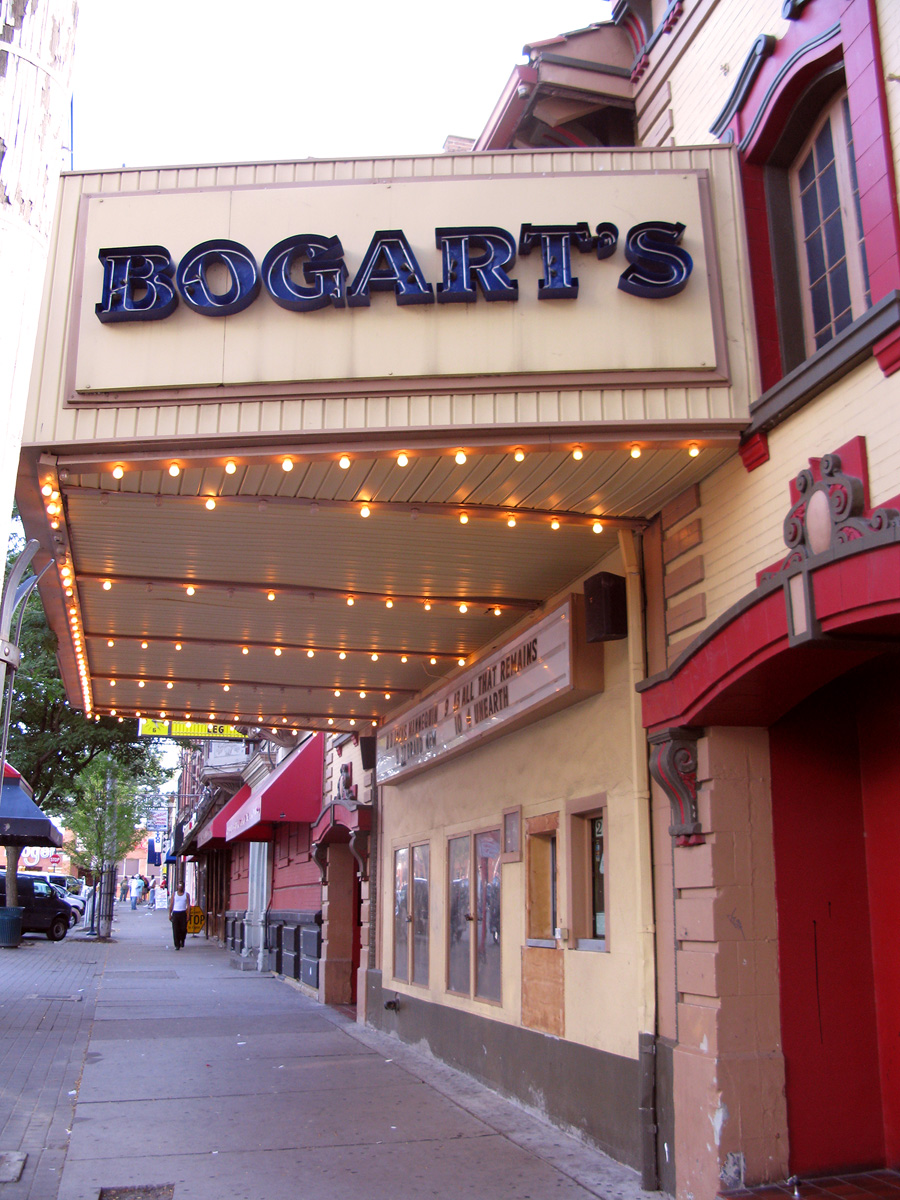
- Bogart's on Short Vine in Corryville

- Flag

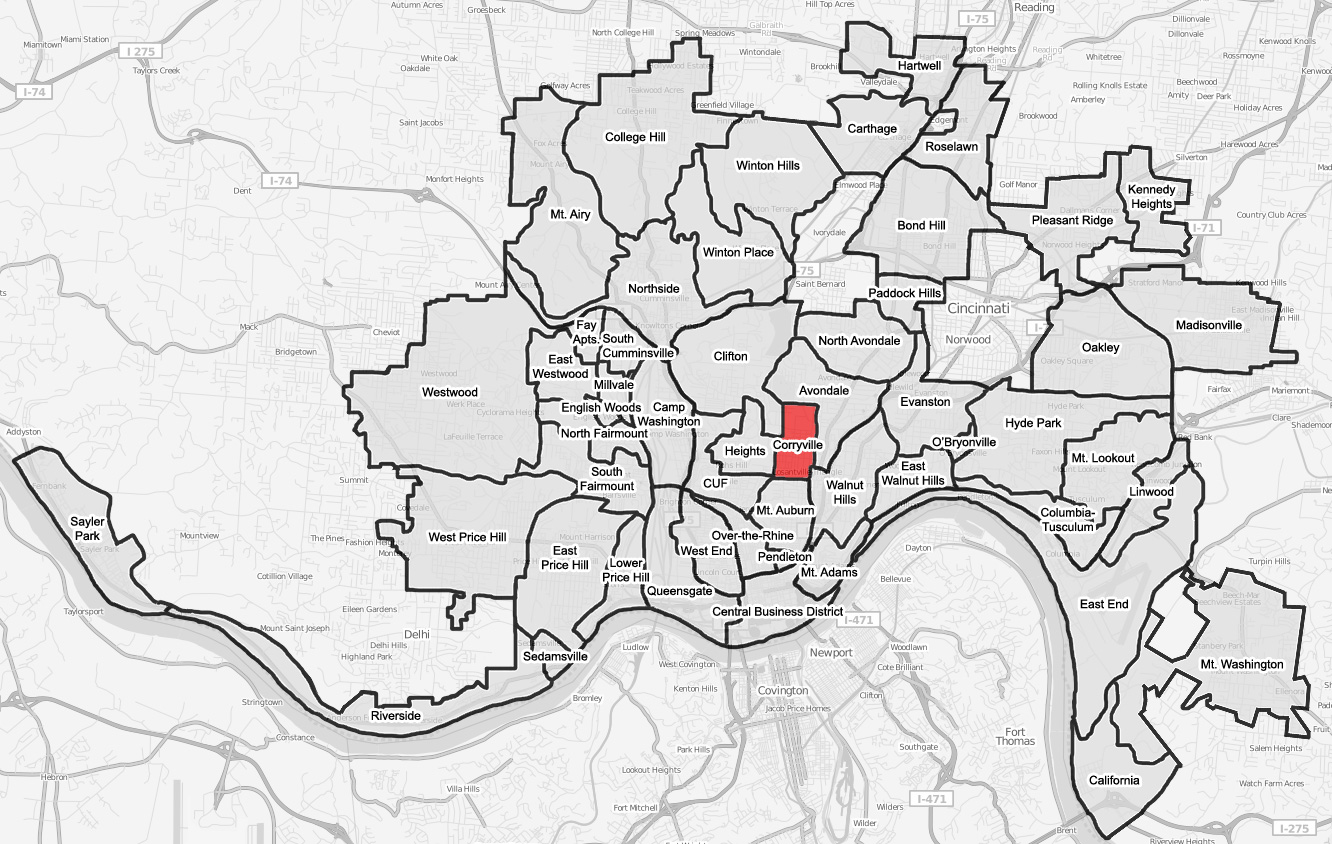
- Corryville (red) within Cincinnati, Ohio
- Country: United States
- State: Ohio
- City: Cincinnati

Population (2020)
  - Total: 4,373
- Time zone: UTC-5 (EST)
  - Summer (DST): UTC-4 (EDT)
- ZIP code: 45219

Corryville is one of the 52 neighborhoods of Cincinnati, Ohio. It is located immediately east of the University of Cincinnati, southeast of Clifton, south and west of Avondale, northwest of Walnut Hills, and north of Mount Auburn. The population was 4,373 at the 2020 census.

== History ==
The original owners of part of the land were Jacob Burnet and William McMillan. The neighborhood's namesake, William Corry, was an early mayor of Cincinnati and himself a prominent landowner in the Corryville area. German Americans largely settled the village of Corryville, moving north up the hillside from the congested Over-the-Rhine basin. Corryville was annexed to the City of Cincinnati in 1870.

Expansion of the University of Cincinnati in the 1960s resulted in the construction of a shopping center, known as University Plaza, along sections of Vine Street. This development, which included rerouting Vine Street, reinforced the unofficial name of the section of Vine Street in Corryville, which had been referred to as "Short Vine" since the 1920s.

Further expansion of the university in the 2000s resulted in further development. The neighborhood increasing became inhabited by university students. Consequently, property values in the area increased year-over-year since 2005, causing renewed interest in economic investment in the area while furthering the demographic shift of the area. According to Realtor.com, the average home price in Corryville is $232,812 compared with $174,900 for Cincinnati. Additionally, the average cost per square foot is $176 compared with $71 for Cincinnati.

== Demographics ==
Population of Corryville 1900-2020
Year	Pop.	±%
1900	4,371	—
1910	5,408	+23.7%
1920	6,500	+20.2%
1930	7,135	+9.8%
1940	7,297	+2.3%
1950	7,429	+1.8%
1960	7,482	+0.7%
1970	6,089	−18.6%
1980	4,539	−25.5%
1990	4,439	−2.2%
2000	3,830	−13.7%
2010	3,327	−13.1%
2020	4,373	+31.4%

As of the census of 2020, there were 4,373 people living in the neighborhood. There were 2,362 housing units. The racial makeup of the neighborhood was 67.7% White, 14.9% Black or African American, 0.1% Native American, 11.7% Asian, 0.0% Pacific Islander, 0.5% from some other race, and 5.1% from two or more races. 2.4% of the population were Hispanic or Latino of any race.

There were 1,868 households, out of which 12.0% were families. 36.6% of all households were made up of individuals.

4.4% of the neighborhood's population were under the age of 18, 94.4% were 18 to 64, and 1.2% were 65 years of age or older. 52.5% of the population were male and 47.5% were female.

According to the U.S. Census American Community Survey, for the period 2016-2020 the estimated median annual income for a household in the neighborhood was $24,929. About 20.4% of family households were living below the poverty line. About 48.0% had a bachelor's degree or higher.

== Culture ==
Corryville's central business district is located along a section of Vine Street known as Short Vine, which contains several shops, restaurants, bars, and the music venue Bogart's. Mecklenburg's Garden, a German restaurant founded in the 1800s, is listed on the National Register of Historic Places; it has operated since at least 1870. Short Vine was also home to Sudsy Malone's Rock 'n Roll Laundry & Bar and other small music venues catering to the punk and alternative rock crowd during the 1980s and 1990s.

== See also ==
- Pill Hill, Cincinnati
