= Sudsy Malone's Rock 'n Roll Laundry & Bar =

Defunct music venue in Cincinnati, Ohio

Sudsy Malone's
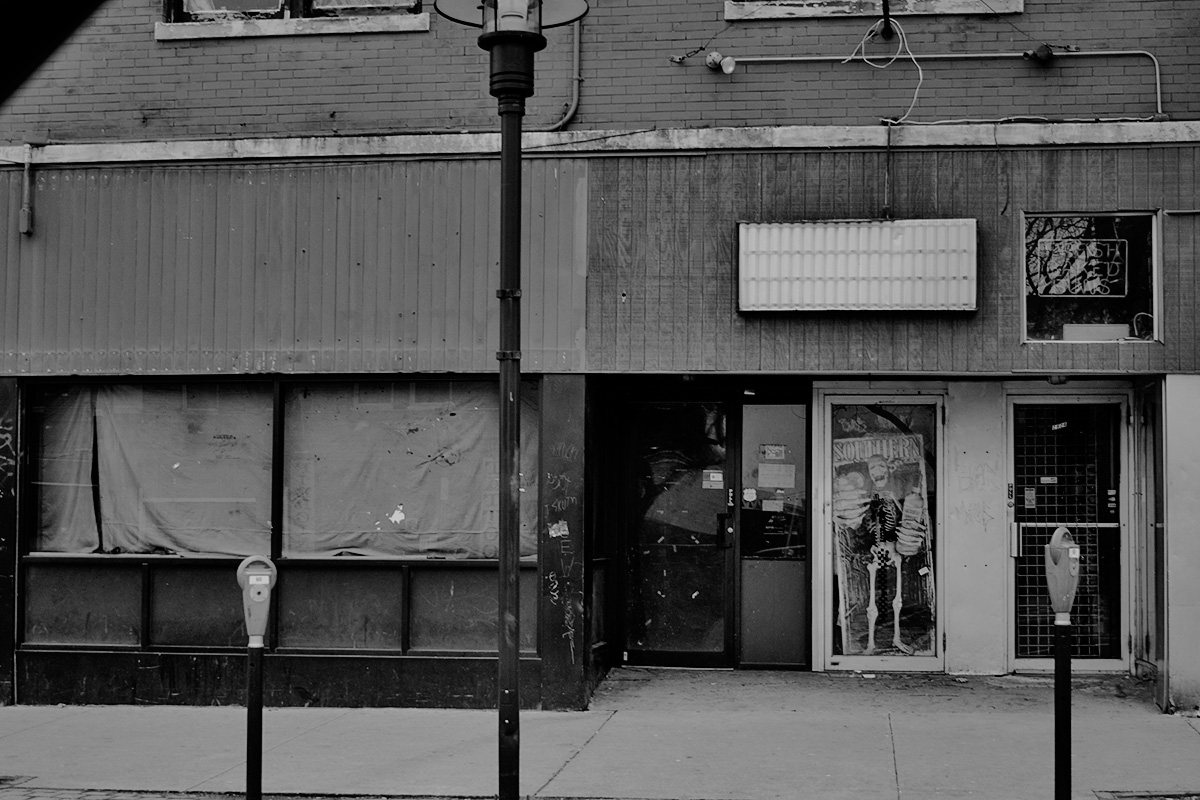
- Interactive map of Sudsy Malone's
- Address: 2626 Vine Street; Cincinnati, OH; United States
- Coordinates: 39°07′48″N 84°30′33″W
- Owner: John Cioffi
- Capacity: 400
- Current use: Demolished

Construction
- Opened: 1986
- Closed: 2008

Sudsy Malone's Rock 'n Roll Laundry & Bar was a music venue and dive bar in the Corryville neighborhood of Cincinnati, Ohio, across the street from Bogart's near the University of Cincinnati. The site often showcased many indie music and punk music bands, with several going on to become major acts after playing there. As the name suggests, the bar also housed a laundromat in back, and a load of laundry stood in for the cover charge on music nights. Sudsy's experienced some financial difficulties during its existence, closing and reopening several times before shutting down for good in 2008.

== History ==
Sudsy's was founded in 1986 by John Cioffi and partner Michael Sharp, influenced by similar businesses opening up in the region. According to former managing partner, Janine Walz, a notable example was Dungarees in Columbus, OH which had a small refreshment bar that served beer while patrons waited for their laundry to finish. Cioffi envisioned a full-service bar to complement the laundry area, but not the sound stage for live music.

A few months after opening, a local band called The Thangs, who were struggling to find a venue that would have them, approached Sudsy's and were accepted. The first show unexpectedly attracted a crowd of 100, and the bar ran out of beer as normal patronage to that point rarely exceeded 10. Cioffi invited them back the next night, and eventually every weekend, with the band recruiting their friends to play openers for them.

Shortly thereafter, live music became a fixture, with only a small cover charge to pay the band for their performances. That amount was raised to $5 by 1987, which was waived for patrons toting a full load of laundry. Crowds continued to grow, becoming so large that it exceeded its stated capacity, prompting intervention from the fire department. Performances were halted for a short time to bring the building up to code.

By the early 2000s the business was experiencing financial difficulties due a declining laundry business, its regular patrons visiting less frequently, and rising crime in the area reducing overall traffic. Disagreements between Walz—now the majority owner—and booking manager Dan McCabe over which acts to hire, plus the fact that Walz was pregnant and wanted to focus on starting a family, prompted her to sell the business in 2002. Sudsy's continued to decline, and was closed in 2008. The building remained vacant until fall of 2020 when it and one of its neighbors was demolished to make way for new multi-family housing and a mixed-use development building as part of ongoing redevelopment projects along the same block of Short Vine St.

== Venue ==
The location featured a 40-foot bar, with the laundry room situated in the back of the building. After bands complained that the bright fluorescent lighting was ruining the experience of the crowd, staff began using Christmas lights in the laundry room for night performances. In a retrospective for Cincinnati magazine, columnist Cedric Rose wrote that during performances, "it was so loud that the air felt pressurized" and smelled of "smoke, detergent, beer, whiskey, dryer lint, sweat, and brand-new songs that are still being sung 30 years later." Rose also said the laundry facility—with its cover charge waiver—gave poor University of Cincinnati students a means and pretext to be there. "The laundromat area was the perfect place for commitment-averse Generation-Xers to be cool while not trying to be cool," he wrote.

Sudsy's hosted live music nearly every night of the week, featuring various late 1980s and 1990s genres that included punk, grunge, and alternative rock. Hundreds of local and regional artists performed there, some of whom went on to even greater success. Local bands Afghan Whigs, Ass Ponys, and Over the Rhine gained followings at the venue prior to wider recognition outside Cincinnati. Ass Ponys bassist, Randy Cheek said that Sudsy's at the time they played there was more about the music than commercialism. "After all, you were still just playing in a goddamn laundromat," he said.

After its beginnings as a popular underground music venue, Sudsy's began attracting the attention of national music labels, with scouts showing up at shows with video cameras. Major acts that played at Sudsy's in their early days include Beck, Better Than Ezra, Betty Blowtorch, Cat Power, The Gathering, Girls Against Boys, G. Love & Special Sauce, Guided by Voices, Jack White/The White Stripes, Jeff Buckley, The Jesus Lizard, Jon Spencer Blues Explosion, Modest Mouse, Morphine, Neutral Milk Hotel, Red Hot Chili Peppers, Sleater-Kinney, Smashing Pumpkins, Spoon, Stereolab, Superchunk, Vains of Jenna, Wesley Willis, and Yo La Tengo.

At the peak of its success as a music venue, Sudsy's became a place where musicians themselves became patrons, socializing with the crowd during other bands' performances. Waltz recalled instances of members of acts too large to play Sudsy's stopping by, including Jackson Browne, James Taylor and "Weird Al" Yankovic. Another time, she gave four members of Jefferson Airplane a ride to their hotel, not recognizing them until realizing they were late for a show that night at the outdoor amphitheater Riverbend Music Center. Dan Reed, who went on to become music director at WXPN in Philadelphia said that when he tended bar at Sudsy's, performers from famous acts across the street at Bogart's would frequently come in for a $3 beer. "I served Izzy Stradlin and the drummer from Guns N' Roses," he said.

The bar was also popular with critics, with Creem magazine naming it the best bar in Ohio of 1993.
