= Peebles' Corner Historic District =

Historic district in Ohio, United States

- U.S. National Register of Historic Places
- U.S. Historic district
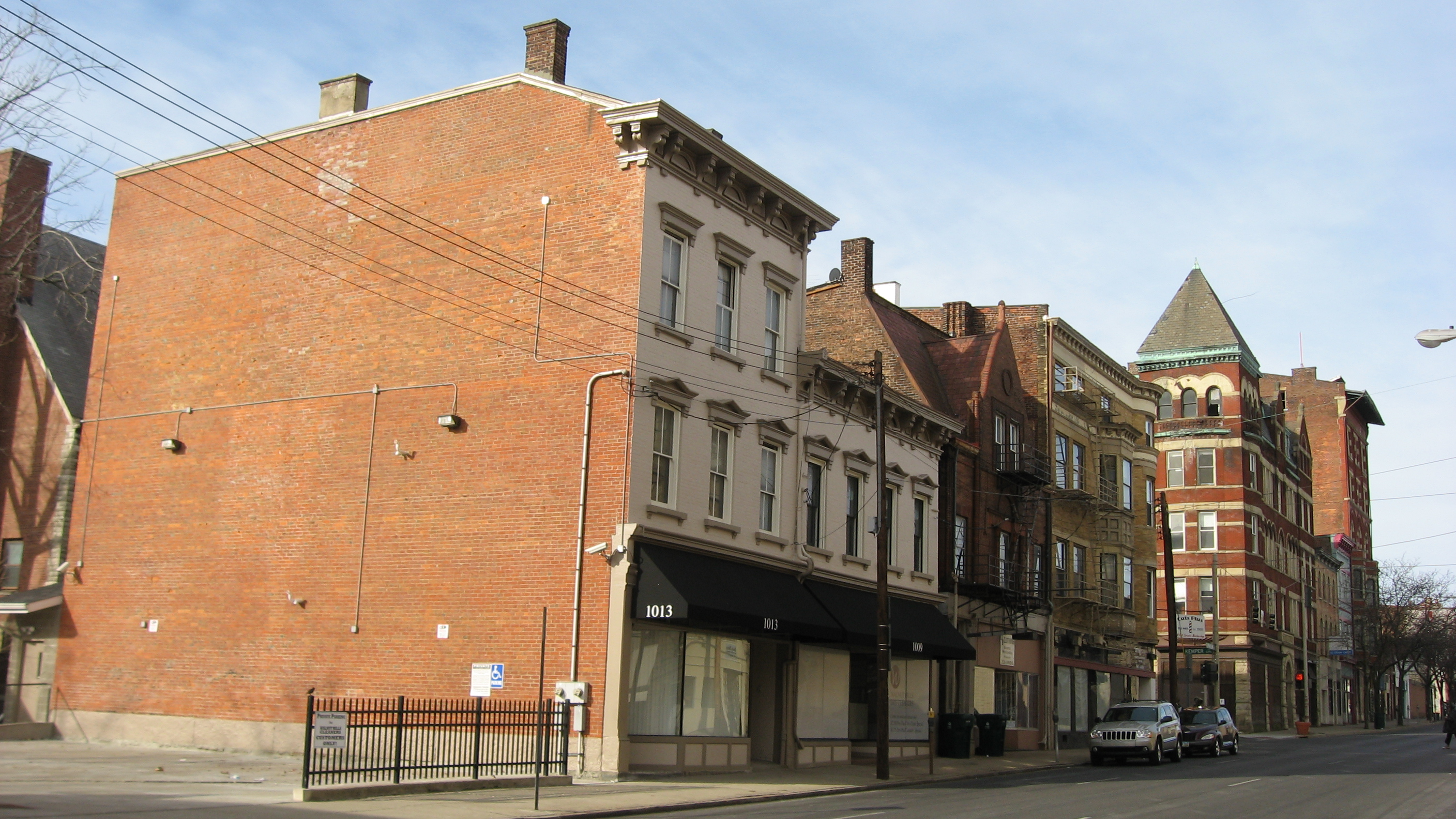
- Buildings in the district

- Location within Ohio Location within the United States
- Location: Roughly E. McMillan St. and Gilbert Ave., Cincinnati, Ohio
- Coordinates: 39°7′34″N 84°29′25″W
- Area: 124 acres (0.50 km^{2})
- Architectural style: Late Victorian, Classical Revival and Art Deco
- NRHP reference No.: 85002835
- Added to NRHP: November 14, 1985

Peebles' Corner Historic District is a registered historic district surrounding the intersection of East McMillan Street and Gilbert Avenue in the neighborhood of Walnut Hills in Cincinnati, Ohio, United States. It was listed in the National Register of Historic Places on November 14, 1985.

Beginning in 1883, the northeast corner was the site of the first branch of the Joseph R. Peebles' Sons Co. grocery store. The name Peebles' Corner caught on with the public when the store owners persuaded conductors to announce their store as a stop on Cincinnati streetcars. The intersection served (and still serves) as a key cross-town transit transfer point in the city. The intersection had previously been called Kay's Corner, after the W. L. Kay & Co. grocers on the southeast corner. Peebles' grocery store closed in 1931 at the height of the Great Depression.

The Orpheum and Paramount theatres once stood at Peebles' Corner. Established in 1909, the Orpheum was the first playhouse built outside of the city center. The Opheum provided vaudeville entertainment then showed silent films. It was closed in 1952 and then later demolished. In the 1950s, businesses at Peebles' Corner declined further as white flight blighted this urban core. In the 1960s, blight was exacerbated by the riots of 1967. The Peebles' Corner Historic District was listed in the National Register of Historic Places on November 14, 1985. By 2009, several proposals had been aired for restoring Peebles' Corner. One vision of the Walnut Hills Area Council is for the city to acquire 10 to 15 buildings, and selectively tear down half. Resources would be concentrated on the buildings scheduled to become anchors in the district.

Gallery
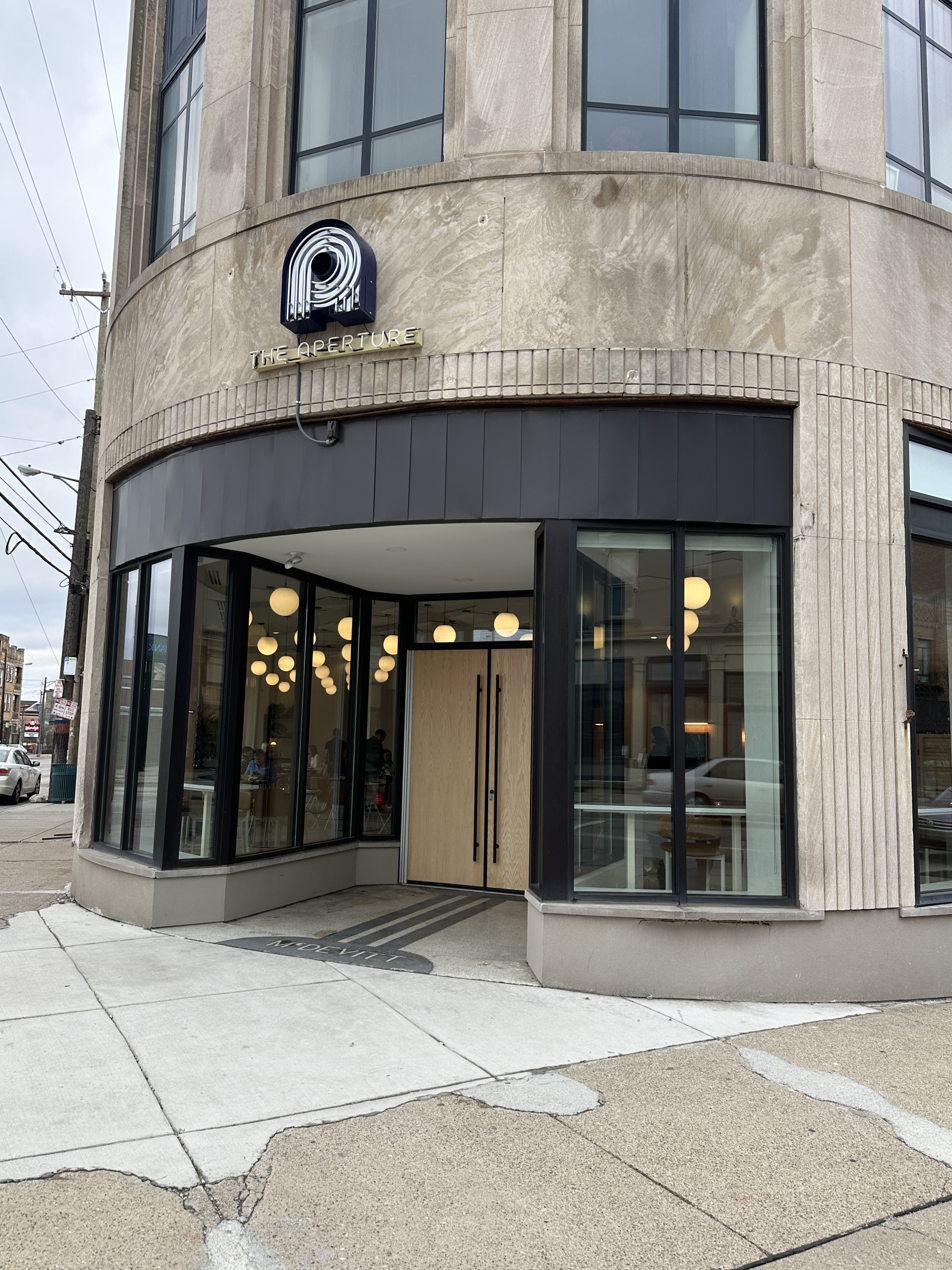
The Aperture on the Northeast corner

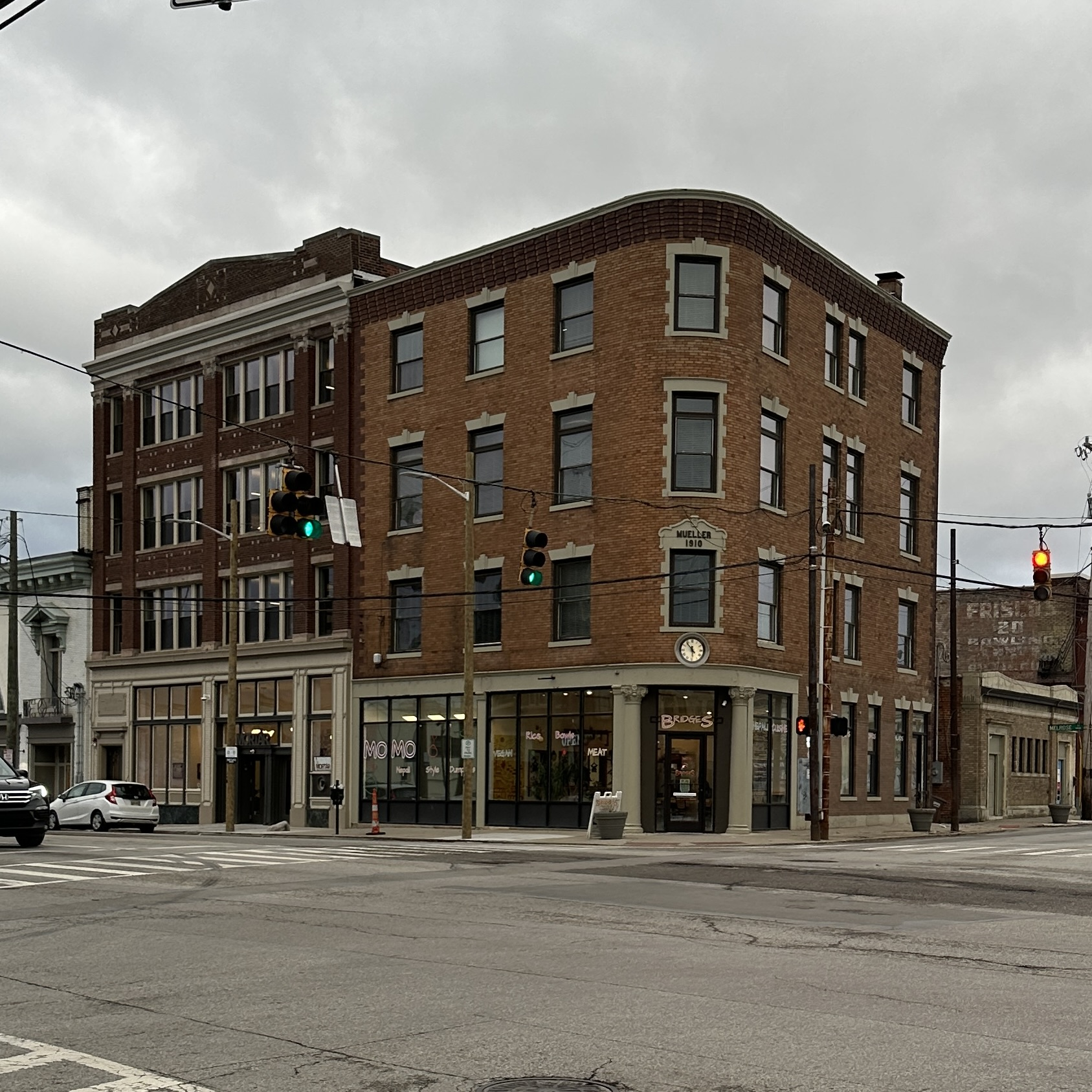
Southwest corner

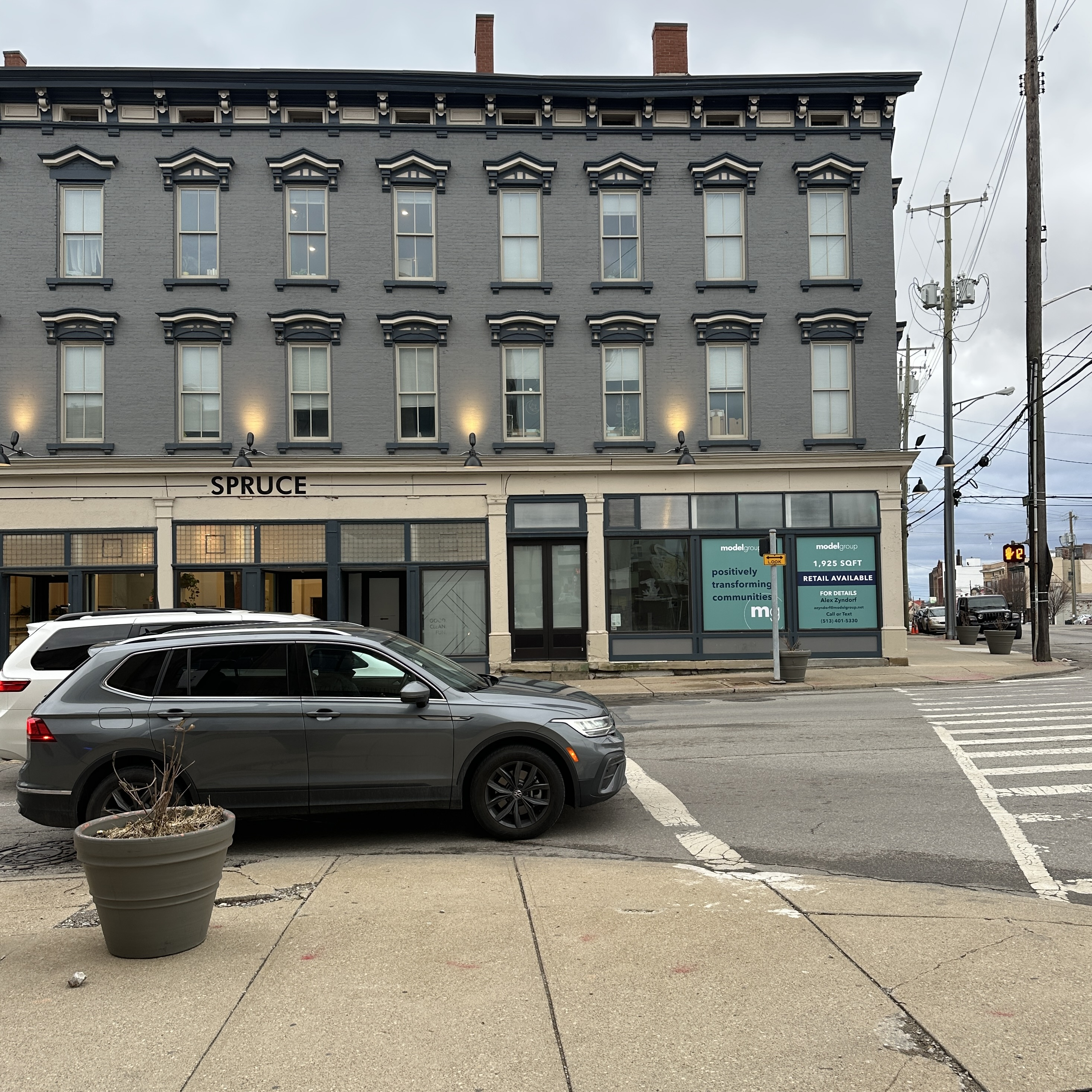
Southeast corner

== See also ==
- The Aperture, a restaurant in the district
- Harriet Beecher Stowe House, one-half mile north on Gilbert Ave.
