= Madam Fredin's Eden Park School and Neighboring Row House =

Historic buildings in Ohio, United States

- U.S. National Register of Historic Places
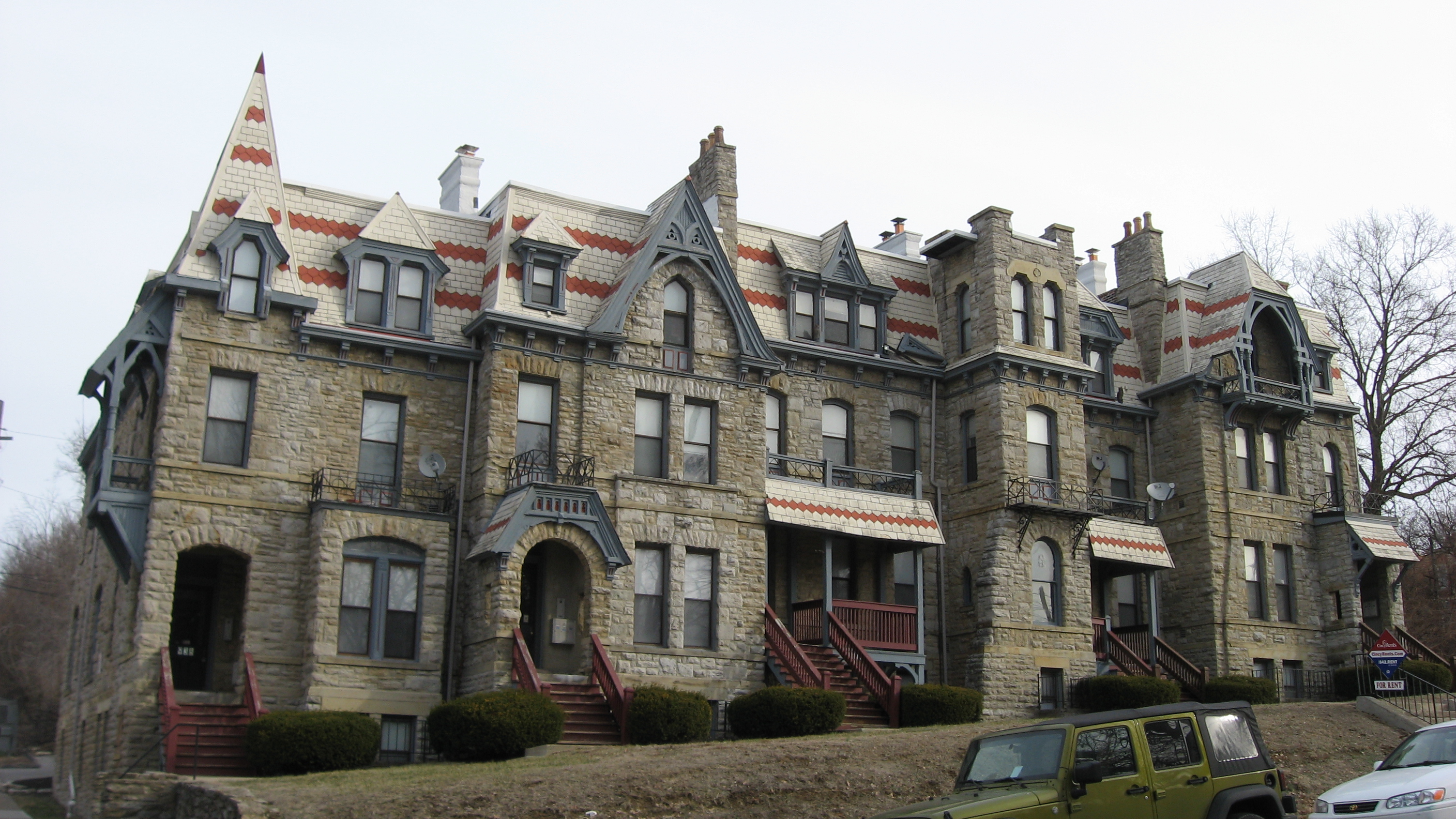
- Front of the former school
- Location: 938-946 Morris Street, Cincinnati, Ohio
- Coordinates: 39°07′07″N 84°29′39″W
- Architectural style: Gothic Revival and Gothic
- NRHP reference No.: 79001858
- Added to NRHP: November 29, 1979

Madam Fredin's Eden Park School and Neighboring Row House is a registered historic building in Cincinnati, Ohio, listed in the National Register on November 29, 1979.

The building is located at 938-946 Morris Street on the southern edge of the Walnut Hills neighborhood.

== Historic uses ==
- Single Dwelling
- School
