= Jirah Dewey Buck =

American homeopath and theosophist

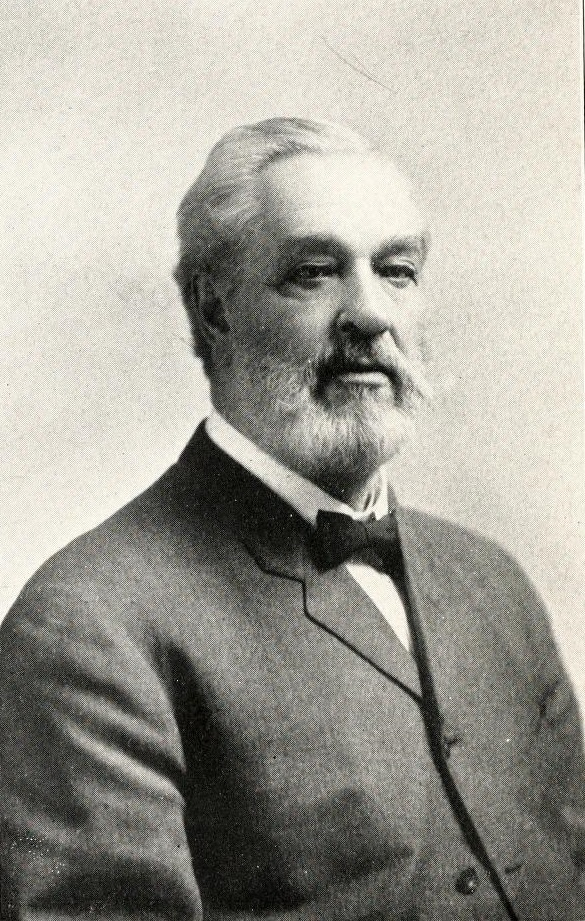
- Born: 20 November 1838; Fredonia, New York
- Died: 13 December 1916 (aged 78); Walnut Hills, Cincinnati
- Occupations: Homeopath, writer

Jirah Dewey Buck (20 November 1838 – 13 December 1916) was an American homeopath, naturopath, theosophist and writer.

== Biography ==
Buck was born in Fredonia, New York. He was educated at Belvidere Academy, Hahnemann Medical College in Chicago and the Western Homeopathic College in Cleveland, Ohio where he graduated in 1864. He was professor of physiology and microscopy at Cleveland Homeopathic College in 1866–1871. From 1880, he was professor of physiology at Pulte Medical College. In 1882, he was elected dean and professor of theory and practice of medicine. In 1876, he became President of the Homeopathic Medical Society of Ohio and was President of the American Institute of Homeopathy in 1890.

Buck was a freemason and theosophist. He was vice-President of the Theosophical Society of America and vice-president of the Cincinnati Literary Club. He married Melissa M. Clough in 1864. They had three daughters and three sons. He formed the Cincinnati Theosophical Society in 1886.

Buck died in his home in Walnut Hills, Cincinnati after a long illness.

Buck was an opponent of vivisection.

== Selected publications ==
- The Nature and Aim of Theosophy (1889)
- A Study of Man and the Way to Health (1904)
- Mystic Masonry (1911)
- New Avatar and the Destiny of the Soul (1911)
- Soul and Sex in Education (1912)
- Modern World Movements (1913)
