= Cincinnati (magazine) =

American monthly magazine

Cincinnati Magazine
- August 2018 cover of Cincinnati
- Editor: John Fox
- Categories: City magazine
- Frequency: Monthly
- Founded: 1967
- Company: Hour Media Group, LLC
- Country: United States
- Based in: Cincinnati, Ohio
- Language: English
- Website: www.cincinnatimagazine.com
- ISSN: 0746-8210
- OCLC: 10305190

Cincinnati magazine is a monthly lifestyle magazine concerning life in and about Cincinnati, Ohio. It was created by the Greater Cincinnati Chamber of Commerce in 1967. It was then purchased by CM Media in 1981. By 1997, the magazine had a circulation of some 30,000 and was acquired by Emmis Communications. During the early-mid-2000s, the magazine prospered, doubling both circulation and revenues and moving its facilities to Cincinnati's tallest building, Carew Tower. It was purchased by Detroit-based Hour Media in 2017. It is a member of the City and Regional Magazine Association (CRMA).

== Notable people ==
- Kathy Y. Wilson
