= Mecklenburg's Garden =

- Mecklenburg Gardens
- U.S. National Register of Historic Places
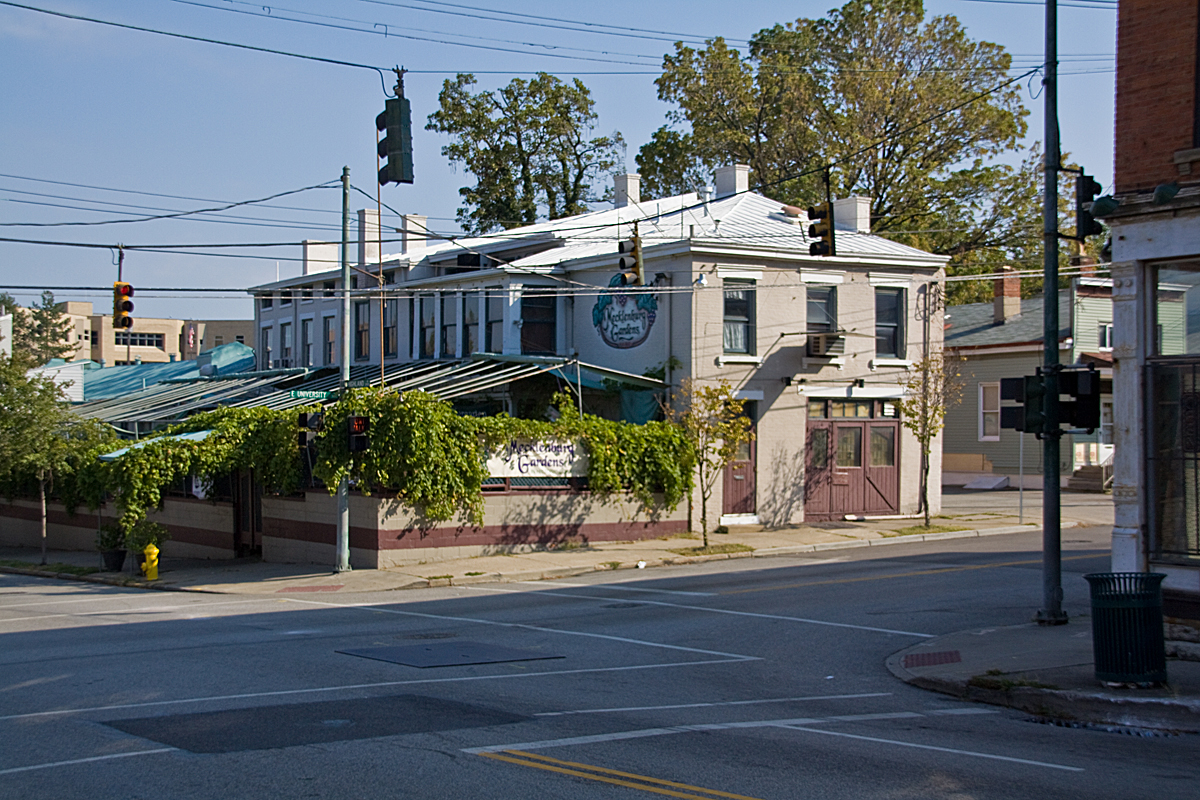
- Restaurant from the southwest

- Location within Ohio Location within the United States
- Location: 302 East University Avenue, Cincinnati, Ohio
- Coordinates: 39°7′57″N 84°30′10″W
- Area: less than one acre
- Built: 1865
- Architect: Louis Mecklenburg
- Architectural style: Italianate
- NRHP reference No.: 76001436
- Added to NRHP: November 7, 1976

Mecklenburg Gardens was a historic restaurant in the Corryville neighborhood of Cincinnati, Ohio, United States. Its Italianate building, perhaps constructed as a house, was built circa 1865, but it was converted into a restaurant by 1870. In its earliest years as a restaurant, it was run by John Neeb, who sold it to one of his employees in 1886. The new owner, Louis Mecklenburg, changed the name from "Mount Auburn Garden Restaurant" to "Mecklenburg Gardens," and converted it from a saloon to a heavily German beer garden. During this time, Cincinnati was receiving massive numbers of German immigrants; with as much as 25% of the city's population being German-born, cultural institutions such as beer gardens were extremely popular.

As the years passed, Mecklenburg Gardens prospered and expanded to accommodate more diners. Patrons historically made heavy use of the walled outdoor eating area, which was shaded by awnings and featured trellises covered by grapevines. During the 20th century, the Gardens underwent a series of changes. Under Prohibition, the leading element of its income was outlawed, but it continued to operate covertly as a speakeasy as well as a legal restaurant: patrons knew whether they could safely purchase alcohol based on the position of a ship model on a counter. During the 1970s, the building underwent a structural restoration, around the time that it was owned by an ashram that, according to legend, made a failed attempt to convert the restaurant's kitchen staff.

Although the restaurant closed multiple times during the late twentieth century, it reopened in 1996, and has continued in operation until the present time. In recognition of its place in local history, Mecklenburg Gardens was listed on the National Register of Historic Places in 1976. The building housing the restaurant is a rectangular structure, built of brick on a stone foundation. Besides the historic outdoor garden, the interior features several small dining rooms and a central pub area to accommodate patrons.

The German restaurant and beer garden closed permanently in 2023.
