= Cincinnati CityBeat =

Alternative weekly newspaper in Cincinnati, Ohio

- Type: Alternative weekly
- Format: Tabloid
- Owner: LINK Media
- Founded: 1994
- Circulation: 5,000 (as of December 2025)
- Website: citybeat.com

Cincinnati CityBeat is an independent local arts and issues publication covering the Cincinnati, Ohio area.

== History ==
CityBeat was founded in November 1994. It was backed by local entrepreneur Thomas Schiff and co-founded by John Fox, who left his editor position at Everybody's News (at that point Cincinnati's only print source for independent news) to start the paper. CityBeat has won numerous national, statewide and local journalism and design awards, most recently being named Best Weekly Paper in the state of Ohio in 2005 by the Society of Professional Journalists.

In 2012, CityBeat was acquired by SouthComm Communications. In 2018, it was sold to Euclid Media Group. The company dissolved in August 2023 the newspaper was sold to Chris Keating, operating under the name Big Lou Holdings LLC.

On December 10, 2025, it was announced that LINK Media acquired CityBeat magazine from Big Lou Holdings.

== Affiliations ==
CityBeat is a member of the Association of Alternative Newsweeklies.

== Notable people ==
- Kathy Y. Wilson, journalist, columnist, playwright, and commentator
