= Walnut Hills, Cincinnati =

Coordinates: 39°07′37″N 84°29′03″W

Walnut Hills
- Neighborhood of Cincinnati
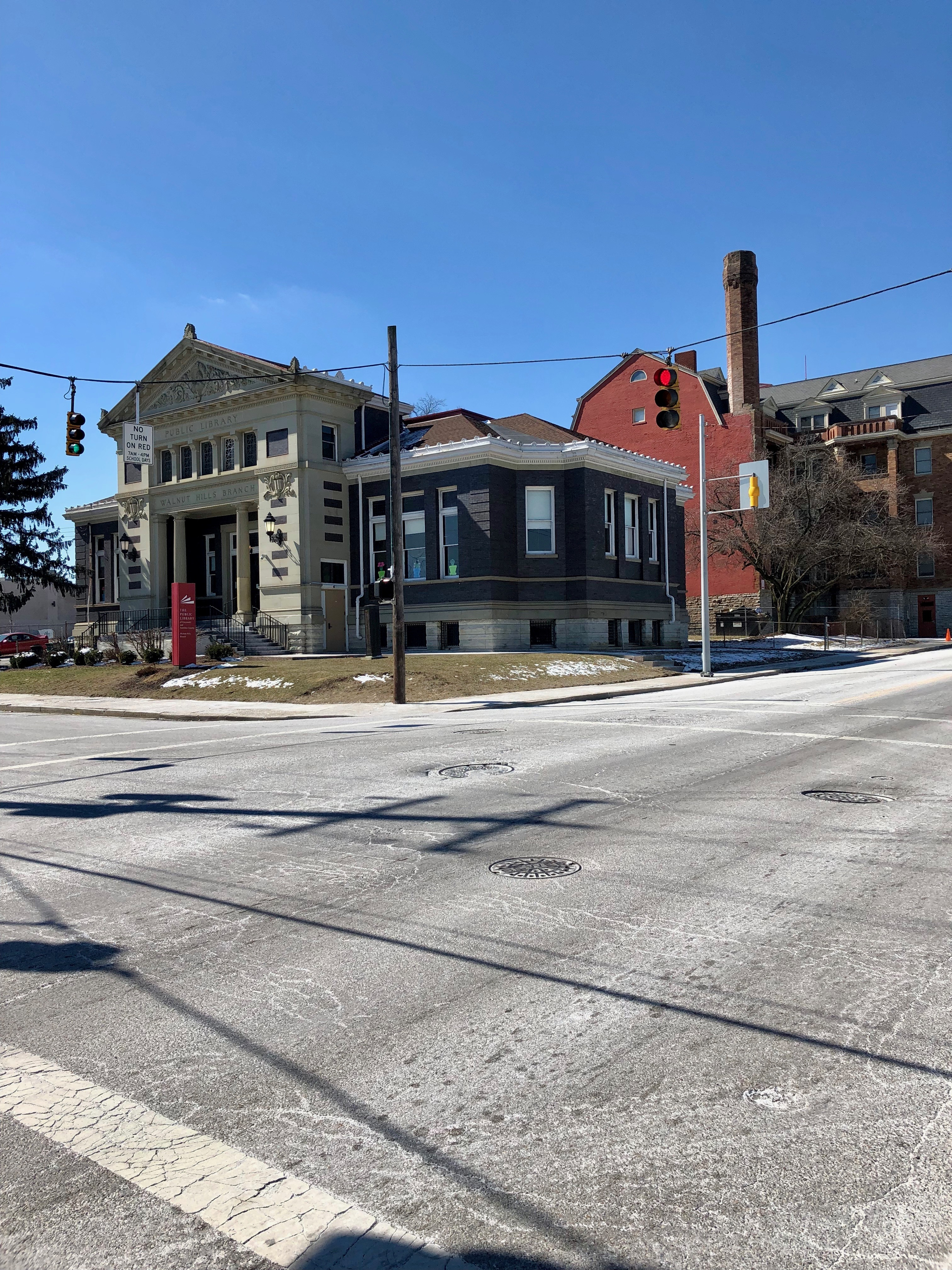
- Walnut Hills Branch Library

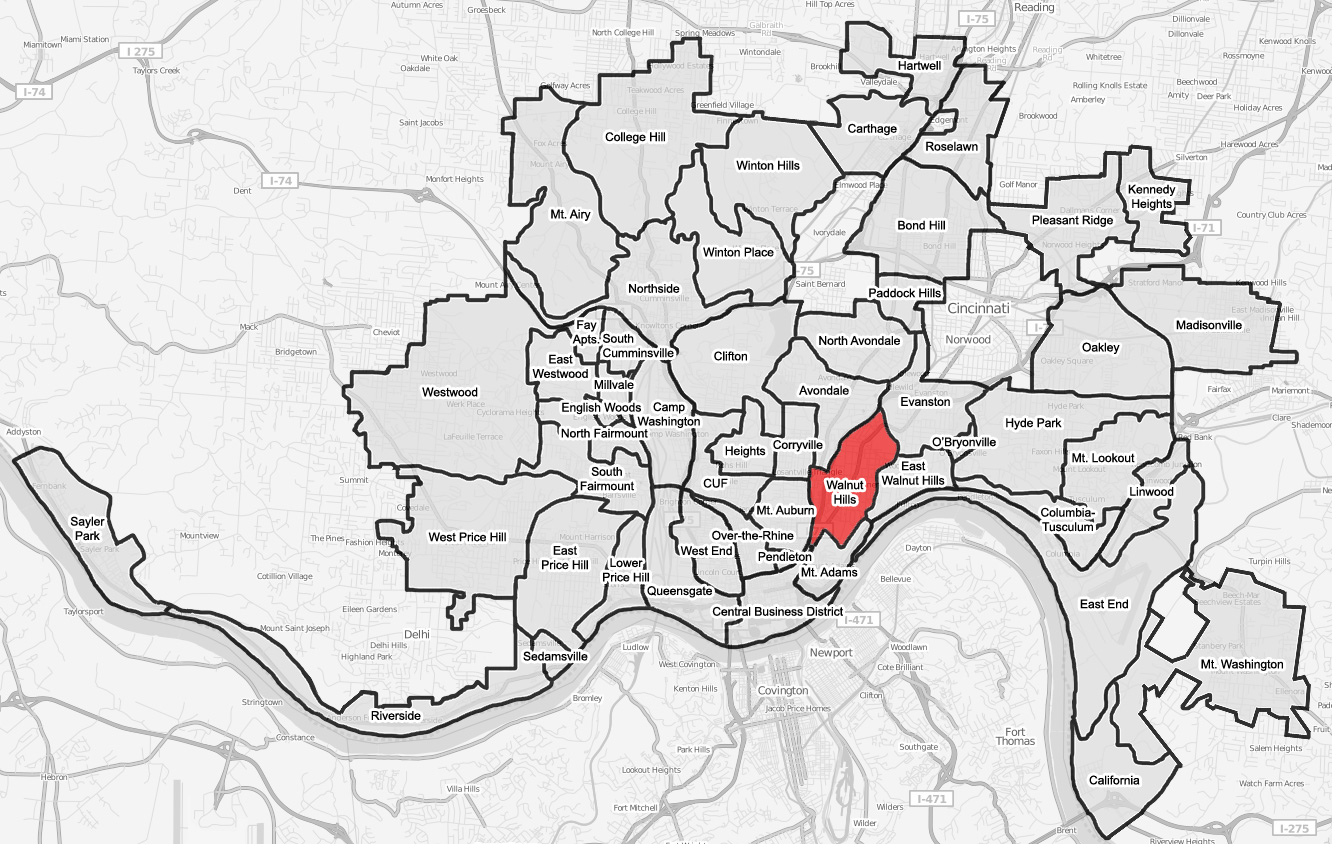
- Walnut Hills (red) within Cincinnati, Ohio.
- Country: United States
- State: Ohio
- City: Cincinnati

Population (2020)
  - Total: 6,344

Walnut Hills is one of the 52 neighborhoods of Cincinnati, Ohio. One of the city's oldest hilltop neighborhoods, it is a large diverse area on the near east side of Cincinnati. The population was 6,344 in the 2020 census.

== History ==
The neighborhood was named from the farm of an early settler, Reverend James Kemper, which he called Walnut Hill. For generations, the Kemper family lived in the Kemper Log House. Walnut Hills was annexed to the City of Cincinnati in September, 1869.

After the turn of the century, new migrants from Cincinnati's downtown basin moved to the area. Like South Avondale, Walnut Hills was home to many Jewish and Italian families. An area on the western side of McMillan St. was known as “Little Italy.” After construction of the Union Terminal, and other public housing projects demolished housing in the West End, many African Americans moved to the area in the 1930s. When modern suburbs were created after World War II, many of community's middle class white residents moved out of Walnut Hills. Similarly, middle class African Americans moved from the area after less affluent residents moved to the area. Almost 80% of Walnut Hills was populated by African Americans by 1970.

=== Historic sites ===
Walnut Hills is home to multiple historic sites. The Harriet Beecher Stowe House was where Harriet Beecher Stowe's father, Lyman Beecher, lived. Harriet spent time there since it was the center of Beecher family life in Cincinnati. While Harriet's husband was out of town her first children, twin daughters, were born in the house. Although Harriet wrote her famous anti-slavery novel in Brunswick Maine, the factual material for the novel was gathered during her almost 20 years in Cincinnati. Her father was the president of Lane Seminary where Harriet first learned about the horrors of slavery by attending the famous Lane Debates. These were a series of presentations, held at the seminary in 1834, about the need to abolish slavery.'

The Walnut Hills Library, Cincinnati's first Carnegie Library, and the Walnut Hills United Presbyterian Church's remaining tower at Taft and Gilbert were designed by architect Samuel Hannaford.

The commercial district at Peebles' Corner, originally called Kemper's Corner, was once the busiest district outside Downtown Cincinnati, with six street cars lines intersecting at McMillan and Gilbert by the end of the 19th century.

The original site of Walnut Hills High School is located in the neighborhood.

Several historic districts in Walnut Hills have been listed on the National Register. These include the Gilbert-Sinton Historic District, Gilbert Row, and Peeble's Corner Historic District.

== Demographics ==
Population of Walnut Hills 1900-2020
Year	Pop.	±%
1900	16,136	—
1910	18,018	+11.7%
1920	21,125	+17.2%
1930	21,545	+2.0%
1940	22,824	+5.9%
1950	23,369	+2.4%
1960	20,658	−11.6%
1970	14,049	−32.0%
1980	9,907	−29.5%
1990	8,917	−10.0%
2000	7,790	−12.6%
2010	6,495	−16.6%
2020	6,344	−2.3%

As of the census of 2020, there were 6,344 people living in the neighborhood. There were 4,223 housing units. The racial makeup of the neighborhood was 32.8% White, 60.1% Black or African American, 0.2% Native American, 1.4% Asian, 0.1% Pacific Islander, 0.8% from some other race, and 4.7% from two or more races. 2.4% of the population were Hispanic or Latino of any race.

There were 3,777 households, out of which 32.6% were families. About 65.7% of all households were made up of individuals.

12.7% of the neighborhood's population were under the age of 18, 71.8% were 18 to 64, and 15.5% were 65 years of age or older. 48.5% of the population were male and 51.5% were female.

According to the U.S. Census American Community Survey, for the period 2016-2020 the estimated median annual income for a household in the neighborhood was $30,259. About 30.5% of family households were living below the poverty line. About 27.8% of adults had a bachelor's degree or higher.

== Notable people ==
- Emily Blackwell, physician and women's rights activist
- Jirah Dewey Buck, homeopath, naturopath, theosophist and writer
- George Hurrell, photographer
- Jennie Jackson, singer and voice teacher
- Dov Behr Manischewitz, rabbi and businessman
- Albert C. Nash, architect
- Dixie Selden, artist
- Calvin Ellis Stowe, Biblical scholar
- Harriet Beecher Stowe, author and abolitionist
- Kathy Y. Wilson, journalist, columnist, playwright, and commentator
- Russell Wilson, politician and newspaper editor

== See also ==
- East Walnut Hills
