= Landt Building =

- U.S. National Register of Historic Places
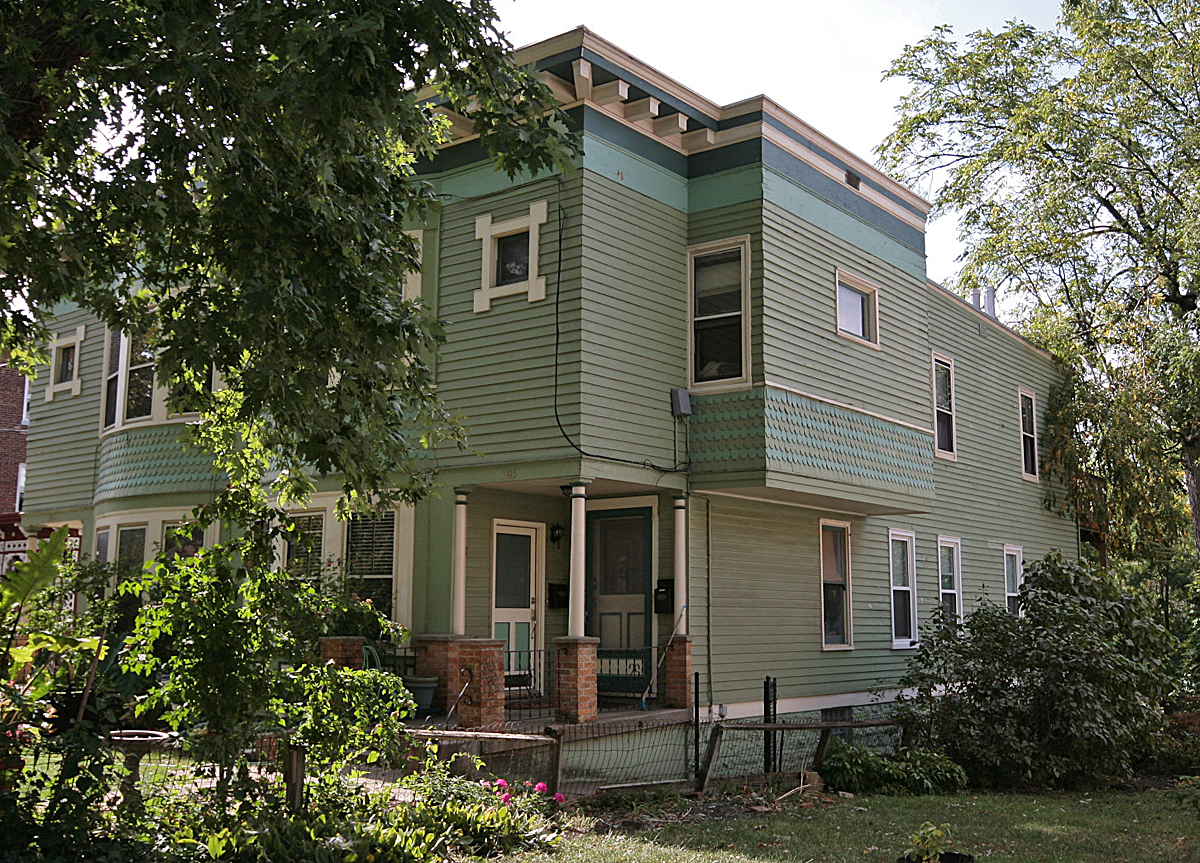
- Front and eastern side

- Location within Ohio Location within the United States
- Location: 3815-3817 Eastern Ave., Cincinnati, Ohio
- Coordinates: 39°6′41″N 84°26′8″W
- Area: 0 acres (0 ha)
- Built: 1895
- Architectural style: Transitional
- MPS: Columbia-Tusculum MRA
- NRHP reference No.: 79002703
- Added to NRHP: August 24, 1979

The Landt Building is a historic house in the Columbia-Tusculum neighborhood of Cincinnati, Ohio, United States. Constructed at the end of the nineteenth century, it has been named one of the neighborhood's numerous historic sites.

Erected in 1895, the Landt Building is a residence featuring evidence of the transition in popular architectural styles occurring at the end of the century. Its basic elements are ordinary: the walls are frame and topped with a flat roof, and the floor plan is a simple rectangle. Each of the house's sides is divided into four bays. Both the front and the sides feature overhangs, but the facade is markedly different from the other sides in its level of ornamentation. Placed on the side is a simple box-shaped structure on the second story only, while two curved section, resembling shallow bay windows, project from the middle of the facade and rise from the ground to the roof. Each is pierced by three windows on each story, and the walls of the projections are partly covered with roofing shingles. Two main entrances are placed in the facade, one on each corner. The cornice is distinguished by a bed-mould of prominent dentils, architectural styling from a different period; the house is unusual for its mix of details from the Georgian style with components from the far later styles current in the 1890s. Although originally built as a single-family residence, the Landt Building has since been converted into apartments.

In 1979, the Landt Building was listed on the National Register of Historic Places, qualifying because of its well-preserved unusual historic architecture. It was part of a group of seventeen Columbia-Tusculum properties added to the Register together as a multiple property submission; among the other members of the group were the Spencer Township Hall, the Kellogg House, and the Bates Building, all of which are located in the same block of Eastern Avenue as the Landt Building.
