= L.B. Robb Drugstore =

- U.S. National Register of Historic Places
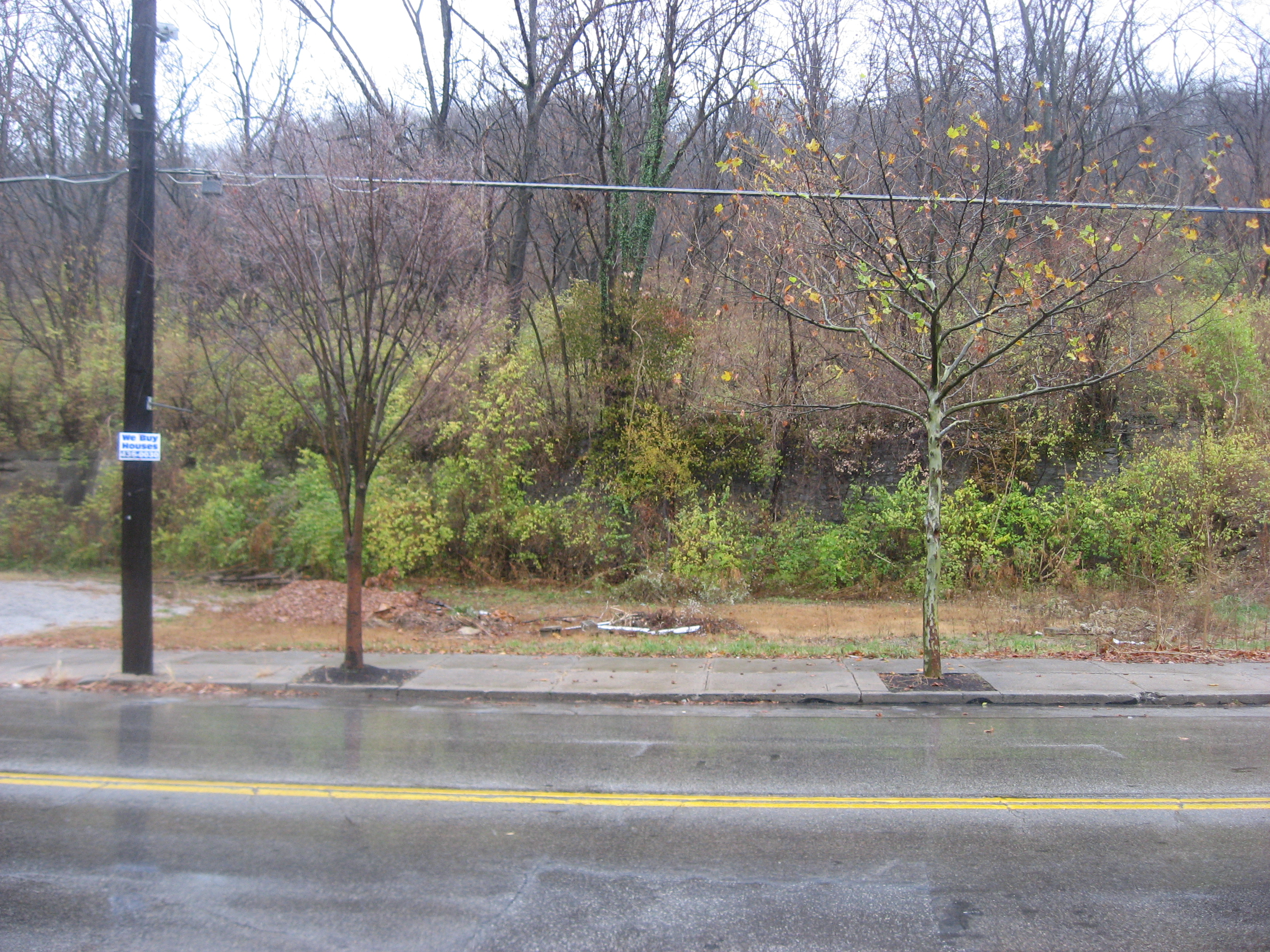
- Site of the drugstore

- Location within Ohio Location within the United States
- Location: 4030 Eastern Ave., Cincinnati, Ohio
- Coordinates: 39°6′30″N 84°25′55″W
- Area: Less than 1 acre (0.40 ha)
- Built: 1860
- MPS: Columbia-Tusculum MRA
- NRHP reference No.: 79002694
- Added to NRHP: August 24, 1979

The L.B. Robb Drugstore was a historic pharmacy in the Columbia-Tusculum neighborhood of Cincinnati, Ohio, United States. Erected in 1860, it was a four-story building, constructed of brick on a stone foundation and topped with a slate roof. The building was a simple rectangle in its floor plan, although not without embellishments: the roof, which rose to gables on the sides, was crowned by a large central chimney, while the gables were ornamented with machicolations, and the walls were anchored by brick pilasters. After the drugstore was completed, it was modified by the addition of a wooden porch to one of the sides; aside from the porch, it measured four bays on the front, four on the rear, and four on each side. The windows were of plain lintel construction with lugsills on the sides.

From its earliest years, the building was used as a drugstore; it is certain that it was used for such a purpose for some time before 1868. In 1928, it was purchased by Arthur Clauder, who also owned Clauder's Pharmacy next door. Today, no drugstore occupies the site: the building has been destroyed, and the site is now an empty lot. While still in good condition, the L.B. Robb Drugstore was listed on the National Register of Historic Places in 1979. It was one of seventeen Columbia-Tusculum properties included in a multiple property submission related to a historic preservation survey conducted in the previous year; most of the properties were buildings, but the Columbia Baptist and Fulton-Presbyterian Cemeteries were also included.
