= Norwell Residence =

Historic house in Ohio, United States

- U.S. National Register of Historic Places
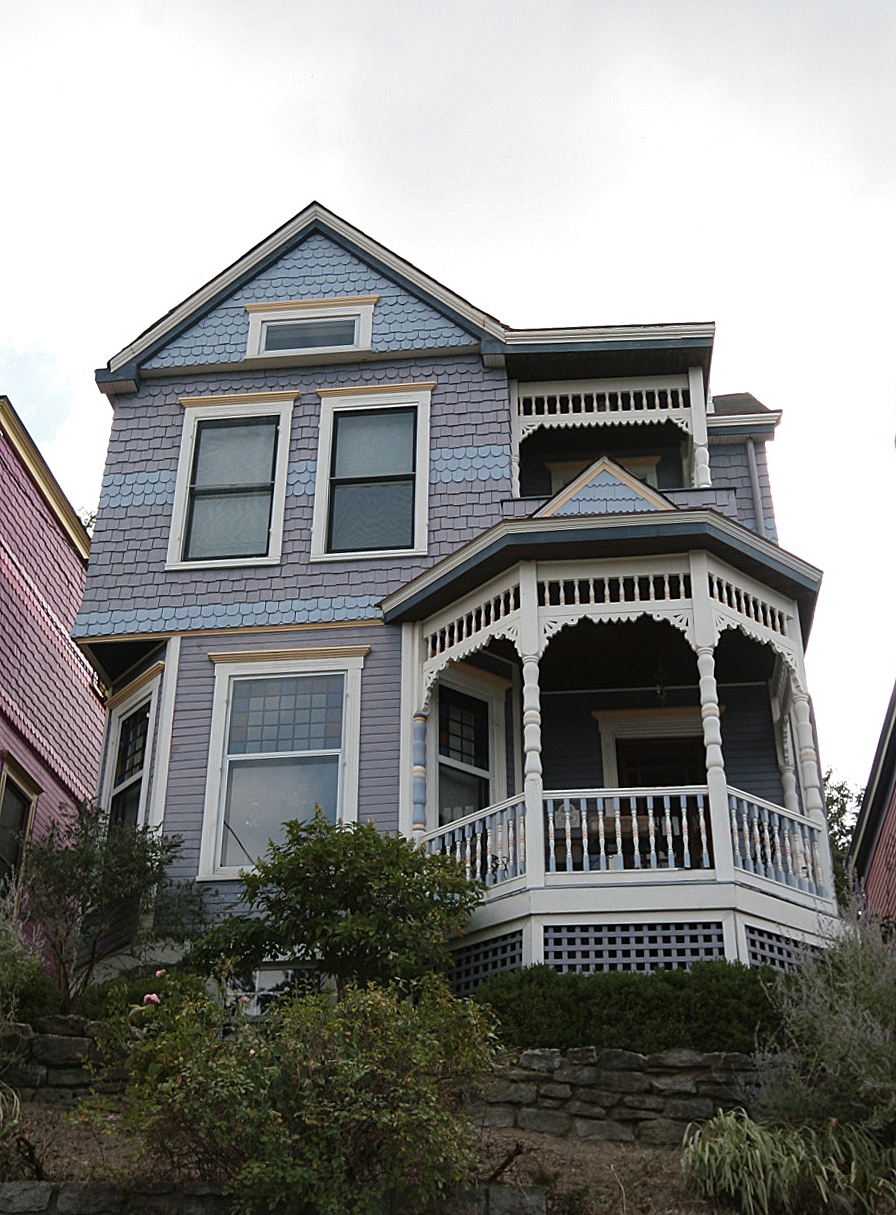
- Front of the house

- Location within Ohio Location within the United States
- Location: 506 Tusculum Ave., Cincinnati, Ohio
- Coordinates: 39°6′53″N 84°26′0″W
- Area: Less than 1 acre (0.40 ha)
- Built: 1890
- Architectural style: Late Victorian
- MPS: Columbia-Tusculum MRA
- NRHP reference No.: 79002707
- Added to NRHP: August 24, 1979

The Norwell Residence is a historic house in the Columbia-Tusculum neighborhood of Cincinnati, Ohio, United States. A Victorian building constructed in 1890, it is a weatherboarded structure with a stone foundation and a shingled roof. The overall floor plan of the house is irregular: two and half stories tall, the house is shaped like the letter "L" but appears to be a rectangle, due to the presence of two separate porches that fill in the remaining area. Many ornate details characterize it, including imbricated shingles on the westward-facing gable end of the house, a frieze with spindles on the railing of the primary porch, and small yet cunningly crafted braces for the same porch. Yet more distinctive is the secondary porch, which sits atop the primary one; it features braces and spindles similar to those of the primary porch.

Due to its virtually unchanged architecture, the Norwell Residence was called "outstanding" in a 1978 historic preservation survey that studied the architecture of Columbia-Tusculum. Contributing to its importance is its relationship with surrounding houses: eight other residences in the immediate vicinity were patterned after the Norwell Residence. Because of its architectural significance, it was listed on the National Register of Historic Places in 1979. It was one of seventeen Columbia-Tusculum properties included in a multiple property submission related to the previous year's historic preservation survey; most of the properties were buildings, but the Columbia Baptist and Fulton-Presbyterian Cemeteries were also included.
