= LuNeack House =

Historic house in Ohio, United States

- U.S. National Register of Historic Places
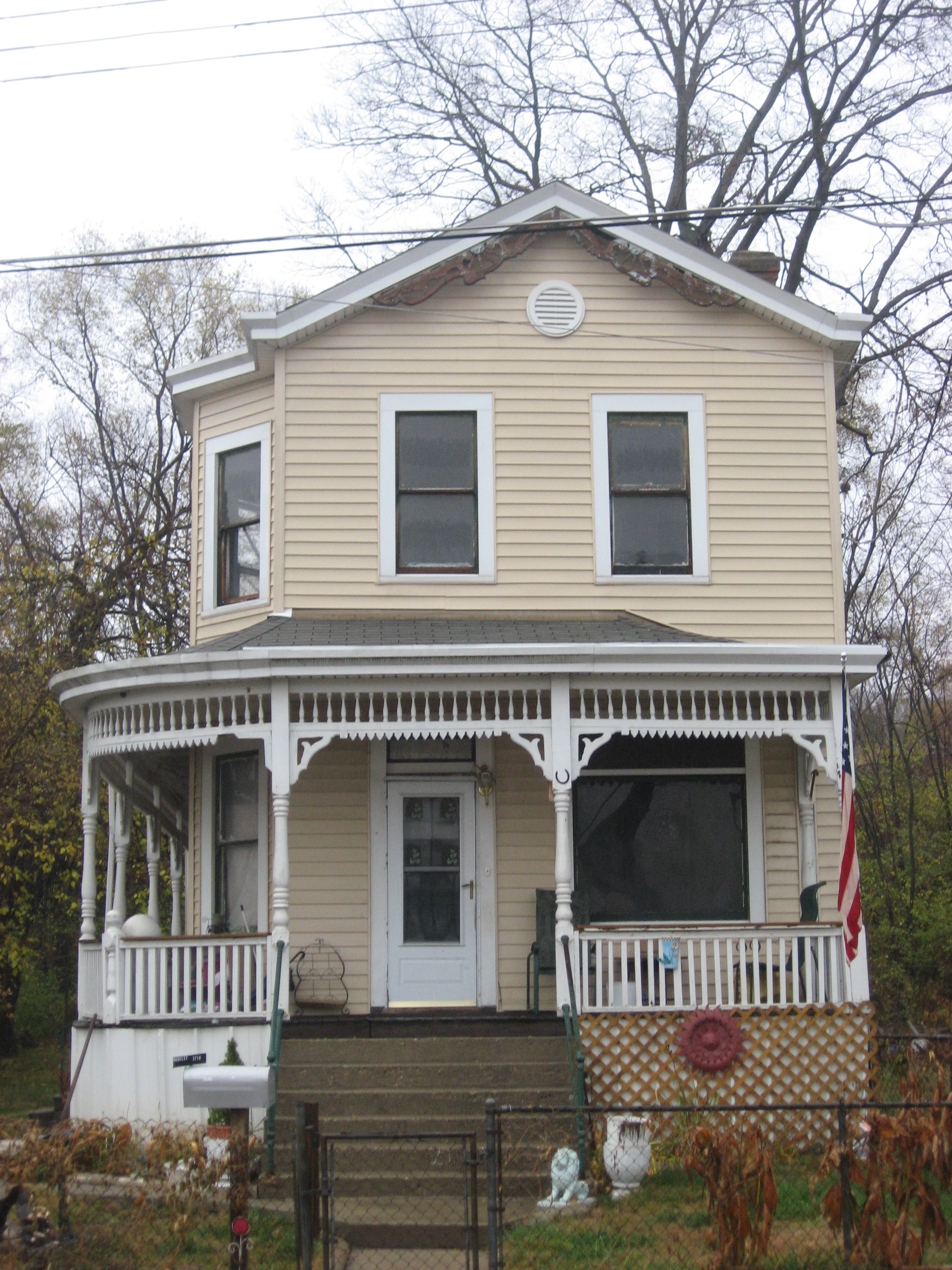
- Front of the house

- Location within Ohio Location within the United States
- Location: 3718 Mead Ave., Cincinnati, Ohio
- Coordinates: 39°6′45″N 84°26′18″W
- Area: Less than 1 acre (0.40 ha)
- Built: 1894
- Architectural style: Victorian
- MPS: Columbia-Tusculum MRA
- NRHP reference No.: 79002705
- Added to NRHP: August 24, 1979

The LuNeack House is a historic residence in the Columbia-Tusculum neighborhood of Cincinnati, Ohio, United States. Built in 1894, it is a frame building with clapboard walls, two-and-a-half stories tall. The overall floor plan of the house is that of a rectangle, with the front and rear being the shorter sides, although the original shape has been modified by the extension of the rear and a hexagonal bay on the western side.

Architecturally, the most distinctive portion of the LuNeack House is the large porch, which is attached to the southward-facing front of the house. Many ornamental elements compose its walls and railings, such as spindles and a balustrade; moreover, the porch-facing windows feature prominent lintels. Additionally, the gables that rise to the roof are the locations of other details, such as imbricated shingles, circular windows, and elaborately carven bargeboards.

Taken together, the various components of the LuNeack House form a well-preserved example of the Victorian style of architecture. Because the house has seen so few modifications since its original construction, it is architecturally distinctive; in 1978, a historic preservation survey of Columbia-Tusculum called it "outstanding" among the area's wooden Victorian residences. One year later, the house was listed on the National Register of Historic Places due to its historically significant architecture. It was one of seventeen Columbia-Tusculum properties included in a multiple property submission related to the previous year's historic preservation survey; most of the properties were buildings, but the Columbia Baptist and Fulton-Presbyterian Cemeteries were also included.
