= Stephen Decker Rowhouse =

Historic house in Ohio, United States

- U.S. National Register of Historic Places
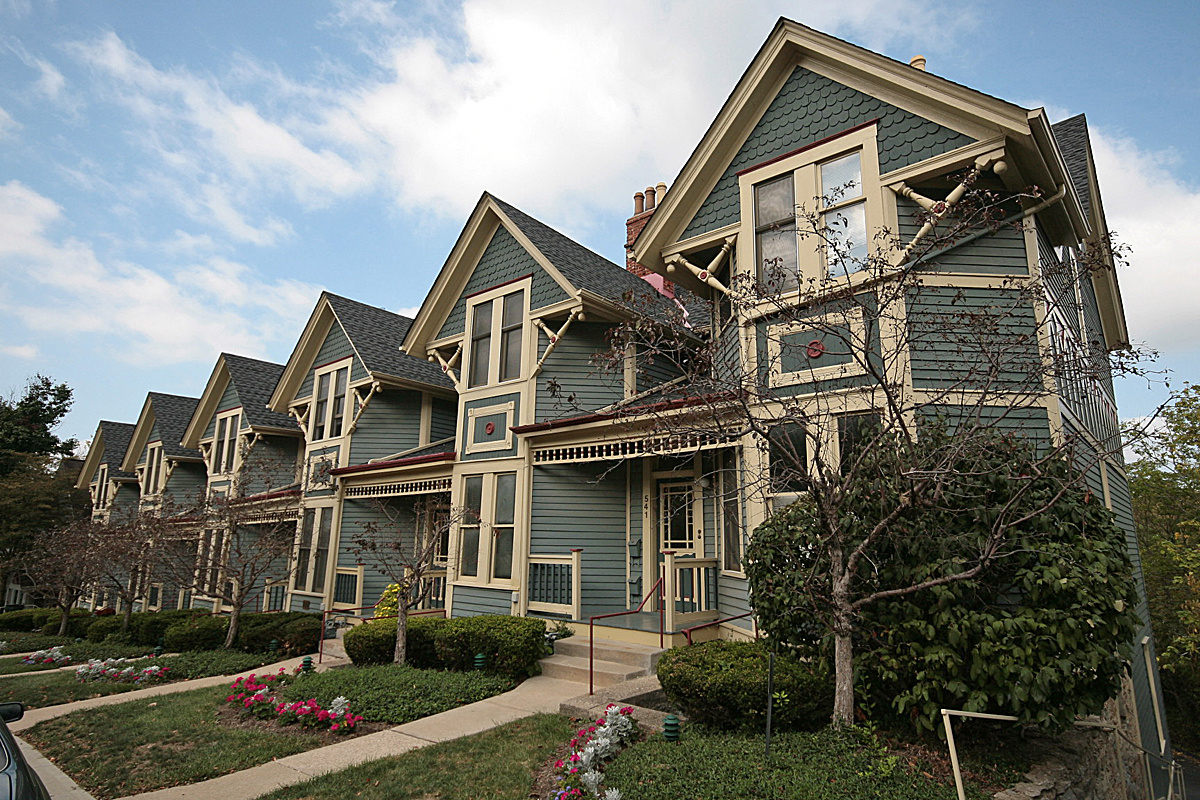
- Street view of the rowhouse

- Location within Ohio Location within the United States
- Location: 531-541 Tusculum Ave., Cincinnati, Ohio
- Coordinates: 39°6′56″N 84°26′0″W
- Area: Less than 1 acre (0.40 ha)
- Built: 1889
- Architectural style: Late Victorian
- MPS: Columbia-Tusculum MRA
- NRHP reference No.: 79002693
- Added to NRHP: August 24, 1979

The Stephen Decker Rowhouse is a historic multiple residence in the Columbia-Tusculum neighborhood of Cincinnati, Ohio, United States. Built in 1889, it occupies land that was originally a portion of the wide vineyards of Nicholas Longworth. In 1869, after his death, Longworth's estate was platted and sold to builders who constructed a residential neighborhood along Tusculum Avenue. One of the most unusual buildings was the Decker rowhouse, which features multiple distinctive Victorian elements. Chief among these is the ornamentation on the porch roofs: they include gabled rooflines and beveled corners supported by multiple spindles. Connecting these porch roofs are low normal roofs, which primarily protect the recessed entrances to the houses. Elsewhere, the houses feature double-hung windows, imbricated shingles on the gables, and arcades of Gothic Revival panelling, and numerous ornamental circles inscribed within squares. Taken as a single building, the rowhouse measures two bays wide and eighteen bays long; it is of frame construction and two stories tall. Rated "outstanding" by an architectural survey in 1978, it is the only rowhouse of its type in Cincinnati, due to its well-preserved Victorian architecture.

In 1979, the Stephen Decker Rowhouse was listed on the National Register of Historic Places because of its historically significant architecture, as had been recognized by the survey of the previous year. It was one of seventeen Columbia-Tusculum properties included in a multiple property submission related to that survey; most of the properties were buildings, but the Columbia Baptist and Fulton-Presbyterian Cemeteries were also included.
