= Mardot Antique Shop =

- U.S. National Register of Historic Places
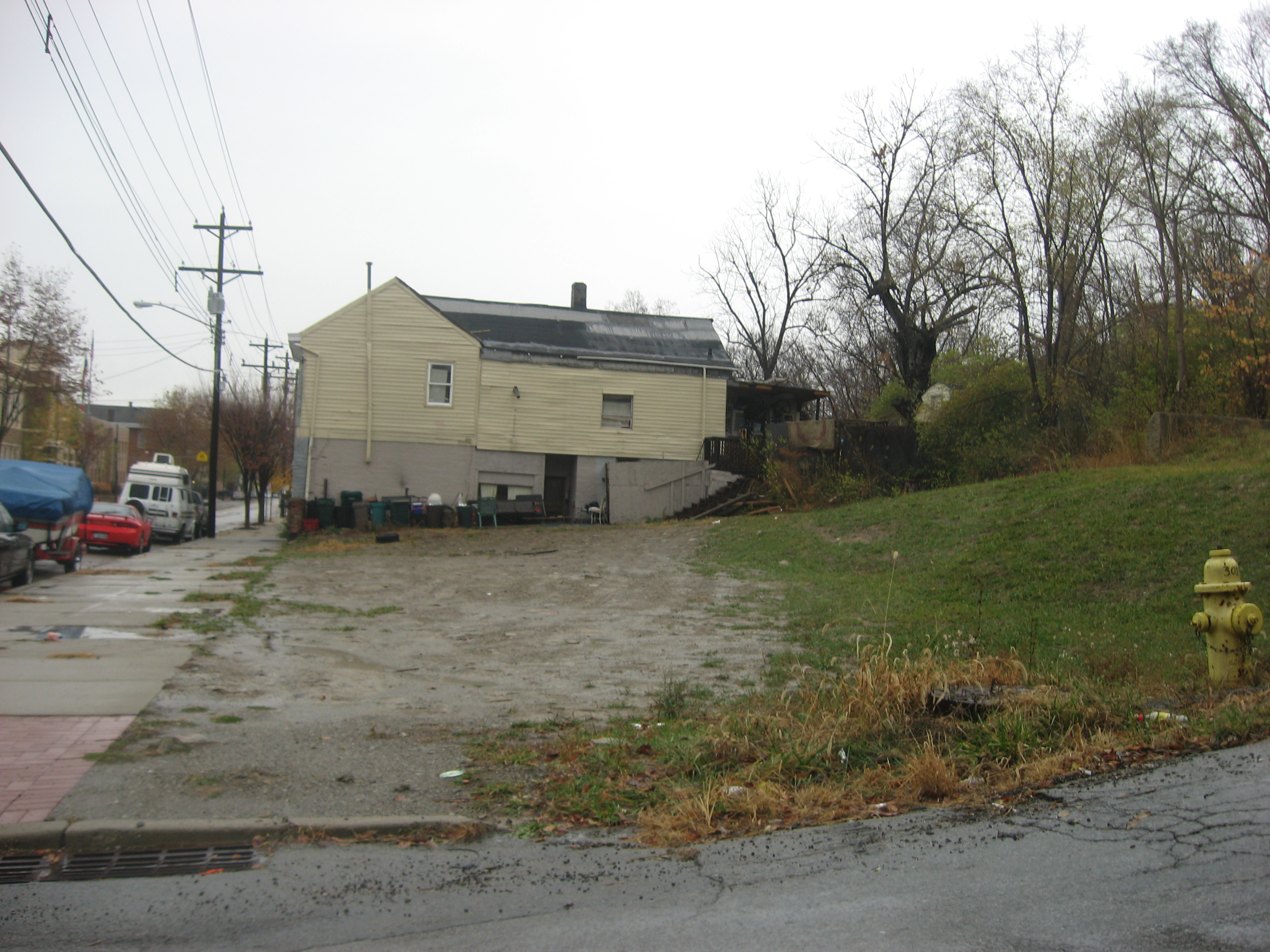
- Site of the antique shop

- Location within Ohio Location within the United States
- Location: 3964 Eastern Ave., Cincinnati, Ohio
- Coordinates: 39°6′32″N 84°25′57″W
- Area: Less than 1 acre (0.40 ha)
- Built: 1889
- MPS: Columbia-Tusculum MRA
- NRHP reference No.: 79002698
- Added to NRHP: August 24, 1979

The Mardot Antique Shop was a historic commercial building in the Columbia-Tusculum neighborhood of Cincinnati, Ohio, United States. Built in 1889, it was a weatherboarded structure with a slate roof and built on a stone foundation. Three stories tall, the building was a simple rectangle, two bays by three, and it featured a simple symmetrical facade with a cast iron front and many windows. Other architectural features included multiple dormers in the roof (a mansard roof), a small cornice with brackets, and a recessed portion of the storefront surrounding the main entrance.

In 1979, the Mardot was listed on the National Register of Historic Places due to its historically significant architecture, which was deemed to be in excellent condition. It was one of seventeen Columbia-Tusculum properties included in a multiple property submission related to a historic preservation survey conducted in the previous year; most of the properties were buildings, but the Columbia Baptist and Fulton-Presbyterian Cemeteries were also included. Despite this distinction, the Mardot Antique Shop has been demolished; the site is now an empty lot.
