= Columbia Cemetery =

Columbia Cemetery may refer to:

- Columbia Cemetery (Boulder, Colorado), listed on the NRHP in Colorado
- Columbia Cemetery (Columbia, Missouri), listed on the NRHP in Missouri
- Columbia Baptist Cemetery, Cincinnati, Ohio, listed on the NRHP in Ohio
