= Bates Building =

- U.S. National Register of Historic Places
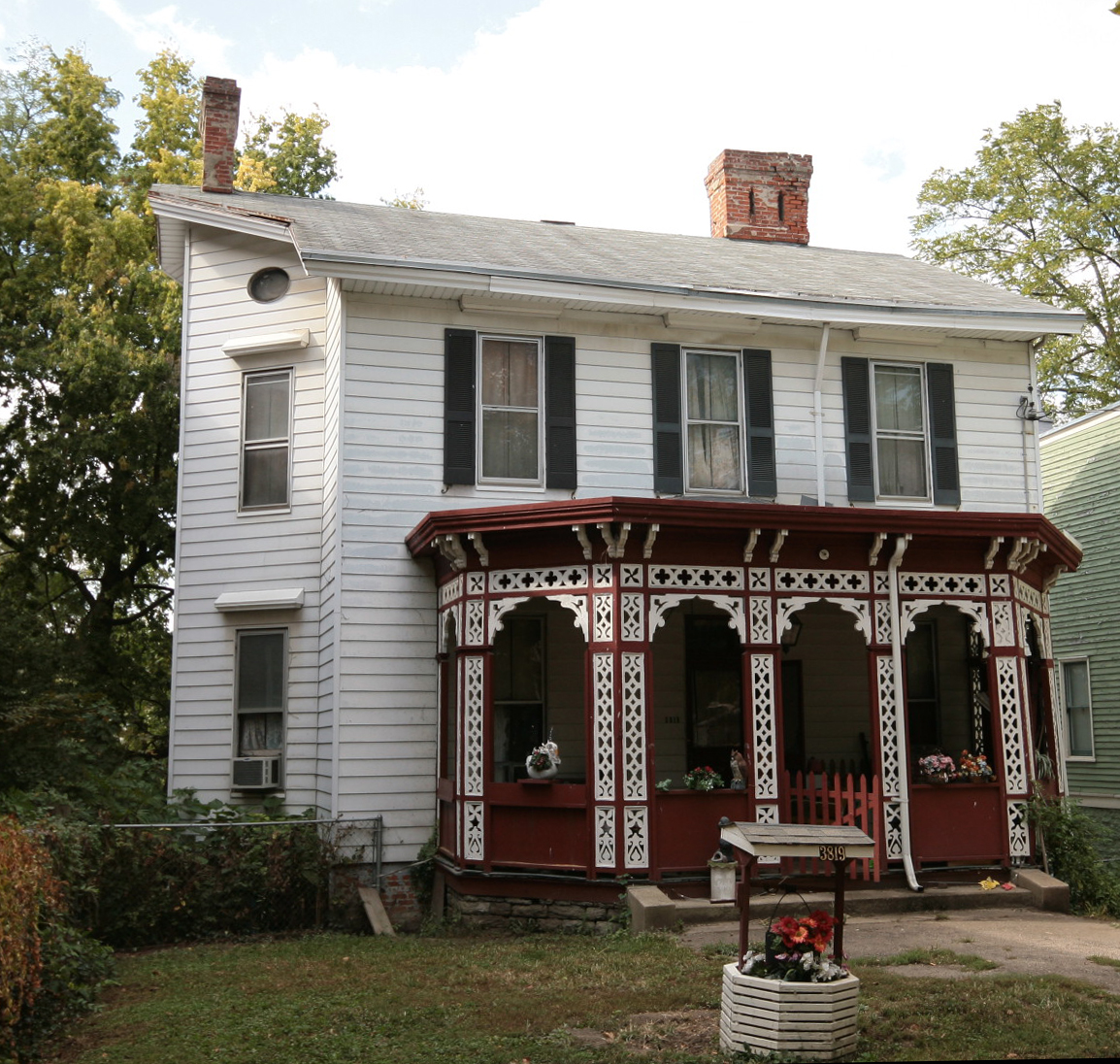
- Front of the house

- Location within Ohio Location within the United States
- Location: 3819 Eastern Ave., Cincinnati, Ohio
- Coordinates: 39°6′40″N 84°26′8″W
- Area: Less than 1 acre (0.40 ha)
- Built: 1865
- MPS: Columbia-Tusculum MRA
- NRHP reference No.: 79002700
- Added to NRHP: August 24, 1979

The Bates Building is a historic house in the Columbia-Tusculum neighborhood of Cincinnati, Ohio, United States. A two-story building constructed in a vernacular style of architecture, it is one of the oldest buildings on Eastern Avenue in the neighborhood.

Constructed in 1865, the Bates Building is a simple frame building with a gabled roof of shingles; it is three bays wide, and each side is a single bay. A significant exception to the house's simple construction is the ornate front porch, which appears to have been built after the rest of the house; complicated beveled woodwork covers the pillars of the porch. The eastern side of the house is otherwise the most distinctive part of the building; an outward projection on that side is the only exception to the house's rectangular shape, and included in the projection is a small oval window, which is the only non-rectangular window in the house.

In 1979, the Bates Building was listed on the National Register of Historic Places due to its historically significant architecture. It was one of seventeen Columbia-Tusculum properties included in a multiple property submission related to a historic preservation survey that had been conducted in the previous few years; most of the properties were buildings, but the Columbia Baptist and Fulton-Presbyterian Cemeteries were also included.
