= Spencer Township Hall =

- Spencer Town Hall
- U.S. National Register of Historic Places
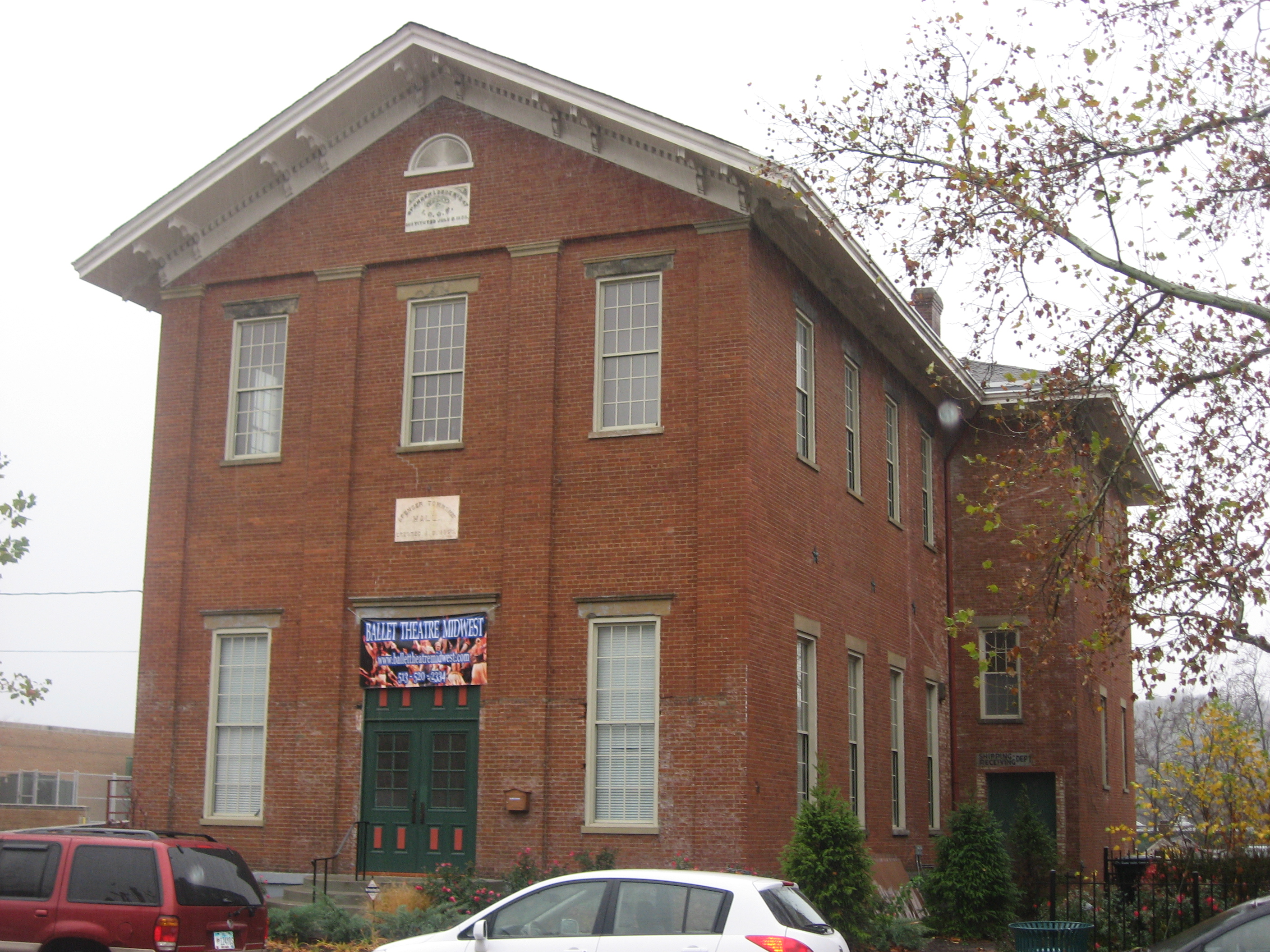
- Front and western side

- Location within Ohio Location within the United States
- Location: 3833 Eastern Ave., Cincinnati, Ohio
- Coordinates: 39°6′39″N 84°26′6″W
- Area: Less than 1 acre (0.40 ha)
- Built: 1860
- MPS: Columbia-Tusculum MRA
- NRHP reference No.: 79002701
- Added to NRHP: August 24, 1979

The Spencer Township Hall is a historic former government building in the Columbia-Tusculum neighborhood of Cincinnati, Ohio, United States. One of Cincinnati's oldest extant public buildings, it has been designated a historic site because of its architecture.

== Architecture ==
Constructed in 1860, the township hall is a two-story brick building with a stone foundation, a shingled roof, and miscellaneous elements of stone. Many small elements combine to give the building a Greek Revival flavor, including its pilasters, the capitals on its columns, and the simple windowsills and lintels. Among its lesser details are a bracketed overhanging roof, which adds an Italianate appearance, and a pair of datestones above the main entrance — one commemorating the local IOOF lodge, and the other marking the building as the township hall. When originally built, the hall was three bays wide and six bays long, although it was later expanded by the construction of an addition to the front.

== Activities ==
The building originally served as the seat of government of Spencer Township, which has since been annexed by Cincinnati. Besides serving as the township hall, the building was originally the meeting place for the IOOF lodge whose datestone appears on the facade; the lodge was chartered just one year before the building was built. In the late 1970s, the building was no longer used as a government or fraternal building, but despite the presence of the unsympathetic addition to the facade, it was still seen as a high-quality work of institutional architecture. By this time, it had been adaptively reused, and it was home to an engineering firm, which decided to remove the front addition in conjunction with a grassroots effort to revitalize the neighborhood. By the early 2010s, it had become home to a dance studio.

In 1979, the Spencer Township Hall was listed on the National Register of Historic Places due to its historically significant architecture. It was one of seventeen Columbia-Tusculum properties included in a multiple property submission related to a historic preservation survey conducted in the previous year; most of the properties were buildings, but the Columbia Baptist and Fulton-Presbyterian Cemeteries were also included.
