= Kellogg House (Cincinnati, Ohio) =

- U.S. National Register of Historic Places
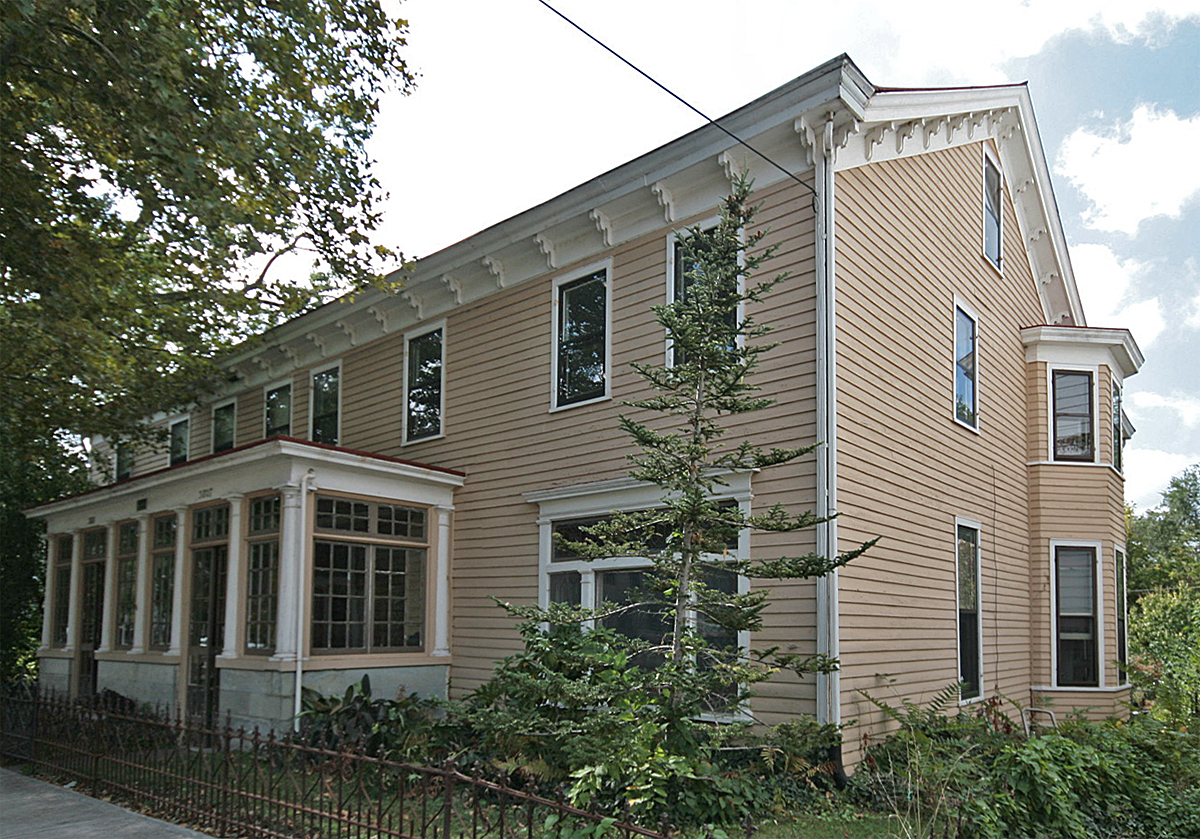
- Front and western side of the house

- Location within Ohio Location within the United States
- Location: 3807 Eastern Ave., Cincinnati, Ohio
- Coordinates: 39°6′41″N 84°26′9″W
- Area: Less than 1 acre (0.40 ha)
- Built: 1835
- Architect: Samuel Knicely
- Architectural style: Federal
- MPS: Columbia-Tusculum MRA
- NRHP reference No.: 79002702
- Added to NRHP: August 24, 1979

The Kellogg House is a historic building in the Columbia-Tusculum neighborhood of Cincinnati, Ohio, United States. Built in 1835, it is a two-and-a-half-story building with two prominent chimneys on the ends. The weatherboarded walls rest on a stone foundation and are covered by a metal roof, which rises to a high gable on each end. The building's architecture is a mix of the Federal style with many vernacular elements; it has been recognized as one of the area's best examples of transitional architecture. Some of the distinctive features of the Kellogg Building are the small brackets that support the simple cornice, two wings attached to the rear, and the two enclosed porches on the facade. Inside, the main hallway is ornamented by such features as intricate fretwork and multiple pillars. Main hallway is also occupied by the homes original pipe organ.

Historically, the Kellogg House was operated as a hotel; it was erected by Samuel Knicely in 1835 and given to a Mr. Kellogg seven years later as a wedding gift. From that time until 1977, it remained in the Kellogg family, although by the late 1970s it had been converted into apartments. In 1979, it was listed on the National Register of Historic Places due to its historically significant architecture. It was one of seventeen Columbia-Tusculum properties included in a multiple property submission related to a historic preservation survey in the previous year; most of the properties were buildings, but the Columbia Baptist and Fulton-Presbyterian Cemeteries were also included.
