= Antique shop (disambiguation) =

An antique shop is a retail store specializing in the selling of antiques.

Antique shop may also refer to:

- Mardot Antique Shop, a historic building in Ohio, United States
- The Antique Shop, a 2022 Thai-Singaporean horror movie
