= Spencer Township, Hamilton County, Ohio =

Former township in Hamilton County, Ohio, United States

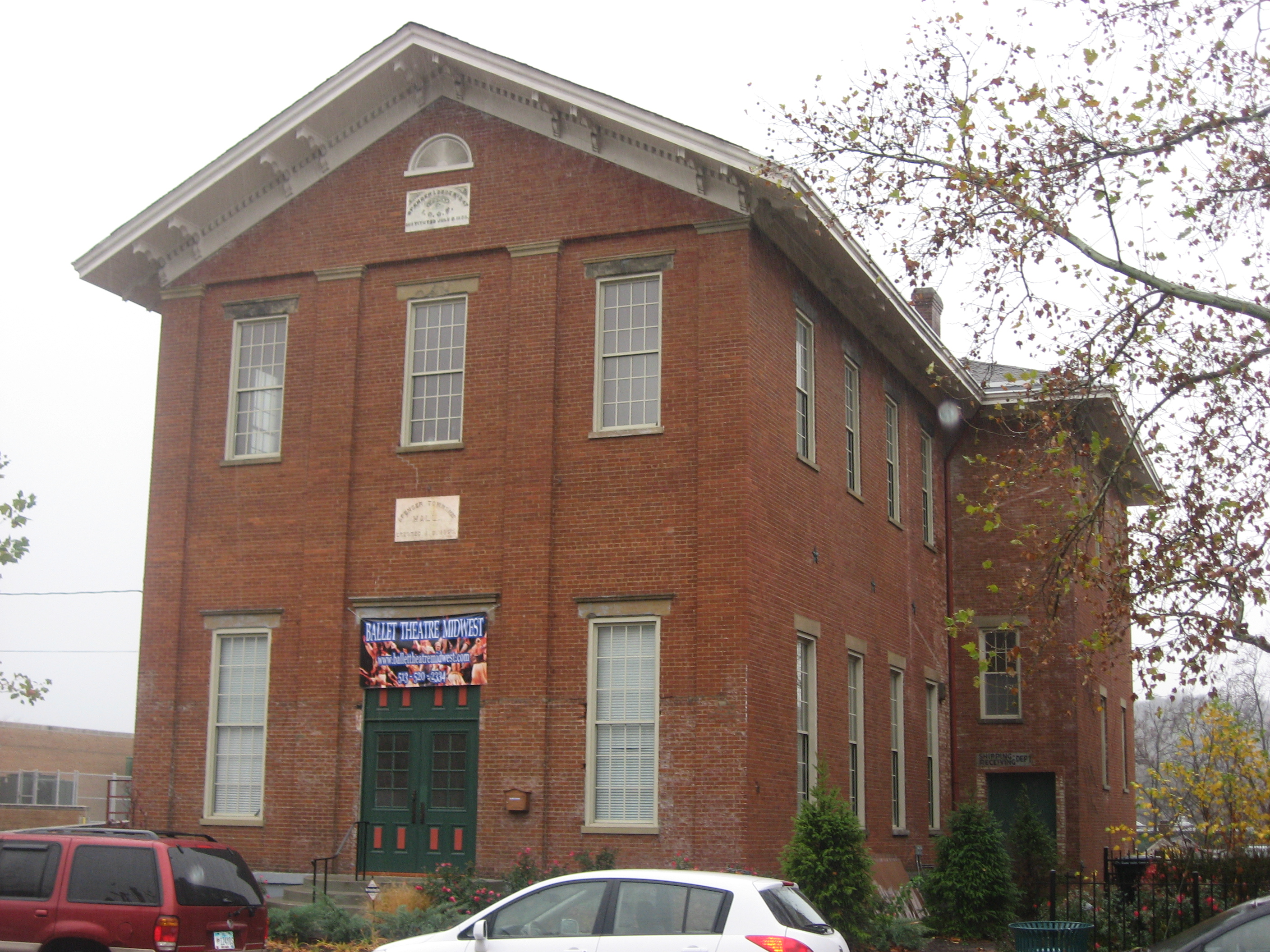
Spencer Township Hall in 2010

Spencer Township was a civil township in southeastern Hamilton County, Ohio. It was established in the early 1840s and annexed to Cincinnati in stages from 1855 to 1909.

== Name ==
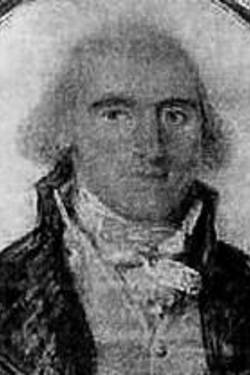
Oliver Spencer

Spencer Township was named after Colonel Oliver Spencer, an early resident of Columbia Township. Statewide, other townships named Spencer are located in Allen, Guernsey, Lucas, and Medina counties.

== History ==
The land that would become Spencer Township was included in the 1794 Symmes Purchase. It included Columbia, the first white settlement in the historical Miami Valley, in the present-day Columbia-Tusculum neighborhood of Cincinnati. In 1791, the area became part of Columbia Township.

In the early 1840s, Spencer Township was carved out of the suburban southwestern portion of Columbia Township, which was otherwise largely rural.

On January 1, 1855, the shipbuilding village of Fulton, which had already withdrawn from Spencer Township as Fulton Township, was annexed to Cincinnati following a vote by residents of the village.

Spencer Township Hall was built in 1860 to serve as the seat of government as well as the local lodge of the Independent Order of Odd Fellows.

In 1870, Cincinnati annexed East Walnut Hills, O'Bryonville and Mount Lookout. Cincinnati annexed Columbia and Pendleton (not to be confused with the Cincinnati neighborhood of that name) in 1871 and Tusculum in 1875.

As late as 1881, Linwood, East Linwood, Russell's, Turkey Bottom, and part of Red Bank remained within the township. In 1893, Cincinnati annexed Linwood. In August 1909, Cincinnati annexed the southern part of Spencer Township, including Turkey Bottom, on the way to California, which desired the city's police and fire protection after Coney Island opened there. The rest of Spencer Township became part of the city in September 1909 and was attached to Cincinnati Township in October 1909.

== Geography ==
An 1856 map of Hamilton County depicting Spencer Township in green.

At its inception, Spencer Township was bounded by the Ohio River to the south, Cincinnati and Millcreek Township to the west, Columbia Township to the north, and Anderson Township to the east across the Little Miami River. This area today is wholly located within the Cincinnati city limits, corresponding to parts of Evanston, Hyde Park, Mount Lookout, Columbia-Tusculum, Linwood, and the East End.

== Demographics ==
In June 1880, there were 2,543 residents in Spencer Township, of whom 995 resided in areas annexed to Cincinnati.
