= Clauder's Pharmacy =

Historic building in Cincinnati, Ohio, US

- U.S. National Register of Historic Places
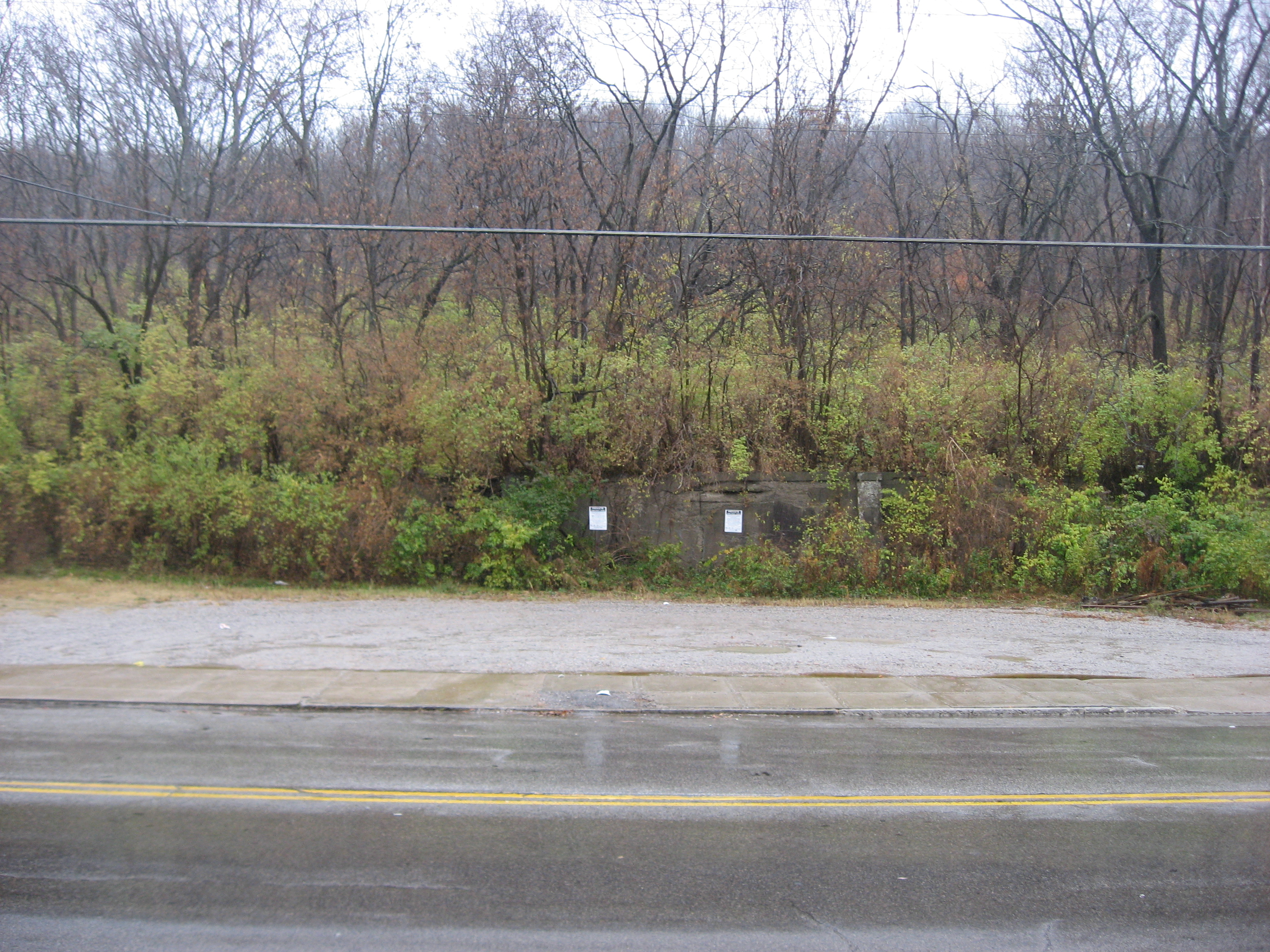
- Site of the pharmacy in 2010

- Location within Ohio Location within the United States
- Location: 4026 Eastern Ave., Cincinnati, Ohio
- Coordinates: 39°6′31″N 84°25′56″W
- MPS: Columbia-Tusculum MRA (64000615)
- NRHP reference No.: 79002696
- Added to NRHP: 24 August 1979

Clauder's Pharmacy was a historic building in Cincinnati, Ohio. It was listed in the National Register of Historic Places on August 24, 1979. The address of the site is 4026 Eastern Avenue.

== See also ==
- Historic preservation
- L.B. Robb Drugstore
- National Register of Historic Places listings in eastern Cincinnati
