= Linwood, Cincinnati =

Linwood
- Neighborhood of Cincinnati
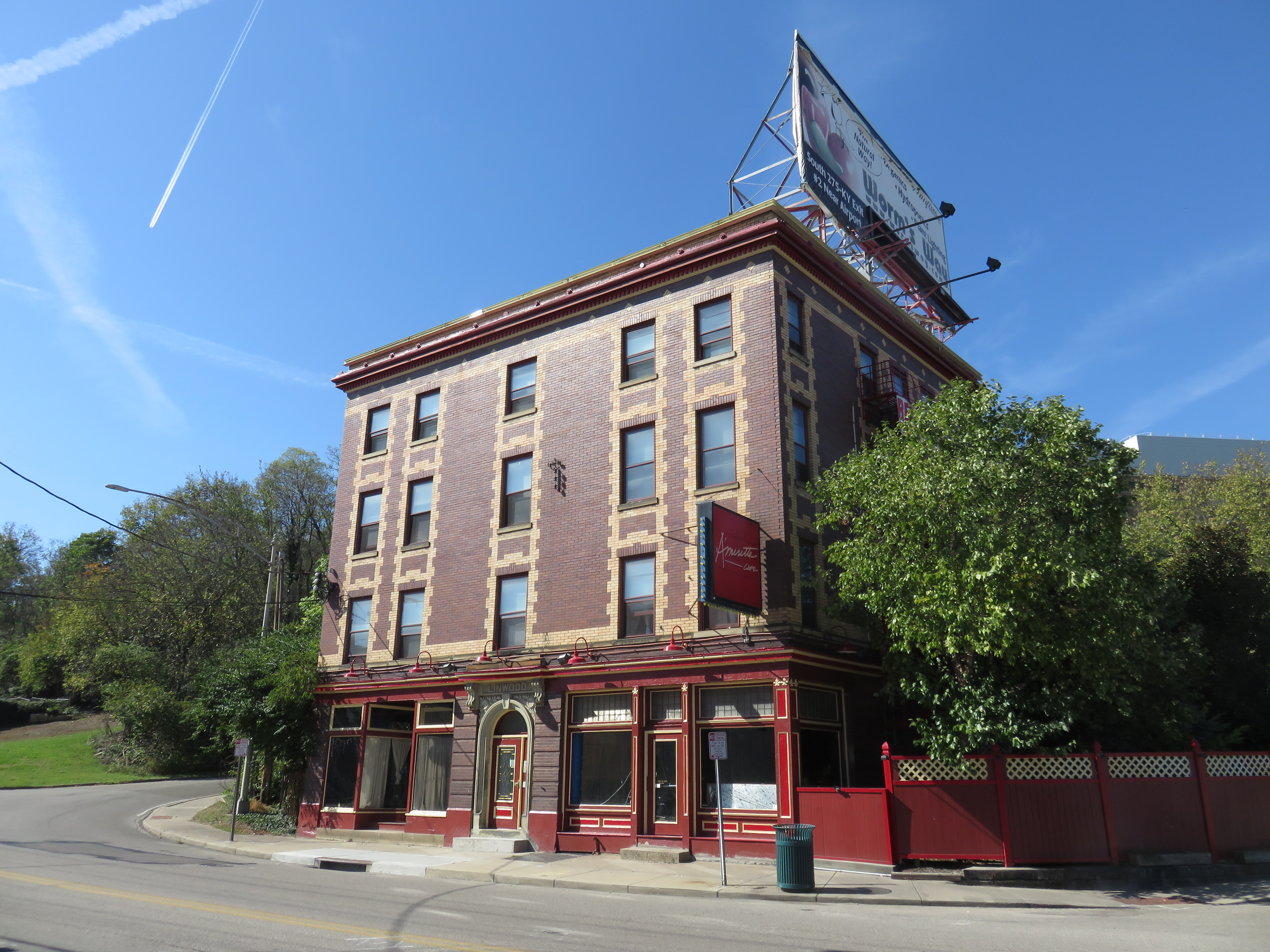
- Building in Linwood

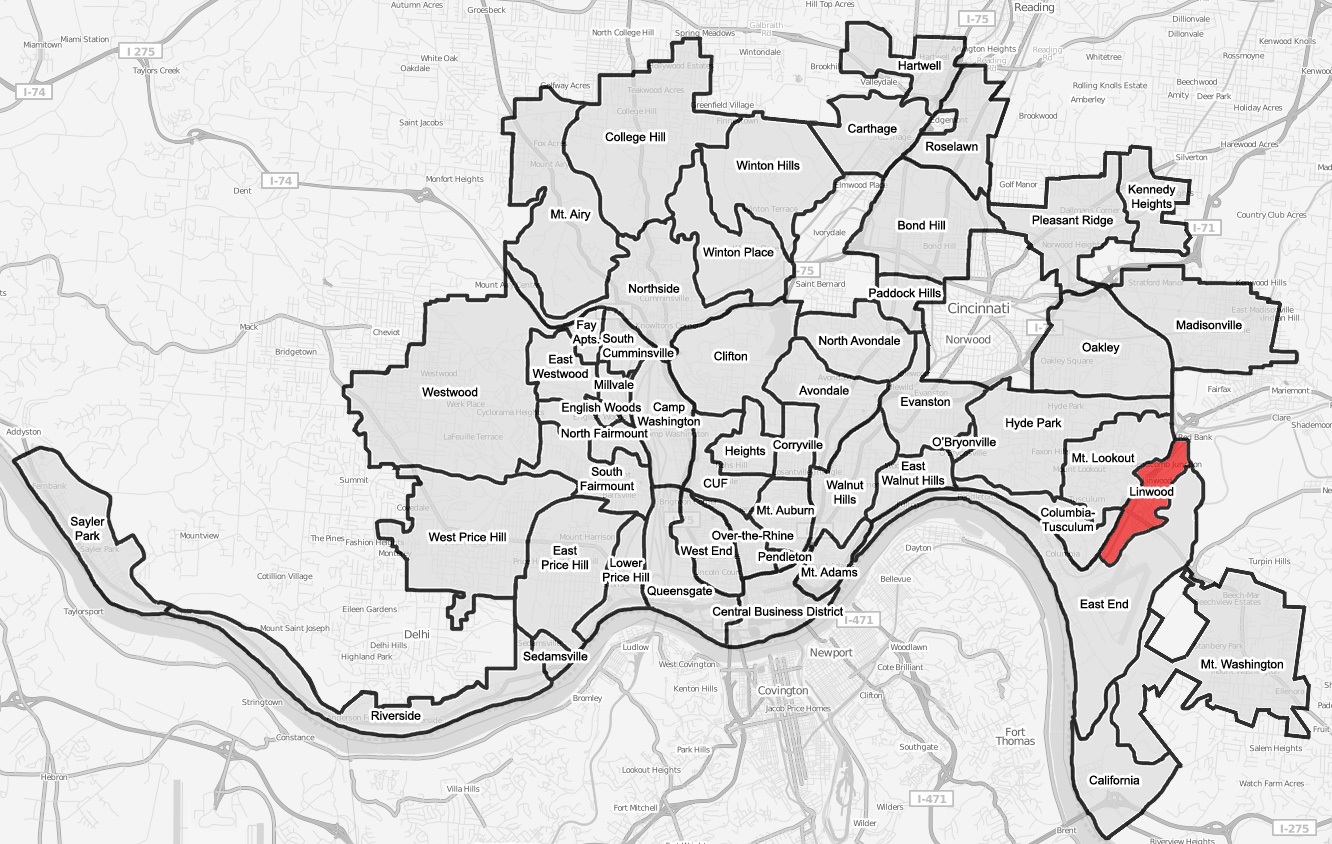
- Linwood (red) within Cincinnati, OH
- Coordinates: 39°7′15″N 84°24′48″W
- Country: United States
- State: Ohio
- County: Hamilton
- City: Cincinnati

Population (2020)
  - Total: 705

Linwood is one of the 52 neighborhoods of Cincinnati, Ohio, United States. Annexed in 1893, it is located in the eastern part of the city. The population was 705 at the 2020 census.

== History ==
Linwood was incorporated as a village in 1874. Originally part of Spencer Township, the east side village was annexed by the City of Cincinnati in 1893. In the 19th century, Linwood was situated on the Little Miami Railroad.

== Demographics ==
As of the census of 2020, there were 705 people living in the neighborhood. There were 393 housing units. The racial makeup of the neighborhood was 82.6% White, 7.8% Black or African American, 0.0% Native American, 0.3% Asian, 0.0% Pacific Islander, 1.0% from some other race, and 8.4% from two or more races. 3.0% of the population were Hispanic or Latino of any race.

There were 206 households, out of which 34.5% were families. 51.0% of all households were made up of individuals.

12.5% of the neighborhood's population were under the age of 18, 82.4% were 18 to 64, and 5.1% were 65 years of age or older. 50.4% of the population were male and 49.6% were female.

According to the U.S. Census American Community Survey, for the period 2016-2020 the estimated median annual income for a household in the neighborhood was $64,444. About 5.6% of family households were living below the poverty line. About 18.3% had a bachelor's degree or higher.
