= Columbia-Tusculum, Cincinnati =

Neighborhood in Cincinnati

Coordinates: 39°7′N 84°26′W

Columbia-Tusculum
- Neighborhood
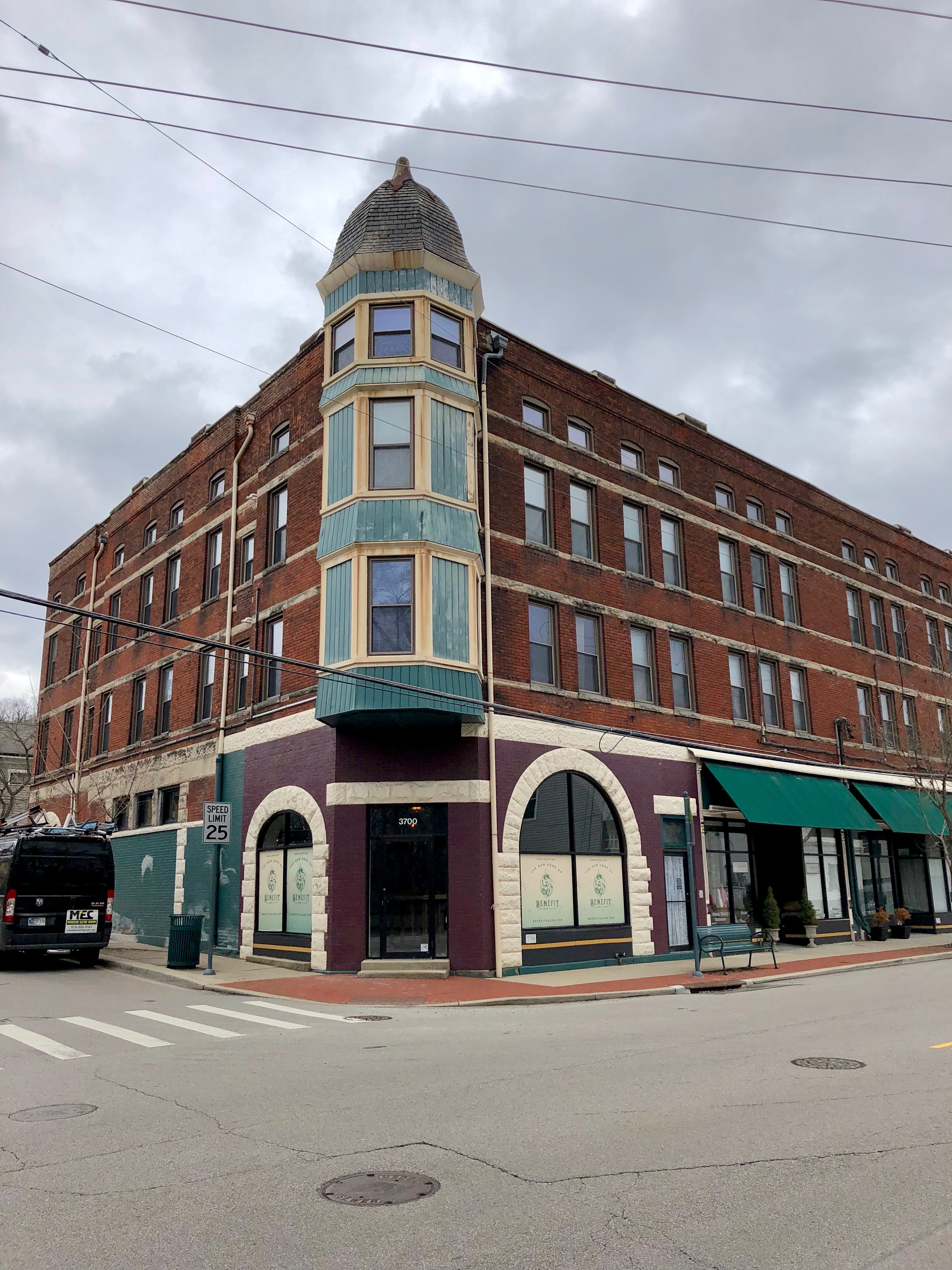
- Eastern Avenue in Columbia-Tusculum, Cincinnati

- Flag

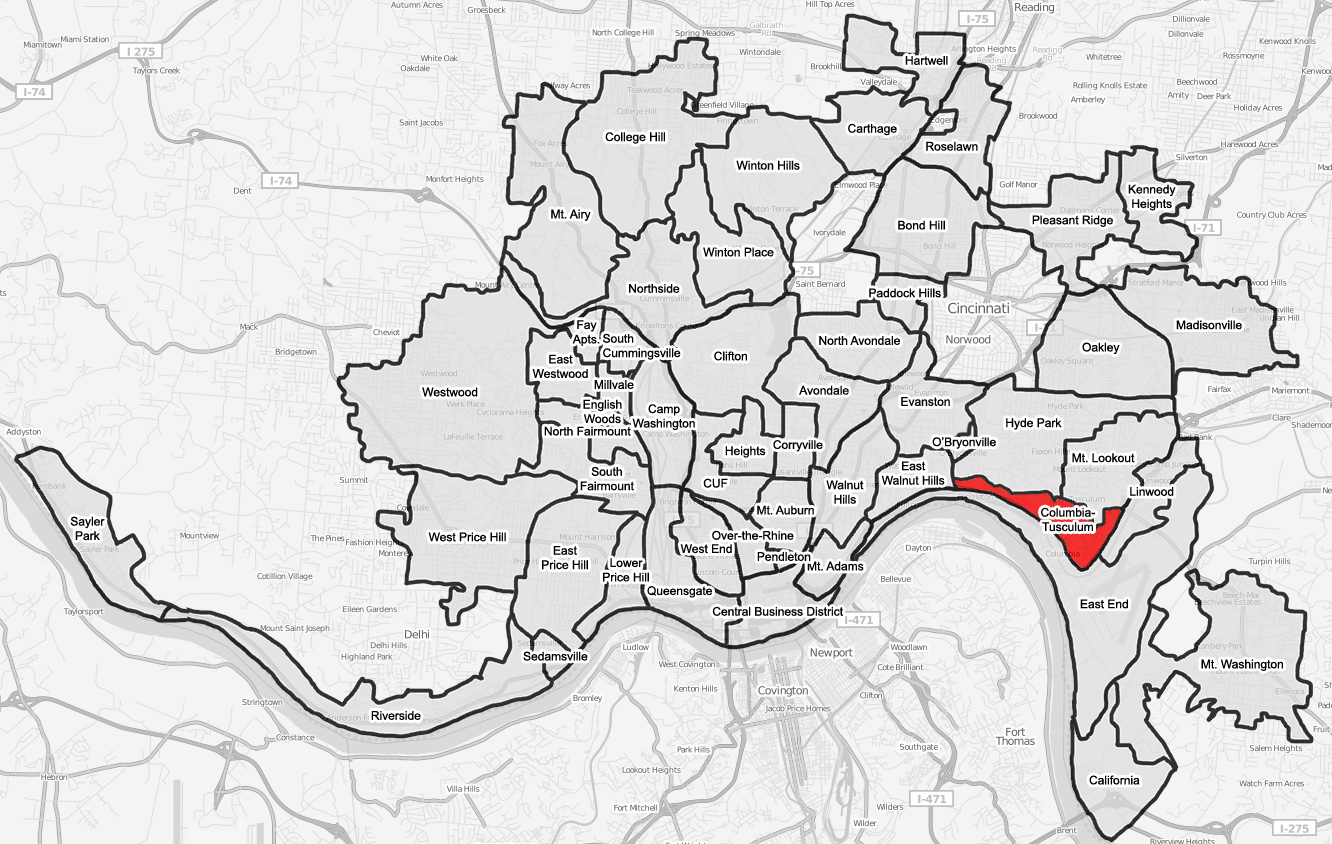
- Columbia-Tusculum (red) within Cincinnati, Ohio
- Country: United States
- State: Ohio
- County: Hamilton
- City: Cincinnati

Population (2020)
  - Total: 1,523

Columbia-Tusculum is one of the 52 neighborhoods of Cincinnati, Ohio. Founded in 1788 and annexed in 1871, it is the city's oldest neighborhood. The population was 1,523 at the 2020 census.

== History ==
Columbia was founded in 1788 on the Little Miami River and predates Losantiville (which became Cincinnati) by a month. The first Protestant church (Baptist) in the Northwest Territory was erected in Columbia. The Cincinnati area's first school opened here in 1790. Many of the early settlers are buried in the former Columbia Baptist Cemetery, founded in 1790. The cemetery is now known as the Pioneer Memorial Cemetery.

In 1791, Columbia became part of Columbia Township. From the early 1840s, it was included in Spencer Township, until Cincinnati annexed it in 1871. Tusculum was annexed in 1875.

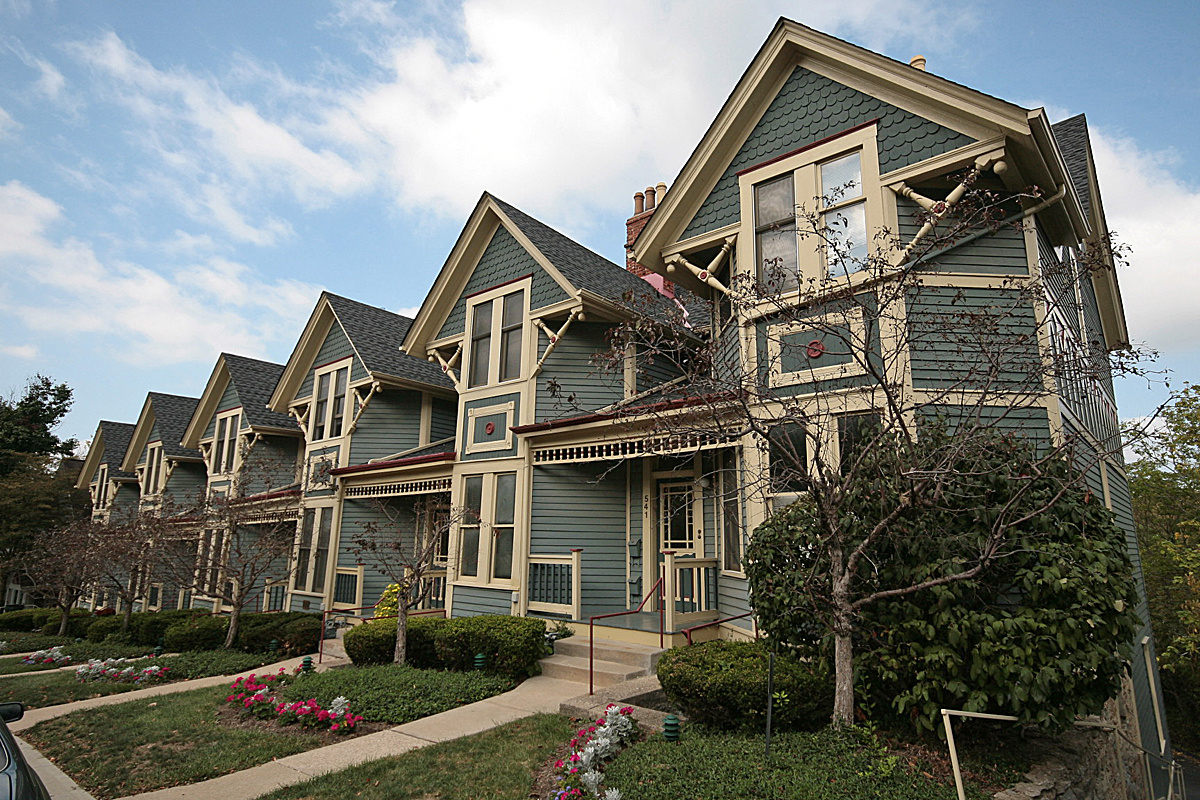
Stephen Decker Rowhouse

The neighborhood is noted for its Victorian era homes decorated in the painted ladies multi-color style. Designated historic structures in the neighborhood include the Bates Building, Kellogg House, LuNeack House, Norwell Residence, Spencer Township Hall, and the Stephen Decker Rowhouse.

== Demographics ==
Population of 1990-2020
Year	Pop.	±%
1990	3,051	—
2000	3,081	+1.0%
2010	1,304	−57.7%
2020	1,523	+16.8%
Boundaries of neighborhood changed in 2010 - reflective of population decrease.

As of the census of 2020, there were 1,523 people living in the neighborhood. There were 795 housing units. The racial makeup of the neighborhood was 88.0% White, 2.2% Black or African American, 0.0% Native American, 3.9% Asian, 0.0% Pacific Islander, 0.2% from some other race, and 5.6% from two or more races. 2.3% of the population were Hispanic or Latino of any race.

There were 684 households, out of which 40.2% were families. 41.5% of all households were made up of individuals.

15.0% of the neighborhood's population were under the age of 18, 79.0% were 18 to 64, and 6.0% were 65 years of age or older. 47.0% of the population were male and 53.0% were female.

According to the U.S. Census American Community Survey, for the period 2016-2020 the estimated median annual income for a household in the neighborhood was $113,194. About 0.0% of family households were living below the poverty line. About 74.5% had a bachelor's degree or higher.
