= Fulton-Presbyterian Cemetery =

United States historic place in Hamilton County, Ohio

- U.S. National Register of Historic Places
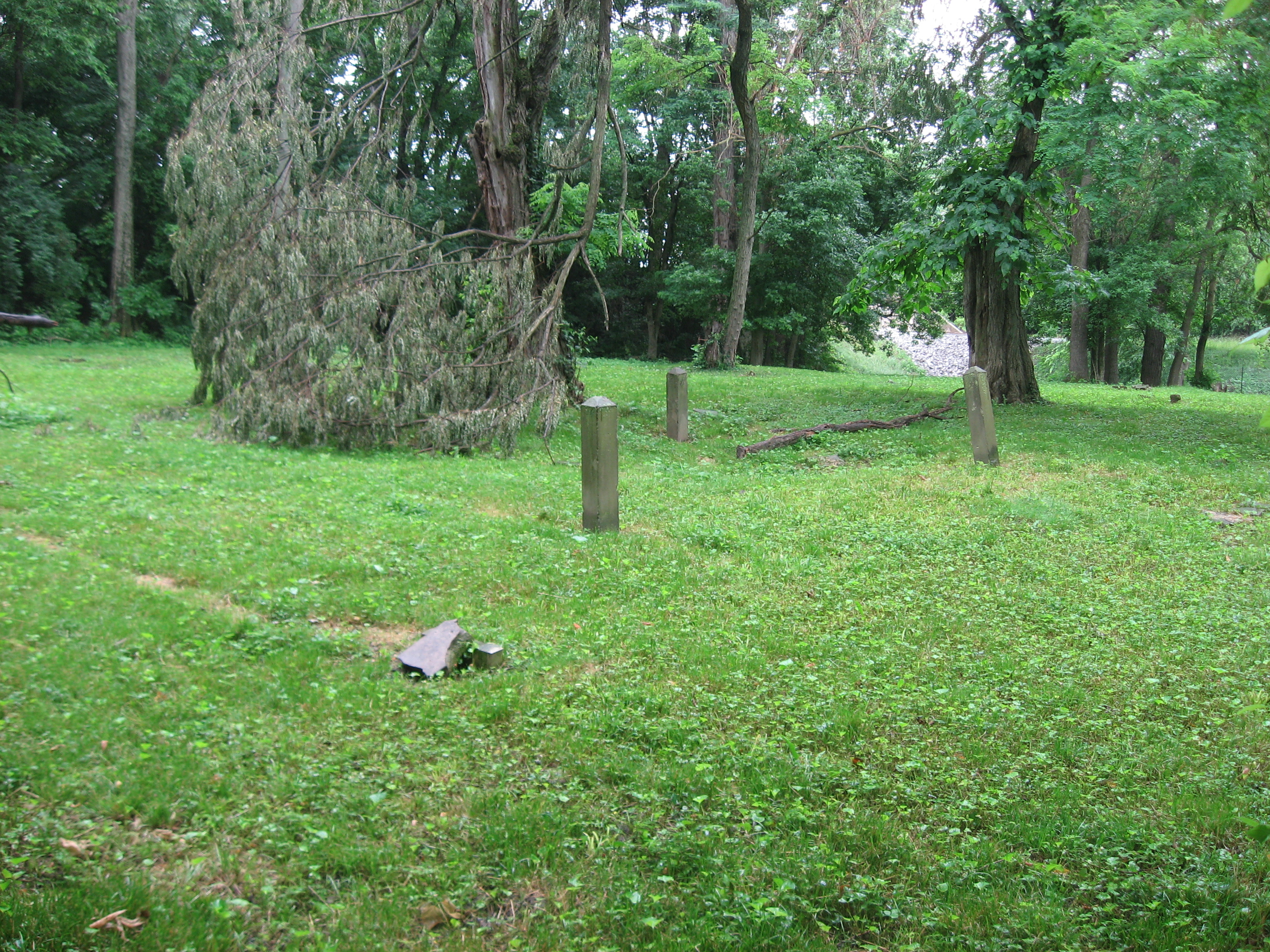
- Graves in the cemetery

- Location within Ohio Location within the United States
- Location: Cincinnati, Ohio
- Coordinates: 39°6′24″N 84°26′00″W
- Built: 1794
- MPS: Columbia-Tusculum MRA
- NRHP reference No.: 79002706
- Added to NRHP: August 24, 1979

Fulton-Presbyterian Cemetery is a registered historic site in Cincinnati, Ohio, United States. It was listed in the National Register on August 24, 1979.

== Historic uses ==
This is actually three adjacent but distinct cemeteries: Presbyterian Cemetery, Fulton Cemetery and Fulton Mechanick's Cemetery. The Presbytery of Cincinnati was awarded title to the Presbyterian Cemetery in 1970 by local courts in response to a suit for quiet title. The Court also charged the Presbytery with "use and care" of the two Fultons, but the Presbytery does not own the Fultons. Recorded deeds indicate the Fultons would be owned by the descendants of the original plot owners. The Presbyterian Cemetery dates to 1794 and is the final resting place of at least eight Revolutionary War veterans, allegedly including Sgt. Willam Brown, the first man to receive a Purple Heart from George Washington. Brown was active in the area, although his headstone has not been found and confirming documentation does not exist.

These cemeteries were severely vandalized and used as dumps since around 1900. Unfortunately the story about Brown being the first to receive the Purple Heart, or Badge of Merit, is incorrect. He was the second to receive the Badge of Merit. In 1999, Bart Rosenberg initiated a cleanup, preservation and restoration project which continued into 2012. The GPS coordinates given are within 25' of the entrance.

There is an Ohio Historical Marker along the Ohio River Trail that provides information on both the cemeteries and Sergeant Brown.
