= Pioneer Memorial Cemetery, Cincinnati =

Historic cemetery in Hamilton County, Ohio, US

- Columbia Baptist Cemetery
- U.S. National Register of Historic Places
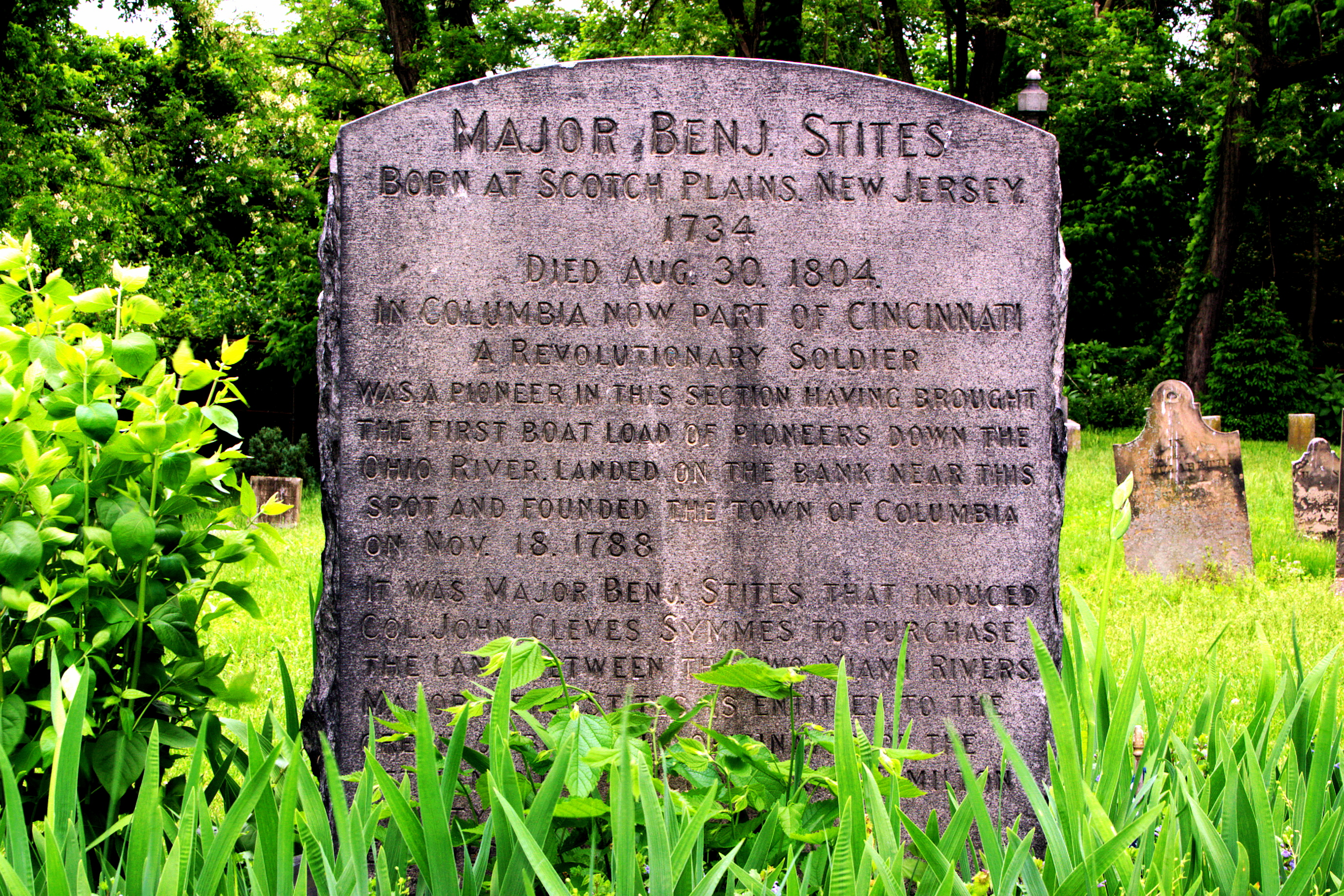
- Gravestone of Major Benjamin Stites.

- Location within Ohio Location within the United States
- Location: Cincinnati, Ohio
- Coordinates: 39°06′23″N 84°25′44″W
- Built: 1790
- MPS: Columbia-Tusculum MRA
- NRHP reference No.: 79002709
- Added to NRHP: August 24, 1979

The Pioneer Memorial Cemetery (also known as Columbia Baptist Church Cemetery) is a historic pioneer cemetery in the Columbia-Tusculum neighborhood of Cincinnati, Ohio, United States. It is located on a small hill overlooking Lunken Airport at 333 Wilmer Avenue on Cincinnati's east side.

The oldest cemetery in Hamilton County, it lies at the site of Columbia Baptist Church, founded in 1790. Columbia is the oldest settlement in Hamilton County, as it was founded in 1788, one month before Losantiville (later Cincinnati). The cemetery is the only extant remnant of the Columbia settlement.

Included in this cemetery is the grave of Major Benjamin Stites, 1734–1804, founding father of Columbia. The fellow founder of Columbia and pioneer, soldier, and legislator Ephraim Kibbey (1756–1809) is memorialized here on the monument "To the First Boat-load" erected in 1879.

Frederick L. Payne, then Supervising Horticulturalist for the Park Board, began a restoration project in 1967 for the cemetery.

The cemetery is listed on the National Register of Historic Places under its historic name of "Columbia Baptist Cemetery".

Since 1958, the Pioneer Cemetery has been known as an archaeological site — in that year, evidence was discovered that the terrace upon which the cemetery lies was once a Native American village site. Due to the presence of the cemetery, no excavation has ever been conducted there; consequently, all that is known about the village is that it was inhabited during the Woodland period.

The Cincinnati Parks Department maintains the property.
