= Natalie de Blois =

American architect

- Born: April 2, 1921; Paterson, New Jersey, US
- Died: July 22, 2013 (aged 92); Chicago, Illinois, US
- Education: Columbia University
- Occupation: Architect
- Practice: Skidmore, Owings & Merrill
- Buildings: Union Carbide Building, Lever House, Pepsi Cola Headquarters, Connecticut General Life Insurance Company Headquarters

Natalie Griffin de Blois (April 2, 1921 – July 22, 2013) was an American architect. Entering the field in 1944, she became one of the earliest prominent women in the male-dominated profession. She was a partner for many years in the firm of Skidmore, Owings and Merrill. Her notable works include the Pepsi Cola Headquarters, Lever House, and the Union Carbide Building in New York City; the Equitable Building in Chicago; the low-rise portions of the Ford World Headquarters in Dearborn, Michigan; and the Connecticut General Life Insurance Company Headquarters in Bloomfield, Connecticut. Several of de Blois' buildings are among the tallest woman-designed buildings in the world. She later taught architecture at the University of Texas in the 1980s and 1990s.

According to ArchDaily's Kayle Overstreet, De Blois's career legacy and body of work, "significantly changed the way that women can participate in the [architecture] profession [in the 21st century]".

== Early years ==
De Blois was born in Paterson, New Jersey, into a family of three generations of engineers. She was interested in architecture from an early age, saying in 2004, "I was selected to be the one that would go into art. I told my father that I wanted to be an architect from the age of ten or twelve." She attended the Western College for Women in Oxford, Ohio, and received an architecture degree from Columbia University in 1944. While at Columbia, she worked at Babcock & Wilcox during the summer and for Frederick John Kiesler.

== Architectural career ==
De Blois began her career at a New York firm, Ketchum, Giná & Sharp, but was fired after she "rebuffed the affections" of one of the firm's male architects. She then joined the architectural firm Skidmore, Owings and Merrill (SOM). While working at SOM, De Blois became known as a "pioneer" female architect in the "male-dominated world of architecture." She designed major business buildings on Park Avenue in New York City, including the Pepsi building and the Union Carbide Building (now known as the Chase Building). She worked with Gordon Bunshaft on the Pepsi building, which was completed in 1960 and was "praised by critics for its gem-like, seemingly levitating exterior walls of gray-green glass and aluminum."

In 1962, she transferred to the Chicago headquarters of SOM, where she worked on skyscrapers until 1974. While there, she founded the Chicago Women in Architecture. Richard Tomlinson, the managing partner of SOM's Chicago office, said it was the "best thing that ever happened to us", and De Blois was eventually promoted to associate partner in 1964. Her works in Chicago include the Equitable Building.

De Blois joined Neuhaus & Taylor (now known as 3-D International) in Houston in 1974. In 1980, she began teaching at the University of Texas School of Architecture, and was a faculty member until 1993. She died at age 92 in Chicago, and had her ashes scattered on Lake Michigan.

In 2014, De Blois was recognized for designing the Pepsi Cola World Headquarters and Union Carbide Building by the Beverly Willis Architecture Foundation, whose Built by Women New York City competition identified outstanding and diverse sites and spaces designed, engineered, and built by women. Willis said, "There wasn't anybody in the country quite like Natalie, because there was no one else working for a firm quite like Skidmore."

== Notable projects ==
- Union Carbide Building (later known as the Chase Building), 270 Park Avenue, New York – Completed 1960, de Blois Senior Designer
- New York State Building, 5 East 57th Street, New York – Designer of 1946 renovation
- Terrace Plaza Hotel, Cincinnati, Ohio – 1948, Design Coordinator
  - The Terrace Plaza's Gourmet Room restaurant, considered one of the most iconic public spaces in a landmark of modernist architecture.
- Lever House, New York – 1952, Design Coordinator
- Pepsi Cola Headquarters, 500 Park Avenue, New York – Senior Designer
- Emhart Manufacturing Company Building – 1962, Senior Designer
- Connecticut General Life Insurance Company Headquarters, Bloomfield, Connecticut – 1957, Senior Designer
- Equitable Building, Chicago
- Boots Pure Drug Co., Nottingham, England, 1968

== Gallery ==
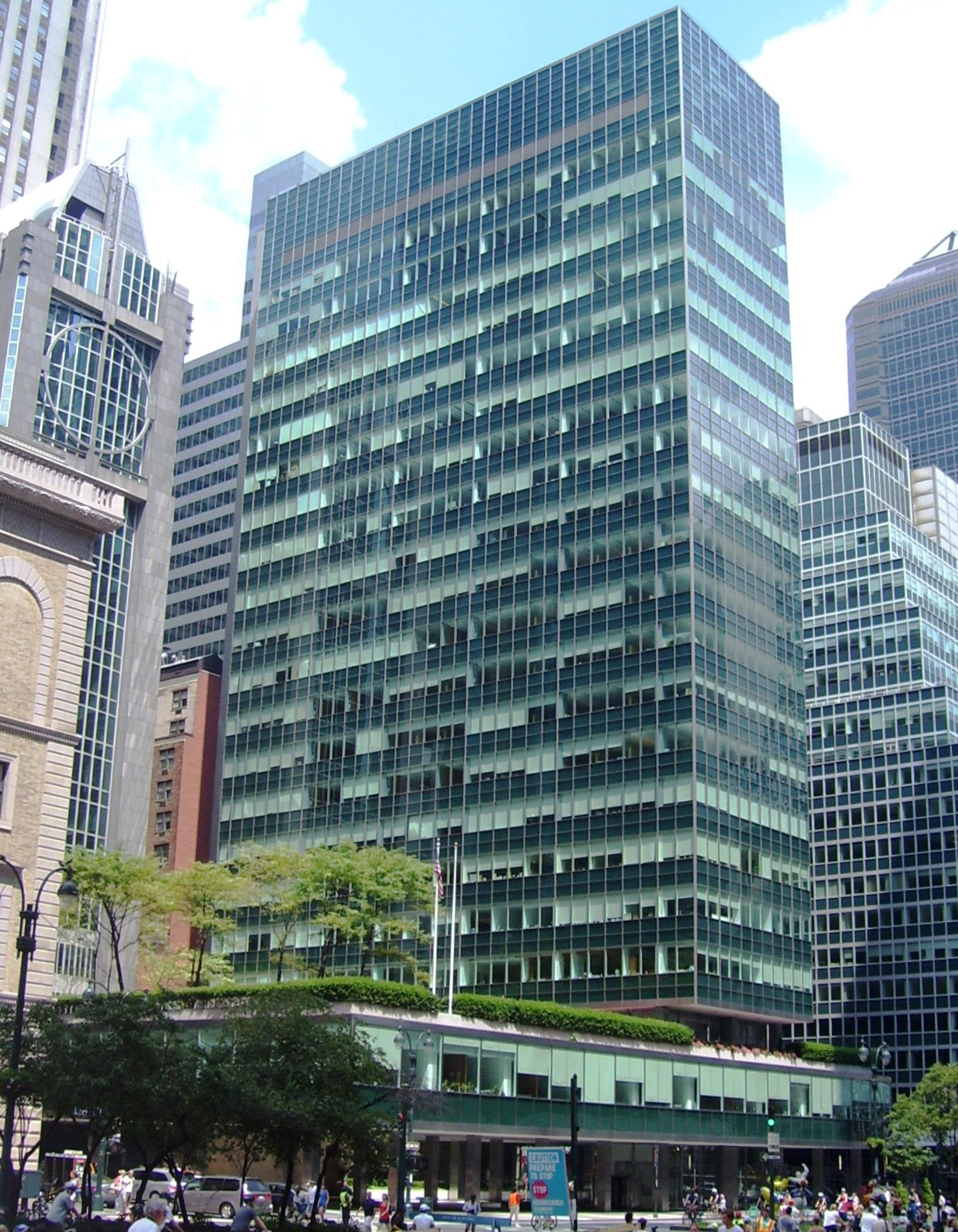
Lever House
New York, New York 1952

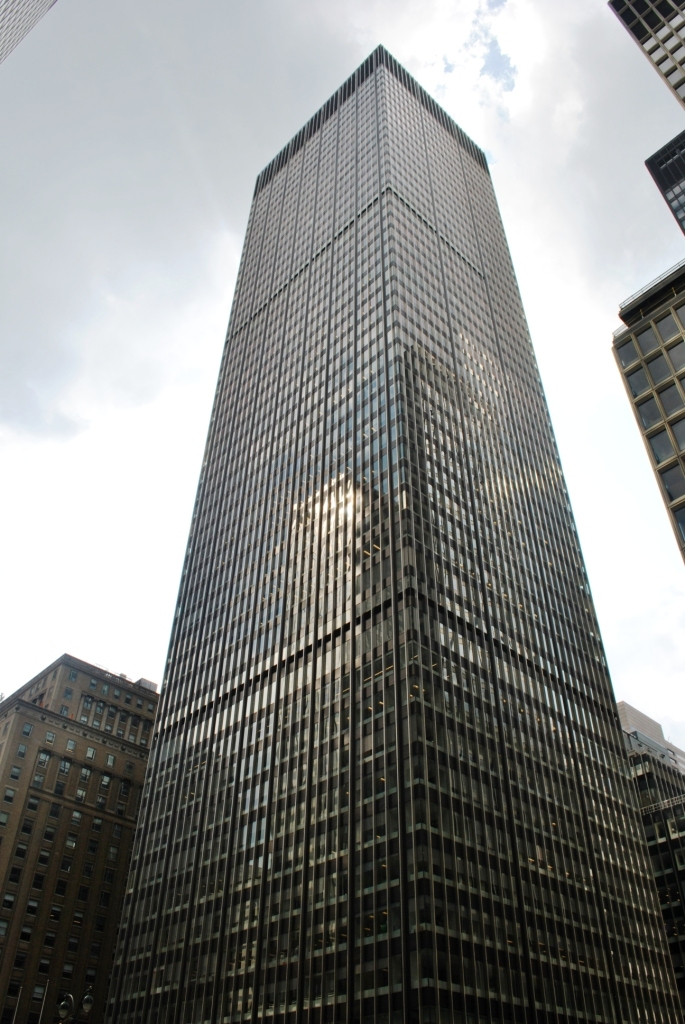
Union Carbide Building (later known as, 270 Park Avenue)
New York, New York 1954

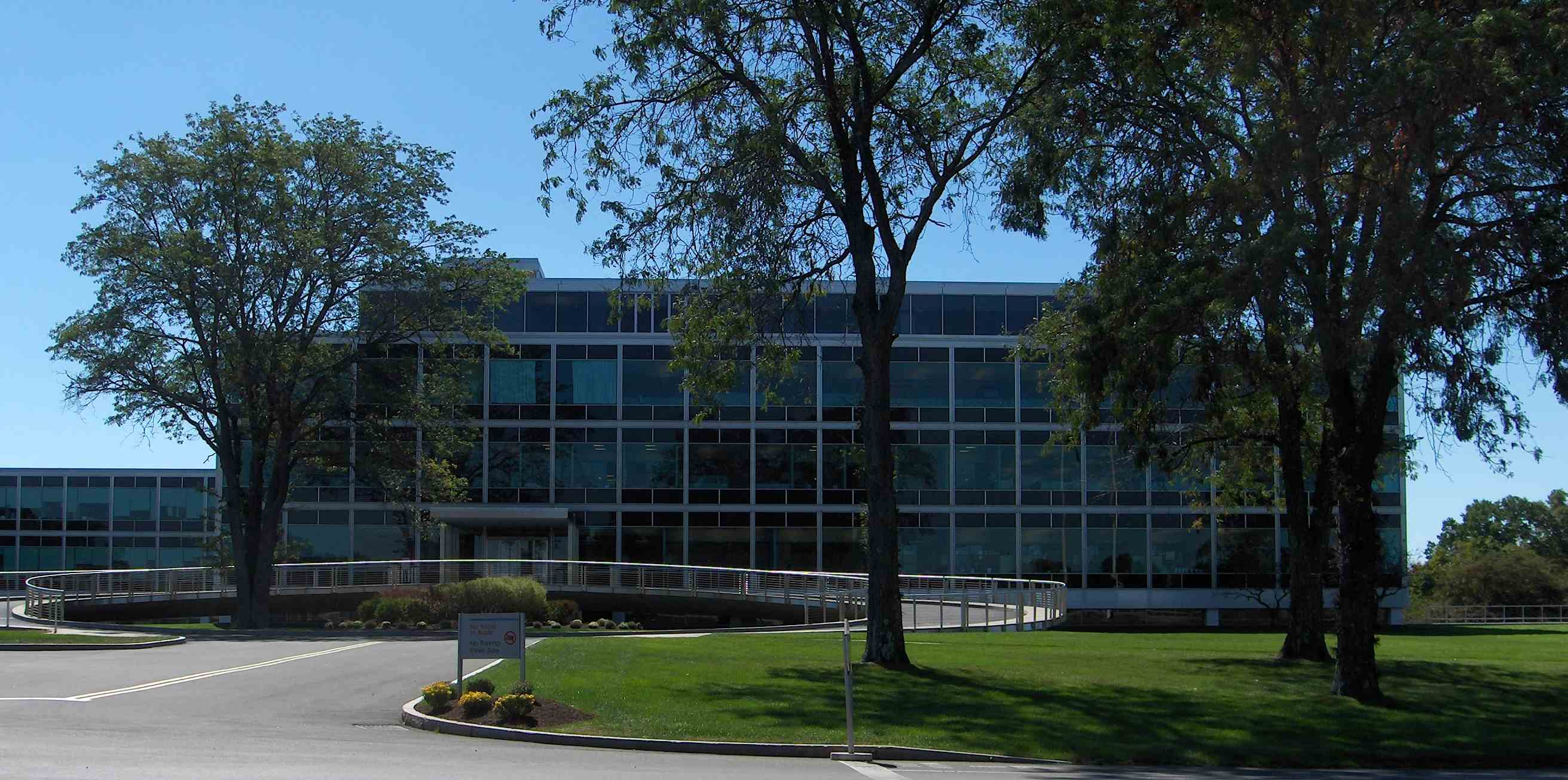
Connecticut General Life Insurance Headquarters
Bloomfield, Connecticut 1957

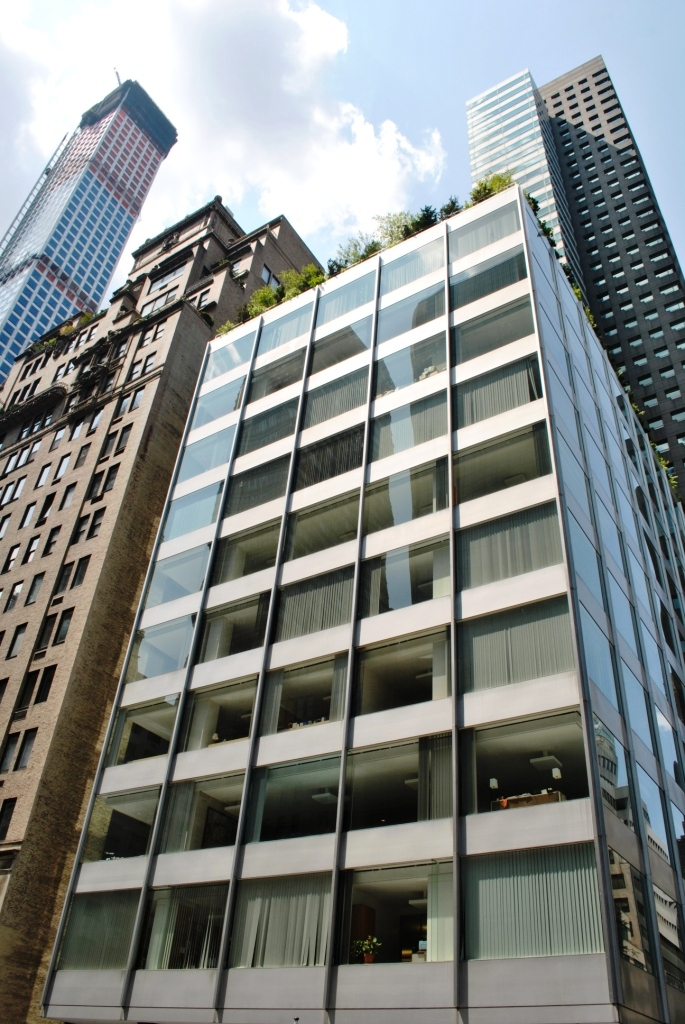
Pepsi Cola Headquarters
New York, New York 1959

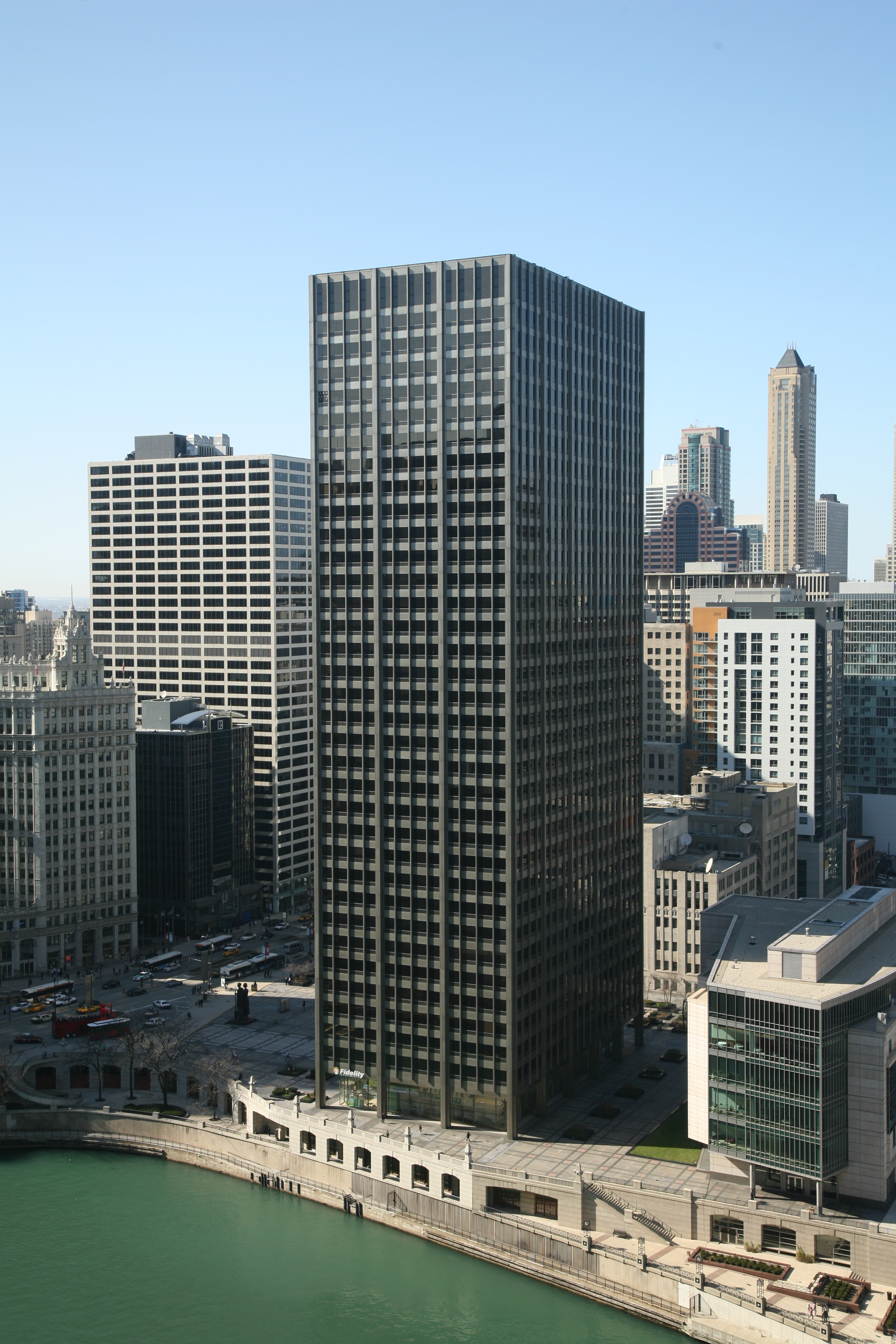
Equitable Building
Chicago, Illinois 1965

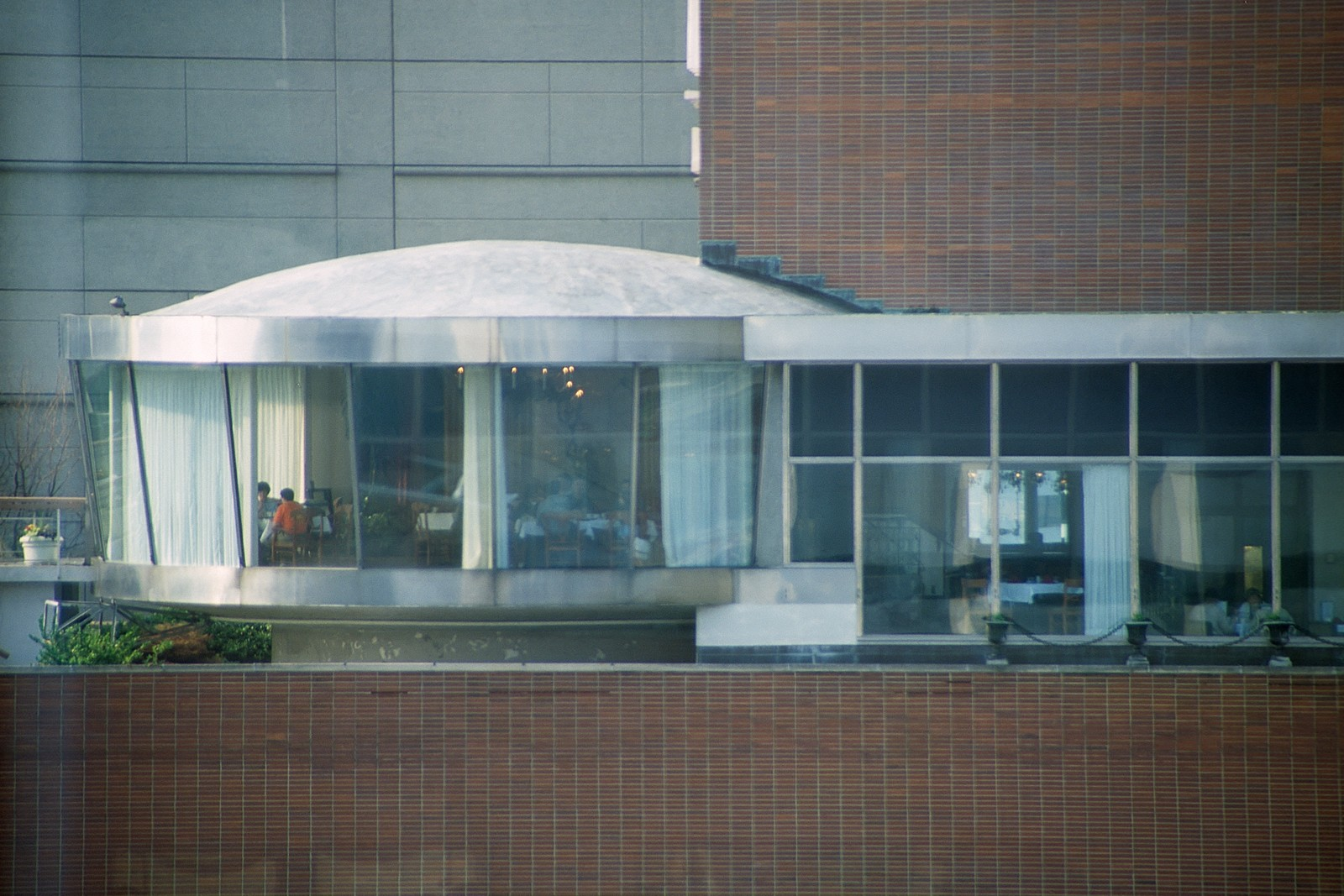
Exterior of the Gourmet Room

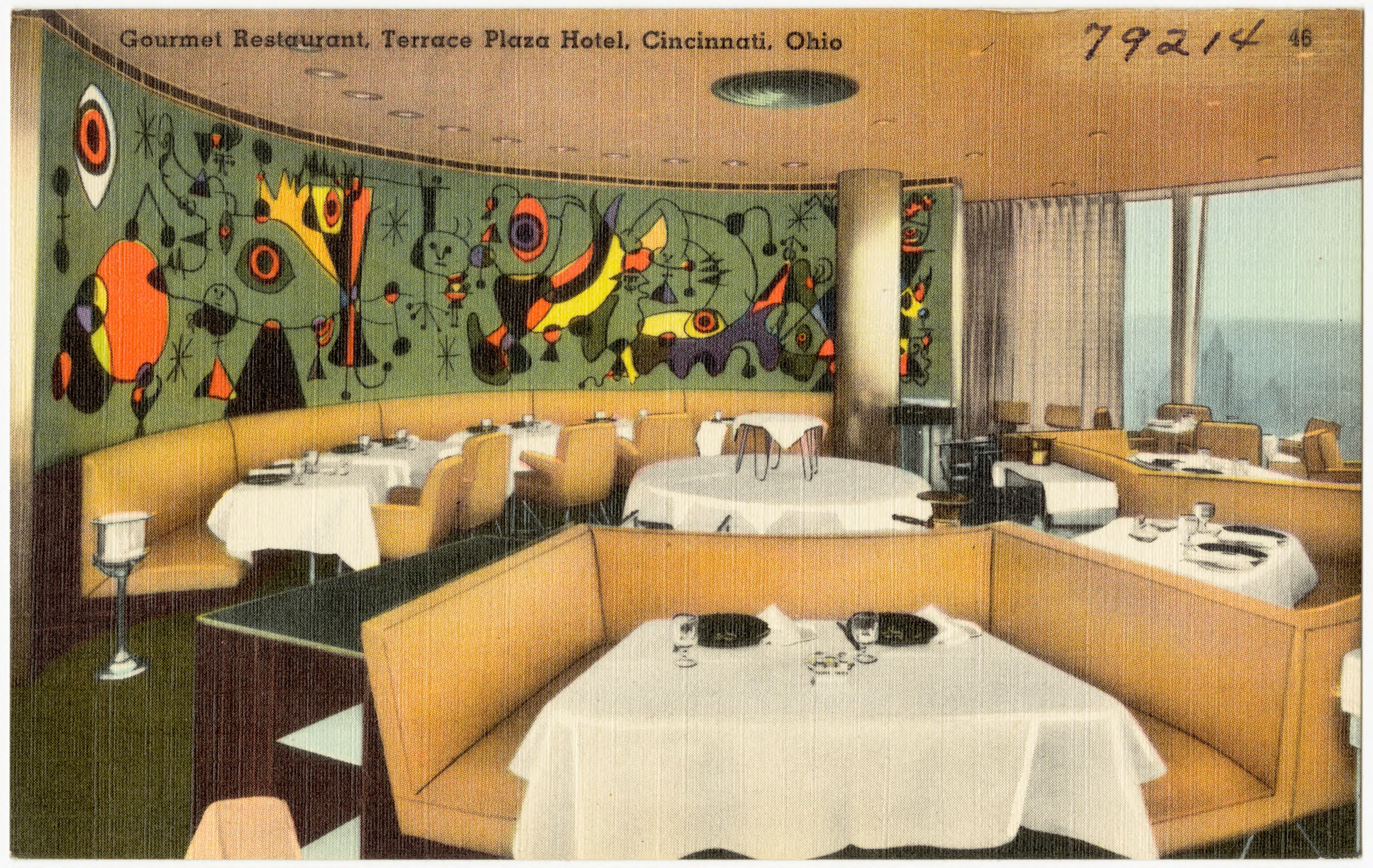
Interior of the Gourmet Room

== Awards ==
- Fulbright fellowship to study at the Ecole des Beaux-Arts, 1951–52
- Edward J. Romieniec, FAIA, Award for Outstanding Educational Contributions, recognizing an outstanding architectural educator, by the Texas Society of Architects, 1988
- Named honoree of the Natalie de Blois scholarship, UT Austin
- Fellow of the AIA (1974)

== Further research ==
- Oral history of Natalie de Blois. Interview by Betty J. Blum, Chicago Architects Oral History Project, Ernest R. Graham Study Center for Architectural Drawings, Department of Architecture, the Art Institute of Chicago.
- Susana Torre, Women in American Architecture: A Historic and Contemporary Perspective
- Natalie de Blois collection, Alexander Architectural Archives, University of Texas Libraries, The University of Texas at Austin
- AIA Historical Directory of American Architects
