= Leah Zell =

American business executive and financial analyst

Leah Joy Zell
- Born: 1949 (age 76–77); Chicago
- Education: Harvard University
- Known for: Founder and Lead Portfolio Manager of Lizard Investors LLC.

Leah Joy Zell (born 1949) is an American business executive and chartered financial analyst. She specializes in international investing in the international small-cap category. She is the Founder and Lead Portfolio Manager of Lizard Investors LLC.

== Early life and education ==
Zell was born in Chicago, Illinois, to Ruchla and Berek Zielonka, Jewish refugees who fled Poland at the onset of World War II. The family immigrated to the United States in 1941, settling in Chicago. Once in Chicago, Berek Zielonka (later known as Bernard) changed the family name to Zell. She has one sister, Julie, who was born in Poland, and one brother, Samuel Zell, an American businessman who died in 2023.

Zell attended Harvard University, graduating Magna Cum Laude and Phi Beta Kappa in 1972. She received her PhD in Modern European Social and Economic history from Harvard University in 1979, where she won Woodrow Wilson, Fulbright (DAAD), and Krupp Foundation fellowships. Zell received her CFA designation in 1987.

== Career ==
In 1979, Zell began her career at Lehman Brothers as a financial analyst.

From 1992 to 2005, Zell managed several investment portfolios at Wanger Asset Management, a firm she co‐founded with her then-husband, Ralph Wanger. While there, Zell acted as Head of International Equities and as Lead Portfolio Manager of Acorn International Fund. She left her position with the Acorn Fund in 2003.

Zell founded Lizard Investors LLC in 2008, with offices in the Tribune Tower in Chicago. The firm has since moved to the Chicago Equitable Building.

She has made various media appearances to share her expertise. These include CNBC's "Squawk Box" on August 28, 2013 to discuss emerging markets, and CNBC's "What’s Working" on May 13, 2013 to discuss international investing. Her advice also appeared in the book, A Woman's Guide to Savvy Investing by Marsha Bertrand.

Zell has been featured and/or quoted as a financial analyst on Wall Street Week and Chicago Tonight, and in various newspapers and magazines, including Australian Financial Review, Barron's, The Financial Times, Money Magazine, Business Week, Pension Management, The New York Times, The Wall Street Journal, Working Women, Smart Money, U.S. News & World Report and Investment News.

Zell is a member of the Board of Directors of the International Rescue Committee and a Trustee of the American Academy in Berlin. She is also a member of the New York Council on Foreign Relations and a Senior Fellow at Harvard's Center for European Studies. Previously, she served on the Board of Overseers of Harvard University, the Board of Trustees of the German Marshall Fund, and the Board of the Chicago Council on Global Affairs.
