= Emery Oleochemicals =

- Type: Private limited company; Joint venture
- Industry: Oleochemicals
- Founded: 1840; 186 years ago
- Headquarters: Cincinnati, Ohio, USA
- Key people: Min Chong (Group CEO)
- Parent: PTT Global Chemical (50%); SD Guthrie (50%)
- Website: www.emeryoleo.com

Emery Oleochemicals is a global oleochemical company. Emery operates production plants in the United States and Germany. It supplies products for applications in agriculture, heavy industry and consumer products. The company is a 50:50 joint venture between PTT Global Chemical of Thailand and SD Guthrie of Malaysia.

== History ==
Emery traces its origins to 1840, when Thomas Emery Sr. began converting lard discarded by meat producers in Cincinnati, Ohio, USA into candles and lamp oil.

In 1887, the Emery Candle Company was incorporated in the United States of America. From then, the company underwent expansion and diversification, most notably under the stewardship of John J. "Jack" Emery, Jr. (grandson of founder Thomas Emery) and was renamed Emery Industries. Jack Emery headed the company until 1968, and was the last of the family to run the business.

In 1978, Emery Industries was bought by National Distillers and Chemical Corp. The company was interested to complement its petrochemical branch by chemicals from renewable resources due to 1970s energy crisis.

In 1989, the business was acquired by Henkel and became part of its Chemicals Group. Henkel Chemicals Group was later renamed Cognis and was spun off by Henkel in 2001.

In 2006, Cognis transferred its global oleochemicals business to Cognis Oleochemicals, a 50:50 joint venture between Cognis and Golden Hope Plantations of Malaysia. The business's headquarters were moved to Teluk Panglima Garang (near Banting) in Malaysia. Golden Hope subsequently underwent a merger with Guthrie and Sime Darby in 2007, with the enlarged group retaining the Sime Darby name.

Cognis sold its 50% stake in the company to PTT Global Chemical in 2008. Following the exit of Cognis, the company revived the "Emery" brand name and was renamed "Emery Oleochemicals".

In September 2021, the company headquarters were moved to Cincinnati, Ohio, USA.

== Business ==
Emery is a producer of commodity and specialty chemicals made from natural oils and fats. It is one of the largest oleochemical manufacturers in the United States, along with Vantage Specialty Chemicals.

Emery's products are organized into five business units: Agro Green, Bio-Lubricants, Eco-Friendly Polyols, Green Polymer Additives, and OleoBasics.

The company's main production plants are in Cincinnati, Ohio and Loxstedt, Germany. Cincinnati and Loxstedt also house the group's technical development centers (TDCs).
