= Gourmet Room =

Landmark five-star restaurant in Cincinnati

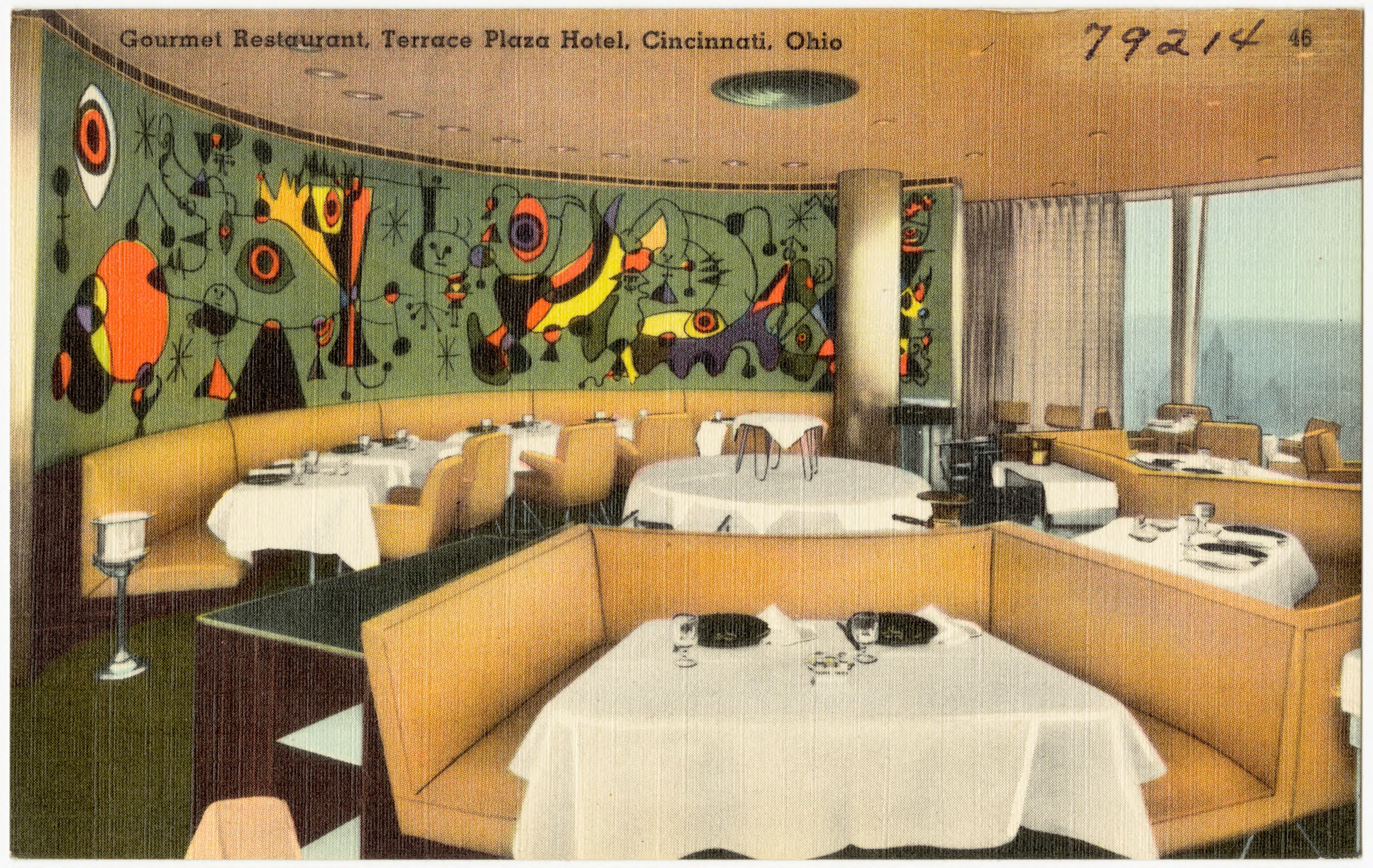
Gourmet Room and the Miró mural

The Gourmet Room or Gourmet Restaurant (1948–1992) was a fine-dining restaurant and iconic modernist space in Cincinnati, Ohio, which received five-star Mobil ratings in the 1970s and was at the time one of the few restaurants in the country so rated. It won multiple dining awards from Holiday.

== Description and art installations ==
The restaurant opened in 1948 on the rooftop of the newly-built Terrace Plaza Hotel and had 20 tables with space for 45 diners. The hotel's esthetic was mid-century modern—it was "one of the first buildings in the world with central air conditioning throughout", according to Cincinnati magazine. On the recommendation of Pierre Matisse, John J. Emery commissioned a 30 ft (9.1 m) Joan Miró mural for the restaurant. The mural dominated the dining area and was featured on the cover of the menu. Miró was chosen because his work was "very colorful and amusing, the right mood for a drinking and dining room."

The piece was Miró's first mural and his first US commission, and he installed the mural himself. The commission, according to Sotheby's, "precipitated the artist's trip to the United States in 1947". Other public areas of the hotel had installations by Alexander Calder, Jim Davis and Saul Steinberg.

== Space ==
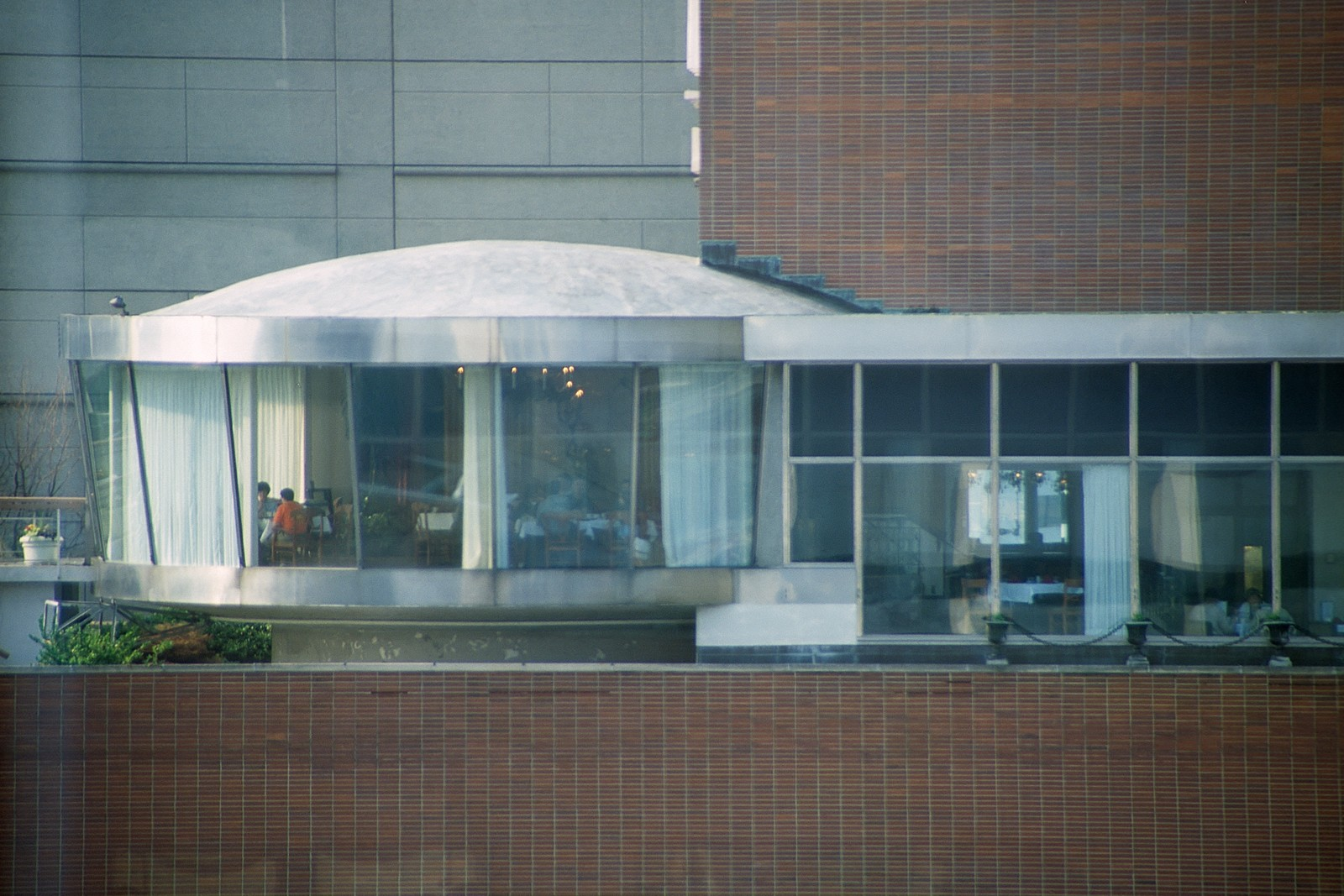
Gourmet Room exterior

The walls of the dining space that didn't hold the mural were floor-to-ceiling windows that were cantilevered to prevent a glare and provide views of the surrounding city, the skyline, and suburban areas. The restaurant was round, and the view of the restaurant from the street or nearby buildings caused it to be described as resembling a UFO which had landed on the hotel's rooftop. Ford Magazine called it "a crystal ball in the sky". Harper's Magazine wrote in 1948, "If you want to know what your grandchildren will think of as the elegance of this post-war era, you will have to go to Cincinnati and take an elevator up to the eighth floor of a pink brick building." In 2017 a building renovation plan called the restaurant space "arguably the most iconic public space" in a building that is itself considered an iconic landmark in modernist design.

The restaurant had been a late addition to the architectural plan, which was designed by Natalie de Blois. The bottom seven floors of the building were retail space, and the only elevator to the restaurant was an express from the eighth-floor hotel lobby.

== Recognition ==
In 1970 the Gourmet Room was awarded a 5th Mobil star. From the 1960s through the end of the century (and in the case of The Maisonette, until 2005) two other Cincinnati French restaurants, The Maisonette and Pigall's, also had 5 Mobil stars; the three at one point were among only 8 Mobil 5-star restaurants in the United States, and with the addition of the Gourmet Room Cincinnati had more than New York City. The cuisine at The Gourmet Room was nouvelle rather than haute cuisine (such as served at The Maisonette) or French provincial (Pigall's), and it wasn't unusual for dining enthusiasts to fly into Cincinnati from Chicago or New York for a three-night stay and eat at all three restaurants. By the mid-1970s the restaurant had lost its fifth Mobil star.

== Decline ==
The hotel, including the restaurant, was sold to Hilton, who renamed it the Terrace Hilton. In 1992 the restaurant and hotel were closed. At Emery's request the Miró mural, as well as the Calder and Steinberg pieces, were donated and moved to the Cincinnati Art Museum; the Miró was installed in the museum's dining room. Emery had also requested the Davis light sculptures be donated, but those were lost between the time of the original sale to Hilton and the period in which Hilton redecorated.

== Preservation efforts ==
In 2020 the Terrace Plaza was designated by the National Trust for Historic Preservation as one of the 11 most endangered historic sites in the country. In September 2022 the hotel was sold to Indiana developer Anthony Birkla for $10 million. The buyer planned to reinvest in the Gourmet Room space, working with a local restaurateur and a local architectural design studio.

== Chefs ==
- Vito Lacaputo
- George Pulver
- John Kinsella
- Hans Panchup
