= Terrace Plaza Hotel =

Building in Cincinnati, Ohio

- U.S. National Register of Historic Places
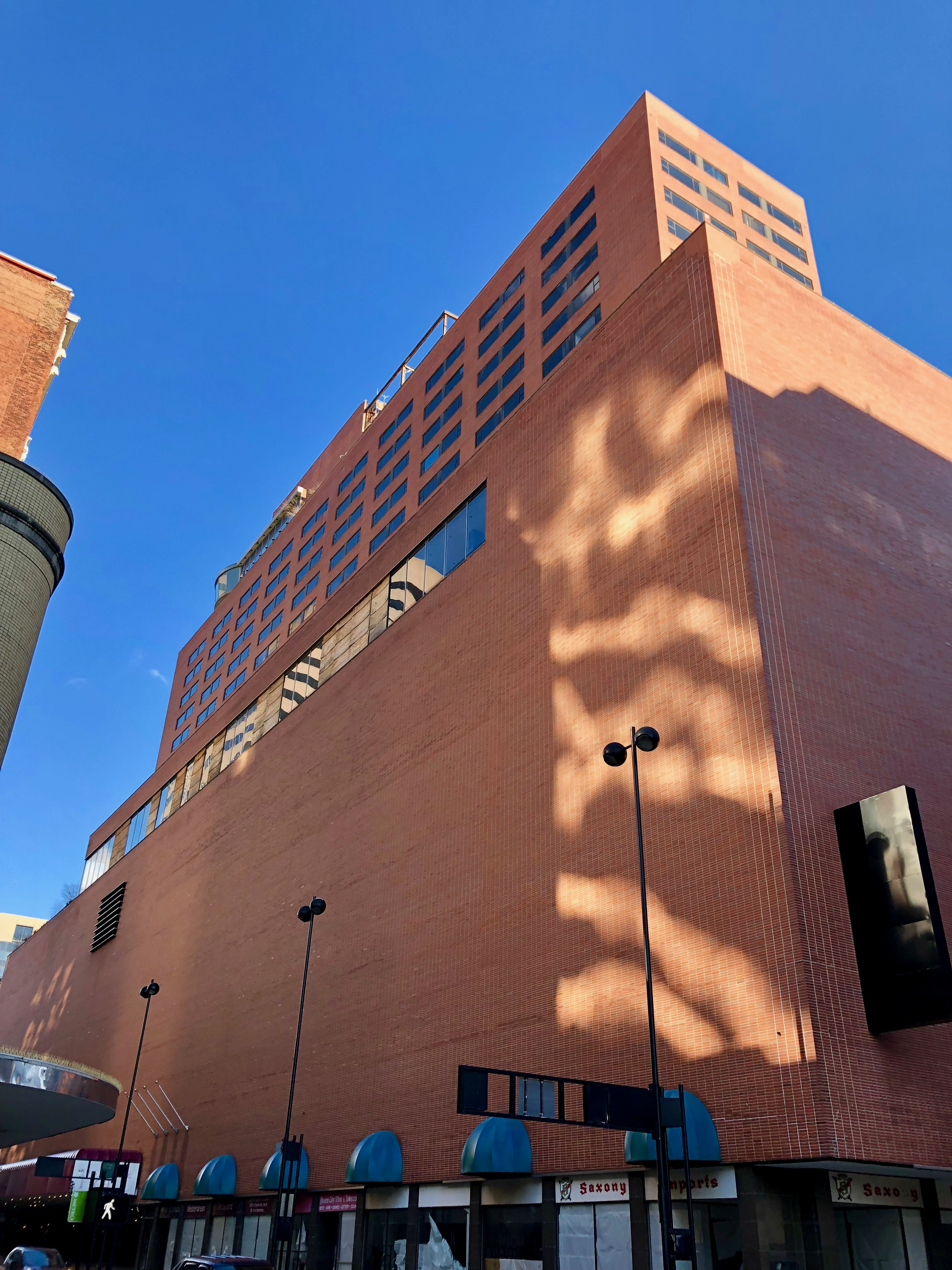
- The building in 2019
- Coordinates: 39°06′07.6″N 84°30′50.5″W
- Architect: Skidmore, Owings & Merrill
- NRHP reference No.: 100001493
- Added to NRHP: August 24, 2017

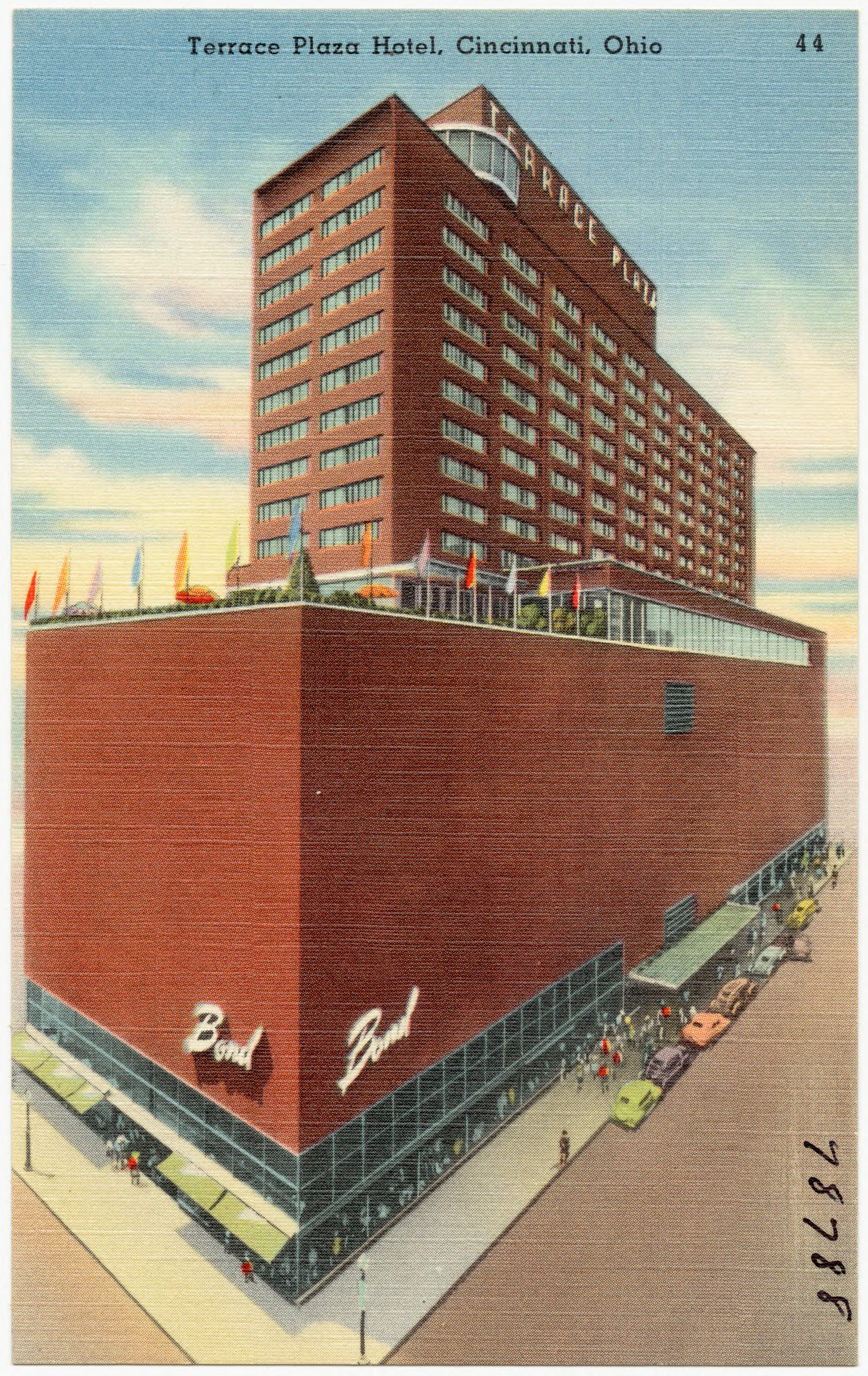
Postcard of the hotel

The Terrace Plaza Hotel is an 18-story International Style mixed-use building completed in 1948 in downtown Cincinnati, Ohio, U.S. It sits at 15 Sixth St West between Vine and Race Streets.

The bottom seven floors, which have no exterior windows, have previously been home to retail outlets and a call center, while the top 11 floors were used as a hotel. The building has been completely vacant since the hotel's closure in 2008. Several iterations of redevelopment plans have been presented over the years since, and interior demolition work began in 2024.

== History ==
=== Initial design ===
The building was developed by Cincinnati industrialist John J. Emery, who also constructed the nearby Carew Tower/Netherland Plaza Hotel mixed-use complex.

Designed by the architecture firm of Skidmore, Owings & Merrill between 1946 and 1948, the Terrace Plaza Hotel was their first hotel project and one of the first high-rise projects to be constructed in the United States after World War II. SOM went on to design some of the world's tallest and most iconic buildings.

SOM founder Louis Skidmore and architect William Brown created the building's initial designs. Because so many men had been drafted for service in World War II, SOM assigned 24-year-old Natalie de Blois to be the senior designer, making the Terrace Plaza one of the first hotels in America to be designed primarily by a woman. Her team planned details down to furniture and matchbook covers.

=== Opening ===
The hotel opened on July 19, 1948. The building was considered groundbreaking for its modernism when it opened. Harper's Magazine published "If you want to discover what your grandchildren will think of as elegance of this postwar era, you will have to go to Cincinnati." In addition to being the first hotel after WWII, it was also the first to have self-operated elevators and individual thermostats in rooms.

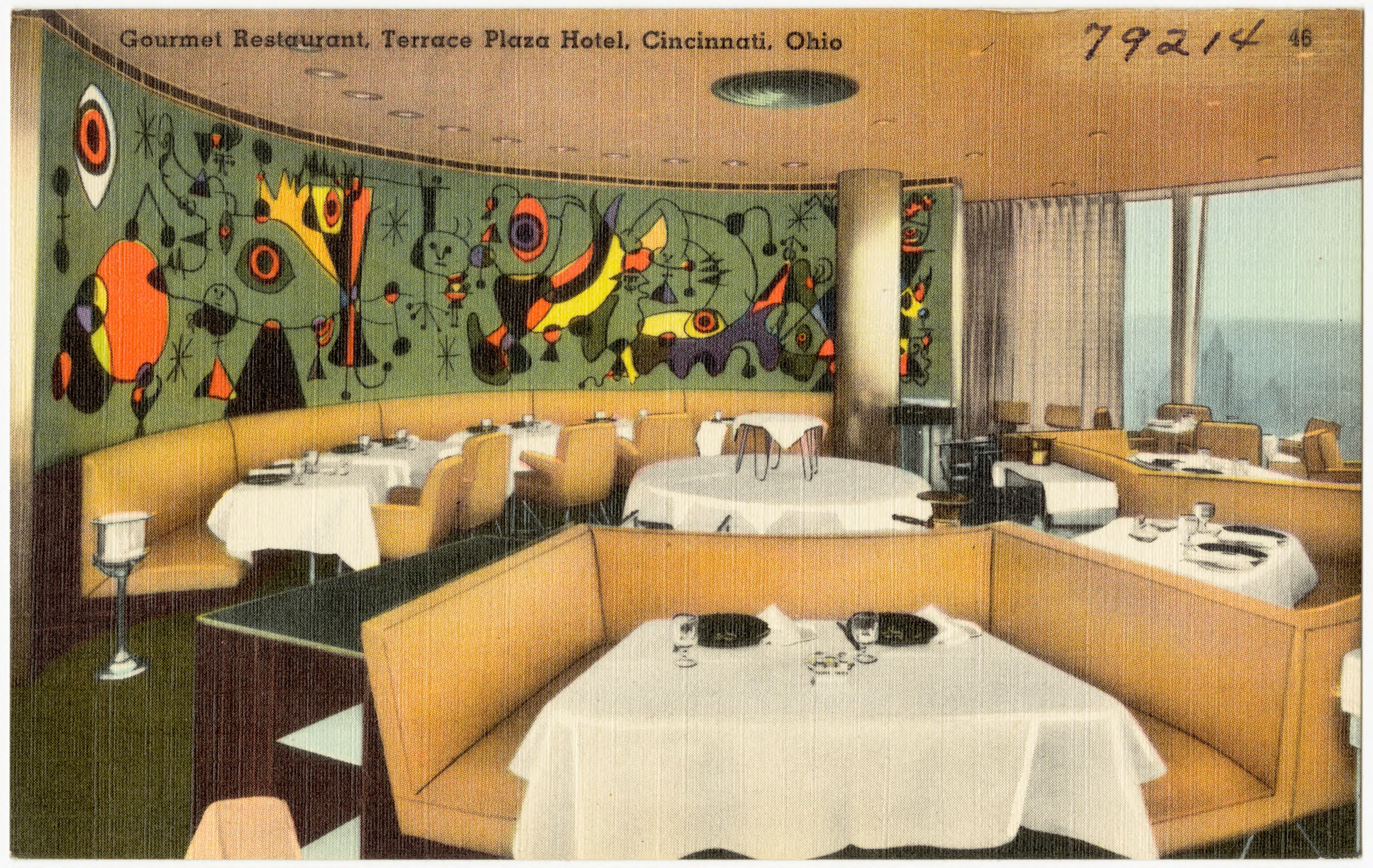
Gourmet Room with Miro mural

The 600,000 sq ft building originally housed a J.C. Penney department store and a Bond clothing store in a windowless lower block style portion of the building. Above the stores on the first seven floors, the hotel lobby on the 8th floor was accessed via high speed elevators. The hotel tower rose above the stores in a very different style. A 5-star French restaurant with wall to wall windows sat above the hotel. The 8th floor plaza even hosted ice skating in the winter. Inside, the decor was accented with modern art, including an abstract mural by Joan Miró in the hotel's iconic Gourmet Room rooftop restaurant, another mural showing Cincinnati landmarks by Saul Steinberg and works by Alexander Calder and Jim Davis.

=== Ownership changes and closure ===
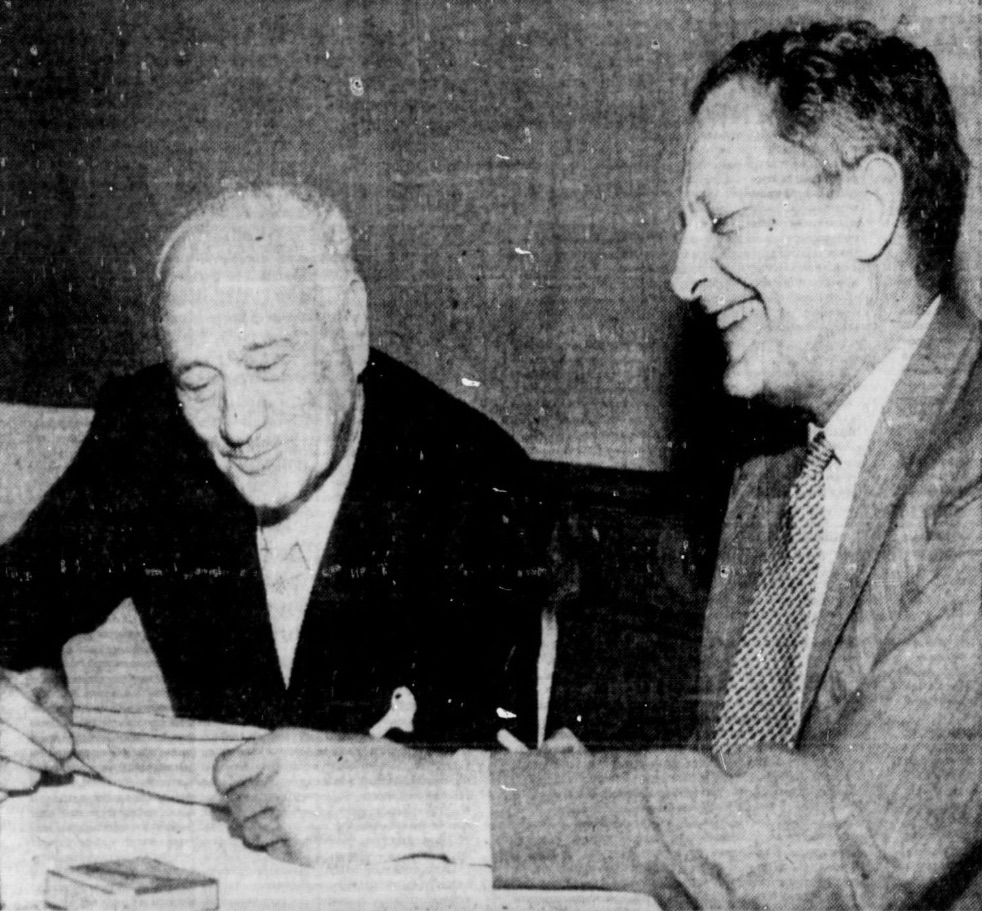
Conrad Hilton (left) hands John J. Emery a check for the 1956 sale

Emery sold the structure to Hilton Hotels on November 1, 1956 and the hotel was renamed The Terrace Hilton. When the hotel was sold, Emery transferred its modern art collection to the nearby Cincinnati Art Museum. The J.C. Penney store closed in 1968, while the Bond store closed in 1977. AT&T bought the building in 1983, converting the windowless second through seventh stories to a call center. AT&T sold the structure to Oliveye Retail Limited Partnership, a group that included developers Emanuel "Manny" Organek and Marc Blumberg. The new owners switched the management of the hotel from Hilton to Crowne Plaza and the hotel became the Crowne Plaza Cincinnati. A massive redevelopment was announced in 2004. The lower levels were to have their brick facade stripped and replaced with glass curtain walls. The lower portion would contain two stories of retail, three stories of offices, and two stories of apartments. The hotel tower would become a boutique hotel, known as the Next, while the top levels of the hotel would be converted to penthouse apartments. The plans did not materialize, and the structure was sold to Sixth Street Cincinnati Association LLC in 2006. The Crowne Plaza Cincinnati closed on October 31, 2008.

=== Redevelopment plans ===
The structure was listed on the National Register of Historic Places in 2017. In 2020, the National Trust for Historic Preservation named it as one of America's most endangered historic places. The building is currently mostly vacant, with some business still occupying street-level retail properties. Steps have been taken in recent years to prepare the building for preservation. However, it was denied landmark status by the Cincinnati City Council in May 2022, after the Cincinnati Planning Commission said that landmarking the building would place restrictions on it that would make any redevelopment prohibitively expensive. In June 2022, it was reported that the structure was being marketed for sale at auction as part of bankruptcy proceedings.

In September 2022 the hotel was sold to Indiana developer Anthony Birkla for $10 million. In 2024, the soft walls of the building were demolished and asbestos abatement was performed by Green City Demolition, this will allow the steel skeleton of the building to be used in redevelopment. The new owners plan to convert it to a mix of residential and retail use, known as The Terraces.

== See also ==
- National Register of Historic Places listings in downtown Cincinnati
