= John J. Emery =

American real estate developer (1898–1976)

Jack Emery
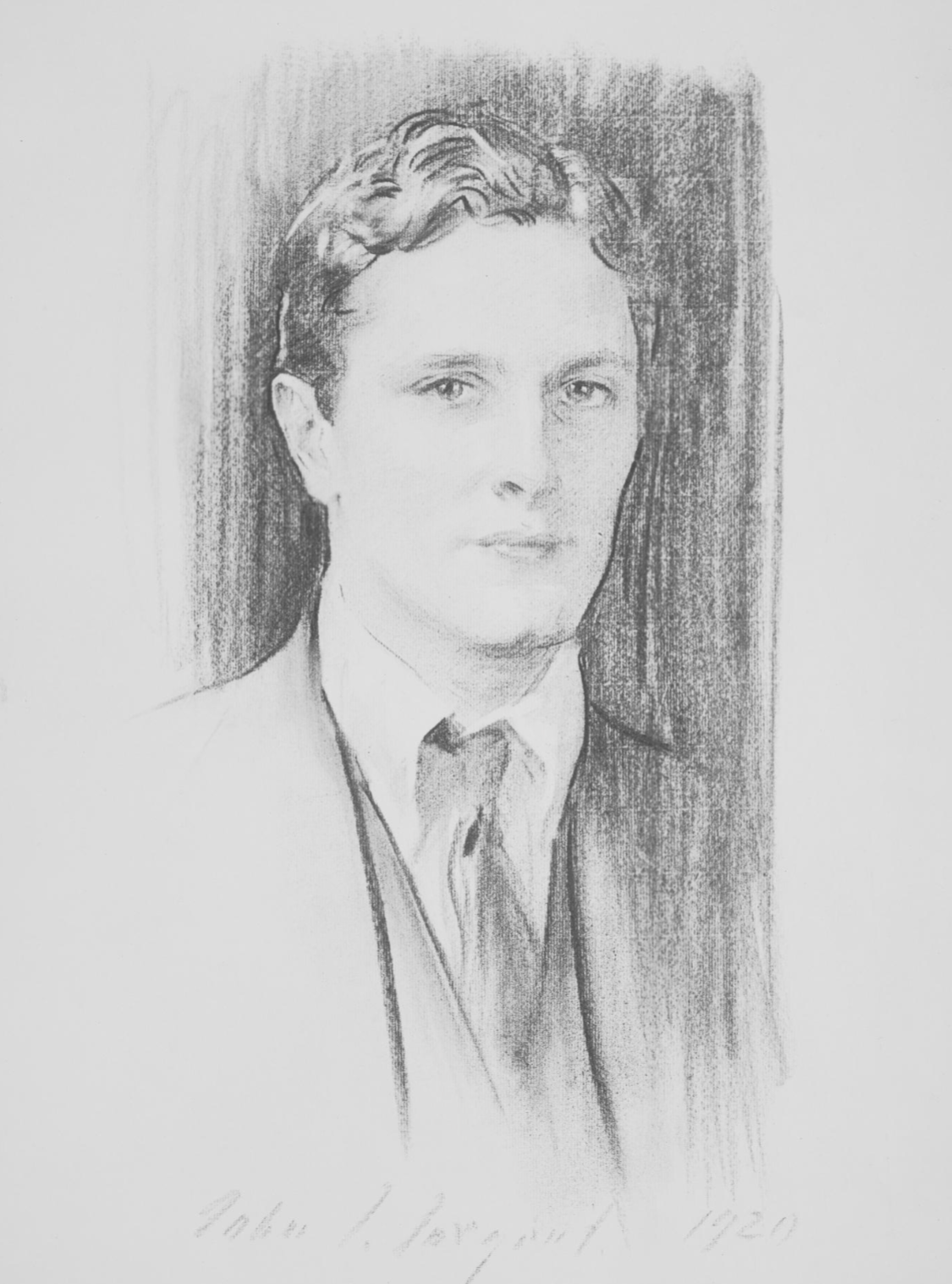
- Portrait by John Singer Sargent
- Born: John Josiah Emery Jr. January 28, 1898; New York City, New York, U.S.
- Died: September 24, 1976 (aged 78); Indian Hill, Ohio, U.S.
- Education: Groton School; Harvard University; Harvard Law School; Trinity College, Oxford
- Occupation: Real estate developer
- Spouses: Irene Langhorne Gibson (m. 1926; died 1973) Adele H. Olyphant (m. 1975)
- Children: 4
- Parent(s): John Josiah Emery Sr. Lela Alexander Emery
- Relatives: Audrey Emery (sister); Paul Ilyinsky (nephew); Mary Emery (aunt)

John Josiah Emery Jr. (January 28, 1898 — September 24, 1976) was an American real estate developer including of the Carew Tower (1931) in Cincinnati, Ohio, at the time the tallest building west of the Alleghenies, and the Netherland Plaza Hotel, opened at the same time. He was a major figure in the city's cultural life for more than four decades.

== Early life ==
Jack Emery was born in New York City on January 28, 1898. He was the son of John Josiah Emery Sr. (1835–1908), a real-estate millionaire, and Lela (née Alexander) Emery (1867–1953), daughter of General Charles T. Alexander, of Washington. Among his siblings was Audrey Emery, who married the impecunious Grand Duke Dmitri Pavlovich of Russia; Lela Emery, who married first Capt. Alastair Mackintosh (second husband of Constance Talmadge) and secondly Hély, the Marquis de Talleyrand; and Alexandra, who married Benjamin Moore and Robert Gordon McKay. His paternal grandfather was Thomas Emery, who was born in Bedford, England and settled in Cincinnati in 1832. His maternal grandparents were General Charles Tripler Alexander and Julia (née Barrett) Alexander of St. Paul, Minnesota and Bar Harbor, Maine.

He was raised on the East Coast and in Europe, after his mother married, as her second husband, the Hon. Alfred Anson, a British stockbroker living in New York City, in 1912. Anson was the seventh son of Thomas Anson, 2nd Earl of Lichfield and Lady Harriett Georgiana Hamilton (the eldest daughter of James Hamilton, 1st Duke of Abercorn). As a child and young man, his family moved each year between their houses in New York City (5 East 68th Street), Bar Harbor, Maine (The Turrets, now owned by The College of the Atlantic), Palm Beach (where his mother owned several houses) and Paris and Biarritz, France (where his mother owned a large house, later converted into a school).

Emery prepared at Groton for Harvard, where his education was interrupted by World War I when he served as an ensign in Naval Aviation. After he returned from War, he received his BA degree, cum laude, in 1920. He spent one year at Harvard Law School and then went to Trinity College, Oxford, where received a diploma in Economics in 1922.

== Career ==
His grandfather founded a lard oil and candle business in 1840, known as Emery Candle Company, that his father developed into the Emery Chemical Company, later known as Emery Industries. His grandfather had also assembled sizable real estate holdings in the center of Cincinnati, which was enlarged by Emery's father.

In 1924, Emery, who was planning on going into the publishing business with Cass Canfield, returned to Cincinnati on a visit and stayed to manage what he perceived to be the faltering family business. He proceeded to consolidate the family's real estate holdings into several blocks in downtown Cincinnati. The real estate company, Thomas Emery's Sons, built the first substantial apartment houses in Cincinnati as well as numerous other buildings downtown (Mercantile Library Building, The Cincinnatian Hotel and others) and in the immediately adjacent hills.

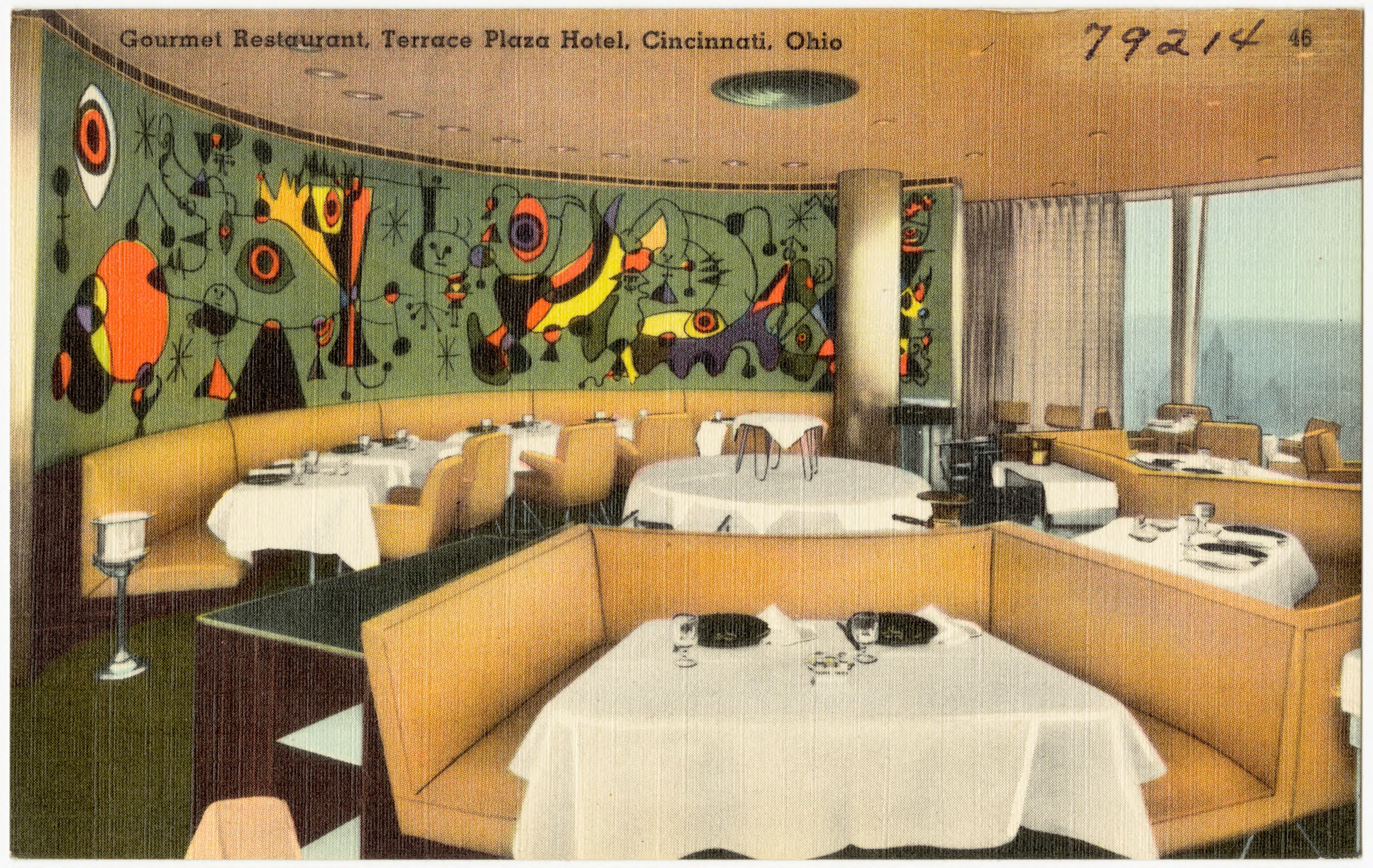
Gourmet Room at the Terrace Plaza Hotel, with mural commissioned from Miro

After World War II, Thomas Emery's Sons built the Terrace Plaza Hotel, designed by Skidmore, Owings and Merrill, placing the hotel lobby on the eighth floor, reached by elevators that by-passed the commercial floors. For the hotel he commissioned three works of art that passed to the Cincinnati Art Museum when he sold the Terrace Plaza: a mural by Joan Miró commissioned for the hotel's Gourmet Room, a cartoon mural by Saul Steinberg and a giant mobile by Alexander Calder.

He was a founder of the Cincinnati Country Day School, a leading trustee and important benefactor of the Cincinnati Art Museum. He served as vice-president of the Boy Scouts of America in the Cincinnati area, and was an original member of the Cincinnati Public Recreation Commission. He was a trustee of the Children's Symphony Orchestra, Cincinnati Summer Opera, the Conservatory of Music and the Taft Museum of Art, as well as a trustee of the National Cultural Center in Washington, D.C.

== Personal life ==
In 1926, he married Irene Langhorne (née Gibson) Post (1897–1973). Irene was the daughter of the celebrated illustrator Charles Dana Gibson and the niece of Lady Astor, the first woman elected to the British Parliament. Irene was the mother of George B. Post IV and Nancy Langhorne Post from her first marriage to George B. Post III (grandson of the architect George B. Post). Together, John and Irene were the parents of four children, all born in Cincinnati:

- Irene Emery (1927–2017), who married painter Robert Perkins Goodale at the Académie Julian art school in Paris, in 1946.
- Lela Emery (1929–2006), who married John F. Steele (1924–2020) in 1967.
- Melissa Emery (1933–1999), who married Lloyd Addison Lanier (1924–2002) in 1953.
- Ethan Emery (1937-2021), a 1959 graduate of Harvard who married Liliane Solmsen in 1962.

After his first wife's death in 1973, he remarried to widow Adele Sloane (née Hammond) Olyphant (1902–1998) on December 3, 1975. Adele, a member of the Vanderbilt family, was the sister of record producer John Hammond, the daughter of Emily Vanderbilt Sloane, a granddaughter of Emily Thorn Vanderbilt and William Douglas Sloane, and a great-granddaughter of William Henry Vanderbilt. Adele was also the grandmother of actor Timothy Olyphant.

Emery died on September 24, 1976, and is buried at the Indian Hill Church near Cincinnati.

=== Residences ===
Emery and his family spent summers in Dark Harbor, Maine on Seven Hundred Acre Island, where his father-in-law, Charles Dana Gibson, had built a house beginning in 1904. During those summers, the children were tutored in preparation for school, including daughter Lela who prior to leaving home for the Foxcroft School in 1944 was tutored by Connie Frazer at their homes at Peterloon and on Seven Hundred Acre Island.

In 1929, he began constructing his 1,200-acre (4.9 km^{2}) estate, Peterloon immediately north of Indian Hill, then a rural outer suburb of Cincinnati to which some affluent citizens of Cincinnati, Ohio were moving in search of a country life-style. Indian Hill of the 1930s revolved around the Camargo Club and the Camargo Hunt. Since his death, much of Peterloon has been divided into housing lots, leaving the neo-Georgian brick house on 72 acres (290,000 m^{2}) as an event destination owned by The Peterloon Foundation. The house was designed by Delano and Aldrich of New York, who also designed a five-bedroom stucco cottage nearby, in which the Emery family could live while the Peterloon house was being built.

=== Awards and honors ===
Emery was the recipient of the "Great Living Cincinnatian" award from The Cincinnati Chamber of Commerce; the William Booth Award from the Salvation Army; the "President's Award for Excellence" from the University of Cincinnati. He also received an honorary Doctor of Music degree from the Cincinnati Conservatory of Music and a Doctor of Humane Letters from the University of Cincinnati.
