= 500 Park Avenue =

Mixed-use building in Manhattan, New York

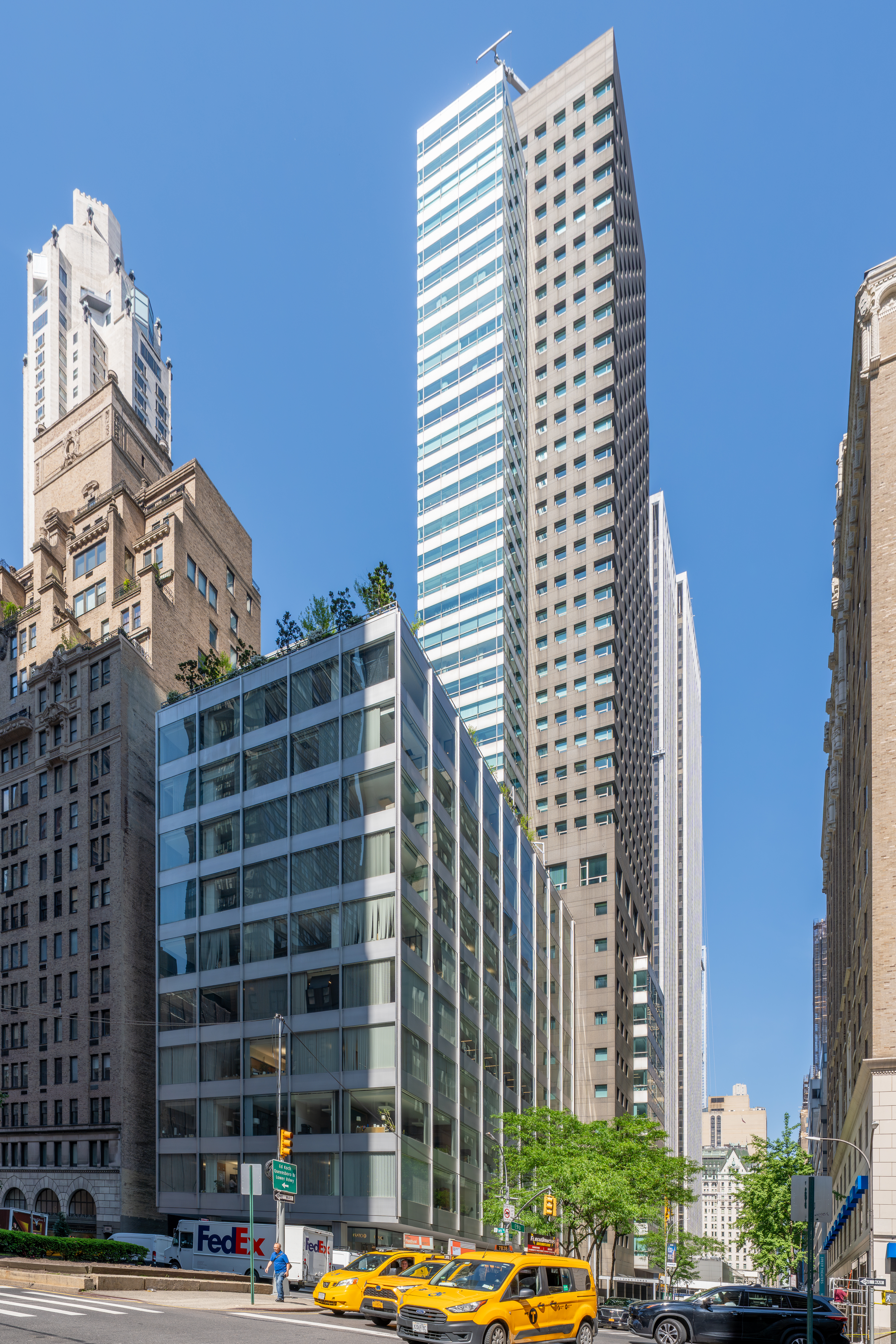
- 500 Park Avenue as seen from across Park Avenue in 2026
- Alternative names: Pepsi-Cola Building; Olivetti Building; ABN-Amro Bank Building

General information
- Type: Office
- Architectural style: International Style
- Location: Manhattan, New York
- Coordinates: 40°45′47″N 73°58′14″W
- Construction started: 1958
- Completed: 1960
- Opened: February 1, 1960
- Renovated: 1981–1984
- Cost: $7.8 million (equivalent to $63,186,000 in 2024)
- Client: Pepsi-Cola Company
- Owner: SL Green (original building); Condominium owners (residential tower)

Height
- Height: 466 ft (142 m)

Technical details
- Floor count: 40

Design and construction
- Architects: Gordon Bunshaft; Natalie de Blois; both of: Skidmore, Owings and Merrill

Renovating team
- Architects: James Stewart Polshek & Partners; Schuman, Lichtenstein, Claman & Efron

New York City Landmark
- Designated: June 20, 1995
- Reference no.: 1920
- Designated entity: Original Pepsi-Cola Building

500 Park Avenue is an office and residential condominium building on the southwest corner of Park Avenue and 59th Street in the Midtown Manhattan neighborhood of New York City, composed of the 11-story Pepsi-Cola Building and the 40-story 500 Park Tower. The original Pepsi-Cola Building along Park Avenue was constructed from 1958 to 1960 and designed by Gordon Bunshaft and Natalie de Blois of Skidmore, Owings and Merrill (SOM). The tower along 59th Street was constructed between 1981 and 1984 to designs by James Stewart Polshek & Partners.

The old Pepsi-Cola Building was designed in the International Style with a curtain wall made of glass and aluminum. The second through tenth stories slightly overhang a plaza at ground level, while the eleventh floor contained a company penthouse. Inside, the original building's lobby was initially used as an exhibition space, while the upper stories contained offices. 500 Park Tower contains a facade made of thermal black granite, as well as glass and aluminum. Inside 500 Park Tower, the first eleven floors contain office space that extends into the original building, while the upper floors contain 56 residential condominiums.

The original structure was the headquarters of the Pepsi-Cola Company from its construction until 1967 and was initially owned by the John Hancock Mutual Insurance Company. It then served as the headquarters of Olivetti S.p.A. until 1978, when it was successively resold to Peter Kalikow, Securities Groups, and then the Equitable Life Assurance Society. The original building was occupied by the Amsterdam and Rotterdam Bank (later ABN AMRO) starting in 1982, and 500 Park Tower was concurrently developed to the west. In 1995, the New York City Landmarks Preservation Commission designated the Pepsi-Cola Building as a New York City landmark. Other companies such as The Walt Disney Company have taken space in the building since the 1990s. SL Green bought the original portion of 500 Park Avenue in 2024.

== Site ==
500 Park Avenue is at the southwest corner of Park Avenue and 59th Street in the Midtown Manhattan neighborhood of New York City. The building is composed of two land lots. The rectangular land lot under the original building, at the street corner proper, has a frontage of 100 feet (30 m) on Park Avenue to the east and 125 feet (38 m) on 59th Street to the north. The rectangular lot to the west has a frontage of 75 feet (23 m) on 59th Street and a depth of 100 feet. 500 Park Avenue is near the Fuller Building and Four Seasons Hotel New York to the southwest; 59E59 Theaters and Trump Park Avenue to the north; 499 Park Avenue to the east; and the Ritz Tower to the southeast.

Through the 1880s, the surrounding area of Park Avenue had been mostly undeveloped, but by the 1900s, the site contained six-to-eight-story residences, as well as a nine-story New York City Board of Education building at the address 500 Park Avenue. In the late 19th century, the Park Avenue railroad line ran in an open cut in the middle of Park Avenue. The line was covered with the construction of Grand Central Terminal in the early 20th century, spurring development in the surrounding area, Terminal City. The adjacent stretch of Park Avenue became a wealthy neighborhood with upscale apartments. The Board of Education building, designed by Napoleon LeBrun, was occupied by its namesake from the early 1890s to 1940. Afterward, it was used by various government functions, such as the Civilian Defense Recruitment, the Youth Board, and the Mayor's Reception Committee.

Many of the residential structures on Park Avenue were replaced with largely commercial International Style skyscrapers in the 1950s and 1960s. These structures included 270 Park Avenue, Lever House, 425 Park Avenue, and the Seagram Building, all of which are south of the Pepsi-Cola site.

== Architecture ==
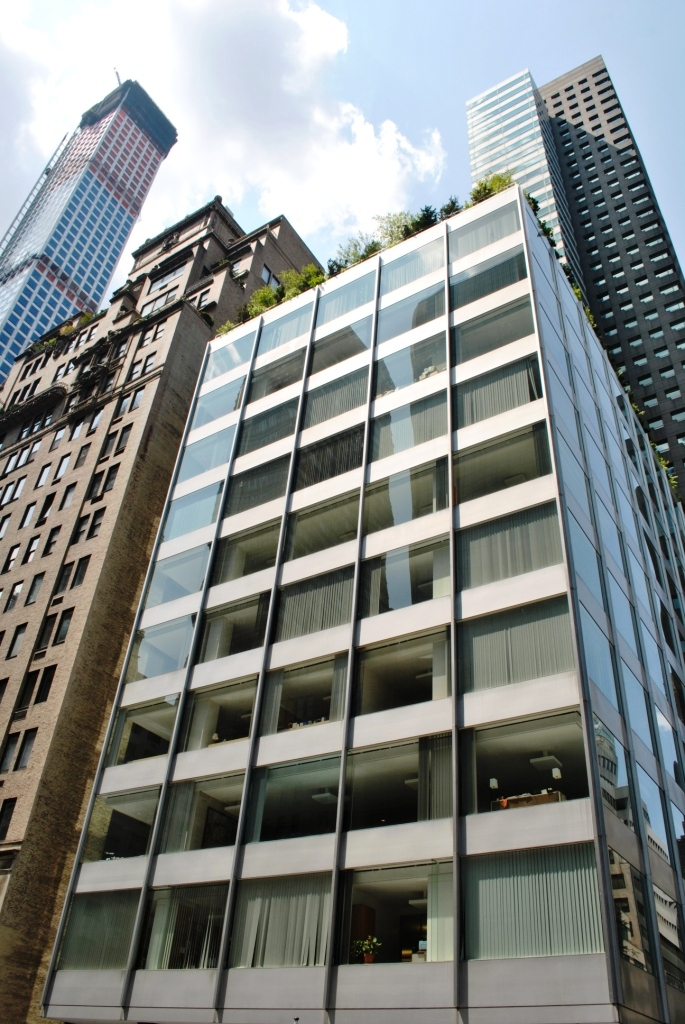
Original building

The original 11-story structure at the corner of Park Avenue and 59th Street was designed by Gordon Bunshaft and Natalie de Blois of Skidmore, Owings and Merrill (SOM), with de Blois as main designer. The original structure was built as the headquarters of the Pepsi-Cola Company and was formerly known as the Pepsi-Cola Building, Olivetti Building, and ABM-Amro Bank Building. 500 Park Tower along 59th Street was designed by Ennead Architects (then known as James Stewart Polshek & Partners). The tower is 466 feet (142 m) tall and is alternately described as containing 40 stories or 41 stories.

=== Original building ===
The original building is eleven stories tall and largely retains its initial configuration, with a facade designed as a glass curtain wall. Pepsi had small office requirements, similar to the tenants of Lever House and the Manufacturers Trust Company Building, both of which SOM had previously designed. The base is set several feet behind the upper stories to give the impression that the office stories were a tower. According to de Blois, she had come up with the concept of the Pepsi-Cola Building as a glass box, while Bunshaft was responsible for arranging the structural columns to create this effect. It was designed under the 1916 Zoning Resolution and constructed just before the zoning regulations were changed. In practice, the original building was designed as a "base without a tower", as described by architectural writer Robert A. M. Stern. The original building's low height allowed SOM to avoid using overscaled design features and to use as few design components as possible.

The original structure is surrounded by a plaza with granite pavement, which reaches the curb on both Park Avenue and 59th Street. The plaza is at sidewalk level on Park Avenue and is four steps higher than the western end of the site on 59th Street, giving the impression that the plaza is a podium. The plaza's pavement dates from the 1980s when 500 Park Tower was built. The granite plaza extends in front of 500 Park Tower. The eastern end of the plaza contains a stainless steel cube. At the western end of the plaza is a flagpole atop a granite bulkhead, as well as a metal canopy extending to the 59th Street sidewalk.

==== Facade ====
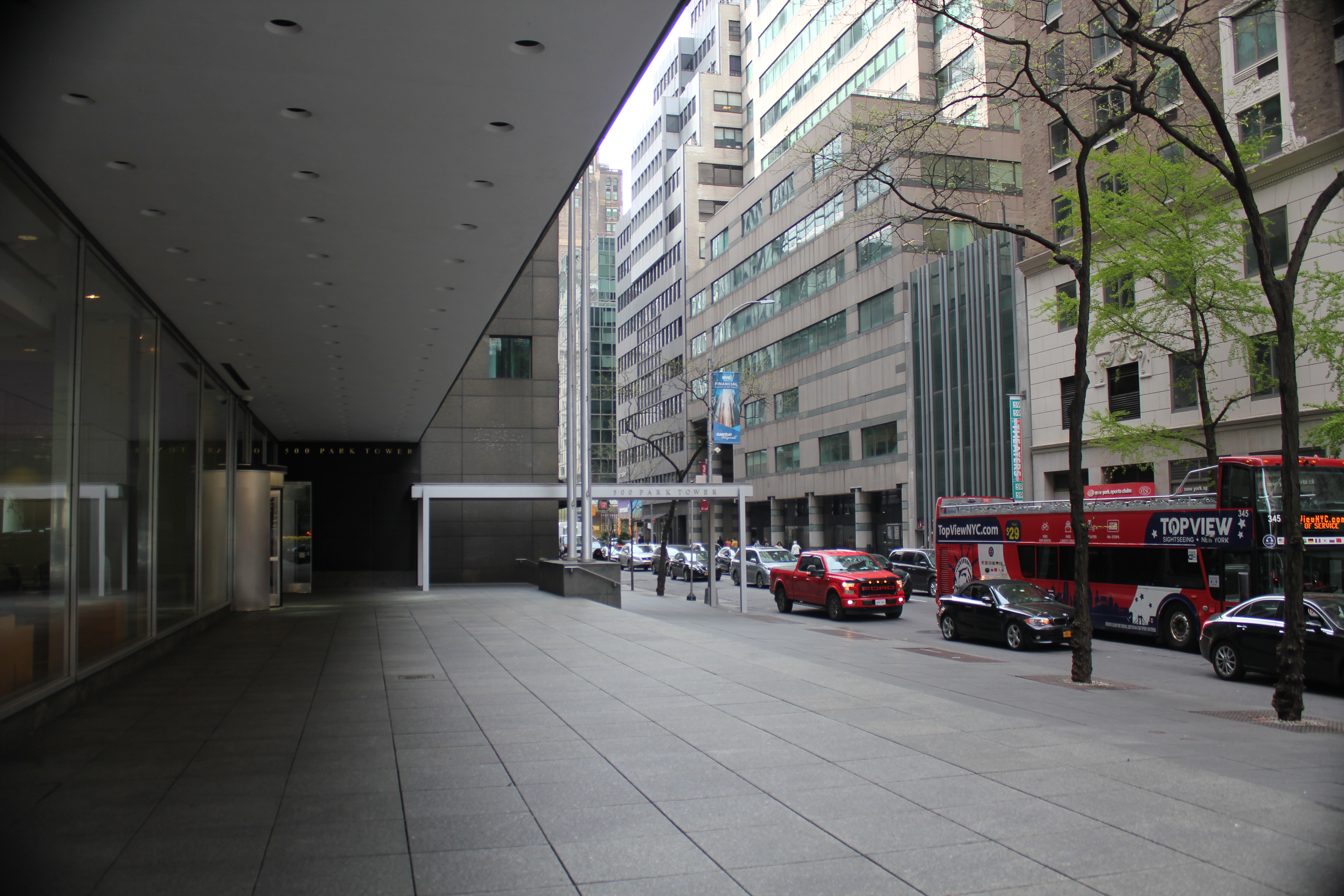
Cantilevered section above the lobby

The ground story is recessed 14 feet (4.3 m) from Park Avenue and 34 feet (10 m) from 59th Street, while the second through 10th floors are recessed 20 feet (6.1 m) from 59th Street. The ground-story wall consists of nearly full-height glass windows within stainless steel frames, which are set atop a granite sill. Several revolving doors are set within these windows on both Park Avenue and 59th Street. As originally designed, the revolving doors were lighted. Five groups of two reinforced-concrete columns cantilever the second through 10th stories above the lobby and part of the surrounding plaza, extending 13 feet (4.0 m) outward from the facade.

The second through 10th stories are composed of a curtain-wall facade. There are five bays of windows along the facade's Park Avenue (eastern) elevation and nine bays along the 59th Street (northern) elevation. The panels generally measure about 0.5 inches (1.27 cm) thick, 9 feet (2.7 m) tall, and 13 feet (4.0 m) wide. These glass panes were the largest available when the Pepsi-Cola Building was constructed. They were so large that they had to be stored inside the different stories of the building before installation. Neoprene strips were placed around the perimeters of each window pane, which was then coated into place with mastic. Vertical aluminum mullions protrude from between each bay and double as guide rails for window-washing equipment. The horizontal anodized aluminum spandrels between each story measure 0.25 inches (6.4 mm) thick and are flush with the glass panes. At night, the curtain wall appeared to be illuminated by the interior lighting scheme.

The southern end of the eastern elevation consists of a black granite wall that is recessed 15 feet (4.6 m) from Park Avenue, visually separating 500 Park Avenue from the adjacent building to the south. The recessed wall allowed SOM to design a symmetrical eastern elevation without touching the neighboring building, whose neo-Renaissance style conflicted with 500 Park Avenue's modern style. The granite slab contains a service entrance at ground level. Above the tenth floor is a balustrade with pipe railings. The roof of the tenth floor contains a roof terrace. The 11th-floor executive penthouse is recessed from the terrace for the same distance as the ground floor is recessed. The penthouse is capped by a railing and a mechanical structure; there is a water tower atop the mechanical structure. The penthouse contained the offices of actress Joan Crawford, the widow of Pepsi's chairman Alfred Steele, who had commissioned the building, but died before it was completed.

==== Interior ====
The building contains 103,178 square feet (9,585.5 m^{2}) of space. (Note: Sources disagree over the exact figure. Various figures cite 500 Park Avenue as having had 100,000 square feet (9,300 m^{2}) (sometimes described as over 100,000 square feet), 110,000 square feet (10,000 m^{2}), or 120,000 square feet (11,000 m^{2}) of space when it first opened.) The underside of the exterior cantilever contains a soffit that extends into the lobby's ceiling, which includes recessed spotlights. The lobby interior is uninterrupted, except for columns supporting the upper floors; the columns are made of fireproof concrete and clad with steel. There are eight columns in total. As with SOM's earlier Lever House, the lobby was used as a space for exhibits. When Amsterdam-Rotterdam Bank (Amro) moved into the basement and ground through third floors in 1982, the lobby was redesigned. One wall was clad with white marble and red strips; another wall had black fabric and red strips; and a cantilevered stair in the middle of the lobby led up to the second floor. Additional retail spaces were created by subdividing the lobby. An office lobby was created on the west end of the ground floor, leading to four elevators at the southern end of 500 Park Tower. A 55-seat screening room is accessible from this lobby.

The second through tenth floors contained offices divided in a 10-by-10-foot modular plan. The offices were designed in "restrained buff white with black line accents", as described by Architectural Forum. Luminous ceiling tiles, around the perimeter of each story, illuminated all the interior spaces. The window blinds were made of fabric and were described in contemporary accounts as part of the interior design, with their resemblance to mullions. (Note: See, for instance, Architectural Forum 1960, p. 108.) Furniture was also designed specifically for the Pepsi offices. Originally, the interior space was flexible, with no obstructions other than the structural columns. The offices were furnished by SOM–designed furniture and could be separated by metal-and-glass partition walls. Cubicles were installed during a 1980 renovation. The cubicle walls were aligned with the exterior bays, and the original luminous ceilings were replaced with plaster ceilings containing lighting fixtures. A stairwell and a glass-partitioned hall were also installed on the tenth and eleventh floors.

Abutting each window are rails that contain hidden heating and cooling equipment. The utilities and mechanical spaces are placed on the southern wall of each floor, with one set of men's and women's restrooms per floor, as well as air plenums. There are also two fire stairs, one each near the southwest and southeast corners of the structure, and three elevators, all near the southwest corner.

=== 500 Park Tower ===
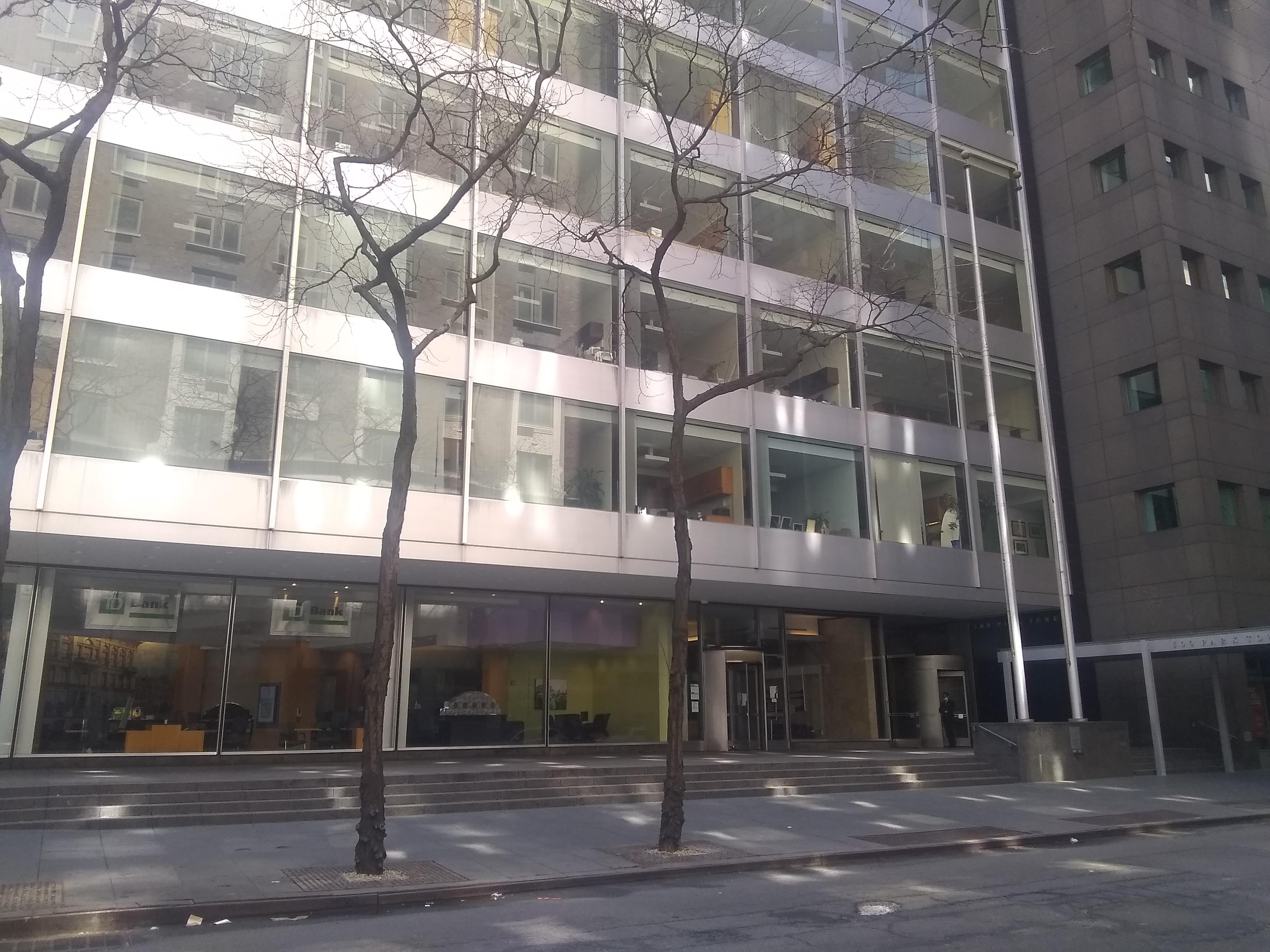
Public plaza on 59th Street outside the building

500 Park Tower was designed as a mixed-use office and residential structure. Its exterior combines a facade of gray-green granite cladding with thermal coating, as well as segments of glass-and-aluminum curtain walls that resemble the original building's exterior. On the east facade, 25 of the upper floors cantilever approximately 25 feet (7.6 m) over the original building. 500 Park Tower uses the air development rights from the original building to cantilever over that structure. According to architectural writer Robert A. M. Stern, the exterior design may have been influenced by the PSFS Building in Philadelphia.

The west and south facades contain a glass and aluminum cladding with thinner mullions that do not protrude from the facade. By contrast, the north and east facades largely contain granite cladding. At the corners of the glass and aluminum facades, there are black anodized aluminum joints to make the windows appear as if they are wrapping around the building. The granite facades contain punched windows recessed 1 foot (0.30 m) deep. The western part of the north facade has a slightly projecting oriel window from the second to tenth floors, with the glass and aluminum skin; the design was intended to emphasize how the tower was an extension of the original building. The cantilever on the eastern side is clad with glass and aluminum. The 12th floor of 500 Park Tower is designed as a "transitional story" with larger windows than the rest of the tower. The windows of the granite facade below this story are square, while the windows above this story have small asymmetrical "notches" at one corner to signify a transition between office and residential uses.

The residential lobby of 500 Park Tower is through a doorway on 59th Street. Inside is a small lobby with pink marble surfaces and gray granite strips. The lowest 11 stories are office space, a similar arrangement to the original structure. (Note: Also described as the lowest 12 floors.) The 12th through 40th stories are arranged as 56 condominiums, which range from 1,078 to 3,950 square feet (100.1 to 367.0 m^{2}) in area. The condominiums on the 12th through 18th stories are designed as pieds-à-terre, with three per floor. On higher stories, there are two apartments per floor, one each facing north and south. These upper-story apartments contained lavish rooms and window exposures to evoke the proportions of Park Avenue apartments in the early 20th century. The two duplex penthouses at the 39th and 40th floors were built with features such as fireplaces, galleries, private libraries, bathroom suites, entrance galleries, and nine-foot ceilings.

== History ==
The Pepsi-Cola Company was created in 1902 to sell Pepsi soft drinks. In the early 20th century, to compete with the rival Coca-Cola Company, Pepsi advertised its product as a cheap alternative to Coca-Cola. The tactic of advertising Pepsi products as inferior goods was successful during the Great Depression, but led to declining profits when Americans wished to celebrate their success after World War II. To reverse declining profits, Pepsi hired Alfred Steele as president in 1950, and sales and earnings per share increased dramatically within five years. By the end of the 1950s, Pepsi-Cola's profits had risen 300% in 10 years. The company decided to move to Park Avenue because of the presence of other corporate headquarters there.

=== Development ===
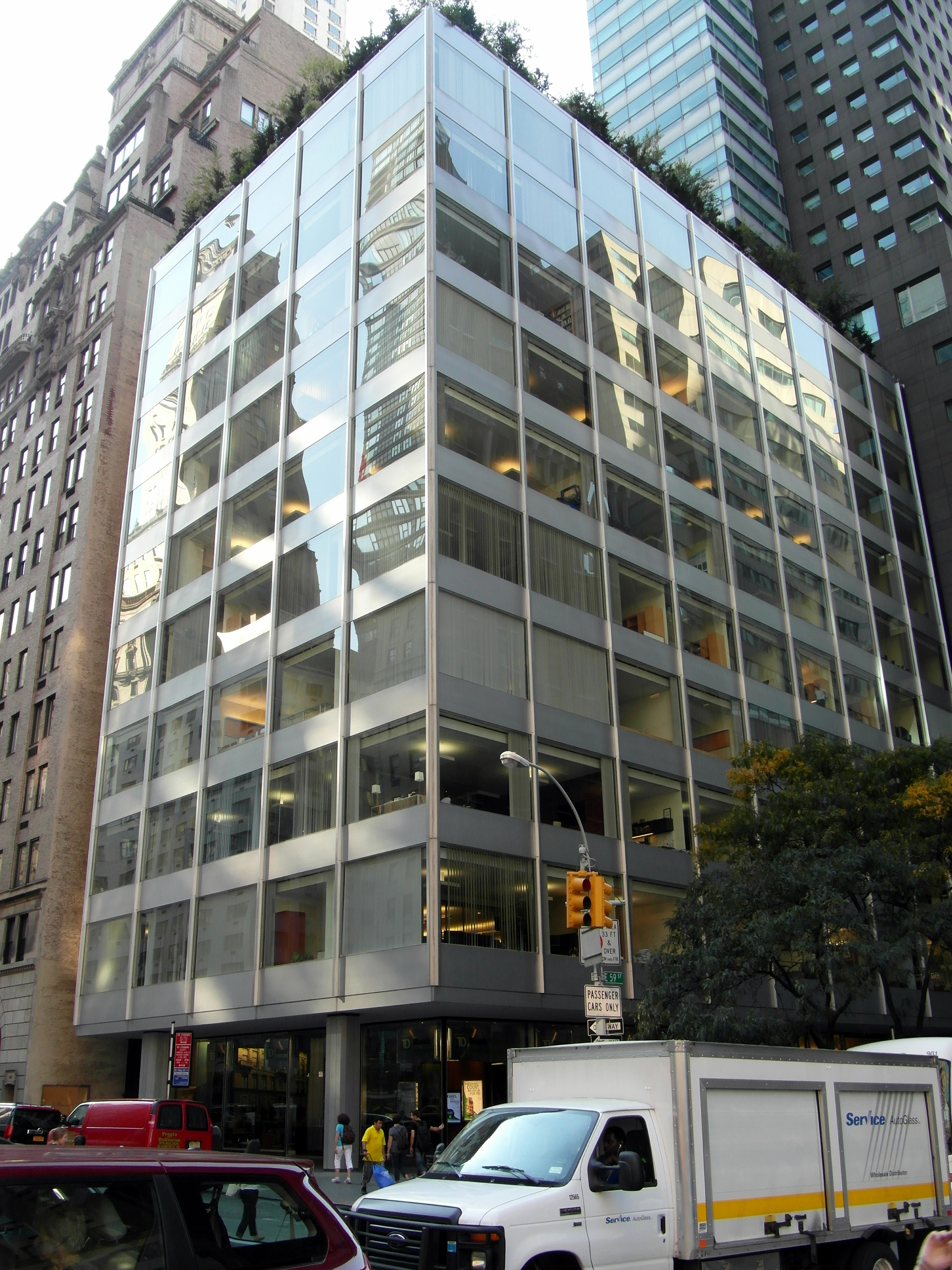
Seen from the median of Park Avenue

By the 1950s, the land under the Board of Education building was subject to high tax assessments, prompting the Fifth Avenue Association to suggest in 1955 that the city government sell the structure. The city vacated the building in January 1956 and placed it for auction that May. Pepsi paid $2 million for the Board of Education building one month later. This was described at the time as the largest-ever sale of a structure owned by the New York City government. The sale was controversial because the chairman of the New York City Planning Commission was, at the time, also a director of Pepsi-Cola. SOM filed plans for a new Pepsi headquarters at the site in January 1958.

Work on the Pepsi-Cola Building started in August 1958, and the building was sold to the John Hancock Mutual Insurance Company some time afterward. After Steele died in 1959, Donald M. Kendall became Pepsi president and oversaw the remainder of the construction. Robert W. Cutler of SOM was the partner in charge of construction and Albert Kennerly was project manager. The work also involved structural engineer Severud-Elstad-Krucger Associates, mechanical and electrical engineer Slocum & Fuller, acoustical engineer Bolt Beranek & Newman, and general contractor George A. Fuller Company. The original building's development was overseen by Herbert D. Warrington. The building ultimately cost $7.8 million to construct.

=== Pepsi and Olivetti ===
Pepsi dedicated 500 Park Avenue on February 1, 1960. Lynda Lee Mead, who had been crowned as Miss America 1960, performed the building's official ribbon-cutting, while two thousand Pepsi workers at the Waldorf Astoria New York watched the event on television. At first, Pepsi used the seven upper stories and leased out the remaining floors. Pepsi hired Douglas Elliman as the exclusive renting agent for the rental floors. One of these stories was leased to furniture company Macey-Fowler Inc. in November 1960. In the building's first six years, the lobby exhibition space was used for events such as a display of French art, a firearms exhibit, a series of photographs of Carnegie Hall's history, and a display of landmark preservation in the United States. By the mid-1960s, Pepsi was considering relocating to the suburbs. John Lindsay, the mayor of New York City, started a private campaign in September 1966 to convince Pepsi to remain within the city. Nevertheless, in February 1967, Pepsi announced it was moving to 112 acres (45 ha) on the Blind Brook Polo Club in Purchase, within suburban Westchester County. The Purchase site was close to Kendall's house in Greenwich, Connecticut.

When Pepsi announced plans to move to Purchase, it was negotiating to sell the building to Olivetti S.p.A., the Italian company that manufactured Olivetti typewriters. At the time, Olivetti was starting to manufacture a variety of mechanical products such as copiers, banking terminals, and electronic typewriters. By the end of 1967, Olivetti was planning to move to the Pepsi-Cola Building, but was waiting for Pepsi to vacate it. Pepsi had completely relocated to Purchase by 1970. After Olivetti moved into 500 Park Avenue, the structure became known as the Olivetti Building. During this era, the lobby continued to host exhibitions, such as a display of 20th-century Italian artwork. By 1978, Olivetti was nearly bankrupt, and its executives decided to relocate. The company's finances only improved in the year afterward.

The Olivetti Building was then owned by a syndicate led by Peter Kalikow, which had also acquired the eight-story Nassau Hotel immediately to the west on 59th Street. The Kalikow syndicate hired Eli Attia to study plans for redeveloping the sites. The then-new firm of Kohn Pedersen Fox reportedly devised fourteen proposals to incorporate the structure as the base of a skyscraper on the Nassau Hotel site. At the time, 500 Park Avenue's site was a prime candidate for redevelopment since it had a large volume of unused development rights. The building could not yet be protected by the New York City Landmarks Preservation Commission (LPC), whose rules specified that New York City individual landmarks be at least 30 years old at the time of their designation.

=== Amro and expansion ===
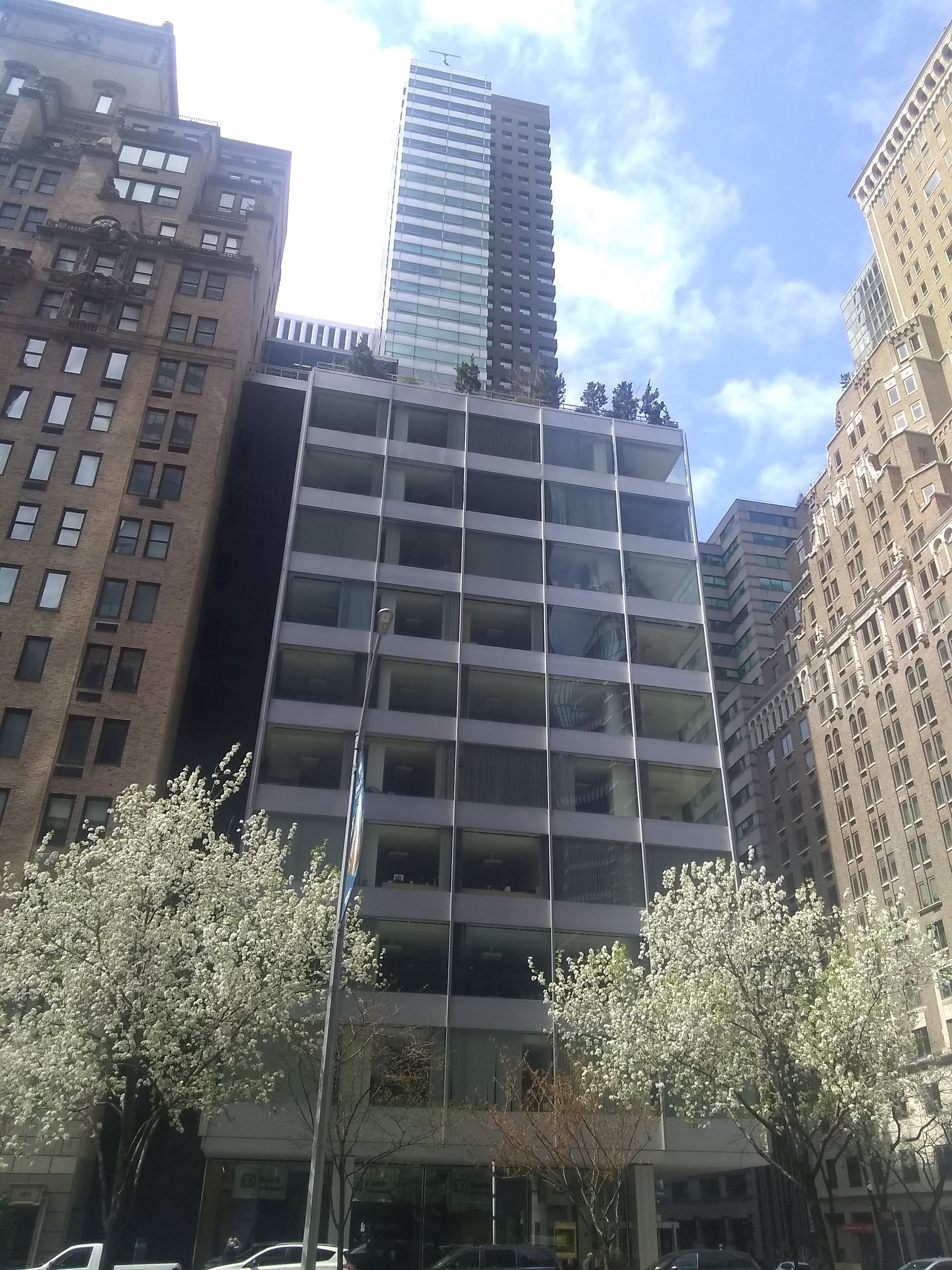
Original structure seen from across Park Avenue; the 500 Park Tower is in the background

By 1979, the Kalikow interests resold the structures to Securities Groups, led by brothers Charles and Randall Atkins, whose company 500 Park Avenue Associates paid over $40 million. That year, the Atkinses hired James Stewart Polshek & Partners to remodel the 10th and 11th floors for the offices of their company. Shortly afterward, they decided to redevelop the Nassau Hotel site while preserving the original structure; the brothers calculated that 250,000 square feet (23,000 m^{2}) would need to be built to make the development profitable. Polshek & Partners were subsequently hired to design an addition. The next year, the Amsterdam and Rotterdam Bank leased all the space from the basement to the seventh floor, except for part of the ground story. In preparation for the bank's relocation into the building, some of the space was renovated and the facade was cleaned.

In 1981, the Equitable Life Assurance Society purchased both 500 Park Avenue and the Nassau Hotel site from 500 Park Avenue Associates. Concurrently, Polshek & Partners proposed an annex of 73,000 square feet (6,800 m^{2}) for the original building, as well as a residential tower with 100 condominiums, to be cantilevered over the existing tower. The development was also delayed by the New York City Planning Commission (CPC), which was studying a potential change of zoning for Midtown Manhattan. At the time, zoning rules allowed structures with a floor area ratio (FAR) of 18; the FAR dictated the proportion of buildings' gross floor area to the size of their land lots. The proposed tower would have a FAR of 16.78, but the CPC wanted to reduce the maximum FAR for the area to 15. Amro opened a bank branch in the basement and the first through third floors in June 1982. 500 Park Avenue then became the Amro Bank Building; Amro subsequently merged with Algemene Bank Nederland (ABN) and became ABN AMRO.

Sales at 500 Park Tower launched in February 1983 with announcements in the European cities of St. Moritz, Monte Carlo, and Frankfurt. The Trump Corporation was hired as the sales consultant while Sotheby's International Realty was the selling agent. Equitable promoted 500 Park Tower's apartments as the city's most expensive, but the claim was disputed by Trump Corporation head Donald Trump, who was simultaneously developing Trump Tower five blocks away. 500 Park Tower's residential units were not expected to be ready until January 1984, but within a week of the sales launch, tenants were already in contract for eight apartments. By May 1983, deposits had been made for thirty-nine of the units, and a foreign investor had contracted to buy both penthouse duplex units for $9.5 million.

=== Later use ===
Observers largely perceived 500 Park Tower as a successful development when it was completed in 1984. Among the building's residents were developer Larry Silverstein, who lived there with his family for 33 years after its opening. Office tenants during the late 20th century included Gollust, Tierney & Oliver, which in 1990 was reportedly managing $900 million in funds from its fifth-floor office. By the mid-1990s, the office space not occupied by ABN Amro was occupied by The Walt Disney Company, which had its New York City offices there.

The LPC hosted public hearings in 1993 to determine whether to designate the original Pepsi-Cola Building as a city landmark. The original structure, excluding the 500 Park Tower addition, was designated as a city landmark on June 20, 1995. The commission's chairwoman, Jennifer Raab, said at the time that there was "a growing interest in postwar, modern architecture". Herbert Muschamp of The New York Times thought the designation to be ironic, as the landmarks law had originally been intended to "curtail the proliferation of modernist buildings and the loss of the fine old masonry edifices that they replaced". Equitable had decided by 1996 that it wanted to split off its Equitable Real Estate division. At the end of that year, Equitable reached an agreement to sell 500 Park Avenue and the company's other structures to Lendlease. Around 1997, the lobby was divided into two storefronts.

During the early 21st century, the office tenants included hedge funds Caxton Associates and Magnetar Capital, investment management firm Mentor Partners, investment advisor Solar Capital Partners, and private equity fund Public Pension Capital. SOM renovated the interior of the original building in 2016. As of 2021, the building and the tower addition were under separate ownership, with Morgan Stanley as the original structure's owner and Axa Equitable as the tower's owner. The fashion designer Vera Wang leased some office space in 2021, while the retail brand Frato leased one of the building's storefronts. Morgan Stanley considered selling the original building in 2024, and SL Green bought the original structure that November for $130 million. In addition, the fashion brand Tom Ford moved its headquarters to the sixth floor in 2025.

== Impact ==
=== Reception ===
==== Original building ====
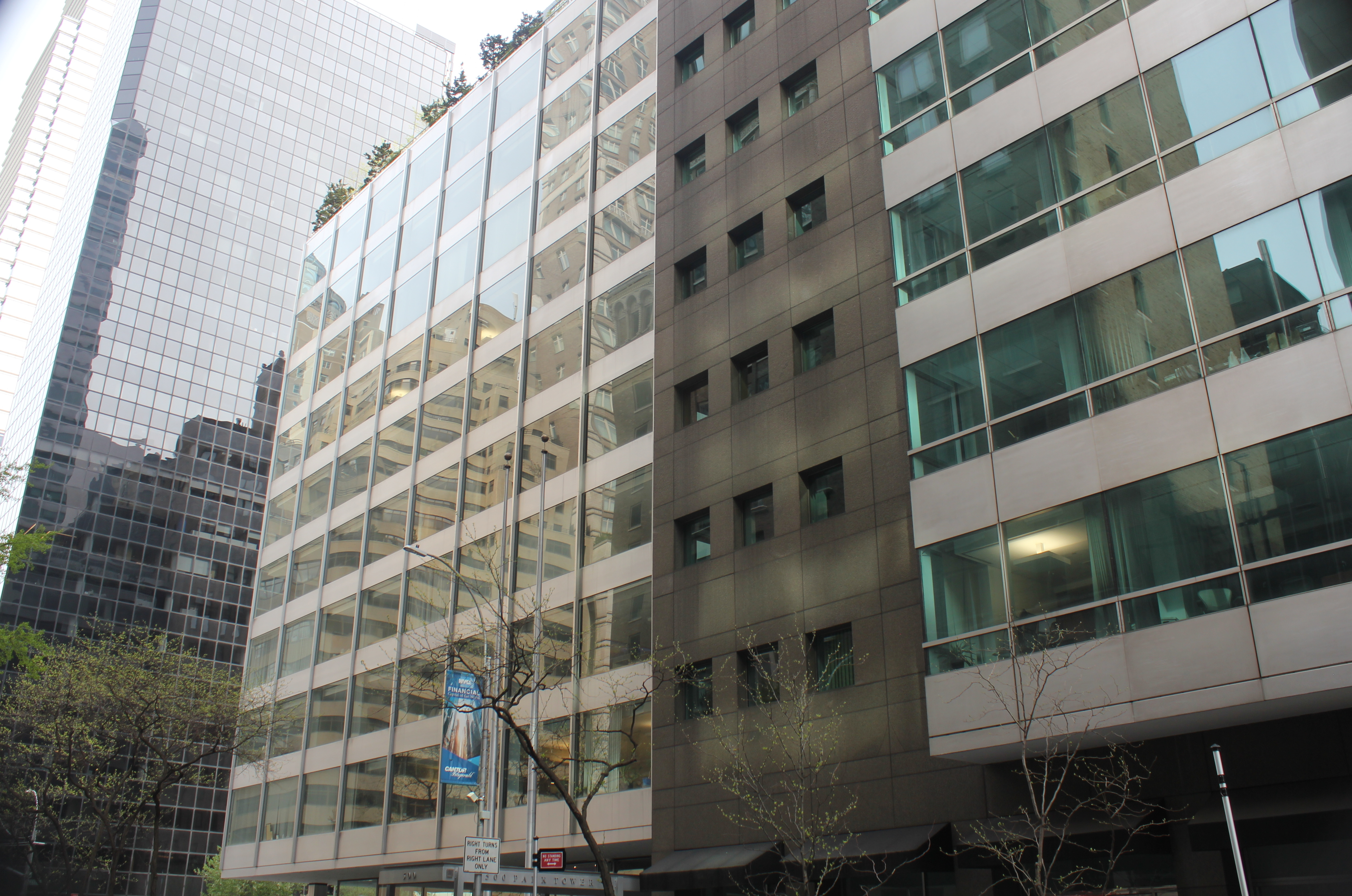
View along 59th Street, looking east toward the original structure, with the tower addition at right

Upon its opening in 1960, the Pepsi-Cola Building was widely praised. According to The New York Times, it was perceived by the general public as one of SOM's "handsomest designs". Architectural Design magazine said the relatively simple exterior enabled the building to "stand out and completely hold its own", while Architectural Forum described it as "the newest, smallest, and possibly the slickest corporate package in New York". Architectural Forum included the Pepsi-Cola Building and the TWA Flight Center as part of a 1962 exhibition of ten of the "world's most significant modern buildings". Although the building was sometimes described as "Miesian"—or like a building designed by Ludwig Mies van der Rohe—Bunshaft rejected such comparisons, saying that he had tried to minimize architectural detail while Mies had sought to "enrich".

Several years after its completion, John Jacobus characterized the building as the "most restrained and perfect of all commercial buildings". Ada Louise Huxtable of The New York Times characterized the building as "a kind of Pazzi Chapel of corporate design" in a 1981 article, while Carol Herselle Krinsky wrote in 1988 that "the well-scaled precision of Bunshaft's design harmonizes with modest dimensions", as at the Lever House and Manufacturers Trust Company Building. Krinsky likened 500 Park Avenue to SOM's Inland Steel Building in Chicago, which also had a recessed corner facade, a cantilevered steel-and-glass facade, and an offset structural core, but noted that 500 Park Avenue was "more repetitive" and simplistic than the Inland Steel Building. Upon Bunshaft's 1990 death, The New York Times wrote that his glass-slab designs like Lever House and the Pepsi-Cola Building "received nearly unanimous praise from the critics".

The Coca-Cola Building was one of ten SOM designs described in the 1992 Whitney Guide to 20th Century American Architecture, a list of 200 major designs in the United States during the 20th century. Robert A. M. Stern called the original structure "ambiguous in its urbanism but quite distinguished in its aesthetics" in 1995. After the lobby was divided into storefronts in the 1990s, Herbert Muschamp wrote for The New York Times: "The desecration of 500 Park raises the issue of how effectively landmark laws can protect glass buildings." The 2010 edition of the AIA Guide to New York City described the building as "understated elegance that bowed to the scale of its Park Avenue neighbors".

==== 500 Park tower ====
When 500 Park Tower was constructed, it was praised for harmonizing with the design of the original structure. Huxtable considered the plans to be "one of the most skillful of 'shoehorning' jobs" for an addition to a building in New York City, much better than the Palace Hotel or Park Avenue Plaza several blocks south. Architectural Record characterized the plans in 1983 as "sympathetic and reticent in style if not in scale". In the same journal the following year, Carter Wiseman said, "This building manages the neat trick of being authentically new while looking as if it has been there all along—or should have been." Also in 1984, Paul Goldberger wrote that he thought the design was largely successful, with the "only major failing" being the dark granite at the base. Two years after 500 Park Tower was completed, architectural writer Cervin Robinson said that "the expansion of the original space has been handled with grace and tact", describing Polshek & Partners' design as giving a "special pleasure".

=== Accolades ===
The original structure received architectural awards. The Municipal Art Society honored 500 Park Avenue as the "building of the year" for 1960, while the City Club of New York gave the building its 1964 "First Honor Award" for the best privately funded building constructed in the city since 1960. For its design of 500 Park Tower, Polshek & Partners received an Honor Award from the American Institute of Architects in 1986, as well as the Building Stone Institute's Tucker Architectural Award in 1987.

== See also ==
- List of New York City Designated Landmarks in Manhattan from 14th to 59th Streets
