= Equitable Building (Chicago) =

Office skyscraper in Chicago, Illinois

401 North Michigan
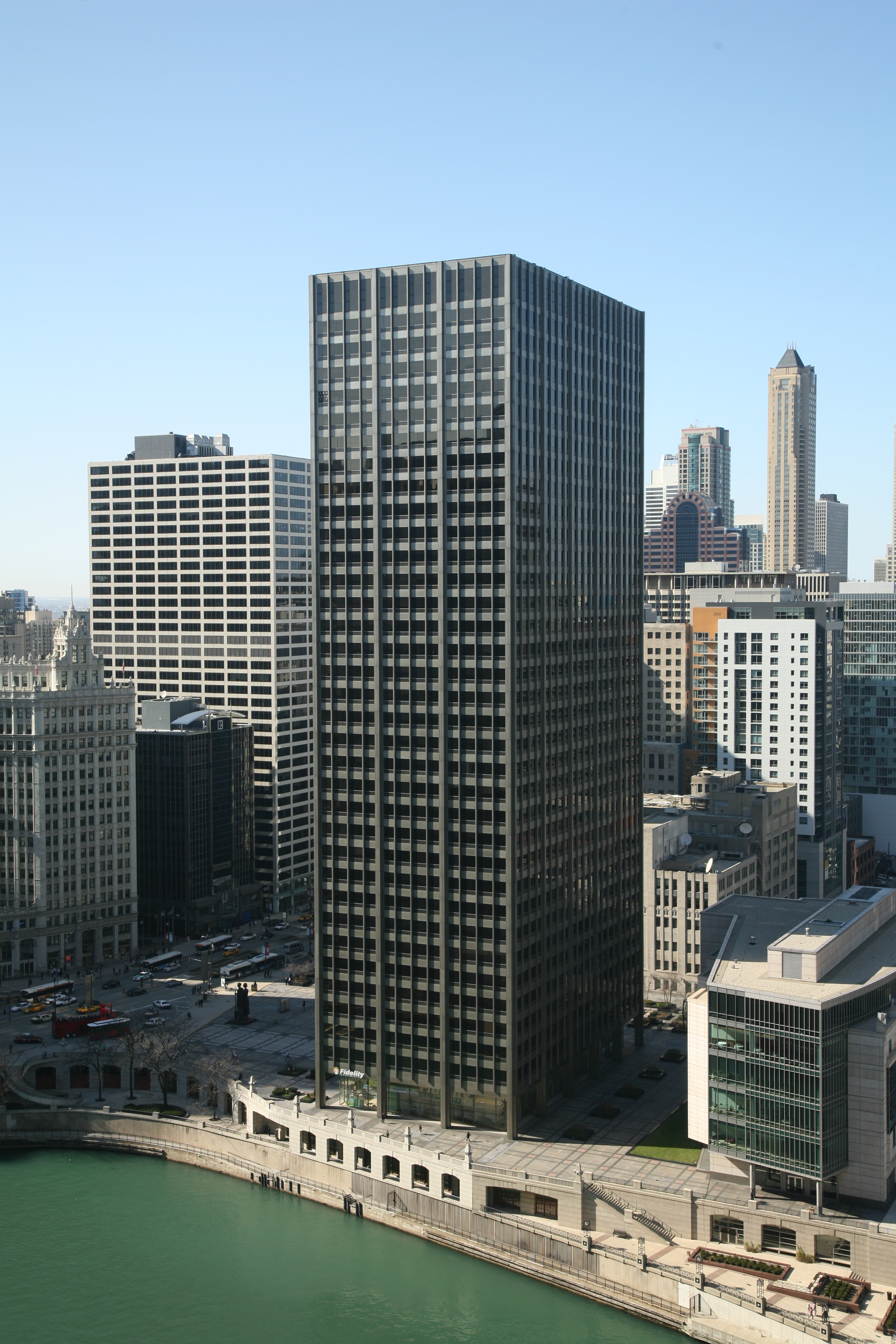
- Interactive map of the 401 North Michigan area
- Alternative names: Equitable Building

General information
- Location: Chicago, Illinois, US
- Coordinates: 41.889601°N 87.622977°W
- Completed: 1963–1965

Height
- Height: 457 feet (139 m)

Technical details
- Floor count: 35 total
- Floor area: 800,000 sq ft (74,000 m^{2})

Design and construction
- Architect: Skidmore, Owings & Merrill

401 North Michigan is a 35-story skyscraper in the Streeterville area of Chicago, built in 1965 at 401 North Michigan Avenue, along the north bank of the Chicago River. It was designed by Bruce Graham and Natalie de Blois in the international style. Along with the Tribune Tower and Wrigley Building, it forms the southern gateway to Chicago's famous Magnificent Mile. The building was built atop the site of a cabin belonging to Chicago's first permanent resident, Jean Baptiste Pointe du Sable. In reference to du Sable, the large plaza adjacent to the building has been named Pioneer Court.

== History ==
401 North Michigan occupies a site with several aspects of historical significance, both on a local and national scale. The site was originally settled by du Sable around 1779, and operated as a personal residence and fur-trading post, forming the very beginnings of the city of Chicago. In 1803, Fort Dearborn was built by the United States government immediately across the river, helping to protect the growing trading post from local Native American tribes. One year later in 1804, John Kinzie bought du Sable's property and occupied it until his death in 1828. In 1849, Cyrus McCormick moved to Chicago to set up a factory for his invention, the horse-drawn reaper, and purchased several lots on the former du Sable/Kinzie property, eventually developing a large factory complex. After this factory burned in the Great Chicago Fire in 1871, McCormick moved his factory to the West Side. Even as Michigan Avenue was slowly rebuilt into the city's premier street beginning in the 1920s, the site remained industrial in usage, and by 1961, it had become a parking lot.

In 1961, the Equitable Life Assurance Society of the United States announced its intention to construct a new, modern office tower at the 401 North Michigan site, relocating its sizable Chicago offices from cramped space at 29 South LaSalle Street. The announcement described the proposed 800,000 sq ft (74,000 m^{2}) tower as a "glittering structure of metal, marble, and glass set amid a picturesque plaza." Construction began in 1963 and concluded in 1965.

In addition to Equitable, one of the largest tenants of the building—occupying 12 floors—was the International Harvester Company (now Navistar International Corporation), the descendant of Cyrus McCormick's original reaper works, which intended to "return to its birthplace."

Equitable no longer maintains offices in the building, which is currently marketed as 401 North Michigan. In 2003, NBC 5 Chicago opened a street-level studio at the lobby level of the Equitable Building, becoming the first Chicago television station to open such a studio, and starting a trend. ABC 7 Chicago and CBS 2 would open their own street-level studios several years later in other downtown locations.

In 2017 the riverfront restaurant and helical staircase were replaced by a new flagship store for Apple, also with the address 401 N Michigan Ave. The store was designed by the London-based architecture firm Foster + Partners.

Pioneer Court, often mistakenly called "Pioneer Plaza", is largely the great civic space imagined at the time of its construction. Since it was built, it has hosted numerous art installations, performances, civic events, advertising events, and festivals. It has also been featured in several films and television advertisements. In 1992, Pioneer Court was redesigned and extended eastward around the office tower by Cooper, Robertson & Partners in a vaguely Postmodernist style, in conjunction with the massive Cityfront Center development just to the east.

== Architecture ==
The box-shaped building, designed by Bruce Graham and Natalie de Blois of Skidmore, Owings, and Merrill, was designed in the International Style with large columns and spandrel beams expressed on each facade and covered in anodized aluminum, complemented by large windows on all four sides of the building. As in many office towers, a core containing stairs, elevators, and bathrooms lies at the center.

At the urging of the Chicago Tribune, Graham designed the building with a 175-foot (53 m) setback from Michigan Avenue, to avoid blocking views of the Chicago River from the Tribune's nearby building. A large plaza created by this setback was named Pioneer Court, envisioned by both Equitable and the Tribune as a monumental civic space in Chicago honoring various civic founders, including du Sable and Kinzie. The plaza is at the elevated level of Michigan Avenue, and would be paved in granite, with trees and a large reflecting pond. Underneath the building and plaza were to be commercial spaces and parking, as well as an existing single-track railroad line leading to Navy Pier. Along the river edge, Graham designed a curvilinear promenade for a riverfront restaurant with a helical staircase down from the plaza above.
