= Vantage Specialty Chemicals =

American specialty chemicals company

Vantage Specialty Chemicals, Inc.
- Company type: Private
- Industry: Speciality chemicals
- Founded: 2008; 18 years ago
- Headquarters: Chicago, Illinois, United States
- Key people: Stephen Doktycz (CEO)
- Parent: H.I.G. Capital, LLC
- Website: www.vantagegrp.com

Vantage Specialty Chemicals, Inc. is an American speciality chemicals company headquartered in Chicago, Illinois. Vantage operates through four business units: Personal Care, Performance Materials, Oleochemicals, and Foods.

Its Personal Care unit provides chemical ingredients for hair, skin, sun care and other cosmetic products. Vantage Performance Materials produces chemicals with applications in oil and gas, food production, lubricants, precision cleaning and other industry specialties. Vantage is one of the largest oleochemical producers in the United States.

Vantage was formed in 2008 when private equity (PE) firm H.I.G. Capital acquired Uniqema's operations in the United States from Croda International. Uniqema was a global oleochemical manufacturer which was acquired by Croda from Imperial Chemical Industries (ICI) in 2006. Under H.I.G.'s ownership, Vantage expanded through a series of acquisitions, including Lambent Technologies in 2008 (which became Vantage's Performance Materials unit) and Lipo Chemicals in 2010 (which became the Personal Care unit). H.I.G. then sold Vantage to mid-market PE firm The Jordan Company in 2012.

In 2016, Vantage acquired baking products maker Mallet & Co., which became the company's Foods unit.

H.I.G. re-acquired majority ownership in Vantage in 2017 via a leveraged buy-out, with Jordan retaining a minority stake. This transaction closed on October 26, 2017.
