= Connecticut General Life Insurance Company Headquarters =

- U.S. National Register of Historic Places
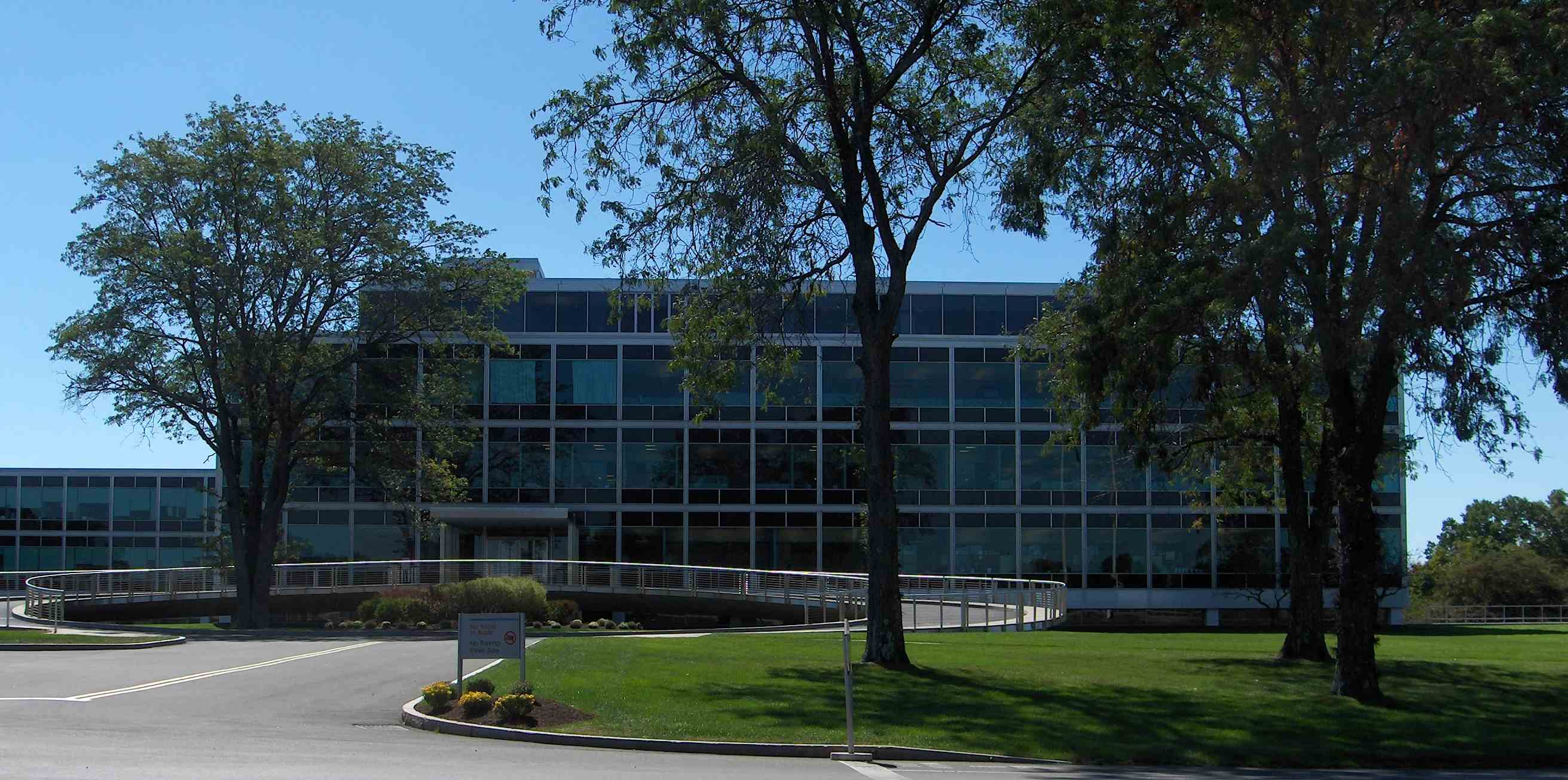

- Location within Connecticut Location within the United States
- Location: 900 Cottage Grove Road, Bloomfield, Connecticut
- Coordinates: 41°48′49.35″N 72°44′41.64″W
- Area: 30.5 acres (12.3 ha)
- Built: 1957
- Architectural style: International
- NRHP reference No.: 09000324
- Added to NRHP: January 27, 2010

The Connecticut General Life Insurance Company Headquarters is a commercial office complex at 900 Cottage Grove Road in Bloomfield, Connecticut. It was listed on the National Register of Historic Places on January 27, 2010. Built between 1954 and 1957, it is an important early example of suburban commercial office architecture, and one of the state's best examples of the International style of architecture. It continues to serve as the corporate headquarters for Cigna, as the company is now known.

== Description and history ==
The current Cigna headquarters complex occupies about 30 acres (12 ha) (out of what was originally about 280 acres (110 ha)), on the south side of Cottage Grove Road in southwestern Bloomfield. Former elements of the campus include the Gillette Ridge Golf Club, developed in 2004. The main building, now called the Wilde Building, is a large three-story structure, with a steel frame and largely glass exterior. The building is about 600 feet (180 m) long, with six interior courtyards, laid out so that no interior space is more than 30 feet (9.1 m) from a window. The steel framing elements are on the outside and courtyard walls, and serve as mullion-like separators between the window units. The interior floor plan is broken up by service cores, which house stairwells, elevators, and restrooms as well as other building infrastructure. There are escalators at roughly opposite ends of the building, providing additional access between the floors. A single-story cafeteria wing projects to the south.

The building was designed by Gordon Bunshaft of Skidmore, Owings and Merrill, on a 280-acre (110 ha) campus, and was completed in 1957. According to the architecture firm, "The bucolic site, campus-like plan, and extensive amenities, including a full service cafeteria and after-hours programs, reflected a desire to offer a highly civilized and satisfying office environment to Connecticut General employees. The building set new standards for flexible space planning, efficiency of operation, economy of construction methods, maintenance programs, and planning for future expansion." The project won various architectural and landscape awards. The grounds, including two of the interior courtyards, were landscaped by sculptor and landscape architect Isamu Noguchi. The interiors of the building were designed by Florence Knoll. The campus was the first of its type to be designed for a large corporate employer as office space, and was described by architect Michael Crosbie as an "inspiration for a generation of office parks".

== See also ==
- Phoenix Life Insurance Company Building, NRHP-listed in Hartford
- National Register of Historic Places listings in Hartford County, Connecticut
