= 140 Broadway =

Office skyscraper in Manhattan, New York

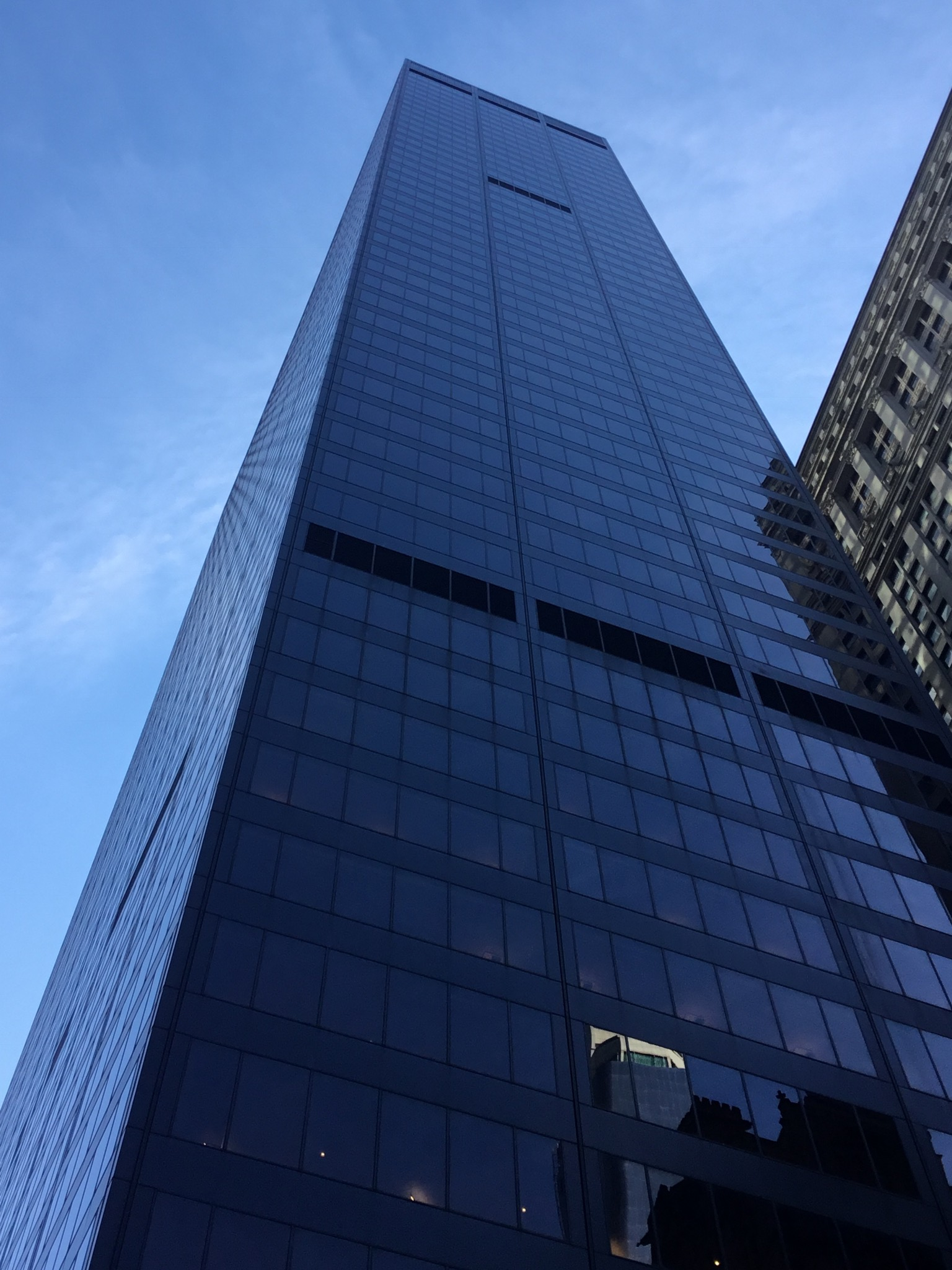
- The western facade viewed from the ground in February 2023
- Interactive map of the 140 Broadway area
- Alternative names: Marine Midland Building; HSBC Bank Building

General information
- Status: Completed
- Architectural style: International Style
- Location: 140 Broadway; Manhattan, New York 10005; U.S.
- Coordinates: 40°42′31″N 74°00′36″W
- Construction started: 1964
- Completed: 1967
- Owner: Union Investment

Height
- Roof: 688 ft (210 m)

Technical details
- Floor count: 52
- Floor area: 111,805 m^{2} (1,203,460 ft^{2})

Design and construction
- Architect: Gordon Bunshaft (Skidmore, Owings and Merrill)
- Structural engineer: James Ruderman

New York City Landmark
- Designated: June 25, 2013
- Reference no.: 2530

140 Broadway (formerly known as the Marine Midland Building or the HSBC Bank Building) is a 51-story International Style office building on the east side of Broadway between Cedar and Liberty streets in the Financial District of Manhattan in New York City. The building was designed by Gordon Bunshaft, of the firm Skidmore, Owings & Merrill, and consists of a mostly smooth black facade on a trapezoidal plot. It is approximately 688 feet (210 m) tall, with approximately 1.17 million rentable square feet (109,000 m^{2}). It is known for the distinctive sculpture at its entrance, Isamu Noguchi's Cube.

The developer Erwin S. Wolfson acquired the site in several stages between 1952 and 1961. Initial plans called for a 36-story monolith, but when Wolfson died, the architects modified their plans to a 51-story tower, which occupied only two-fifths of the block and conformed to the 1961 Zoning Resolution. The building was erected between late 1964 and 1967 and was originally known for its main tenant, the Marine Midland Corporation (later part of HSBC). Several early tenants were affiliated with the financial industry, including banking and accounting firms. In 1998, the building was sold to Silverstein Properties, which undertook a major renovation.

The primary tenant of the building since 2002 is Brown Brothers Harriman, filling a vacancy left after HSBC relocated in 2001. The building has been owned by Union Investment since 2004, and the New York City Landmarks Preservation Commission designated the building as a city landmark in 2013. Reviews of the building among architecture critics have been largely positive, with several praising the structure's smooth black facade.

== Site ==
140 Broadway is located on an entire city block bounded to the west by Broadway, to the north by Liberty Street, to the east by Nassau Street, and to the south by Cedar Street. The block is an irregular trapezoid, with all of its frontages being of different lengths. The block measures 144 feet (44 m) along Broadway, 318 feet (97 m) along Liberty Street, 184 feet (56 m) along Nassau Street, and 301 feet (92 m) along Cedar Street. The building occupies two-fifths of the block, with dimensions of between 87 and 209 feet (27 and 64 m). Its footprint is rhomboid, matching the shape of the block. Roger N. Radford, the leader of the team that designed 140 Broadway, stated that many of the tenants he knew were unaware of the building's "funny shape".

Within 140 Broadway's immediate surroundings are One Liberty Plaza to the northwest; the Chamber of Commerce of the State of New York and the Liberty Tower to the north; the Federal Reserve Bank of New York Building to the northeast; 28 Liberty Street to the east; the Equitable Building to the south; the Trinity and United States Realty Buildings to the southwest; and Zuccotti Park to the west. Trinity Church and Wall Street are located two blocks south.

=== Former buildings ===
Former buildings at 140 Broadway

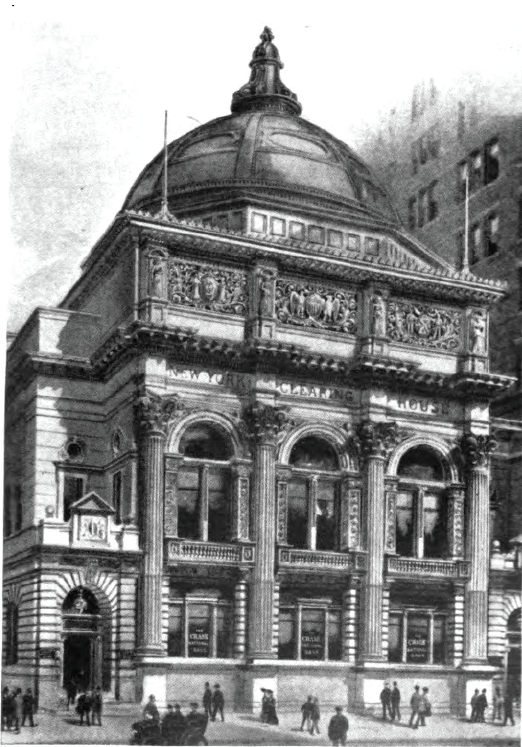
The New York Clearing House at 77-81 Cedar Street

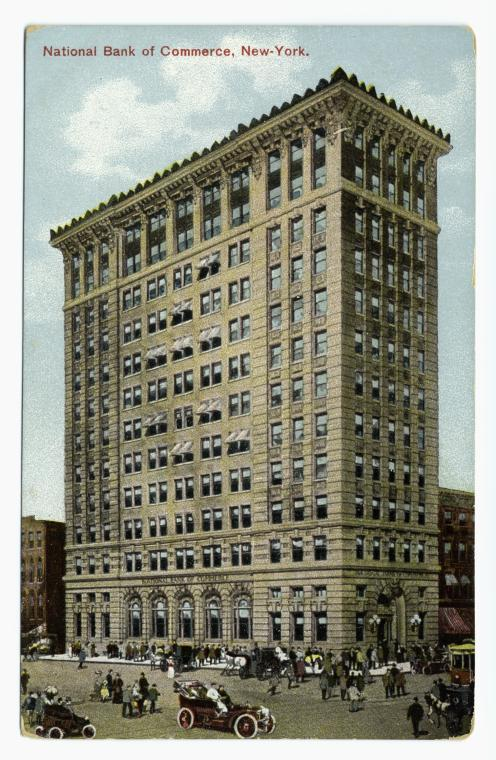
The National Bank of Commerce at 31-33 Nassau Street

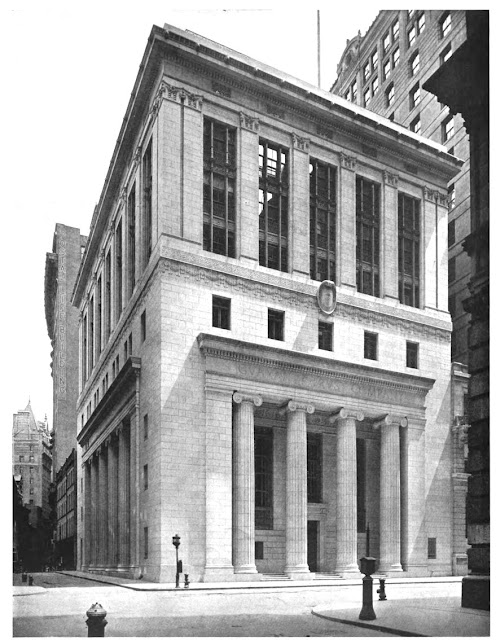
The Guaranty Trust Building, the original 140 Broadway

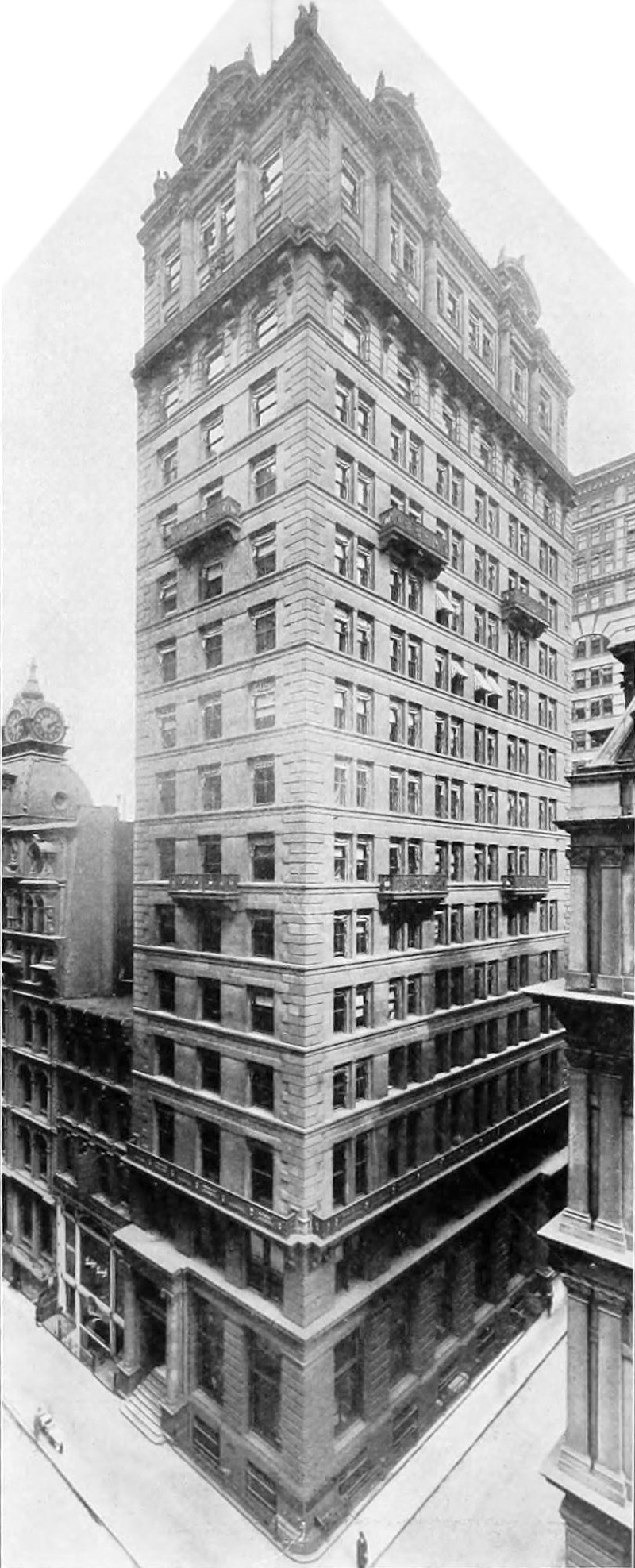
The American Exchange National Bank at 128 Broadway

The six plots on the block had been owned by different entities including The Clearing House, the National Bank of Commerce, and the Guaranty Trust Company (later part of J.P. Morgan & Co.), and had five buildings between nine and nineteen stories tall. The plots were combined under a common ownership between 1952 and 1962.

The Guaranty Trust Company acquired 140 Broadway, then consisting of just the southeast corner of Broadway and Liberty Street, in 1911. Guaranty Trust also obtained part of the adjacent 132 Broadway to the south. The 7-story Mutual Life Insurance Building, designed by York & Sawyer in a neoclassical style, was constructed on the site in 1912.

The American Exchange National Bank had occupied the site at 128 Broadway (at the corner with Cedar Street) since 1857–1858. The American Exchange National Bank Building, a 16-story early skyscraper, was built there in 1900. The exterior was made of granite and Indiana limestone, while the interior was made of marble. To the south, a 5-story commercial building had existed at 130 Broadway since the mid-19th century; this structure had a Victorian design with a limestone facade. In 1912, the American Exchange Bank purchased the building and demolished it to enlarge their own building. In 1928, the buildings were sold to the Guaranty Trust Company, after the American Exchange Bank's merger with the Irving Trust Company. At 77–81 Cedar Street was the New York Clearing House Building, the site for which was acquired in 1893. The Clearing House commissioned Robert W. Gibson in 1894 to design an Italian Renaissance structure made of white marble. The building was three stories high, with a domed roof, Corinthian colonnaded lower stories, and statues on the third story of the facade.

The National Bank of Commerce began developing another early skyscraper, this one 18 stories, at 31-33 Nassau Street (at the corner with Cedar Street) in 1896. The structure was designed in the Renaissance Revival style by James B. Baker and was made of granite, brick, and terracotta. Sculptor Karl Bitter carved two large figures above the main entrance, which generated controversy due to their being nude.

== Architecture ==
140 Broadway was designed by Skidmore, Owings & Merrill (SOM) in the International Style, with Gordon Bunshaft as the lead on the project. It was erected by the Diesel Construction Company, co-founded by prolific real-estate developer Erwin S. Wolfson, (Note: Wolfson's other projects included 100 Church Street, 529 Fifth Avenue, and the MetLife Building.) and led by Carl Morse at the time of the building's construction. Roger N. Radford was the design team's leader; Allan Labie was the project manager; Bradley B. Sullivan was the job captain; and James Ruderman was the structural engineer. Thomas Crimmins Construction Company were hired to excavate the site, and U.S. Steel provided the steel.

140 Broadway contains 51 stories and measures either 677 feet (206 m) or 688 feet (210 m) tall. It has about 21,000 to 24,000 square feet (2,000 to 2,200 m^{2}) on each floor, or 1.2 million square feet (110,000 m^{2}) total. The structure uses a frame weighing 14,000 short tons (12,000 long tons; 13,000 t). Because of 140 Broadway's energy efficiency, the U.S. Green Building Council has certified 140 Broadway as a Leadership in Energy and Environmental Design Gold structure.

Inside the building are open plan offices, illuminated by sunlight from the large windows on the facade; some offices have curved walls. There is an amenity space with a pool room, a snack bar, and 100-person meeting room that could be subdivided.

=== Form and facade ===
The New York City Department of City Planning passed the 1961 Zoning Resolution in October 1960, and the new zoning rules became effective in December 1961, superseding the 1916 Zoning Resolution. Rather than the inclusion of setbacks that the old zoning laws had encouraged, the new zoning laws allowed skyscrapers to have a bulky massing with additional floor area, in exchange for the inclusion of ground-level open spaces. 140 Broadway's design strictly adhered to the 1961 law; according to Radford, the law "force[d] the mass of the building toward the center of the site".

Harry Helmsley, who took over the building's development after Wolfson's death, sought to emphasize the building's vertical axis. As a result, Radford decided to emphasize the vertical window-washing tracks along the black-aluminum facade. The facade is otherwise smooth, with dark glass panels as well as slightly textured aluminum window trim. The western facade has three vertical bays of six windows each, while the eastern facade has four bays of six windows. The northern and southern facades each have seven bays of six windows. Little else was attached to the facade, except for signs with the number 140 on both faces of either southern corner, as well as the name of the Marine Midland Bank on the Broadway and Cedar Street sides. There are numerous revolving doors on all four sides that provide access to the building.

Initial plans called for a rectangular building with a light-gray, grid-like facade made of concrete or aluminum. (Note: This would have been similar to Houston's First City National Bank Building, New Orleans's K&B Plaza, and Midtown Manhattan's 500 Park Avenue, all designed by SOM.) The building had been redesigned by 1965 to have a smooth facade that harmonized with the surrounding masonry buildings while standing out from its surroundings. One critic wrote that the previous design had 140 Broadway as "a little brother to [28 Liberty Street] in the same shiny finish", which he said "would have looked like a poor relation." Another compared the new plan to contemporary graphic design and Ad Reinhardt's "black" paintings. The design of 140 Broadway's facade was also patterned after the Equitable Life Assurance Building, designed by Pietro Belluschi in Portland, Oregon.

=== Plaza ===
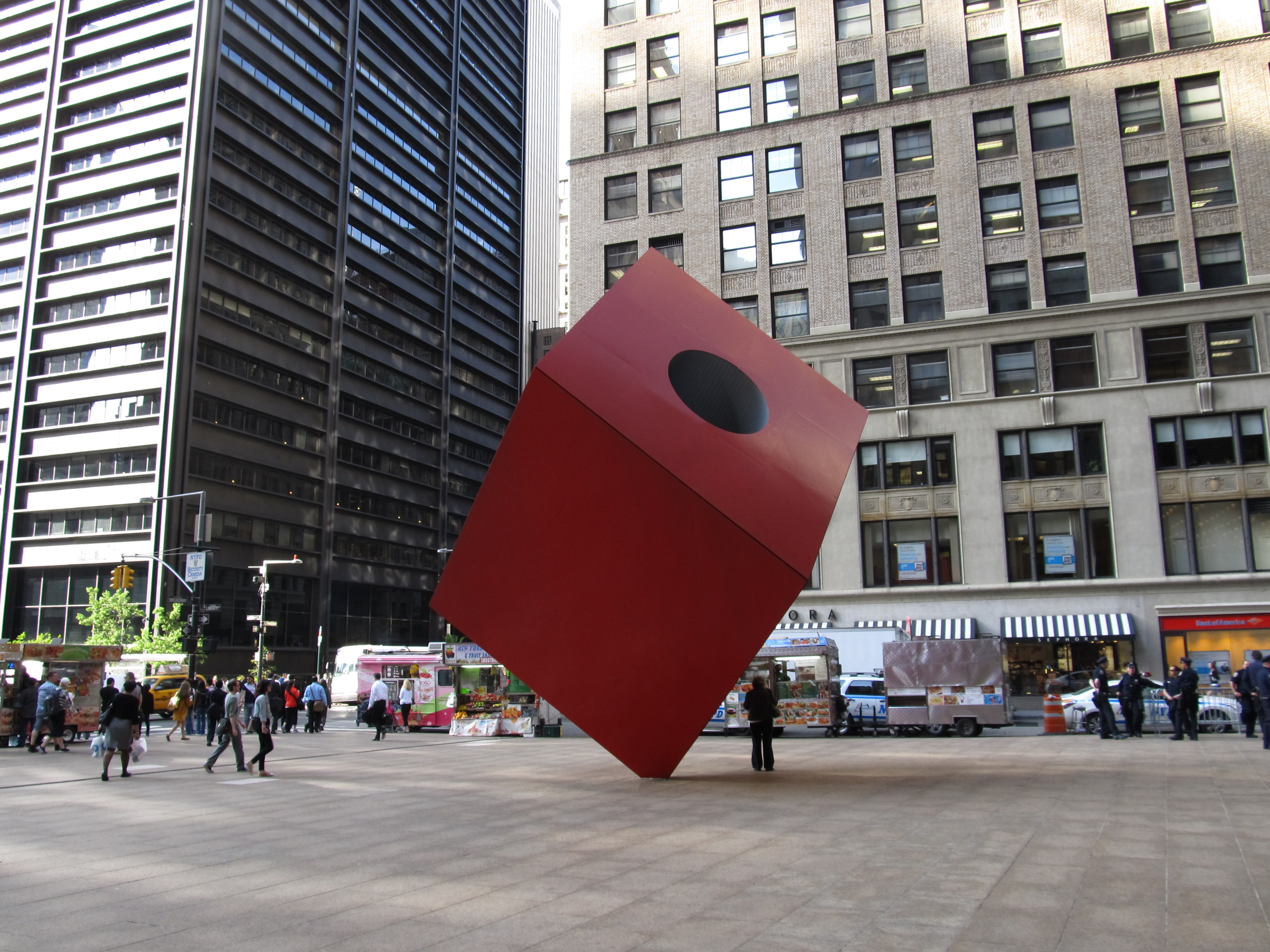
The Cube

140 Broadway is set back 80 feet (24 m) from the curb on Broadway, 30 feet (9.1 m) from Cedar Street's curb, and 25 feet (7.6 m) from Liberty Street's curb. A public plaza is located in this intermediate space and is made of tiled white travertine. An entrance to the New York City Subway's Broad Street station existed on the plaza's southeast corner but was removed by 1999. A granite monument to Harry Helmsley was located at the plaza's southwest corner, this has since been replaced by a plaque in the monument's footprint. The sidewalks on all sides of 140 Broadway are 20 feet (6.1 m) wide and are maintained by the New York City Department of Transportation rather than the building's owners, but are sometimes considered part of the plaza.

==== The Cube ====
According to Radford, Bunshaft suggested that Isamu Noguchi be involved with the project. During the building's construction, Noguchi was commissioned to create a sculpture for the portion of the plaza facing Broadway. He had originally proposed a "megalith" or a "cluster of primitivisitic monoliths". However, Helmsley felt that the "megalith" would have cost too much. Subsequently, Bunshaft had suggested combining Noguchi's "series of rocks" into a single block.

Noguchi's final sculpture, titled The Cube, was installed in 1968. It is a vermilion-hued rhombohedron with a cylindrical hole through its center, standing upon one corner and measuring 28 feet (8.5 m) tall. The Cube is located off-center, on the north side of the plaza, contrasting with 140 Broadway's dark facade while turning viewers' attention toward the surrounding plaza. Like 140 Broadway, it was detailed by SOM and has an aluminum frame. Bunshaft praised The Cube as "work[ing] beautifully with the building [in] every way", while Metropolitan Museum of Art director Thomas Hoving said that the cube was a sign of "change in public taste".

== History ==
=== Planning and construction ===
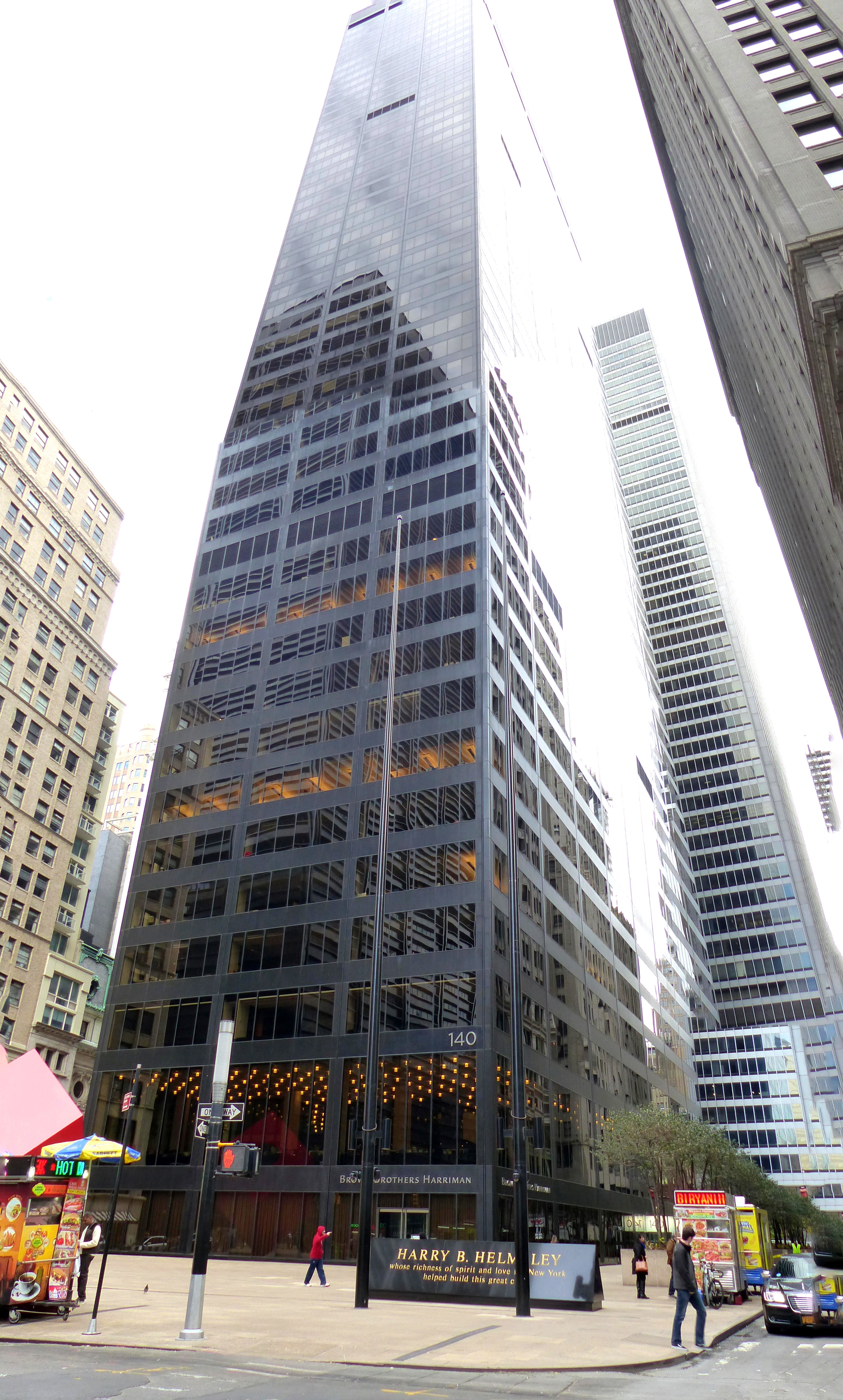
Viewed from Broadway and Cedar Street

In August 1961, Wolfson purchased the entire city block bounded by Cedar, Liberty, and Nassau Streets, and Broadway. The assemblage consisted of six plots owned by J.P. Morgan, who had acquired five of the plots from other landowners. At the time, Wolfson was planning a 32-story building on the site, a bulky mass that would conform with the 1961 Zoning Resolution, as well as allow for the widening of Liberty Street in conjunction with the construction of 28 Liberty Street, then known as One Chase Manhattan Plaza. Wolfson's building would have had masonry canopies protruding from the floor plates. Also in 1961, SOM was hired as the architecture firm for the proposed building.

Wolfson died suddenly in June 1962. Upon Morse's request, developer Harry Helmsley agreed to collaborate on the project, and Helmsley created the 140 Broadway Corporation. Lawrence A. Wien also became a sponsor of the project. The plans were modified in May 1963 to provide for a 40-story skyscraper occupying two-fifths of the block. The modified plans also provided for closing Cedar Street, thereby forming a pedestrian plaza extending to 28 Liberty Street, as well as adding subway entrances. By June 1964, Wolfson's estate and Helmsley were about to submit plans for the building. Two months later, Wien withdrew from the project and Helmsley modified the building to have 49 floors, still occupying two-fifths of the block. The architects submitted a new-building application to the New York City Department of Buildings in early 1964, though minor changes to the plans were made in subsequent months.

Demolition of existing buildings on the site started in June 1964. The builders endeavored to reduce noise as much as possible: demolition took place only during off-peak hours, and heavy blankets were used to muffle the sound of blasting as well as contain the debris. Site excavation was completed in the middle of the following year, and construction of the building frame commenced, with 600 workers being employed. Keeping with the noise-reduction policy of the foundation's excavation, the building utilized a "butt-welded structural frame", which necessitated less time on the noisy processes of bolting and riveting. One floor was built every two days, and 140 Broadway topped out during June 1966. One person working nearby stated that his lawnmower made more noise than the building's construction. Bunshaft recalled that the building's cost was higher than average "due to the wisdom of Wolfson initially, Helmsley waking up, and Carl Morse urging that it not be the cheapest building in the world but the most economical one...."

=== Usage ===
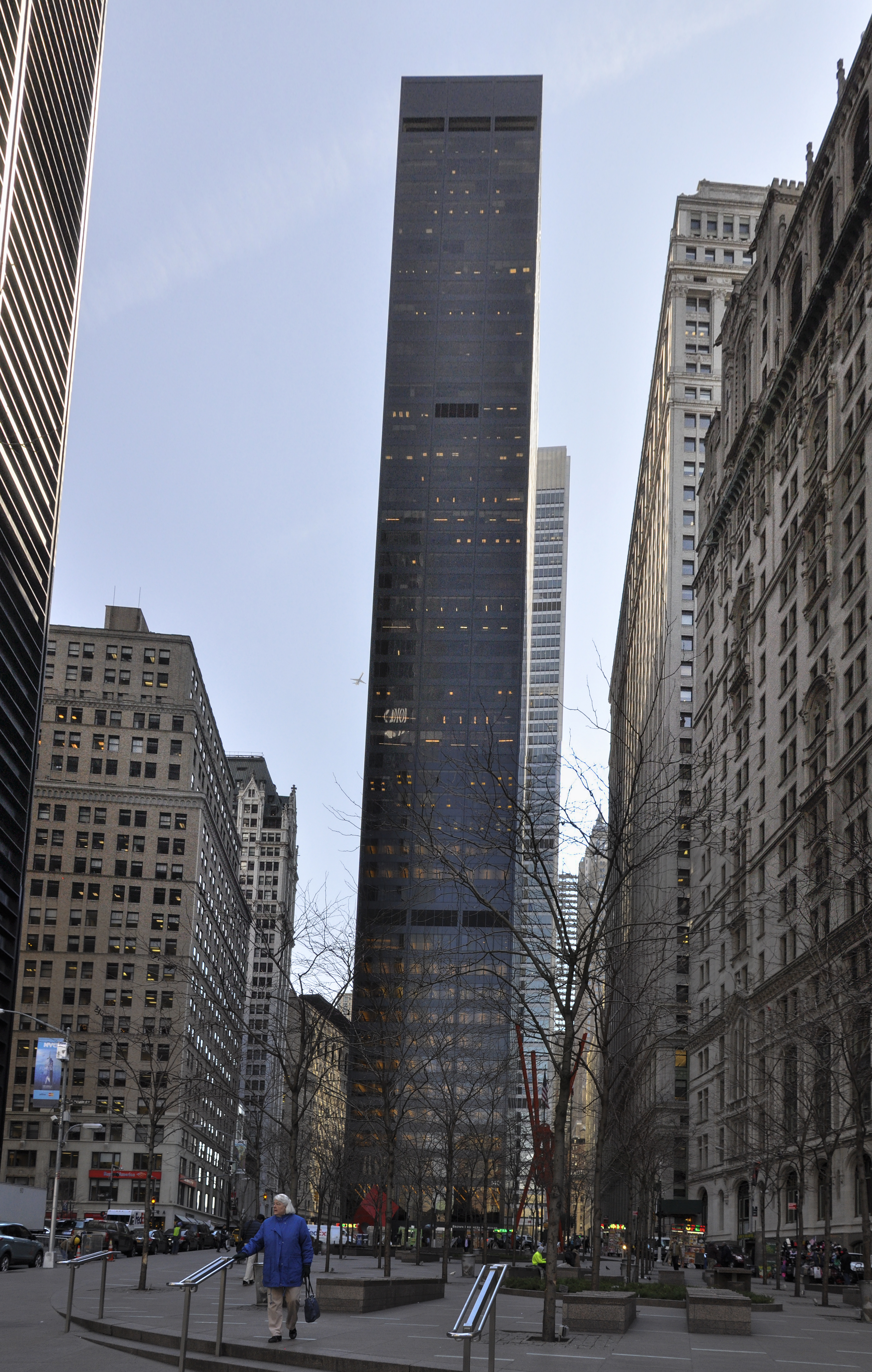
Viewed from Zuccotti Park to the west

In October 1965, Marine Midland Bank leased the two basements and the first 20 floors. Because the bank was the largest tenant at 140 Broadway, Helmsley's corporation gave the bank naming rights to the building. According to the bank's annual report for that year, 140 Broadway was to be the new headquarters of the bank. The second floor contained the main banking hall. By March 1967, the building was 90% rented. The Department of Buildings gave a temporary occupancy certificate that April, and certified the building as complete in October 1967. Other original tenants at the building included Clarke, Dodge Company; Delafield Delafield; Laird Company Corporation; and Control Data Corporation. Later tenants included Morgan Stanley, Paine Webber, Ernest & Ernest, the City Midday Club, Puerto Rico's government, and Helmsley's company Helmsley-Spear. In 1980, HSBC acquired a 51% controlling interest in the Marine Midland Corporation.

After Helmsley died in January 1997, his widow Leona Helmsley sold off over a dozen of his properties. The New York Times wrote that 140 Broadway had "attracted the most attention from prospective buyers": although the building was only 59% occupied and required renovations, real estate in the Financial District was highly sought. After several bids were received from six "serious finalists", the building was sold to Larry Silverstein's company Silverstein Properties for $190 million in January 1998. Subsequently, Silverstein undertook a $60 million renovation and leased out much of the remaining space. At the time, Silverstein harbored concerns that HSBC, which occupied 40% of the space, would move out once its lease expired in 2002. HSBC subsequently moved its primary headquarters to the HSBC Tower in Midtown Manhattan in 2001. Brown Brothers Harriman & Co. was then signed as 140 Broadway's major tenant, moving to 20 floors.

The building was purchased in 2004 by German firm Union Investment. On June 25, 2013, the New York City Landmarks Preservation Commission designated the Marine Midland Building as a New York City landmark. In January 2018, the building's owners proposed adding circular planters to the plaza, as well as adding "street furniture" on the sidewalk, which would potentially displace street vendors. Despite controversy over the plans, the Landmarks Preservation Commission approved the changes in March 2018. The designs for the renovated plaza called for planters to be installed on the section of the plaza on Liberty Street. By 2021, the building's owners were marketing Brown Brothers Harriman's space for rent; during that decade, the building gained tenants such as services firm Arup Group and law firm Lewis Brisbois Bisgaard & Smith. Union Investment hired Gensler to design an amenity space for the building, which was completed in 2025. The next year, the owners placed the building for sale at a price of $400 million.

== Incidents ==
=== Bombings ===
A bombing occurred on 140 Broadway's eighth floor on August 20, 1969, injuring 20 people. Police estimated the bomb to be the equivalent of 25 sticks of dynamite, making it among the city's strongest bomb blasts to date. The explosive was placed in a hallway just off the elevators some time during the evening and it exploded at around 10:30 pm. The injured were working on the night shift in the bank's stock bookkeeping department and were working on the other side of the corridor wall. The inside of this wall was lined with floor-to-ceiling automated file units that weighed 3 tons each and which absorbed most of the blast. Still, the blast moved the file units about a foot, blew out all the windows on that side of the building, and opened a 5-foot (1.5 m) hole in the reinforced concrete floor. The bomber, Sam Melville, was convicted of this and seven other 1969 Manhattan bombings and sentenced to 18 years in prison. He was killed by a state sharpshooter during the Attica Prison riot in September 1971. As a result of the bombing, the Marine Midland Company increased security.

In 1972, Ronald Kaufman made an unsuccessful attempt to bomb the building by hiding an explosive in a bank vault.

The building was again damaged in 1974, when Fuerzas Armadas de Liberación Nacional Puertorriqueña detonated a car bomb on the adjacent street. The bomb's force was equivalent to 40 sticks of dynamite and scattered debris for one and a half blocks.

=== Other incidents ===
On October 20, 1981, a fire occurred at 140 Broadway's 47th floor. When an elevator with five workers inside opened its doors on the 47th floor, the occupants were injured and had to manually seal the door. This prompted an investigation, which found that hundreds of New York City buildings' elevators did not have keys that enabled firefighters to navigate to specific floors. The elevators were supposed to have been upgraded as part of a 1973 law that mandated compliance with a new fire code, including upgrades to elevators that were activated by heat rather than automatically. The law had a deadline of September 1981, and after the fire at 140 Broadway, numerous landlords were given summonses for not complying with the new fire code.

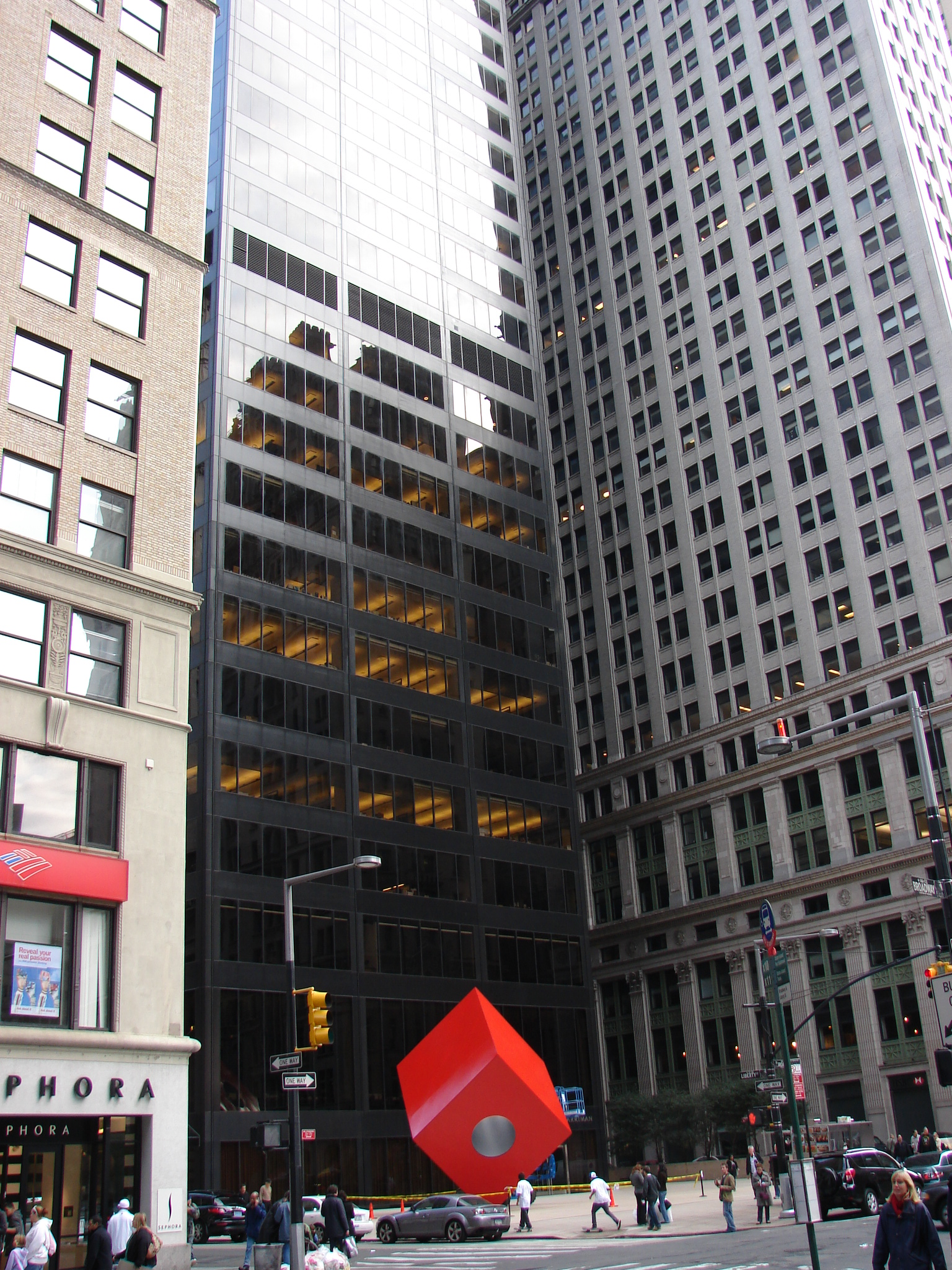
Seen from Liberty Street and Broadway; 140 Broadway is located behind the plaza containing The Cube. The Equitable Building is at right

In 1984, a disgruntled maintenance engineer removed parts of 140 Broadway's air-conditioning system, hiding key components. After the air-conditioning system had been disassembled for the winter, the engineer, Robert Rodriguez, dumped crucial components, including a steam-bearing case cover, thrust-bearing housing cover and several tapered dowels into a tank on the 37th floor, which served the building's sprinkler system. Some 10,000 personnel lost air-conditioning for several weeks, being "uncomfortably warm" until June 1984, when Rodriguez was arrested and the parts were retrieved by scuba divers.

== Reception ==
Reviews among architecture critics were largely positive. In 1968, Ada Louise Huxtable of The New York Times described 140 Broadway as "one of the handsomest [skyscrapers] in the city", enhanced by the inclusion of The Cube, and two years later, said that it was the "epitome of nineteen sixties sophisticated architectural elegance" contrasting with the Chamber of Commerce and One Liberty Plaza. Huxtable further stated in 1974 that 140 Broadway was "not only one of [the] buildings I admire most in New York, but that I admire most anywhere". Huxtable's successor at the Times, Paul Goldberger, said "the glass curtain wall is dark and refined, it is discreet", and ranked it as SOM's "best" New York City building. Goldberger later said that 140 Broadway probably had the "most beautiful glass 'skin' of any skyscraper in Manhattan". John Tauranac wrote that 140 Broadway was "Manhattan's most elegant tower", while John Morris Dixon, writing in Architectural Forum, said it was among "the handsomest office buildings in the U.S.A." Eric Nash said that the building was "one of the last, best expressions of modernist unity".

As early as 1996, architect Robert A. M. Stern had suggested that 140 Broadway was a viable candidate for official landmark status. Stern, in his book New York 1960 had said, "Its sleekly Modernist exteriors were an appropriate extension of the building's exterior minimalism", and had called The Cube one of the building's "most memorable aspects". The 2010 version of the AIA Guide to New York City characterized 140 Broadway as "a taut skin stretched over bare bones". 140 Broadway's design was widely imitated. In New York City, subsequent buildings that used a similar style included SOM's Solow Building and Emery Roth's 450 Park Avenue, as well as SOM's designs for 919 Third Avenue and 1166 Avenue of the Americas.

== See also ==
- List of New York City Designated Landmarks in Manhattan below 14th Street
- List of tallest buildings in New York City
