= Gordon Bunshaft =

American architect (1909–1990)

- Born: May 9, 1909; Buffalo, New York, US
- Died: August 6, 1990 (aged 81); New York City, US
- Education: Massachusetts Institute of Technology (BA, MA)
- Occupation: Architect
- Spouse: Nina Wayler (m. 1943)
- Awards: American Institute of Architects Twenty-five Year Award, elected to the National Institute of Arts and Letters, Pritzker Architecture Prize
- Practice: Skidmore, Owings & Merrill
- Buildings: Lever House, Beinecke Rare Book and Manuscript Library, Hirshhorn Museum and Sculpture Garden

Gordon Bunshaft FAIA (May 9, 1909 – August 6, 1990) was an American architect, a leading proponent of modern design in the mid-twentieth century. A partner in Skidmore, Owings & Merrill (SOM), Bunshaft joined the firm in 1937 and remained with it for more than 40 years. His notable buildings include Lever House in New York, the Beinecke Rare Book and Manuscript Library at Yale University, the Hirshhorn Museum and Sculpture Garden in Washington, D.C., the National Commercial Bank in Jeddah, Saudi Arabia, 140 Broadway (Marine Midland Grace Trust Co.), and Manufacturers Hanover Trust Branch Bank in New York, the first post-war "transparent" bank on the East Coast.

== Early life ==
Bunshaft was born in Buffalo, New York, to Russian Jewish immigrant parents, and attended Lafayette High School. His parents, David and Yetta, were first cousins who had immigrated to the United States a year prior to Gordon's birth. A sickly child, he "frequently drew while in bed," his New York Times obituary notes. "A doctor who admired his pictures of houses told his mother that her son should become an architect." He received both his undergraduate (1933) and his master's (1935) degrees from the Massachusetts Institute of Technology, then studied in Europe from 1935 to 1937 on a Rotch Traveling Scholarship and the MIT Honorary Traveling Fellowship.

== Career ==
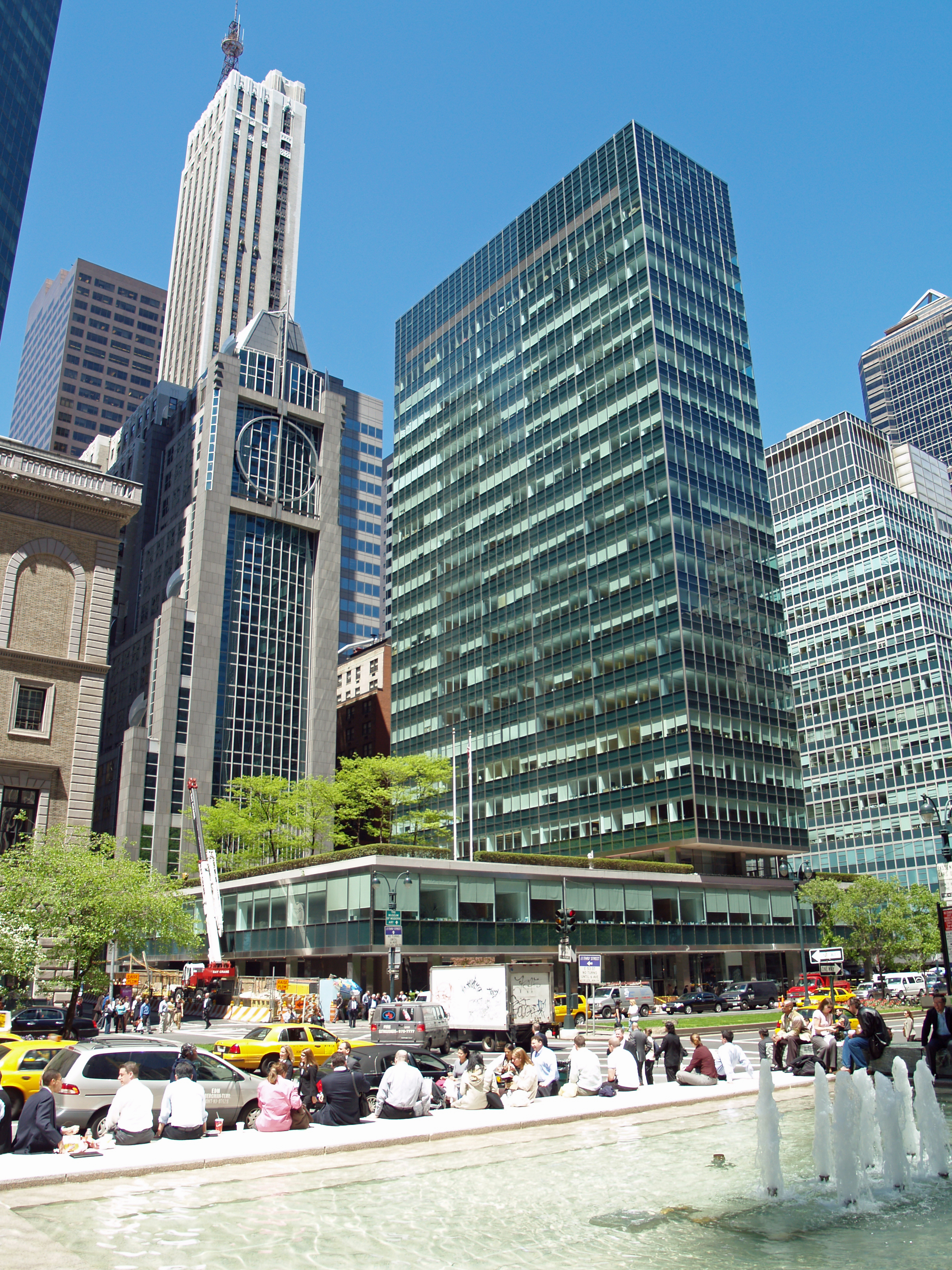
Lever House, New York City

After his traveling scholarships, Bunshaft worked briefly for Edward Durell Stone and the influential industrial designer Raymond Loewy. Reflecting on his brief stint ("about two or three months") with Loewy, Bunshaft told an interviewer for the Chicago Architects Oral History Project, "I didn’t like it there. Raymond Loewy was a phony. He’d put a gold line on a cigarette or on a railroad train, and he’d get a fee for it."

In 1937, he joined Skidmore, Owings & Merrill [SOM], where he remained for 42 years (with a hiatus for his service in the Army Corps of Engineers during World War II) until he retired in 1979. Bunshaft's early influences included Mies van der Rohe and Le Corbusier. "Mies was the Mondrian of architecture, and Le Corbusier was the Picasso," he told the Oral History interviewer.

After World War II, Bunshaft recalled, the cultural climate was well suited to his Miesian/Corbusian vision:

So in 1947, here you had these young men ready to go—a lot of them ready, a lot of them just getting into offices—and you had this boom of clients wanting to build buildings. It was easily more of a Golden Age than the Italian Renaissance with the Medicis. When I say clients, they were mostly corporations. The heads of them were men who wanted to build something that they’d be proud to have representing their company, whether it was a bank or whatever. In the corporations in those days, the head man was personally involved and personally building himself a palace for his people that would not only represent his company, but his personal pleasure. They were the new Medicis, and there were many of them. [T]hese people never questioned doing a modern building. They accepted modern architecture. ... I think the reason for that is that they wanted their company to be progressive.

First and foremost among the iconic modernist buildings he designed while at SOM is the renowned Lever House. Completed in 1952, it was New York's "first major commercial structure with a glass curtain-wall (only the United Nations Secretariat preceded it)," notes the architecture critic Paul Goldberger, "and it burst onto the stuffy, solid masonry wall of Park Avenue like a vision of a new world.”

Other memorable buildings by Bunshaft include the Manufacturers Trust Company Building (1954), the first bank building in the United States to be built in the International Style; the Pepsi-Cola Building (now 500 Park Avenue), completed in 1959; the Beinecke Rare Book and Manuscript Library at Yale University, completed in 1963; 140 Broadway (formerly known as the Marine Midland Building), topped out in 1966; the Lyndon Baines Johnson Library and Museum in Austin, Texas (1971); the Hirshhorn Museum and Sculpture Garden in Washington, D.C. (1974); and the National Commercial Bank in Jeddah, Saudi Arabia (1983).

In an interview for the Chicago Architects Oral History Project, Bunshaft reflected on the Beinecke. "I happen to love books, especially bindings and things, and I thought it ought to be a treasure house and it ought to express that by having a large number of beautiful books displayed behind glass," he told Betty J. Blum in 1990.

The structure would be covered with onyx and these big panels would be translucent onyx. It came from my seeing what I thought was onyx in a Renaissance-type palace in Istanbul. … The whole idea of onyx…is because books cannot be exposed to direct sunlight. … [Onyx] admits soft light, but no sunlight, so it’s like being in a cathedral. In ancient times, they used two materials, onyx and alabaster, for small windows. [When onyx of sufficient quality proved impossible to acquire, Bunshaft compromised on a stratum of white marble “that was translucent.”] When the sun pours in, it’s quite nice with the rich books.

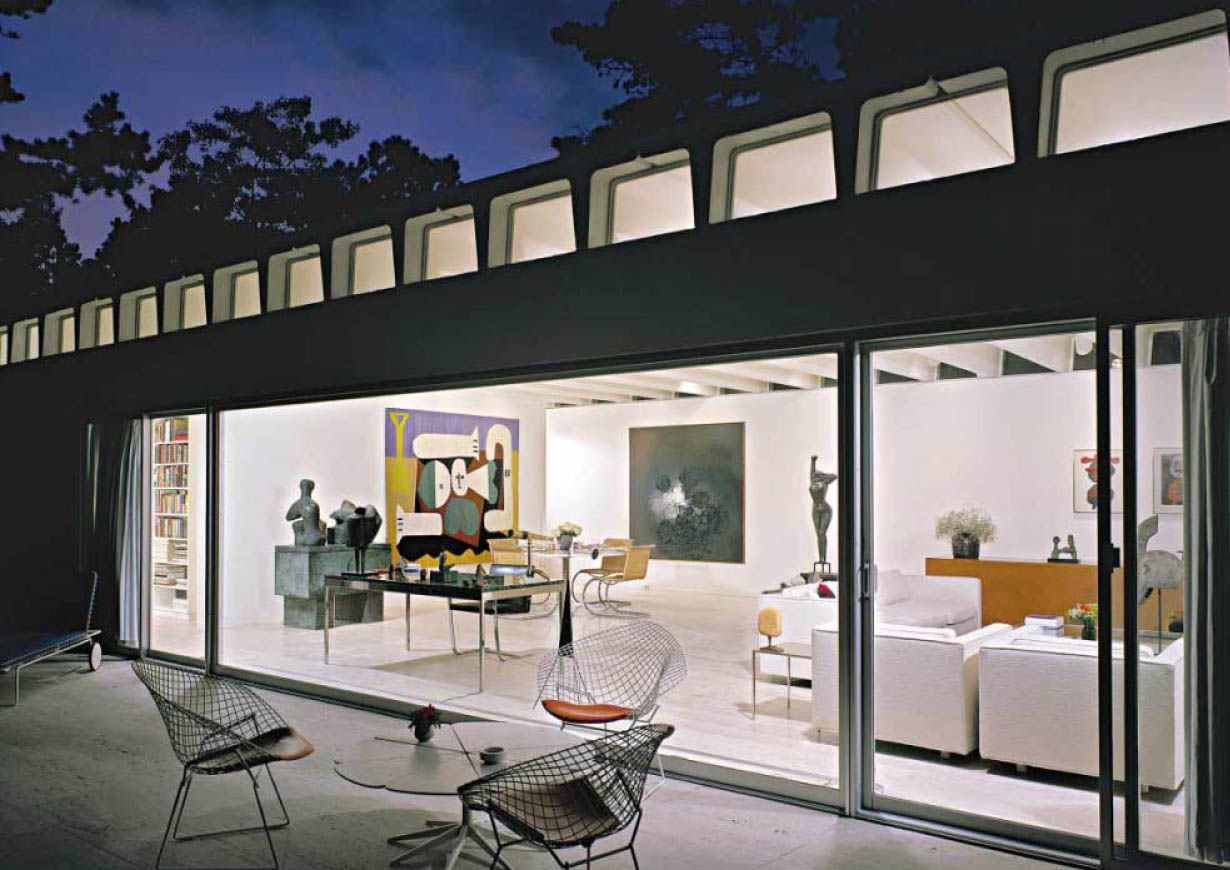
Bunshaft's only single-family residence, the Travertine House, later demolished

Bunshaft's only single-family residence was his own, the 2300-square-foot (210 m^{2}) Travertine House. On his death, he left the house to MoMA, which sold it to Martha Stewart in 1995. Stewart's extensive remodelling stalled amid an acrimonious planning dispute with a neighbour. In 2005, she sold the house to textile magnate Donald Maharam, who described the house as "decrepit and largely beyond repair" and had it demolished. The architectural historian Nicholas Adams, author of Gordon Bunshaft and SOM: Building Corporate Modernism, has lamented the demolition of the Bunshaft house as "the greatest loss" of all the architect's projects that have succumbed to the wrecking ball. "[He] and his wife Nina ... never had children and so their home was not designed for a family so much as it was for art," said Adams, in a 2019 interview. "It had his Miròs, Picassos, Moores, and Dubuffets and was surrounded by a remarkable landscape created by [Skidmore, Owings & Merrill’s] Joanna Diman."

=== Awards and honors ===
Bunshaft was elected to the National Institute of Arts and Letters and was the recipient of numerous other honors and awards. In 1955, he received the Brunner Prize of the American Academy and Institute of Arts and Letters and, in 1984, its gold medal. He also received the American Institute of Architects Twenty-five Year Award for Lever House in 1980 and in 1988 the Pritzker Architecture Prize. In 1958, he was elected to the National Academy of Design as an Associate and became a full member in 1959. From 1963 to 1972, he was a member of the Commission of Fine Arts in Washington, D.C.

Upon receiving the Pritzker Prize in 1988, for which he had nominated himself, the terse architect gave the shortest speech of any winner in the award's history:

In 1928, I entered the MIT School of Architecture and started my architectural trip. Today, 60 years later, I've been given the Pritzker Architecture Prize for which I thank the Pritzker family and the distinguished members of the selection committee for honoring me with this prestigious award. It is the capstone of my life in architecture. That's it.

Bunshaft was a trustee of the Museum of Modern Art. He also received the Medal of Honor of the New York Chapter of the American Institute of Architects.

== Style ==
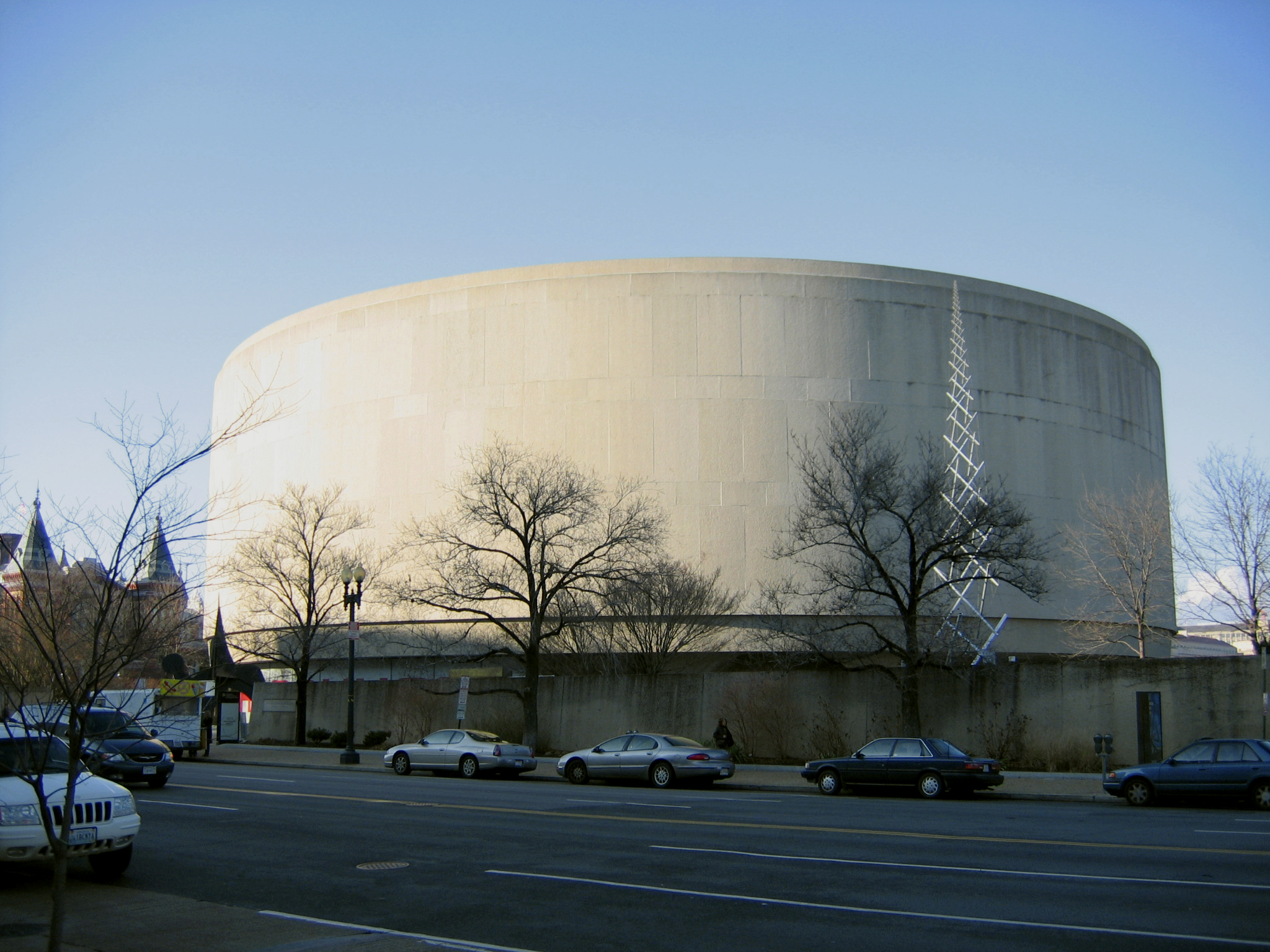
Exterior of the Hirshhorn Museum, facing Independence Avenue

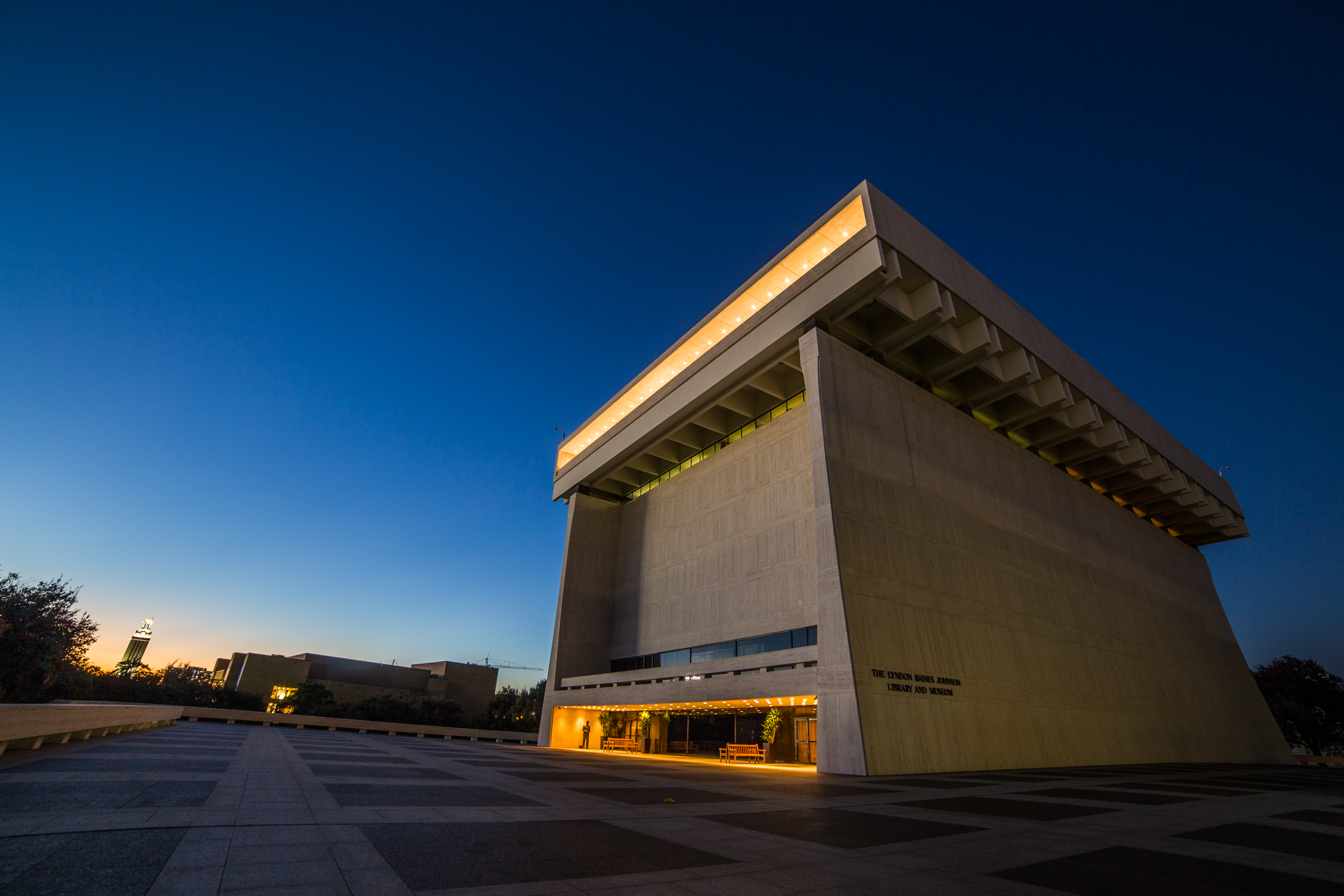
The LBJ Presidential Library in Austin, Texas

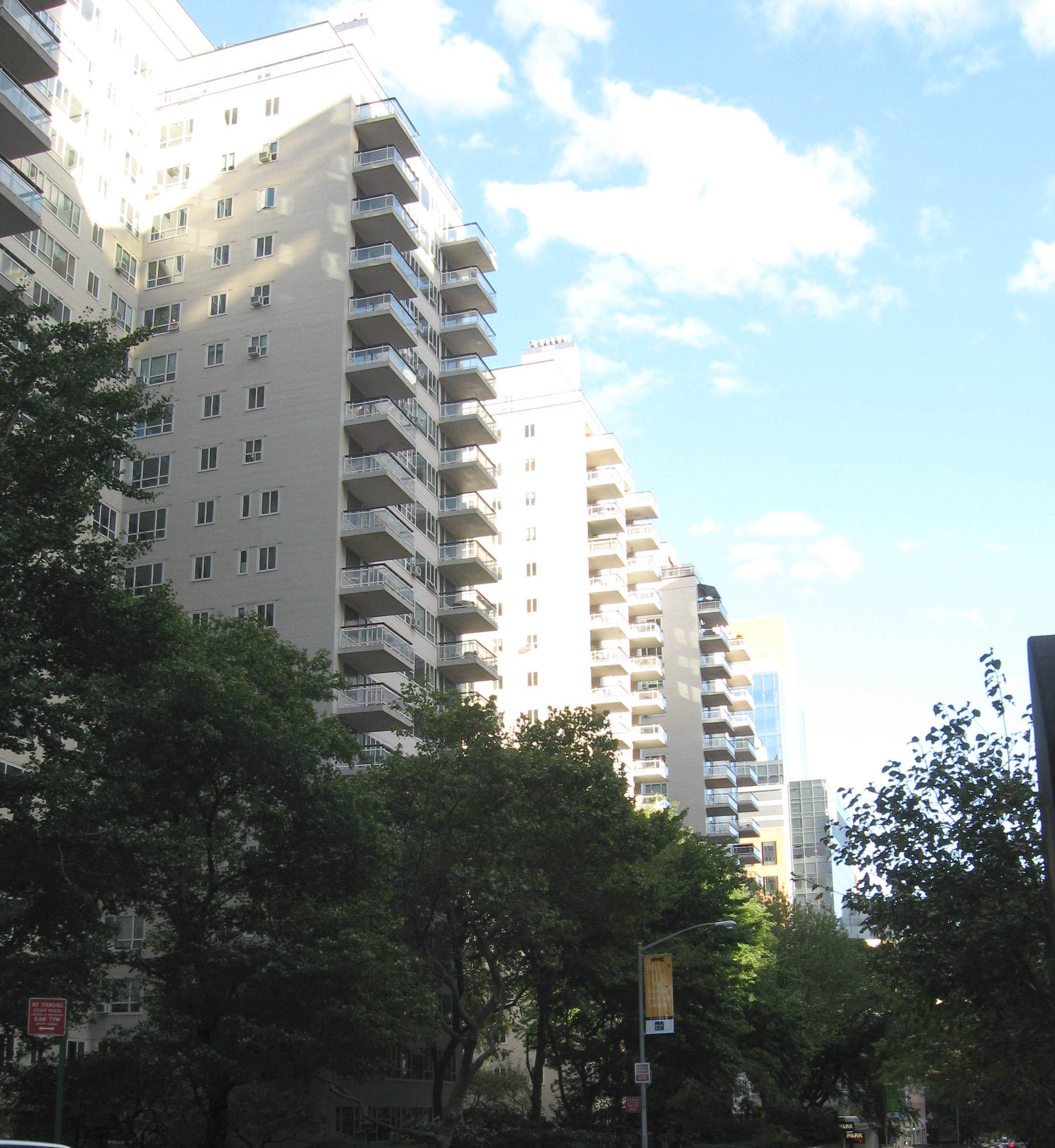
Manhattan House on the Upper East Side

Bunshaft's biography page on the Pritzker Prize website lauds the architect for "opening a whole new era of skyscraper design with his first major design project in 1952, the 24-story Lever House in New York."

Many consider it the keystone of establishing the International Style as corporate America's standard in architecture, at least through the 1970s. In recent years, it has been declared a historic landmark, New York's most contemporary structure to hold that distinction. The late Lewis Mumford described Lever House...in glowing terms, "It says all that can be said, delicately, accurately, elegantly, with surfaces of glass, with ribs of steel...an impeccable achievement."

Throughout the 1960s and 1970s, his style became more sculptural, such as Yale's Beinecke Library:

The interior is as much like a religious building as like a library. [I]n buildings like the travertine-clad Johnson Library, Mr. Bunshaft seemed to be striving even harder for effect, and the result seemed more like a mausoleum. But he closed his career with a final skyscraper, a 27-story triangular office tower of travertine for the National Commercial Bank in Jeddah with huge loggias that he called 'gardens in the air.' It was an aggressively sculptural but brilliantly inventive project that ended Mr. Bunshaft's active years on a note of high creativity.

A staunch modernist to the end, he was implacably hostile to postmodern architecture, which he regarded as flouting the timeless laws of logic and proportion that in his view governed all architecture, ancient and modern alike, while at the same time indulging "arbitrary whimsy" rather than responding to its times:

[B]ehind it all [i.e., all architecture] is logic. That’s why, in my opinion, postmodern junk that’s being built is a joke. It’s arbitrary and hasn’t a damn thing to do with our times. It’s an insult to history, because the people who do this postmodern stuff don’t really know [history]. … [T]here’s no rationale for it. All great architecture through all history from Persia to Egypt to anyplace, the great structures are all logical for their use and for the structural method and for their materials. There’s no arbitrary whimsy. ... What makes a guy get up one morning and suddenly decide to do Italiano columns and stuff in a plaza in New Orleans?

== Legacy ==
Bunshaft's personal papers are held by the Department of Drawings & Archives in the Avery Architectural and Fine Arts Library at Columbia University; his architectural drawings remain with SOM.

== Buildings ==
- 1942 – Great Lakes Naval Training Center, Hostess House – Great Lakes, Illinois
- 1951 – Lever House – New York City
- 1951 – Sedgwick Houses – New York City
- 1952 – Manhattan House – New York City
- 1953 – Manufacturers Trust Company Building – New York City
- 1956 – Ford World Headquarters – Dearborn, Michigan, with Natalie de Blois
- 1956 – Consular Agency of the United States, Bremen – Bremen, Germany
- 1957 – Connecticut General Life Insurance Company Headquarters – Bloomfield, Connecticut
- 1955 – Istanbul Hilton – Istanbul, Turkey, with Sedad Hakkı Eldem
- 1958 – Reynolds Metals Company International Headquarters – Richmond, Virginia
- 1960 – 500 Park Avenue (Pepsi-Cola Company World Headquarters) – New York City
- 1961 – 28 Liberty Street (Chase Manhattan Bank) – New York City
- 1962 – CIL House – Montreal, Quebec
- 1962 – Albright-Knox Art Gallery addition – Buffalo, New York
- 1963 – Travertine House – East Hampton, New York
- 1963 – Beinecke Library – Yale University, New Haven, Connecticut
- 1965 – American Republic Insurance Company Headquarters – Des Moines, Iowa
- 1965 – Banque Lambert – Brussels, Belgium
- 1965 – Heinz Corporate Headquarters – Hillingdon, England
- 1965 – New York Public Library for the Performing Arts (interiors) – New York City
- 1965 – Hayes Park Central & South Buildings – Hayes, United Kingdom
- 1965 – Warren P. McGuirk Alumni Stadium – University of Massachusetts, Amherst, Massachusetts
- 1967 – 140 Broadway – New York City
- 1970 – American Can Company Headquarters – Greenwich, Connecticut
- 1971 – Lyndon Baines Johnson Library and Museum – Austin, Texas
- 1972 – Carborundum Center – Niagara Falls, New York
- 1972 – Carlton Centre – Johannesburg, South Africa
- 1973 – New York City Convention and Exhibition Center (not built) – New York City
- 1973 – Uris Hall, Cornell University – Ithaca, New York
- 1974 – Solow Building – 9 West 57th Street, New York City
- 1974 – W. R. Grace Building – New York City
- 1974 – Hirshhorn Museum and Sculpture Garden – Washington, D.C.
- 1983 – National Commercial Bank – Jeddah, Saudi Arabia

== Gallery ==
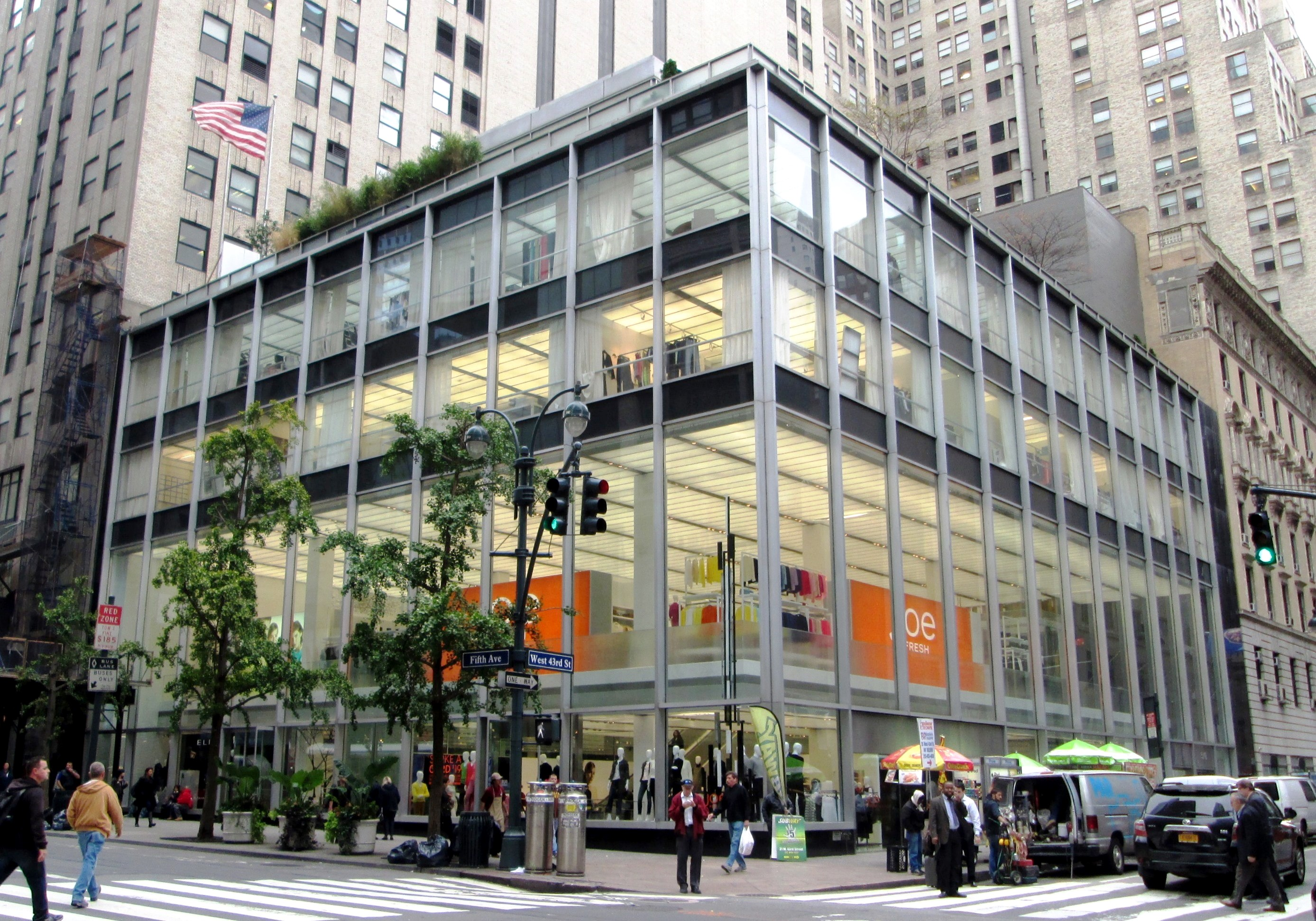
Manufacturers Trust Building
New York City 1954

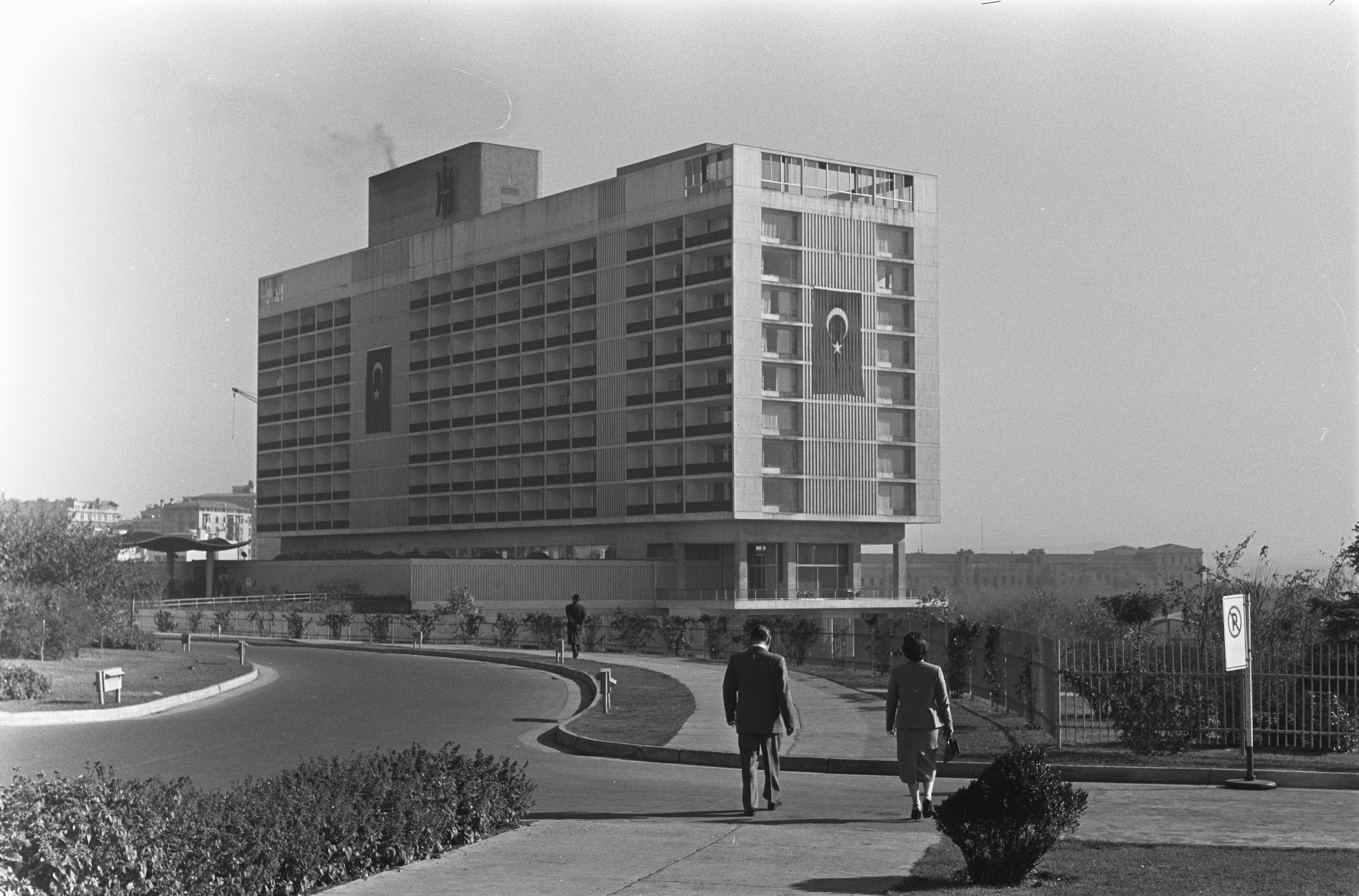
Istanbul Hilton
Istanbul, Turkey, 1955, with Sedad Hakkı Eldem

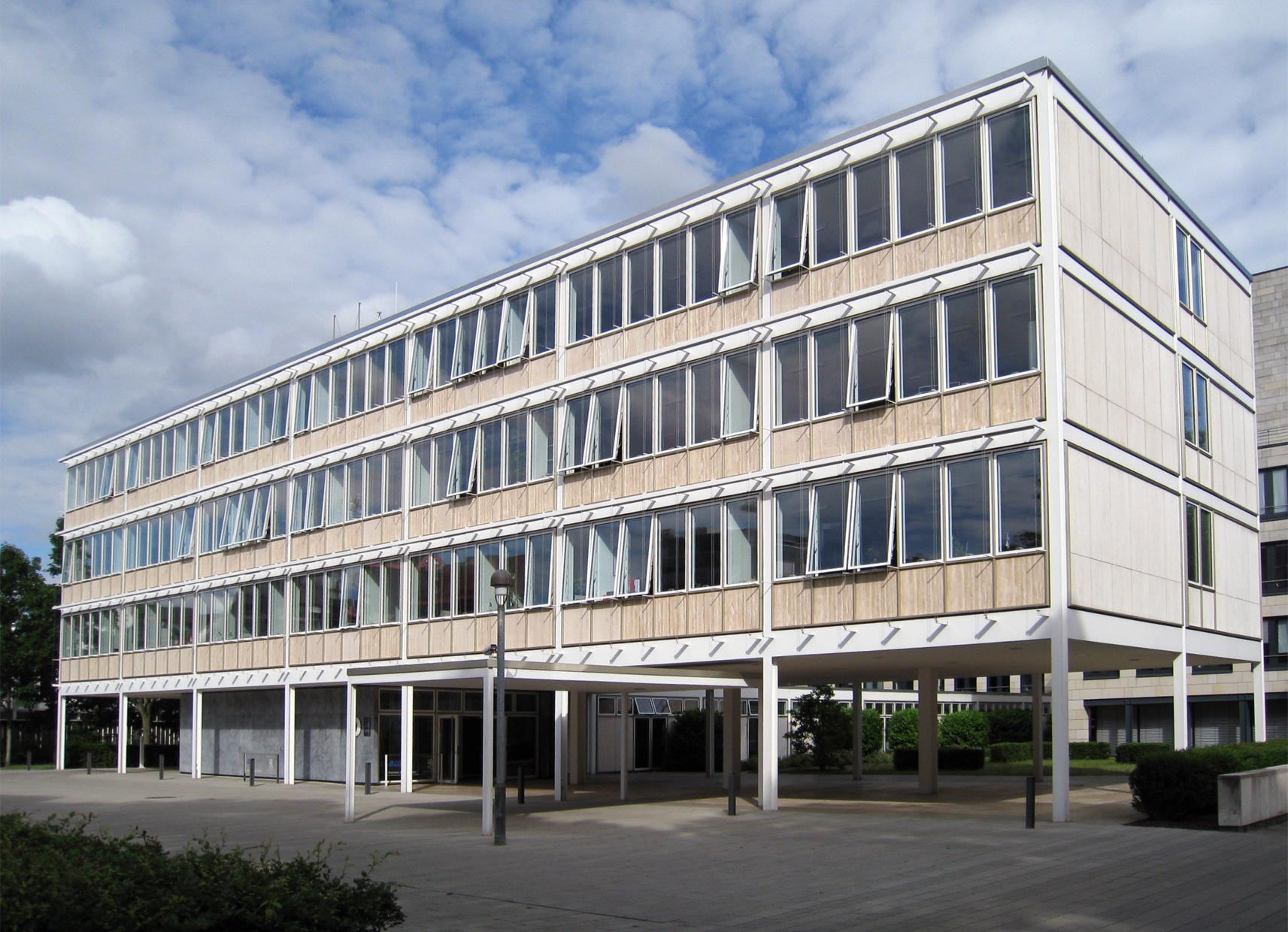
United States Consular Agency
Bremen, Germany 1956

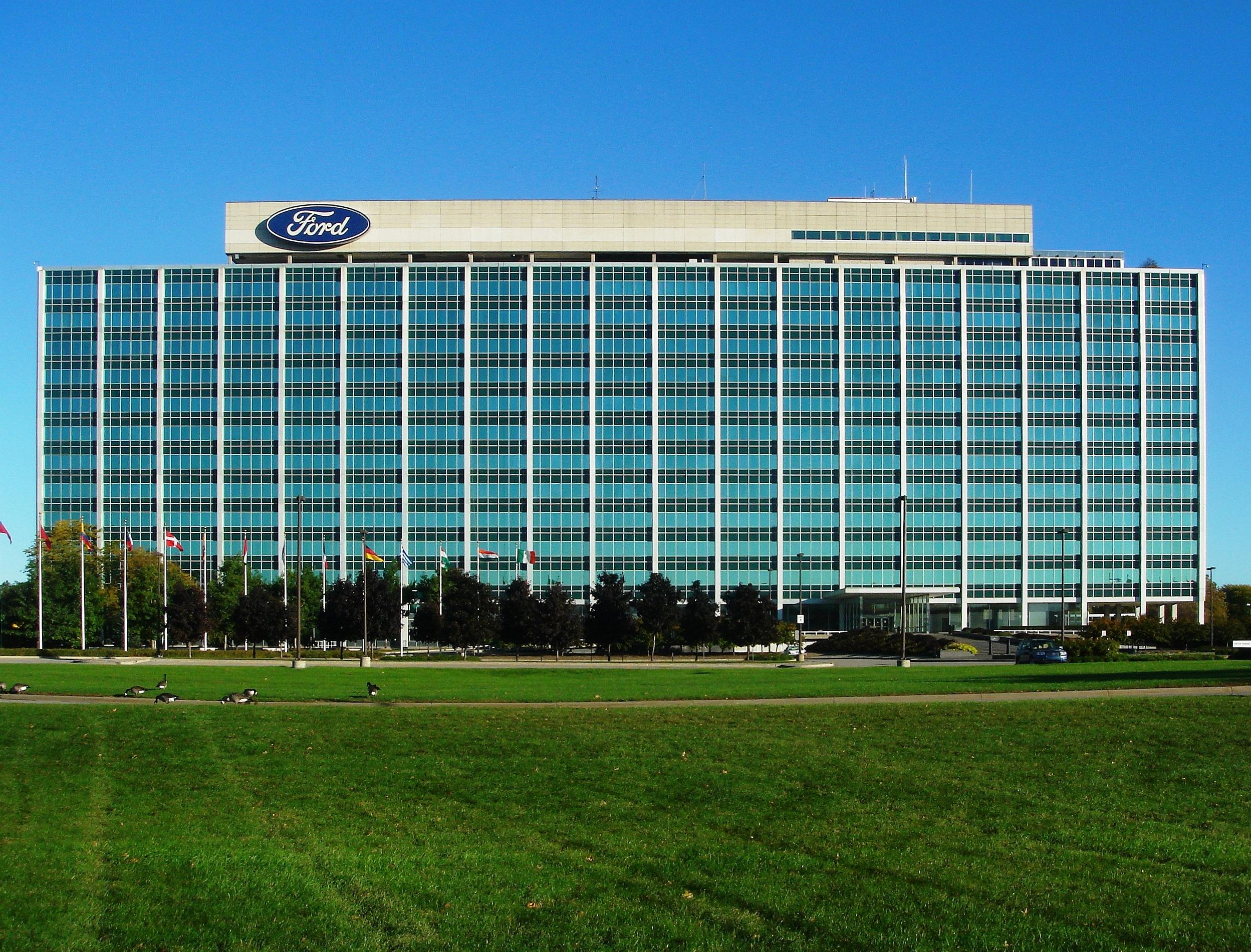
Ford World Headquarters
Dearborn, Michigan 1956

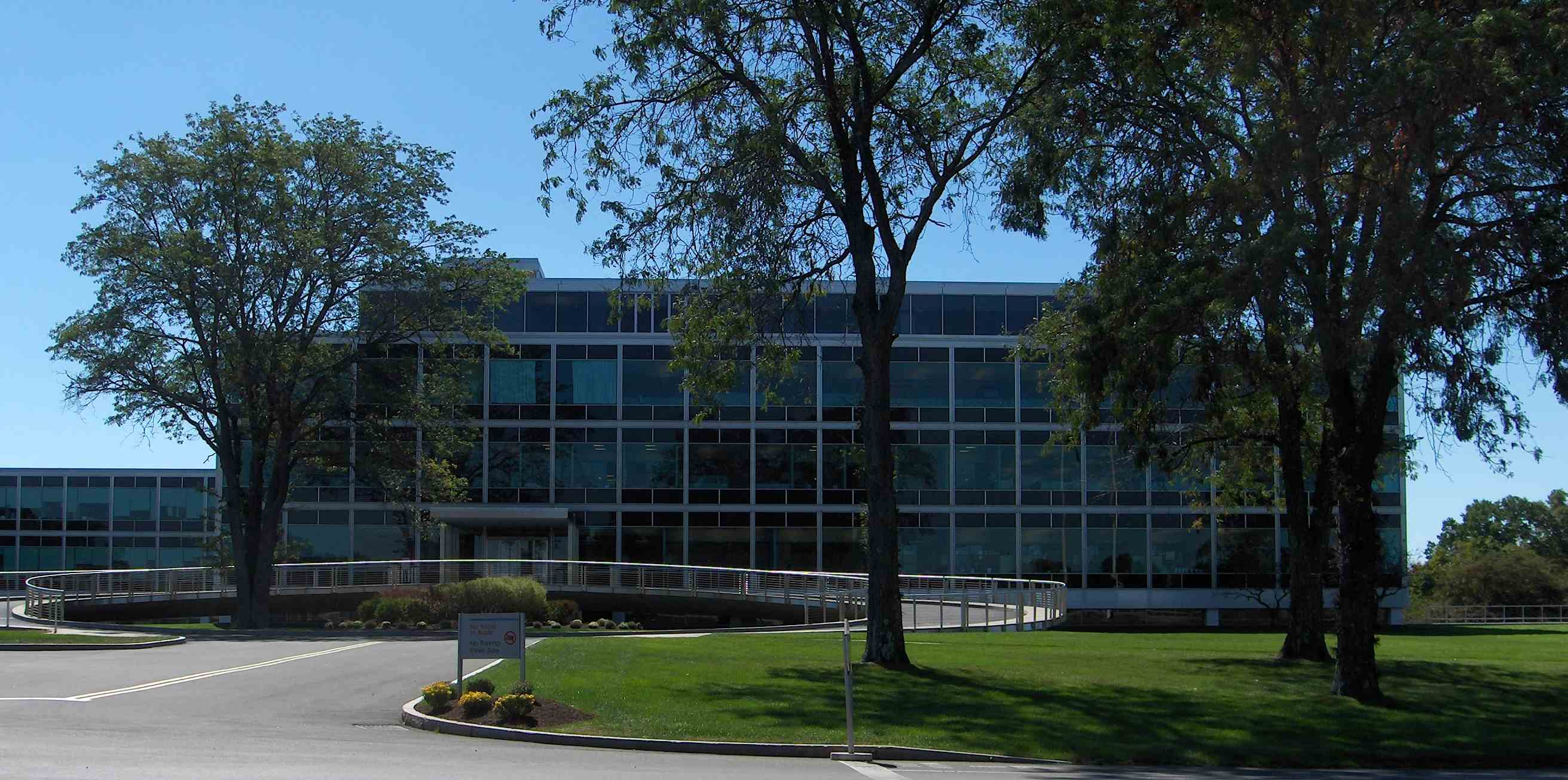
Connecticut General Life Insurance Headquarters
Bloomfield, CT 1957

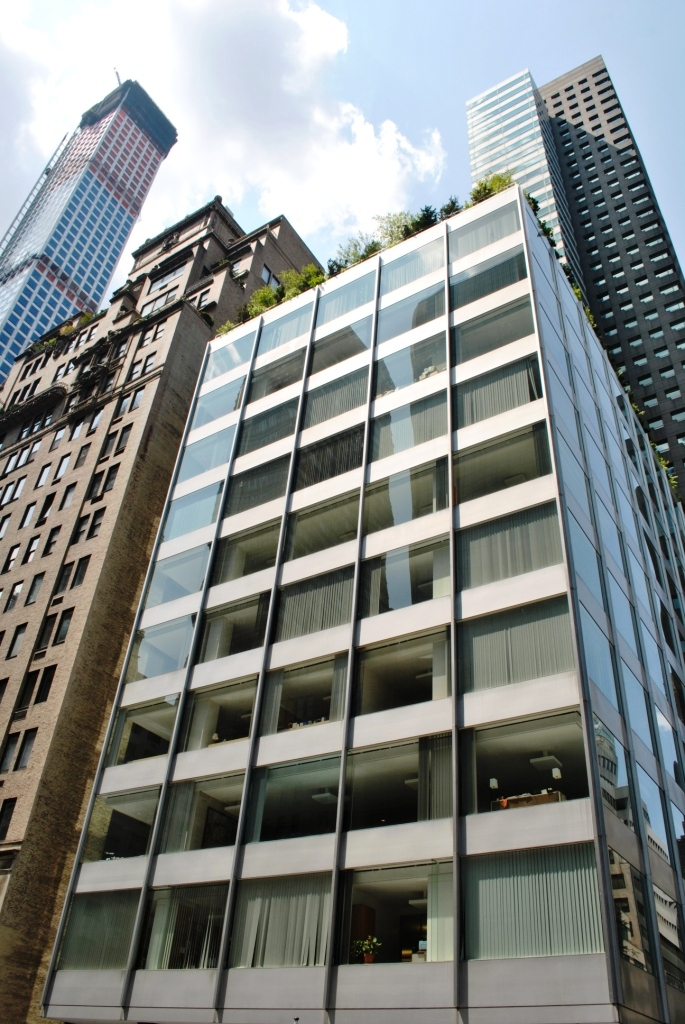
Pepsi-Cola Headquarters
New York City 1960

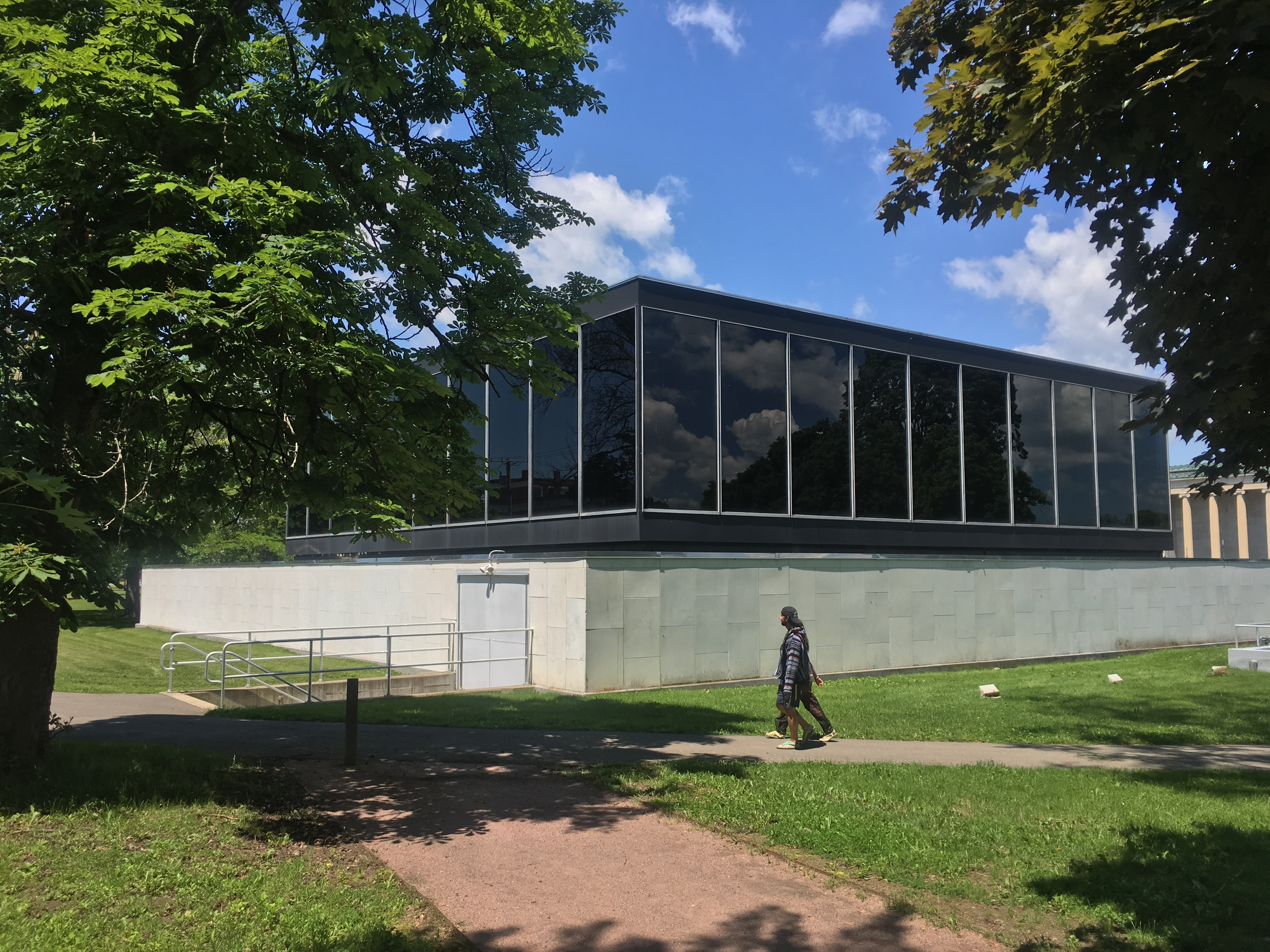
Albright-Knox Art Gallery, Buffalo, New York 1962

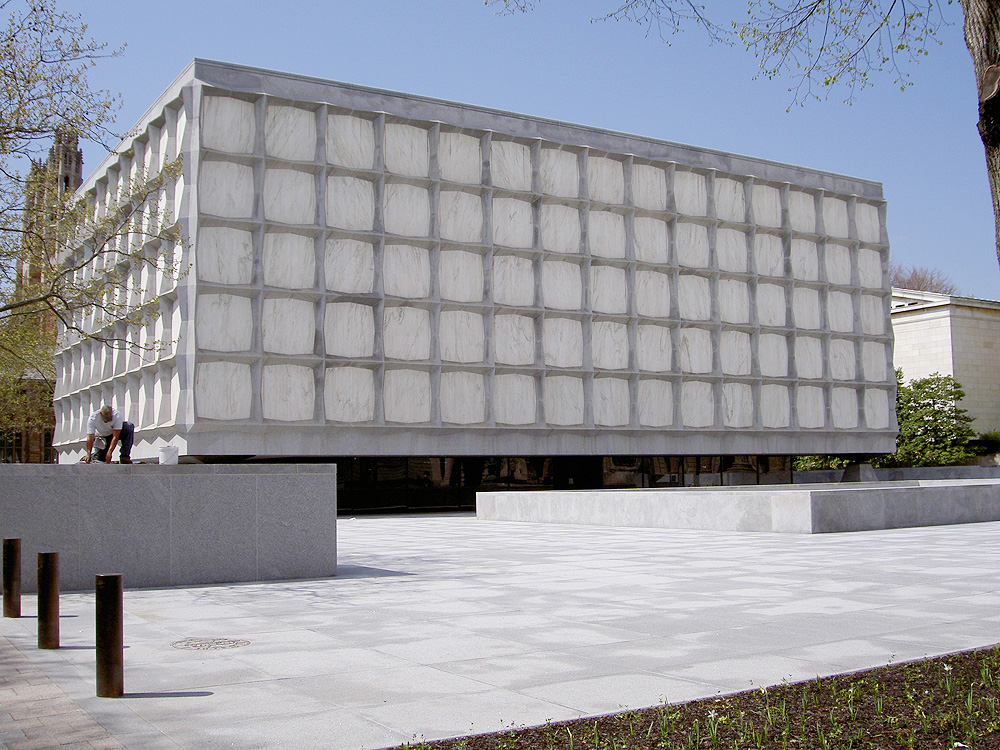
Beinecke Library
Yale University, New Haven, CT 1963

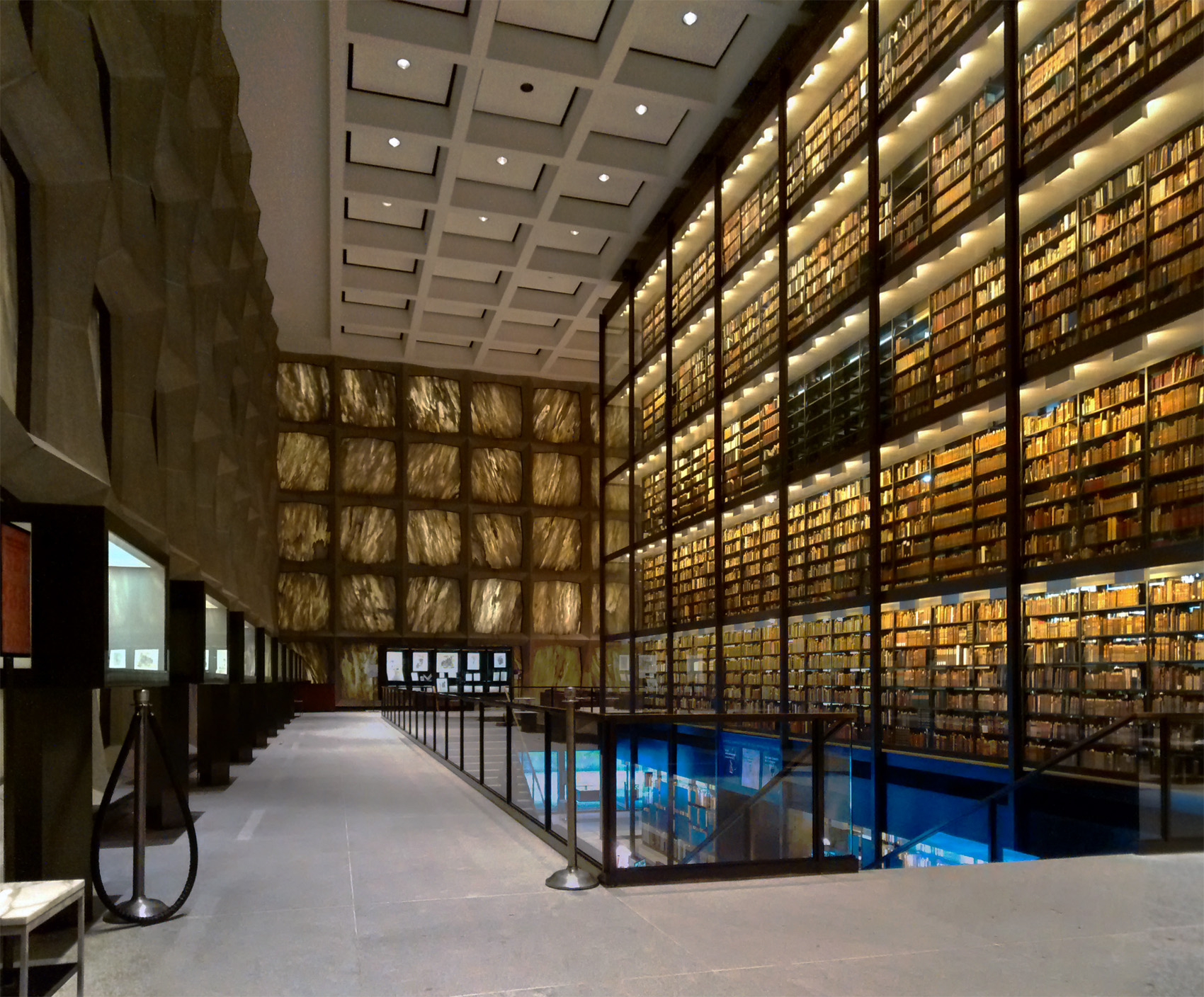
Beinecke Library Interior
Yale University, New Haven, CT 1963

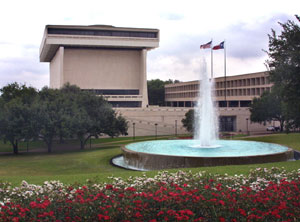
Johnson Presidential Library
Austin, Texas, 1971

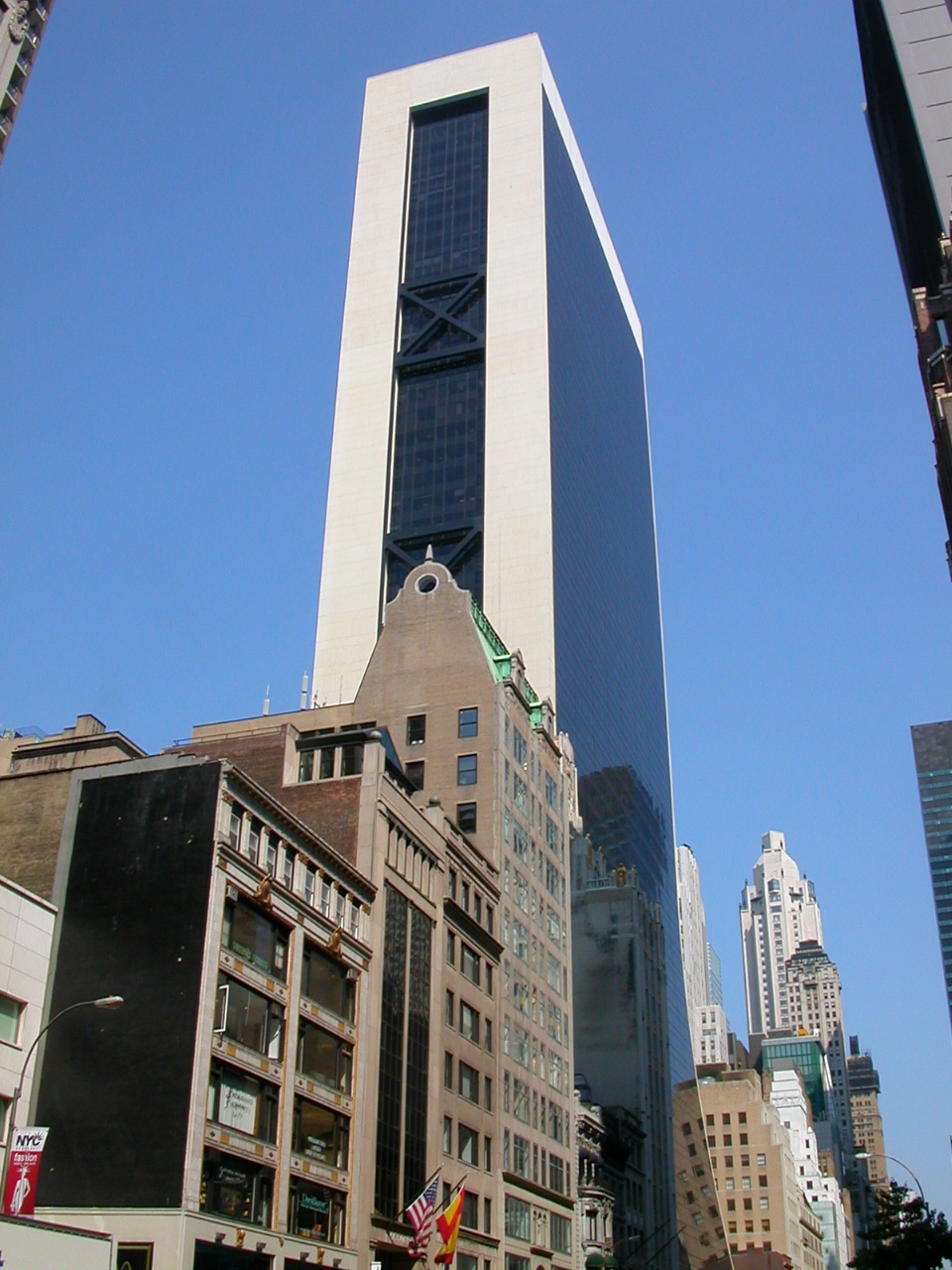
Solow Building
New York, 1974

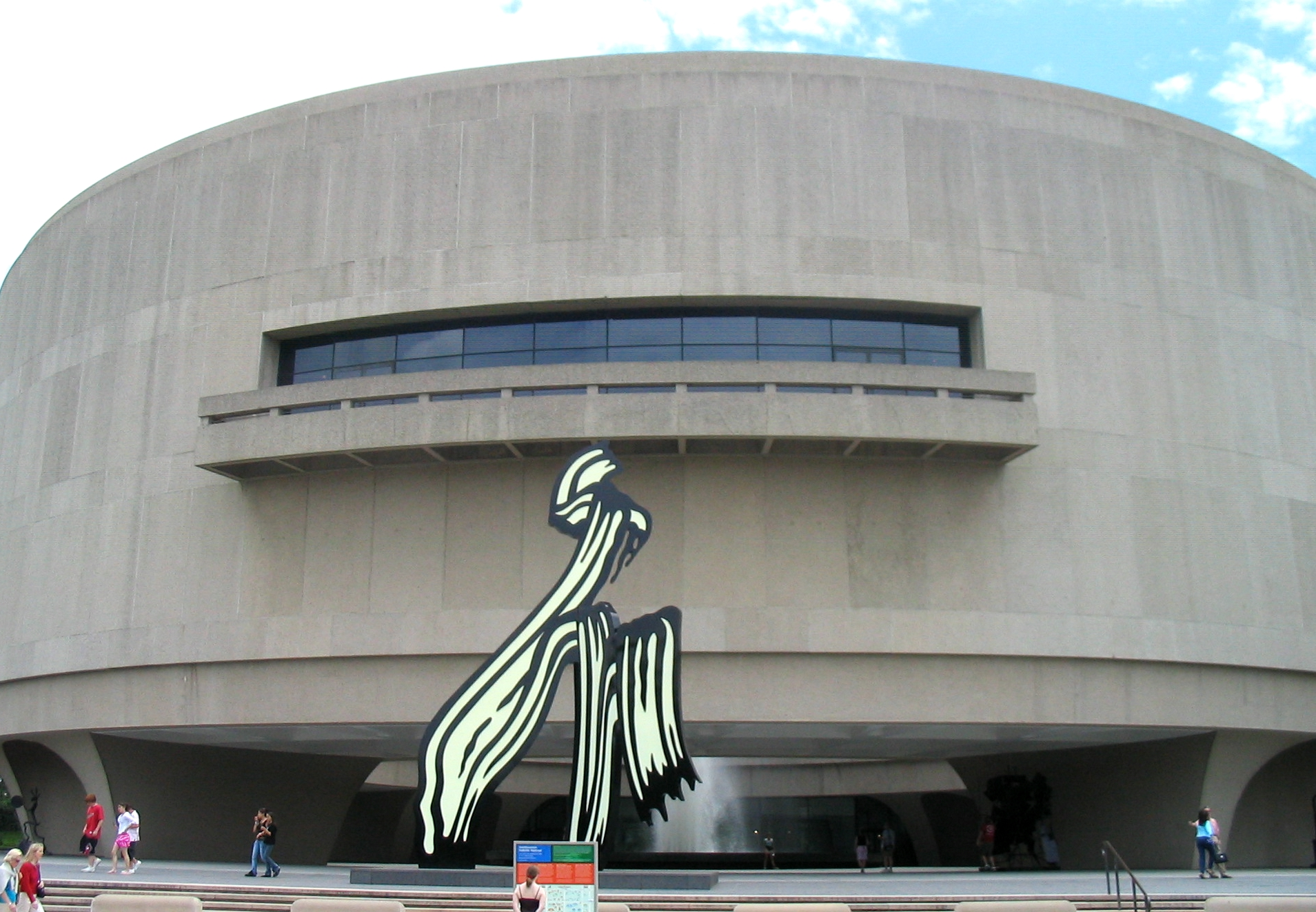
Hirshhorn Museum
Washington, D.C. 1974

== Personal life ==
In 1943, Bunshaft married Nina Wayler (d. 1994). Avid collectors of contemporary art, the couple owned many major pieces, including works by Joan Miró, Dubuffet, Giacometti, Léger and Noguchi. They lived in the Manhattan House Apartments on New York's Upper East Side, which Bunshaft helped design, and at the Travertine House in East Hampton. He died of cardiovascular arrest in 1990, at the age of 81, and is buried next to his wife and parents in the Temple Beth El cemetery on Pine Ridge Road in Cheektowaga, New York.

Nicholas Adams, the architectural historian and author of Gordon Bunshaft and SOM: Building Corporate Modernism, characterizes Bunshaft as "gruff, grumpy, crude, and stubborn," noting, "When pressed about his architecture, he offered staccato descriptive explanations. At dinner parties he would turn his back (and rotate his chair) so that he wouldn’t have to talk to an unappealing neighbor. 'I suppose you do that postmodernist shit,' he reportedly told a young employee recently moved to SOM’s New York office from Washington, D.C. He joked that the only reason his name was not on the masthead at SOM was that the initials would be S.O.B."

Yet Adams discovered, in Bunshaft's private correspondence with artists whose work he admired a more vulnerable side of Bunshaft. "His extensive correspondence with [Henry Moore and Jean Dubuffet], preserved at the Avery Library, is both playful and witty, describing cheerful conversations, and looking forward to further jovial meetings," says Adams. "In November 1972, he wrote tenderly to Dubuffet after the installation of his Group of Three Trees in front of Chase Manhattan in New York: 'I enjoyed your visit here tremendously. I felt that although I have known you, off and on, for many years, this is the first time we really became closer.'"

A man of few words, he famously said he wanted his buildings to speak for themselves.

== Bibliography ==
- Carol Herselle Krinsky, Gordon Bunshaft of Skidmore, Owings & Merrill, MIT Press, 1988
- Nicholas Adams, Gordon Bunshaft and SOM: Building Corporate Modernism, Yale University Press, 2019
