= Sedgwick Houses =

- NYCHA Property
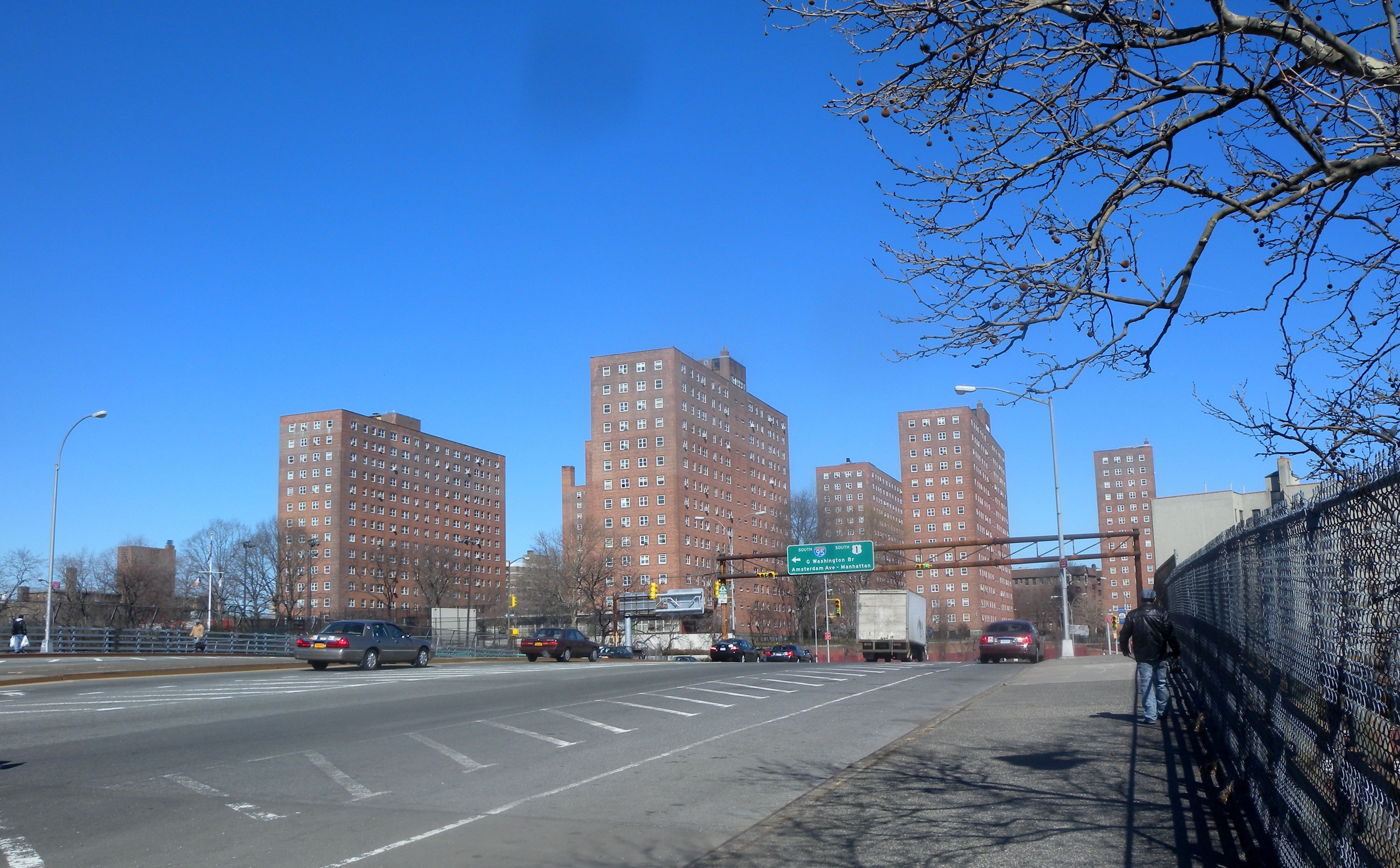
- Interactive map of Sedgwick Houses
- Country: United States
- State: New York
- City: New York City
- Borough: Bronx

Area
  - Total: 7.27 acres (2.94 ha)

Population
  - Total: 1,445
- Zip code: 10453

The Sedgwick Houses is a housing complex that is owned by New York City Housing Authority (NYCHA) that has seven buildings. Buildings I, II, and IV-VII have 14 stories while Building III has 15 stories. They are located between Undercliff and University Avenues and in front of West 174th Street in the Morris Heights neighborhood of the Bronx borough in New York City.

== History ==
The project was approved by the City Planning Commission and the Board of Estimate in June 1948. Construction began in March 1949. This housing complex was completed in March 1951. It was designed by Gordon Bunshaft of Skidmore, Owings & Merrill.

=== 21st century ===
In around 2022, The SUPERSTRUCTURES company provided investigation, design, and the construction to repaint and replace the ballasted roofing systems with liquid-applied systems and replacements to many others like railing, door saddle and hardware, cast stone, and window and door sealants.

== See also ==
- New York City Housing Authority
