= Bunshaft Residence =

House in East Hampton, New York

Coordinates: 40.938156°N 72.229614°W

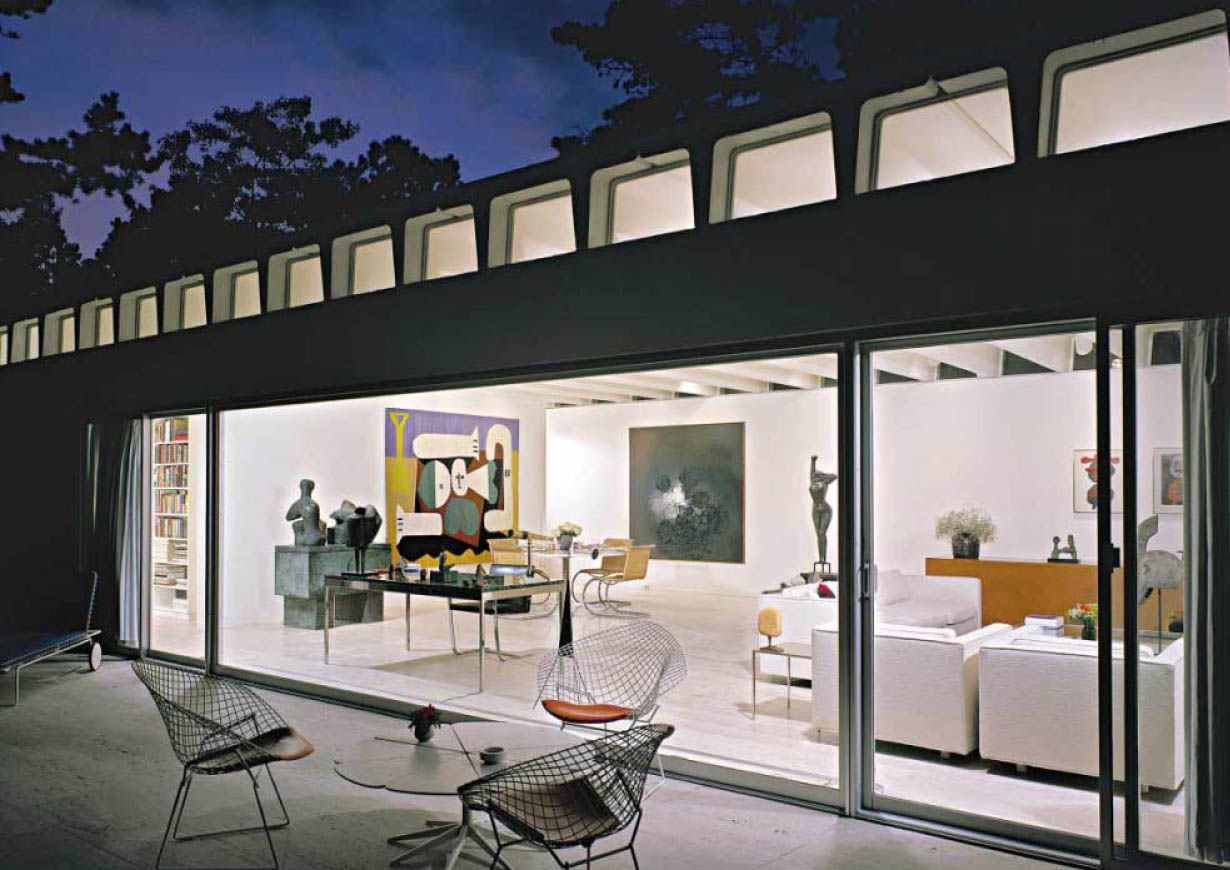

The Bunshaft Residence, sometimes called the Travertine House was a modernist home designed by architect Gordon Bunshaft for himself and his wife on a 2.4-acre (0.97 ha) lot on the shore of Georgica Pond in East Hampton, New York. It was designed in 1962 and completed in 1963. It was one of the few residences designed by Bunshaft.

== Design ==
The house was contained within a rectangular box, 100 feet (30.5 m) long by 26 feet (7.9 m) wide, with its long dimension tangent to the lagoon's shoreline to the south and raised on a broad six-foot berm above the floodplain. The exterior walls were poured-in-place concrete clad with travertine and the exposed roof structure was made up of pre-stressed concrete beams with a "double T" shape, exposed on either edge with the openings filled with plate glass clerestory windows. The ends of the house were shaded by a 4-foot (1.2 m) extension of the roof and side walls with a paved strip extending the stone flooring to the edge of the walls.

The main living spaces had floor-to-ceiling plate glass openings. Interior walls were white-painted plaster and the floors were travertine over a concrete slab foundation. The entry door, one of only two openings in the solid north wall, opened directly into a small entry hall between the central living room and the master bedroom. Opposite the open living area was a smaller guest bedroom and a study, separated from the living space by a U-shaped kitchen and the guest bath.

=== Art ===
The Bunshafts decorated their retreat primarily in off-whites with natural wood and glass and occasional red accents. Lighting was designed to highlight their art collection which included works by Pablo Picasso, Le Corbusier, Jack Youngerman, and Henry Moore as well as rocks with faces painted on them by Mrs Bunshaft.

=== Sale ===
When Bunshaft's widow, Nina Wayler, died in 1994, the house and its artworks were willed to the Museum of Modern Art in New York City. The Museum stripped the house of its valuable artwork and then sold the property, without any covenants or restrictions, to Martha Stewart for $3.2 million. In the 1990s, she commissioned a renovation by Minimalist British architect John Pawson, for which interior demolition was begun but the project stalled, reportedly, in part, due to a dispute with her neighbor, developer Harry Macklowe. Around the time that Stewart was embroiled in unrelated legal difficulties that resulted in a prison sentence, she transferred the property to her daughter, Alexis, who in turn sold it to Donald Maharam in 2004 for $9.5 million. He demolished it in July 2004 for construction of a new house by his son-in-law, David Pill.
