= American Republic Insurance Company Headquarters Building =

- U.S. National Register of Historic Places
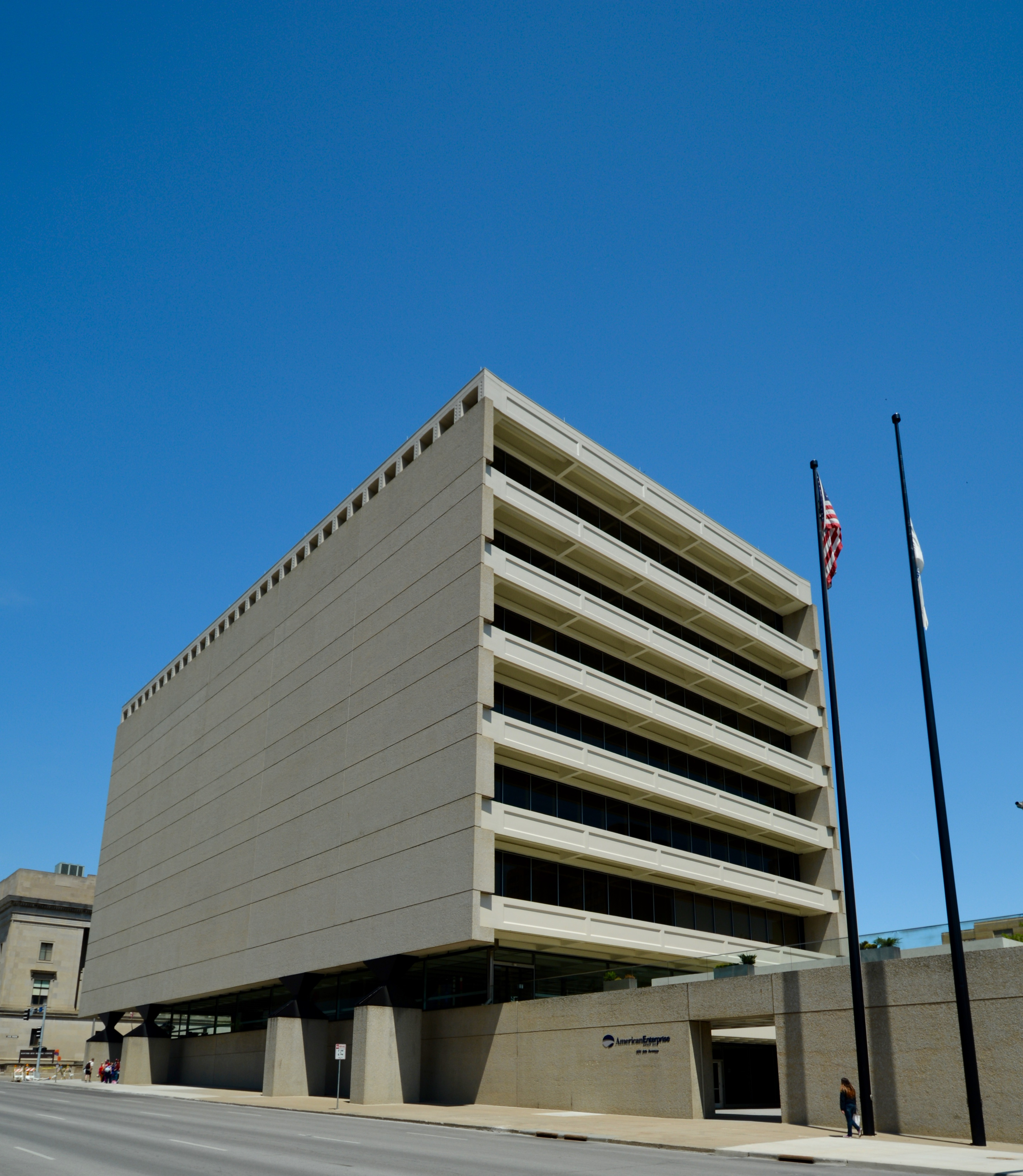

- Location within Iowa Location within the United States
- Location: 601 6th Ave. Des Moines, Iowa
- Coordinates: 41°35′24.6″N 93°37′31.1″W
- Area: less than one acre
- Built: 1965
- Architect: Gordon Bunshaft
- Architectural style: Modernist
- NRHP reference No.: 15000917
- Added to NRHP: December 22, 2015

The American Republic Insurance Company Headquarters Building is a historic building located in downtown Des Moines, Iowa, United States. It was completed in 1965 for the insurance company's headquarters and it continues to serve that purpose. It was listed on the National Register of Historic Places in 2015.

== Architecture ==
It was designed by the prominent New York architect Gordon Bunshaft of the architectural firm Skidmore, Owings & Merrill LLP. The Modernist building has no windows on its east and west elevations. The windows on the north and south elevations allow in daylight and keep out radiant heat. The eight-story building rises to the height of 107.34 feet (32.72 m).
