= National Museum of the American Sailor =

National Museum of the American Sailor (formerly the Great Lakes Naval Museum)

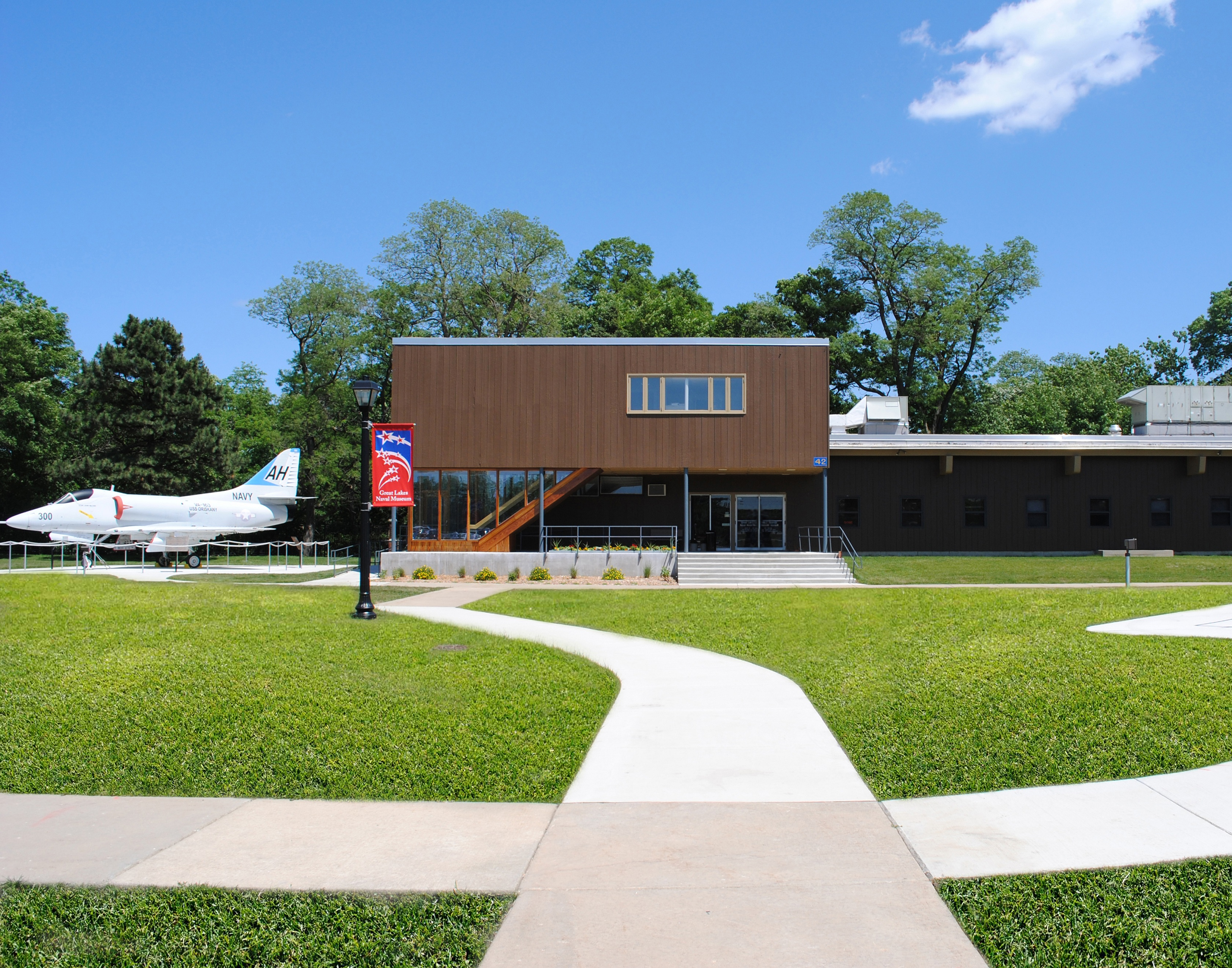
- Established: 2009
- Location: Building 42; 2531 Sheridan Road; Great Lakes, Illinois 60088
- Coordinates: 42.312117°N 87.843470°W
- Type: Naval history
- Website: www.history.navy.mil/content/history/museums/nmas.html

The Great Lakes Naval Museum is one of 13 Navy museums that are operated by the Naval History & Heritage Command. As an official Department of the Navy Museum, the Great Lakes Naval Museum's mission is to select, collect, preserve, and interpret the history of the United States Navy with particular emphasis on the Navy's only "boot camp" at the Naval Training Station/Center at Great Lakes, Illinois.

== Collections and exhibits ==
The museum’s permanent exhibits include material related to Recruit Training Command, the history of women and diversity in the Navy, and the History of Great Lakes Naval Station and its impact on the Navy as a whole.

== History ==
In January 2009 the Great Lakes Naval Museum became an official Department of the Navy Museum operated by the Naval History and Heritage Command. The Great Lakes Naval Museum is located in Building 42 at Naval Station Great Lakes. Also known as "The Hostess House," the facility was designed in 1942 by prominent architect Gordon Bunshaft of the prestigious architectural firm Skidmore, Owings, and Merrill (SOM). Building 42 is one of the New York architect's earliest works in the United States. The building played a historic role in the training of Naval recruits in World War II and served as a meeting place for tens of thousands of recruits, their families, and guests. After World War II, The Building served various functions until it fell into disrepair and was considered for demolition. However, it was recognized as a classic example of modern American architecture and repurposed for the establishment of the a museum which opened January 12, 2009.

== Museum programs and resources ==
The museum also offers guided tours, a lecture series, and educational programs. An active volunteer corps participates in all museum functions. The museum’s collection is open to the general public for academic research via appointment.

== See also ==
- List of maritime museums in the United States
- List of museum ships
