= Culture of Cincinnati =

This is relating to the culture of Cincinnati, Ohio.

== Annual cultural events and fairs ==
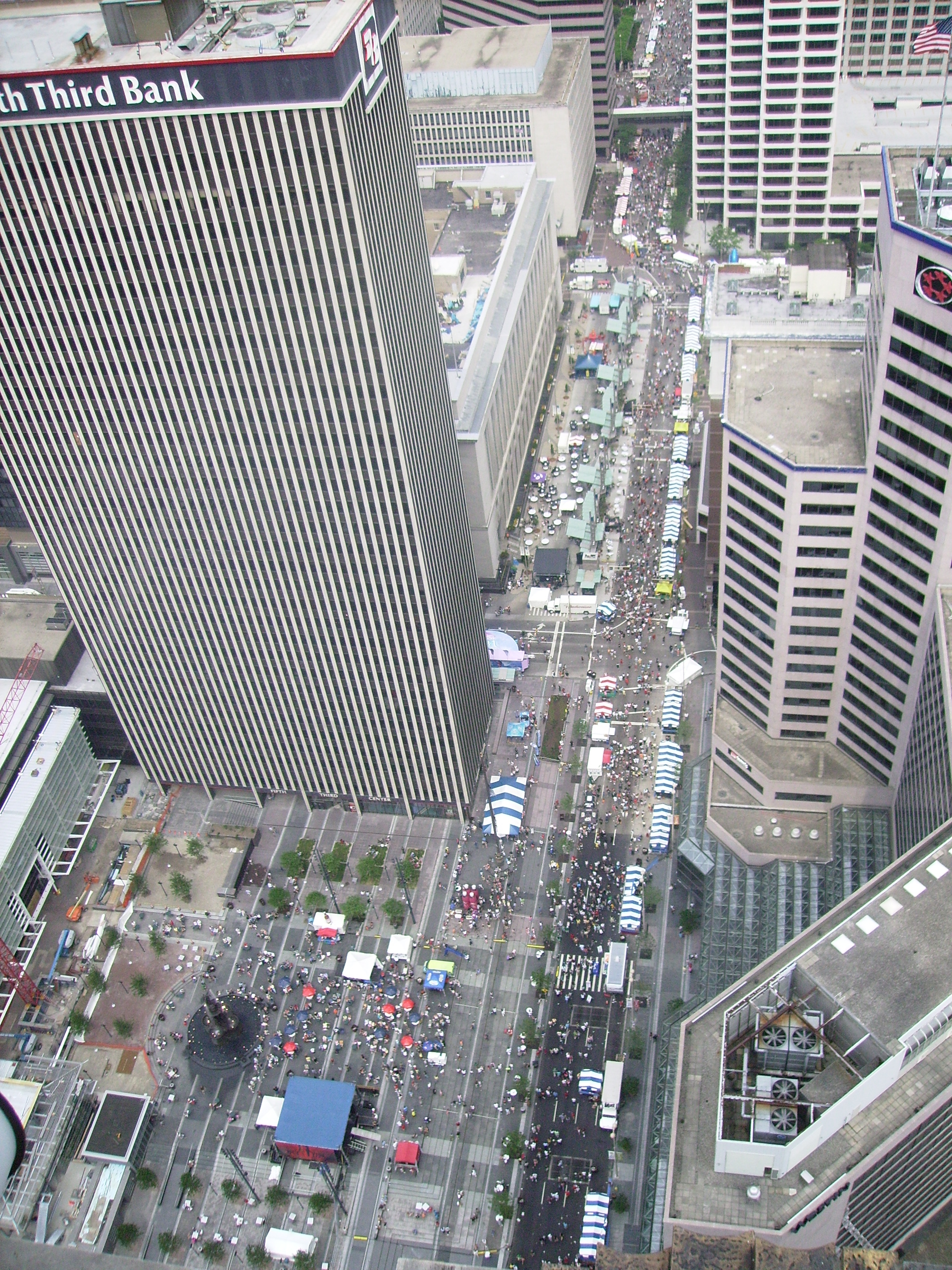
Approximately 500,000 now attend Taste of Cincinnati, making Taste one of the nation's largest street festivals.

- Cincinnati Food & Wine Classic, a three-day festival held in September.
- Bockfest, a beer festival held in Over-the-Rhine on the first full weekend of March.
- Scribble Jam, a hip hop festival, now defunct.
- Cincinnati Pride, The Cincinnati Pride Parade and Festival is a week-long celebration of the city's Lesbian, Gay, Bisexual, Transgender, (LGBT) Queer, and Ally community. The festivities are typically held annually at the end of June.
- Oktoberfest-Zinzinnati, celebrating Cincinnati's German heritage, is the largest Oktoberfest in the US.
- Cincinnati May Festival, a two-week choral festival held in May.
- MidPoint Music Festival is a three-day music festival that takes place in many venues across downtown and Over-The-Rhine in September.
- Riverfest, a festival and fireworks display on Labor Day weekend which draws crowds of over 500,000.
- Cincinnati Reds Opening Day Parade and Game (MLB Official Opening Day)
- Goetta Fest
- Flying Pig Marathon
- Taste of Cincinnati, a food festival held on Memorial Day weekend and attended by over 500,000 annually.
- Bunbury Music Festival, a music festival started in 2012 which takes place on the banks of the Ohio River.
- The Martin Luther King Day Parade
- The Midwest Black Family Reunion
- The Cincinnati Flower Show, organized by the Cincinnati Horticultural Society in late April. This floral event, endorsed by the Royal Horticultural Society, is staged at Symmes Township Park and claims to be the biggest outdoor flower show in the United States.
- Thanksgiving Day Race, the sixth-oldest race in the country.
- Since 1962 the Jazz Festival (now Macy's Music Fest) is held during July.
- MusicNOW Festival is a music festival started by Bryce Dessner of local band, The National, that takes place in venues in Over-The-Rhine.
- The Tall Stacks Festival, held every three or four years to celebrate Cincinnati's riverboat history.
- The Festival of Lights, hosted by the Cincinnati Zoo and Botanical Garden during the year-end holiday season.
- The Cincinnati Fringe Festival 12 Days of Theatre, Film, Visual Art, and Music in the heart of Over-the-Rhine. Ohio's Largest Performing Arts Festival. Begins the day after Memorial Day.

== Cultural and entertainment districts ==
- Cincinnati Main Street Arts and Entertainment District
- Fountain Square District
- Backstage District

== Attractions ==
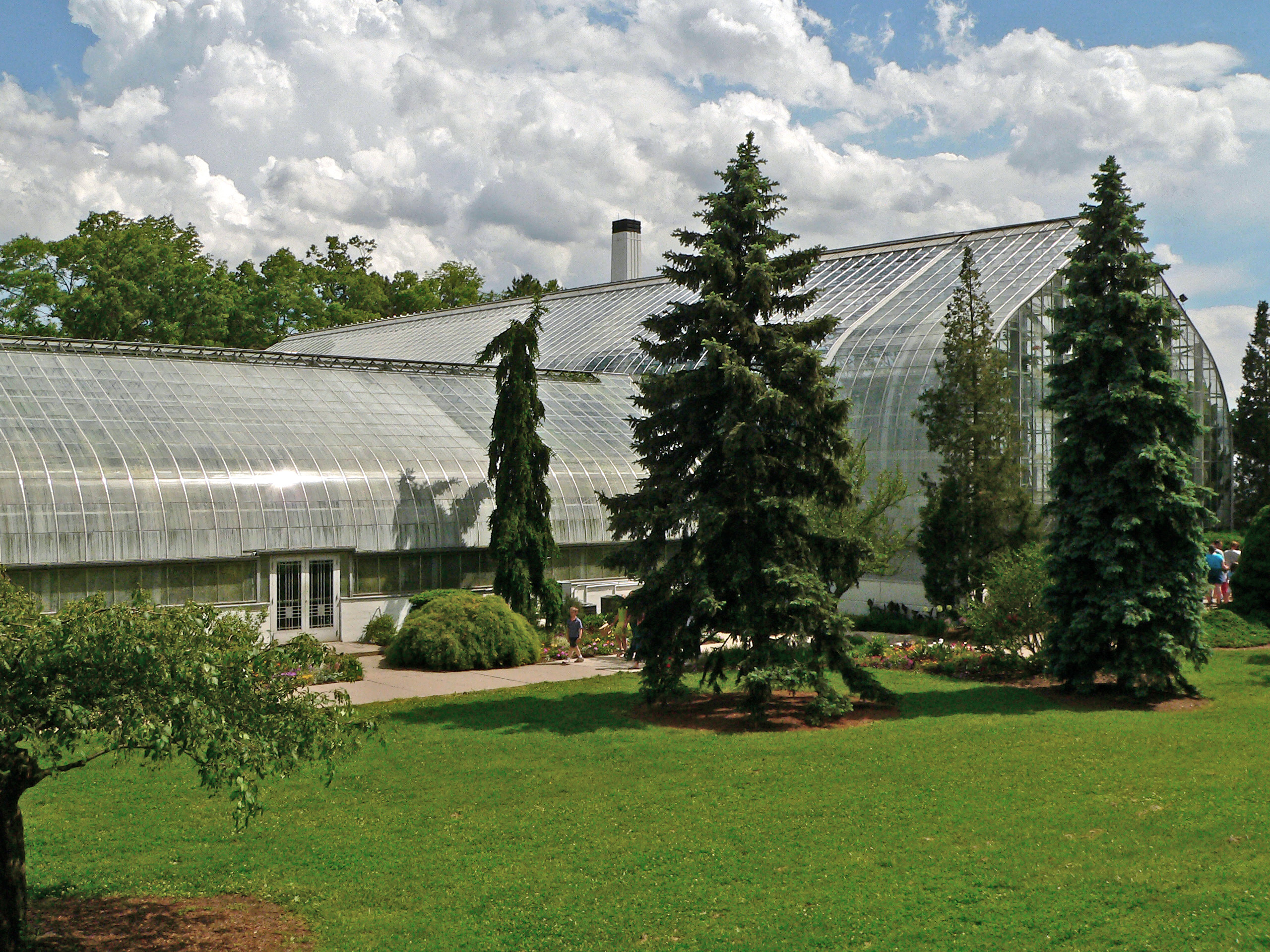
The Krohn Conservatory was completed in 1933, and named in honor of Irwin M. Krohn who served on the Board of Park Commissioners. It now contains more than 3,500 plant species from all over the world.

- Cincinnati Zoo and Botanical Garden
- Newport Aquarium (across the Ohio River)
- Cincinnati Museum Center at Union Terminal houses the Cincinnati Children's Museum, the Cincinnati Museum of Natural History and Science, the OmniMax Cinema, and the Cincinnati History Museum in the Art-Deco Cincinnati Union Terminal
- Krohn Conservatory
- Mt. Airy Arboretum
- Lloyd Library and Museum, world-class collection covering medical botany, pharmacy, eclectic medicine, and horticulture.
- Spring Grove Cemetery
- Coney Island of Cincinnati
- Kings Island, in Mason, 20 miles northeast of Cincinnati
- Soak City (Kings Island), in Mason, located inside Kings Island
- The Beach Waterpark, in Mason
- TPC at River's Bend, a golf club that hosts a Champions Tour event (men's senior golf)
- Cincinnati Open, an important tennis tournament held in Mason
- National Underground Railroad Freedom Center
- Taft Museum of Art
- American Classical Music Hall of Fame and Museum
- Cincinnati Art Museum
- Cincinnati Fire Museum
- Cincinnati Observatory
- Contemporary Arts Center / Rosenthal Center for Contemporary Art
- Drake Planetarium
- National Signs of the Times Museum
- Creation Museum

== Food and dining ==
Cincinnati's German heritage is evidenced by the many eateries that specialize in schnitzels and hearty Bavarian cooking.

=== Cincinnati chili ===
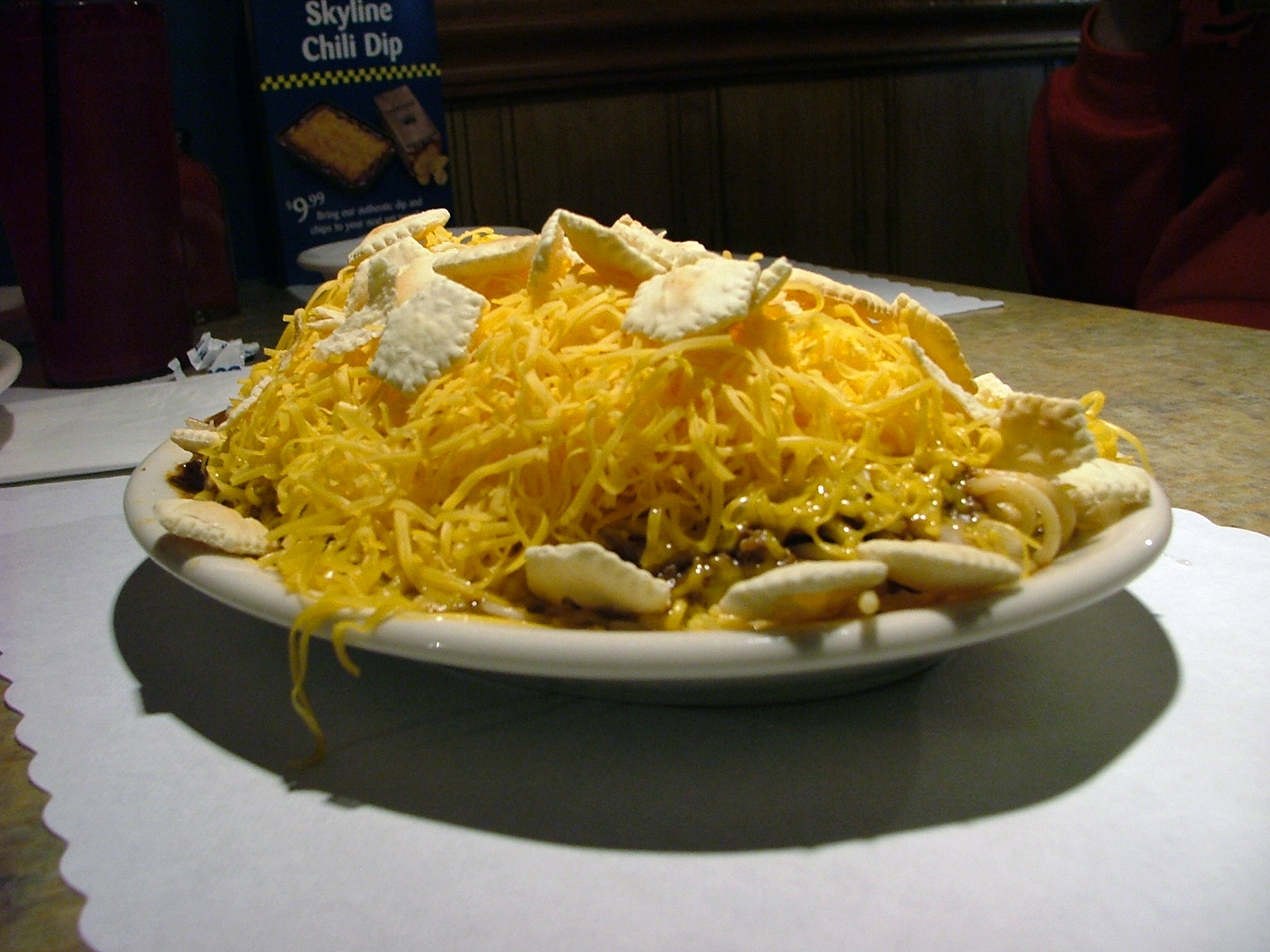
Cincinnatians consume more than two million pounds of Cincinnati chili each year, topped by 850,000 pounds of shredded cheddar cheese.

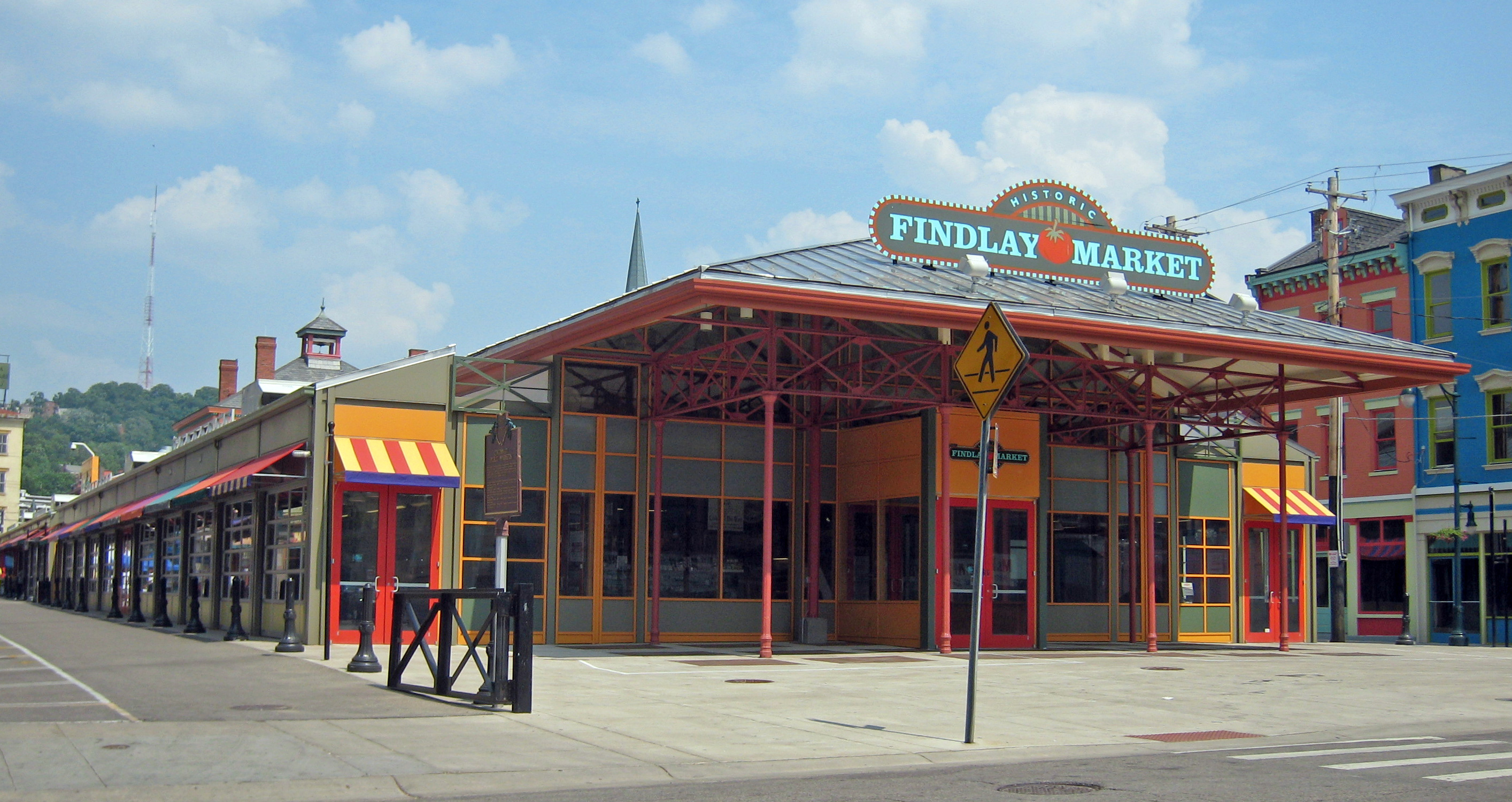
Findlay Market is Ohio's oldest continuously operated public market and one of Cincinnati's most notable institutions. The market is the last remaining market among the many that once served Cincinnati.

"Cincinnati chili" is "one of this nation's most distinctive regional plates of food," according to national food writers Jane and Michael Stern. It is a Mediterranean-spiced meat sauce served over spaghetti or hot dogs at several chains such as Skyline Chili, Gold Star Chili, Empress Chili, and Dixie Chili plus independents such as Camp Washington Chili. The chili is best appreciated not in a bowl, as one would with the chunkier, "Tex-Mex" chili, but rather, as a sauce to cover a plate of spaghetti, covered in shredded cheddar cheese (3-way), the latter with onions or beans (4-way) or with both (as a 5-way), all topped off with oyster crackers and to some, hot sauce. It can also be placed on top of a hot dog in a steamed bun with mustard and onions, and topped with cheddar cheese (referred to as a cheese coney).

=== Findlay Market ===
Findlay Market is the oldest continuously operated public market in the state of Ohio.

=== Goetta ===
Goetta is a meat-and-grain sausage or mush of German inspiration that is popular in the greater Cincinnati area. It is primarily composed of ground meat (pork, or pork and beef), pin-head oatmeal and spices formed into a loaf and then sliced and fried, often in butter, "to a melt-in-the-mouth tenderness."

=== Graeter's ===
Graeter's is a regional chain of ice cream parlors that also sells baked goods and candies. It was founded by Louis "Charlie" and Regina Graeter, husband-and-wife immigrants from Bavaria, in 1870, and grew into a chain under Regina's leadership following her husband's death. The Graeter family still runs the chain, which has spread beyond the Cincinnati area with chain-owned and franchised locations in several regional metropolitan areas, plus one store on the Las Vegas Strip. Pints of the ice cream are also sold in grocery stores in all U.S. states except Hawaii and the Dakotas.

Oprah Winfrey is a fan of Graeter's and caused sales to skyrocket when she raved about the ice cream on her show.

=== Montgomery Inn ===
Montgomery Inn is a local barbecue restaurant that is internationally known for its signature sauce. Bob Hope would frequently have the restaurant's ribs flown to his home in California.

=== Dewey's ===
Dewey's is a Cincinnati area-based pizza company that specializes in a variety of gourmet and delicious pizzas, salads, and calzones. Their fluffy crusted and original pizzas are a Cincinnati favorite, and there are many locations throughout Greater Cincinnati.

=== Larosa's Pizzeria ===
Larosa's Pizzeria is an Italian restaurant that is very popular in Cincinnati, known for its signature pizza with a thin crust, thick and sweet sauce, and provolone cheese.

This pizzeria chain is based out of Cincinnati, in most Cincinnati neighborhoods.

It also serves at major Cincinnati attractions including the Cincinnati Zoo and Botanical Garden, Riverbend Music Center, and Great American Ballpark.

=== Arnold's Bar and Grill ===
Arnold's Bar and Grill is the oldest continuously operated bar in the city and one of the oldest in the country. It was founded in 1861 and has had only four owners, most of whom have lived upstairs.

=== Fine Dining ===
Cincinnati was home to three of the eight Mobil 5-star rated restaurants in the United States in the 1960s; at the time, New York City had two. By 1986 Cincinnati had two 5-star Mobil restaurants, Pigall's and The Maisonette; it was one of only a few cities with two restaurants with the rating.

Pigall's was another Mobil 5-star restaurant. When Jean-Robert at Pigall's closed in 2009, it had earned five consecutive 4-star Mobil ratings and was the only Mobil 4-star restaurant in the tri-state area surrounding Greater Cincinnati.

Wine Spectator recognized 15 area restaurants for the excellence of their wine lists, including two at the "Best Award of Excellence" level, Jeff Ruby's Carlo & Johnny and Jeff Ruby's Steakhouse.

Until 2005, when the restaurant closed, the Maisonette carried the distinction of being Mobil Travel Guide's longest running five-star restaurant in the country. It received Mobil's highest rating for 41 consecutive years, more than any other restaurant in North America. The former Maisonette's chef de cuisine, Jean-Robert de Cavel, has opened several restaurants in the area since leaving The Maisonette. Jean-Robert's Table opened in 2010, French Crust in 2012, and Le Bar a Boeuf in 2014.

The Gourmet Room, on the rooftop of the Terrace Plaza Hotel, was another 5-star Mobil restaurant in the 1970s.

== Galleries ==
- Cincinnati Art Galleries

== Historical structures and museums ==
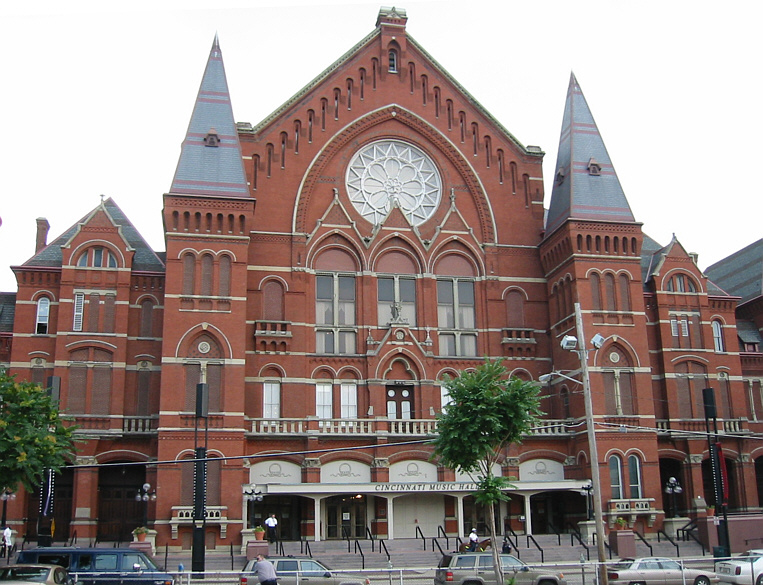
As the fifth-oldest orchestra in the United States, the Cincinnati Symphony Orchestra (CSO) has a legacy of fine music making as reflected in its performances in historic Music Hall, recordings, and international tours.

- Cincinnati Ballet
- Cincinnati Symphony Orchestra, the fifth-oldest orchestra in the United States
- University of Cincinnati College-Conservatory of Music
- Harriet Beecher Stowe House
- Heritage Village Museum
- Hauck House Museum
- William Howard Taft National Historic Site
- Findlay Market

== Parks and outdoor attractions ==
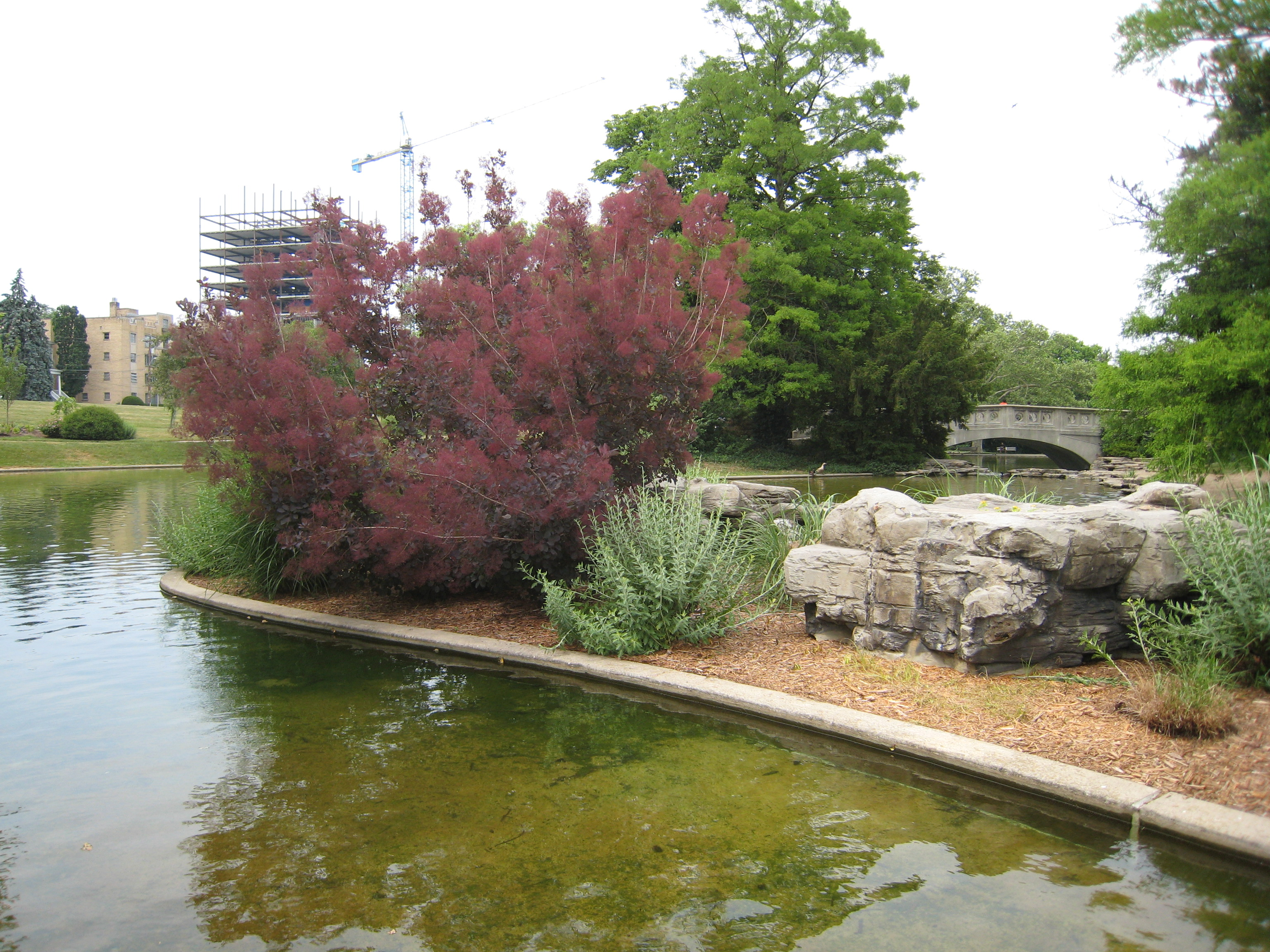
Eden Park is home to the Cincinnati Art Museum.

- Mt. Adams
- Clifton
- Mount Echo provides one of the most excellent views of Downtown Cincinnati from its West Side Price Hill location.
- Eden Park, Cincinnati, located in Mt. Adams, hosts the Cincinnati Art Museum, Krohn Conservatory, and Playhouse in the Park. It has extravagant water systems throughout the park.
- Fountain Square, Cincinnati includes the Tyler Davidson Fountain.
- Hauck Botanic Gardens, home to the Civic Garden Center of Cincinnati
- Sawyer Point, Located along the shore of the Ohio River just south of downtown Cincinnati, this mile-long linear park features many different spaces serving all segments of the region's population.
- Theodore M. Berry International Friendship Park, located along Cincinnati's downtown eastern riverfront area was opened to the public on May 17, 2003. The park is named in honor of Cincinnati's first African American mayor, Theodore M. Berry, who served as Cincinnati's mayor from December 1972 to November 1975.
- Cincinnati Riverfront Park is a proposed park being planned, part of The Banks project .
- Other parks within the city include: Alms Park, Ault Park, Inwood Park, Avon Woods, Kennedy Heights Park, Bellevue Hill Park, LaBoiteaux Woods, Bettman Center, Little Duck Creek, Brodbeck Preserve, Lytle Park, Burnet Woods, Magrish Preserve, Buttercup Valley & Parkers Woods, McEvoy Park, Caldwell Park, Miles Edwards Park, California Woods, Mt. Airy Forest, Drake Park, Mt. Storm Park, Fairview Park, Owl's Nest Park, Fernbank Park, Rapid Run Park, Fleishmann Gardens, Seymour Preserve, French Park, Stanbery Park, Glenway Woods, and Washington Park.
- For more parks within Cincinnati's Hamilton County, see: Hamilton County Park District

== Music venues ==
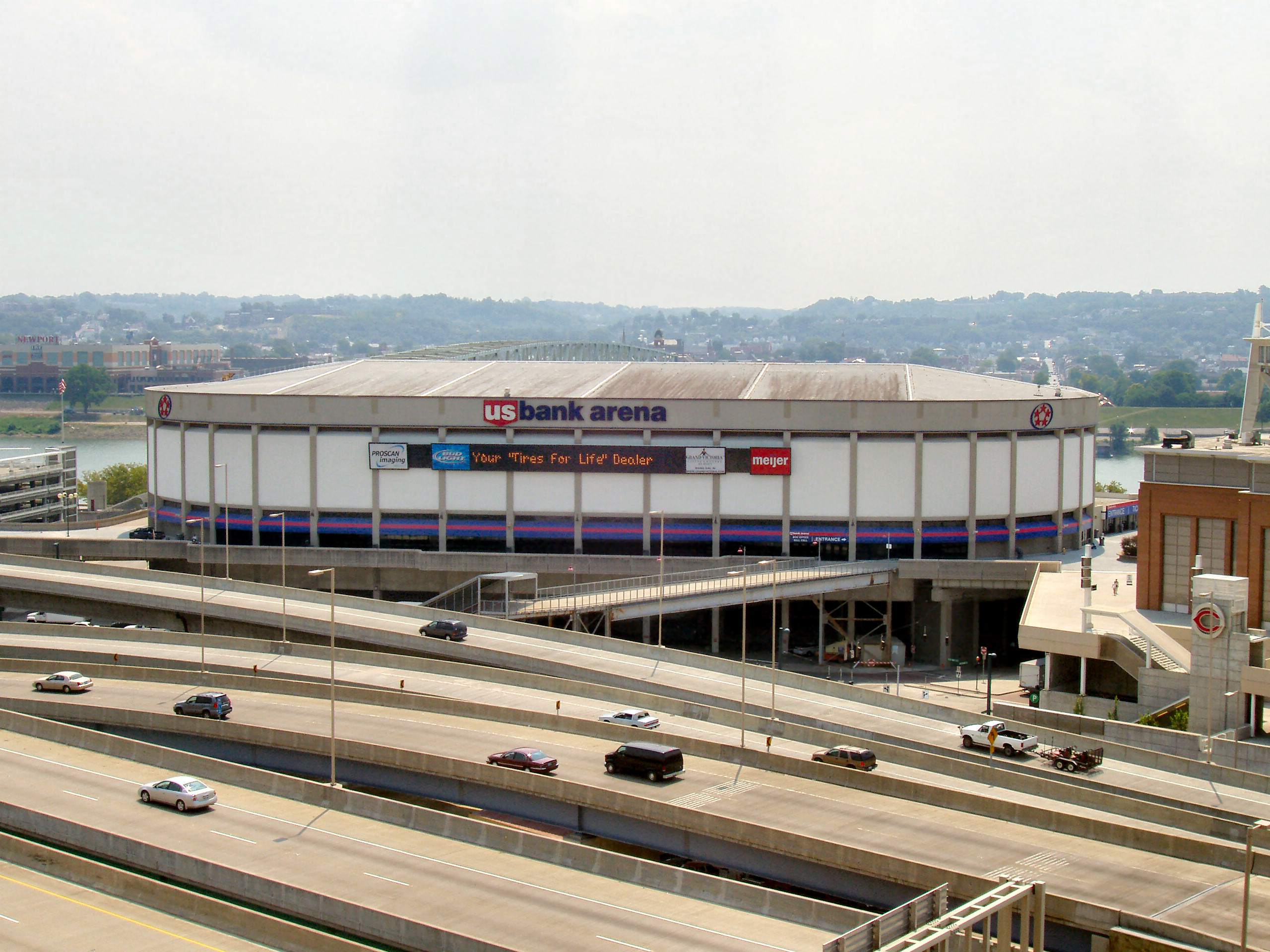
Heritage Bank Center is home to not only big music acts but also local hockey, indoor football, and basketball.

- Annies
- Bogart's
- Live! at the Ludlow Garage
- Madison Theater, Covington, Kentucky
- Rhinos
- Riverbend Music Center
- Rohs Street Cafe
- Southgate House, Newport, Kentucky
- Taft Theater
- Timberwolf Amphitheater, Kings Island. Ohio
- 20th Century Theater
- Heritage Bank Center

== Theater ==
Cincinnati hosts a community of theater artists, educators, and producers. Audiences can attend professional, semi-professional, community, and educational theater opportunities year-round in the Cincinnati tri-state area. Many theatres within the region are members of the League of Cincinnati Theatres. In addition to theater experiences offered through most high schools, many of which are critiqued by local students through the Cappie Awards program, Cincinnati offers a number of college-level theater/performing arts training and performing opportunities.

=== Professional (Equity) theater ===
- Cincinnati Playhouse in the Park
- Ensemble Theatre of Cincinnati

=== Professional (non-Equity) theater ===
- Know Theatre Tribe

=== Educational theater ===
- University of Cincinnati College-Conservatory of Music
- Xavier University
- Northern Kentucky University
