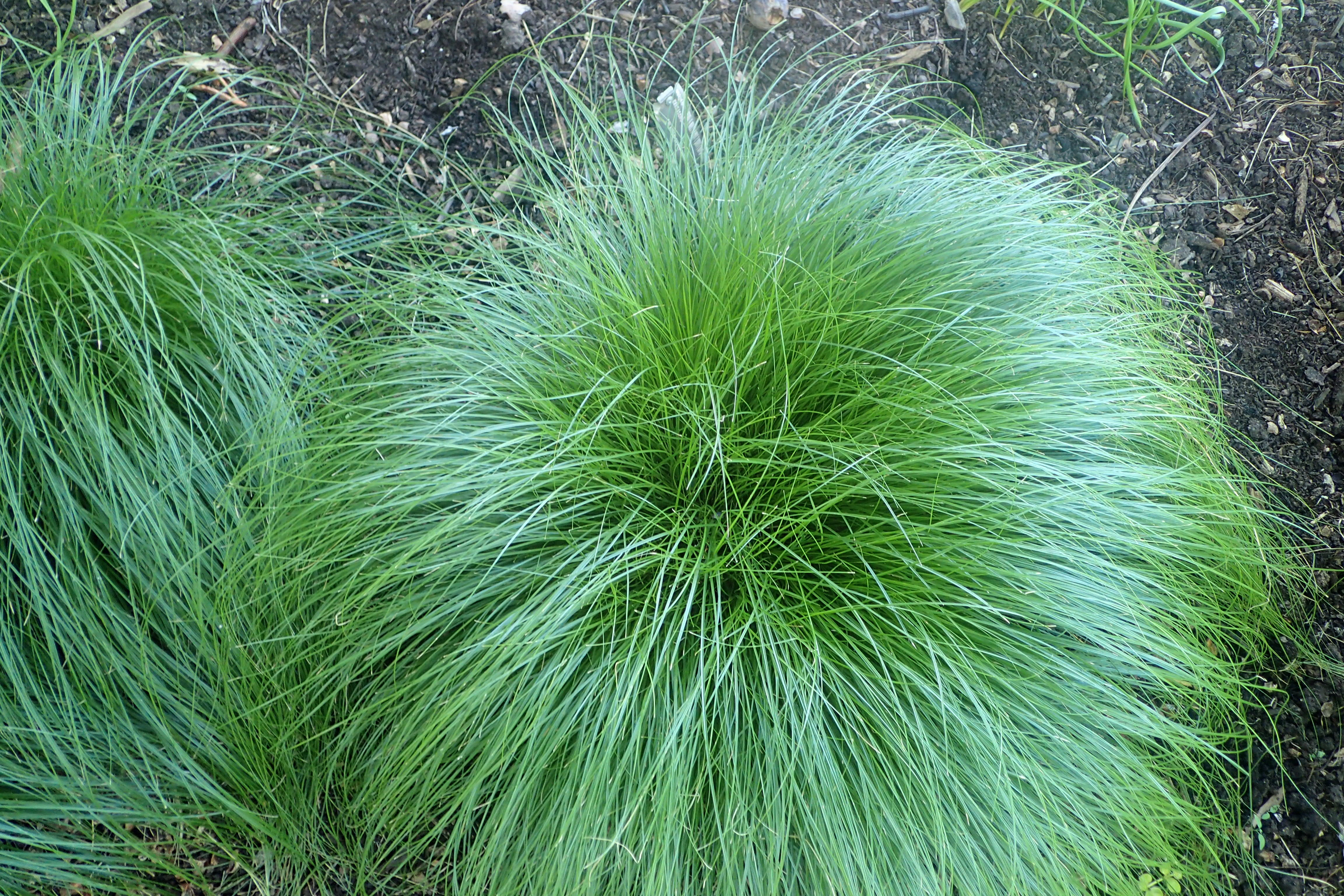

Scientific classification
- Kingdom: Plantae
- Clade: Tracheophytes
- Clade: Angiosperms
- Clade: Monocots
- Clade: Commelinids
- Order: Poales
- Family: Cyperaceae
- Genus: Carex
- Subgenus: Carex subg. Vignea
- Section: Carex sect. Phaestoglochin
- Species: C. rosea

Binomial name
- Carex rosea Schkuhr ex. Willd.

= Carex rosea =

Species of sedge

Carex rosea, the rosy sedge, is a flowering plant and part of the family Cyperaceae. Synonyms for Carex rosea include Carex concoluta, and Carex flaccidula. It is native to central and eastern North America and it exists in wet to dry soils. Carex rosea can be found in shores of streams and bottomlands, as well as ponds. It is known to have good adaptations to dry-shade locations. It is an evergreen plant which is easy to grow.

== Description ==
Carex rosea flowers in the spring, and it has evergreen leaves. The styles of this Carex rosea, the stalk connecting the stigma to the ovary, are very distinctively curled, which helps to differentiate this species from other plants. The stigmas range from 0.07 to 0.10 mm thick, while the leaves are almost 1/8 mm wide. The width of the stem leaf blade ranges from 1.8 to 2.6 mm. The lowest bract either has no sheath or the sheath it has is very short up to four mm in length. The lowest spike is not borne on a peduncle, which is a stalk that supports inflorescence growth to more than one flower. The uppermost spike contains both carpels and stamens, with the carpels located below, or mixed in, with the stamens. The membrane that encloses the flower has no hairs and its length varies between 2.6 and 4.2 mm. The leaf sheath has no pink, red, or purple tinting and the leaf blade can either be, smooth and hairless, or rough and sandpapery. The leaves are all produced from the base of the plant, and the one-seeded fruit, usually ranging from 1.6 to 2.2 mm, has no folds or dimples. The spikelets found in the plant are widely spread rather than clustered together, and the culms consist of about 4–8 spikelets. Spikelets are green because of the presence of 7–14 spreading perigynia.

== Taxonomy ==
Carex rosea is the type of the Carex rosea complex. While some characters seem to be unreliable for the separation of each species, other characters, like the width of the broadest leaves, the shape of the perigynium base, and the fertile culms, are reliable. Different analysis of the mixed populations have concluded that hybridization between the species does not occur. According to results from a complete ITS sequence based phylogeny, Carex rosea is sister to Carex radiata, Carex retroflexa, Carex texensis, and Carex socialis. The species Carex appalachica is another member of this complex. This plant is primarily confused with Carex radiata. Typically Carex rosea occurs in drier sites and has slightly narrower leaves.

== Distribution and habitat ==
C. rosea is distributed from Nova Scotia and southern Quebec west to Minnesota and eastern Nebraska; and south to Georgia, Tennessee, and Arkansas. Its habitat is dry-to-moist woodlands. It can adapt to various soil types and it can also live in rich ravines, and wood edges.

== Ecology ==
Carex rosea can complete its life cycle in a little more than two years. Even though the genus Carex has been considered nonmycorrhizal, recent evidence has demonstrated that mycotrophy may be more spread among the sedges than realized.

== Horticulture ==
Plants that have already been established to a place are highly drought-tolerant. Carex rosea is unappetizing to deer and other herbivores. Many times Carex rosea, or sedge in general, are used as ground covers. This is a way to help with the maintenance of green expanses near houses since it is an evergreen plant. It is recommended for the plant to be cut completely off before the winter season starts. The more highly adaptable sedges grow in warm-weather conditions and if mowing the land is a choice, then it is recommended to do it only a few times a year, compared to regular grass which is almost every other week.

== Conservation status ==
The IUCN indicates that this species has not been assessed. However, no potential threats are known to Carex rosea. This plant is widely distributed and common.
