= Karl Gercens III =

American horticulturist

Karl Gercens is an American horticulturist. Gercens' experimentation with plant types and growing methods in the Southern United States sparked an interest in the cultivation of ornamental plants.

Born in Mississippi, Gercens received a degree in Ornamental Horticulture from Mississippi State University. He then held internships at Walt Disney World in Orlando, Florida and Filoli Estate in Woodside, California.

Gercens has worked for over 25 years at Longwood Gardens in Kennett Square, Pennsylvania. He has influenced the design, installation, and maintenance of the facility's large conservatory displays

Gercens is known for using a pallet of colored foliage trees, shrubs, and perennials. He has given lectures at the San Francisco Flower & Garden Show, the Northwest Flower and Garden Show, the Cincinnati Flower Show, the Philadelphia Flower Show, the Capital District Garden and Flower Show and the Southeastern Flower Show. Gercens has visited over 450 gardens in America and has catalogued images of gardens from more than 20 countries.

== Sources ==
- https://web.archive.org/web/20090309033030/http://www.theflowershow.com/attractions/lecturesdemos2009.html
- http://www.flowershow.com/index.php?id=80&type=98%5B%5D
- http://www.washingtonpost.com/wp-dyn/content/article/2007/11/28/AR2007112800676.html
- https://web.archive.org/web/20090131232331/http://longwoodgardens.org/InstructorBios.html
- http://www.pjstar.com/home_garden/x834867293/Many-arid-looking-succulents-right-at-home-here
- http://www.philly.com/philly/classifieds/real_estate/20080425_Can_t_contain_yourself.html?text=reg&c=y
- http://www.gardensmart.tv/pages.php?page=2&subpage=2006_show3
