= Melissa Powers =

Prosecuting Attorney for Hamilton County, Ohio (Cincinnati Metro Area)

Melissa Powers is an attorney and retired judge who served as prosecuting attorney for Hamilton County, Ohio. She served in this position from January 2023 until December 2024 when she was narrowly defeated by Democratic candidate Connie Pillich in the November elections. She was appointed after incumbent Joseph Deters left the job for a position on the Ohio Supreme Court. Powers is a member of the Republican Party.

== Early life and education ==
Melissa Powers was born in Cincinnati. She grew up in Mt. Airy, a neighborhood of Cincinnati, and graduated from McAuley High School in 1979. In 2018, McAuley merged with Mother of Mercy High School to form Mercy McAuley High School. Powers then graduated from the University of Cincinnati in 1986 with a Bachelor of Science in Art Education. In 1991, Powers graduated from the University of Cincinnati College of Law with her Juris Doctor.

== Career ==
Powers planned a career in corporate law but switched to criminal law after an internship with the city prosecuting attorney’s office. Following her graduation from law school, she took a job working as an assistant prosecuting attorney for Hamilton County. She practiced in the Appellate division and argued cases before Ohio’s 1st District Court of Appeals. She also practiced in the Juvenile, Municipal, and Felony divisions. From 1996 to 1998, she was the assistant chief of the Municipal division.

=== Joseph Paul Franklin Case ===
While working as an assistant prosecuting attorney, Powers obtained the confession of Joseph Paul Franklin, a serial killer charged with several racially motivated cases across the country. Franklin committed several murders throughout the 1970s and 1980s. He also confessed to shooting pornographer Larry Flynt, and civil rights activist Vernon Jordan

On June 8, 1980, Franklin shot and killed cousins Darrell Lane (14) and Dante Evans Brown (13). The two victims were on their way to a neighborhood convenience store at the time of their murders. While waiting on an overpass to shoot a racially mixed couple, Franklin shot the boys instead. The case remained unsolved for over a decade. In 1997, Powers traveled to the prison where Franklin was incarcerated for other murders and obtained his confession for the killings of Lane and Brown. A jury convicted Franklin in 1998, and he received two life sentences for the murders

=== Judicial career ===
Powers served for sixteen years as a judge in Hamilton County. She served on the municipal court and the juvenile court.

=== Prosecuting Attorney ===
In spring 2023, Powers developed the Elder Justice Unit for the Hamilton County Prosecutor’s Office. The unit featured attorneys dedicated to crime targeting area seniors, and a helpline, 15-946-SCAM.

== Awards and accomplishments ==
In 2008, the Anti-Defamation League recognized Powers in Washington DC with the Ina Kay Crimes Against Hatred Award. The accommodation is bestowed annually and is one of the ADL’s most prominent citations. The award is named for Ina Kay, a Holocaust survivor from France. Since inception in 1993, 133 people have been honored with this award.
