= Ernie's =

Former restaurant in San Francisco, CA

Coordinates: 37.79698°N 122.40373°W

- Interactive map of Ernie's

Restaurant information
- Established: 1900
- Closed: 1995
- Previous owner: Ernie Carlesso
- Location: San Francisco, California, United States

Ernie's (1900–1995) was a restaurant in San Francisco, California. It began as a modest family-style Italian trattoria around the turn of the 20th century. It was located near the notorious Barbary Coast area of the city. In the 1950s, it became known as a luxurious restaurant serving mostly traditional French cuisine. The interior had Victorian or fin-de-siècle bordello-like decor, with plush red wallpaper, heavy drapes, white linen and formal waiters in black tuxedos. Writing in 1979, gastronome Roy Andries de Groot called it "unquestionably the most elegant, famous, finest, and luxurious restaurant in San Francisco and [it] is probably among the three or four greatest truly American restaurants in the country" that "can provide dinners of supreme elegance and luxury".

When it closed in 1995, it was one of the few remaining restaurants of the kind that had once epitomized the celebrated San Francisco dining scene. Among the others, some even older and nearly as well-known, were the Poodle Dog Restaurants, Jack's, The Blue Fox, A. Sabella's and Amelio's. All are now gone, and only a few vestiges of the 19th century still remain in San Francisco: Tadich Grill, Sam's and John's Grill, though none ever enjoyed the reputation for decadent, even illicit, pleasures that many of the others purveyed.

== History ==
Ernie's first chef and owner was Ernie Carlesso. At the time it was called Ernie's Il Travatore. Located at 847 Montgomery Street near Jackson Square, it was on the edge of the Barbary Coast, a red light district that had been known throughout the world since the 1850s for its brothels, saloons, opium dens, gambling and dance halls, and restaurants with discreet private dining rooms upstairs where additional services could be provided. The restaurant serving traditional American-Italian food was so successful that, in 1935, Carlesso and one of his waiters, an immigrant named Ambrogio Gotti, bought the building. The building had been the site of one of the more notorious landmarks of the Barbary Coast, the 'Frisco Dance Hall, and some of its elements remained. Carlesso died in 1946. Gotti retired in 1947, selling his share to his two sons, Roland and Victor, who had been working as busboys. Only 21 and 25 years old when they became sole owners, the two brothers continued in that role for the next 48 years.

Sometime in the late 1940s or early 1950s, the brothers replaced the old red checkerboard tablecloth-type decor with a completely rebuilt interior. The exterior signage was reduced to a single 2 foot square brass plate beside the door with a script "E". The message was clear; they were not looking for walk-in traffic. Their goal, says De Groot, was to "make it the most beautiful restaurant in the world".

The first thing they did was to clean up and move the famous long mahogany bar, with its intricate, stained-glass back, to the front of the restaurant. It was the last remaining relic of the 'Frisco Dance Hall. The main dining rooms were decorated with magnificent Victorian crystal chandeliers, the walls covered with maroon Scalamandre silk brocade, the banquettes and chairs in red, the carpets in burgundy, the furniture, antique pieces from some of the great mansions of San Francisco. The ambiance was that loud, supremely elegant in which the wealthiest nabobs of a hundred years ago might have met the grandest ladies of the night.

French chefs were hired, crêpes Suzette appeared on the menu along with Chicken in Champagne, and by the early 1960s, Ernie's received the first of 32 consecutive annual five-star awards from the Mobil Travel Guide. In 1958, Alfred Hitchcock's classic thriller Vertigo featured a highpoint scene set in Ernie's (as re-created in the film studio).

By the 1980s, tastes in food and decor had changed, and Ernie's was forced to renovate. The menu was lightened, the red silk wallpaper was replaced by yellow silk, the old bar was moved, and new chefs were hired. The transformation was not completely successful. "Ernie's is a parody of a fine restaurant," said the San Francisco Chronicle in 1986, "perhaps because Ernie's serves so many tourists they feel they can play-act their way through a meal. In this tricky business climate when expensive formal restaurants are fading in popularity, the owners of Ernie's would do well to reevaluate their attitude toward their customers." By 1989, the Zagat Survey was calling Ernie's "a fading North Beach flower reincarnated as a stylish, elegant French restaurant", with only 21 points out of a possible 30 for its cuisine, 22 for its decor and 21 for its service, unimpressive scores for so expensive a restaurant. It noted, however, that "gone are the bordello-like setting and snooty service".

In 1993, with new chef Craig Thomas in the kitchen, Zagat was giving it 22 for cuisine and 25 for both decor and service. Although the latter-day Ernie's launched the careers of celebrated local chefs such as Jacky Robert and Alain Rondelli, its efforts to adapt to a changing world were not enough and, on September 30, 1995, Ernie's closed permanently.

== Notes ==
- There are a number of minor discrepancies between the various sourced references about such details as the exact year the building was purchased, for instance, or when the interior was first redone.
