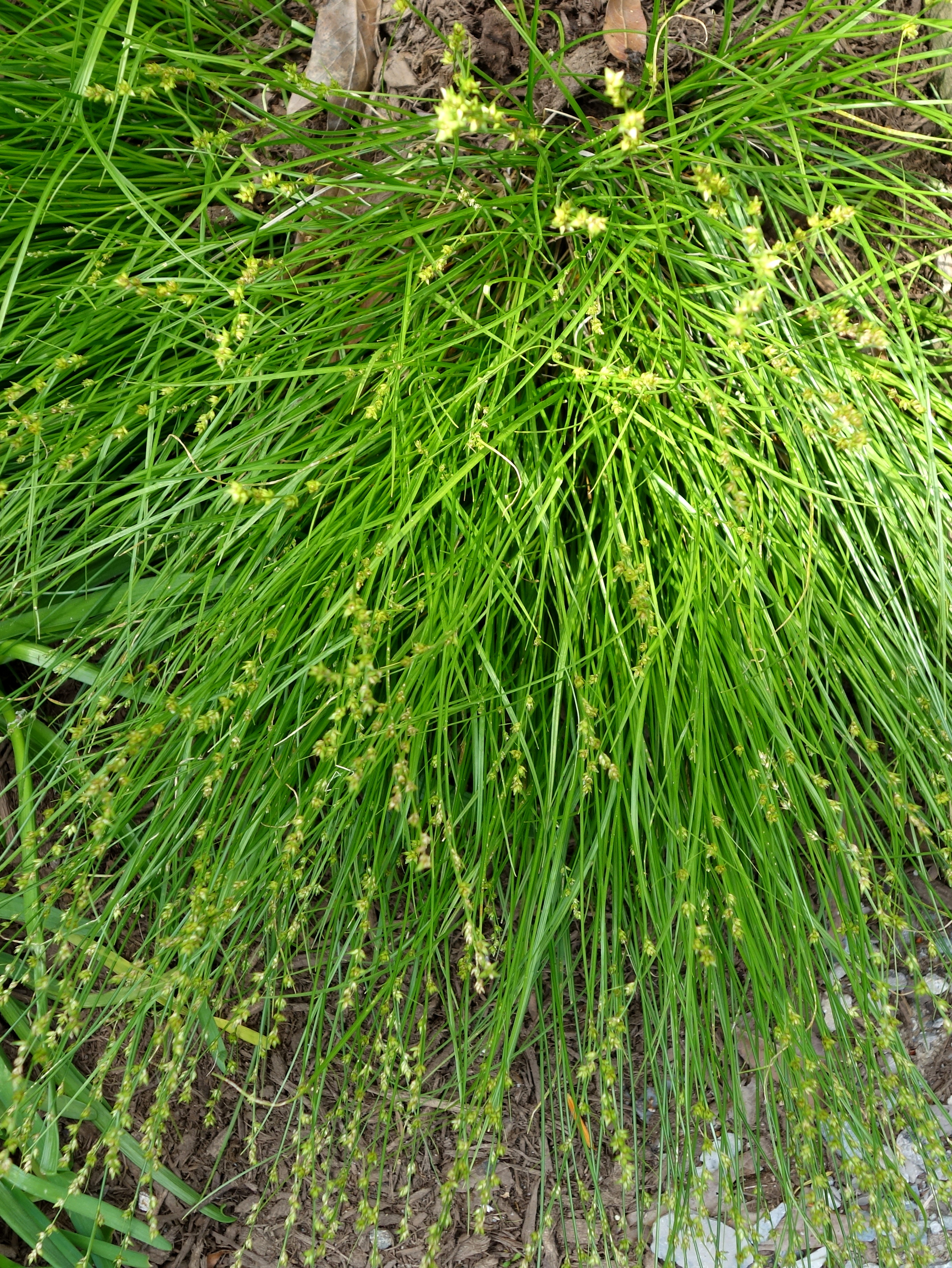
- At the Hauck Botanic Gardens

Scientific classification
- Kingdom: Plantae
- Clade: Tracheophytes
- Clade: Angiosperms
- Clade: Monocots
- Clade: Commelinids
- Order: Poales
- Family: Cyperaceae
- Genus: Carex
- Species: C. radiata

Binomial name
- Carex radiata (Wahlenb.) Small

Synonyms
- Carex rosea var. minor Boott; Carex rosea var. radiata (Wahlenb.) Dewey; Carex stellulata var. radiata Wahlenb.; Carex sylvicola J.M.Webber & P.W.Ball

= Carex radiata =

Species of flowering plant

Carex radiata, the eastern star sedge, is a species of flowering plant in the family Cyperaceae, native to central and eastern North America. It is cultivated for its yellowish-green foliage and its relatively—for a sedge—showy flowers.
