= Pierre Adrian =

American chef

Pierre J. Adrian (c. 1926 – 3 June 1972) was a French-born chef who worked primarily in Cincinnati, Ohio. He spent most of his career as head chef at The Maisonette, which was one of the few restaurants in the United States with five Mobil stars.

== Early life and education ==
Adrian was born c. 1926 in Fouchy, Alsace, France, to Lucien Adrian and his wife, who had a grocery store. He began cooking as an apprentice at age 14. At 17 he passed a certification test as a cook in France. He started cooking professionally at 21, passed his certification test as a chef.

Adrian spent three years as an unwilling soldier during World War II, conscripted by Germany at the age of 16, until after learning his family had fled behind American lines and were safe, he deserted and joined the French underground. He joined the French army in 1945, receiving an honorable discharge.

== Career ==
By age 23 Adrian was head chef at the Hotel du Faucon in Thun; according to his obituary he was at the time the youngest head chef in Switzerland. He moved to New York in 1951 at age 25 with only $30 to take a position at the Sherry-Netherland. He moved to Cincinnati, where he worked first at the Maisonette, then the Gourmet Room, returning to the Maisonette to take the position of head chef in 1956.

Adrian helped designed the Maisonette's new kitchen after the restaurant changes locations, moving to Sixth Street in Cincinnati's downtown, and helped plan the location's more-casual basement restaurant, La Normandie.

Adrian had a television show teaching cooking skills in the 1960s and wrote recipe columns for local newspapers.

Adrian in 1966, having been invited to a formal dinner as one of the seven US chefs with five Mobil stars to celebrate the awarding of a fifth Mobil star to Cafe Chauveron, said that it was the first time he'd ever worn a formal suit.

== Recognition ==
Adrian earned five Mobil stars during his tenure as head chef at the Maisonette. The restaurant was awarded Holiday Magazine's award of excellence during his tenure. Life named it one of three or four in the country "that is the equal of any regal European restaurant."

== Personal life ==
Adrian married a New York woman, Joan, a chef's daughter, before moving to Cincinnati; the couple had four children, a son and three daughters. Adrian's typical after-work meal was a salami sandwich on rye. He was a golfer, skier, and played soccer as a boy. He died at The Jewish Hospital in Cincinnati on 3 June 1972, at age 46.
