= Mount Airy, Cincinnati =

Coordinates: 39°11′29″N 84°34′13″W

Mount Airy
- Neighborhood of Cincinnati
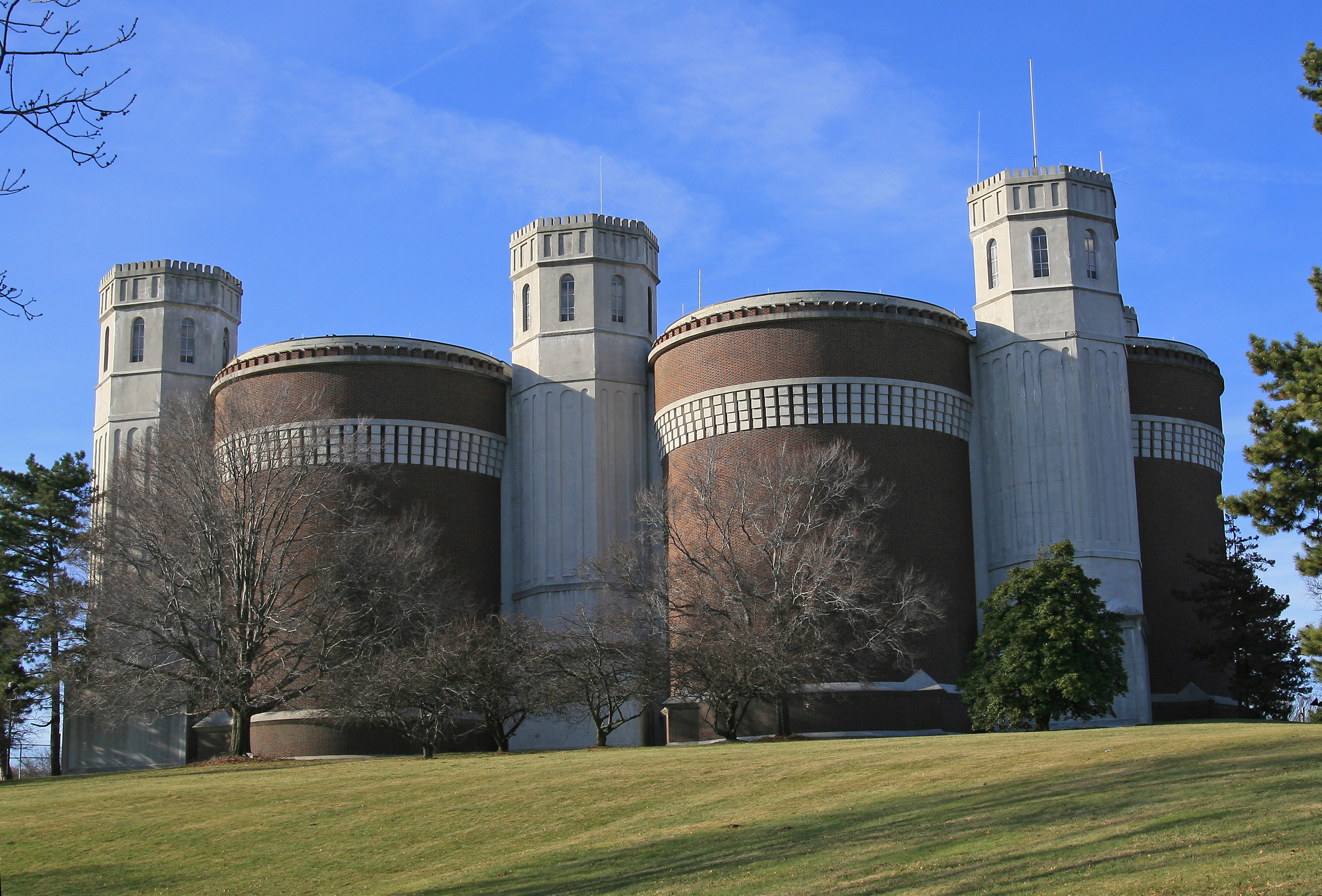
- Mt. Airy Water Tower

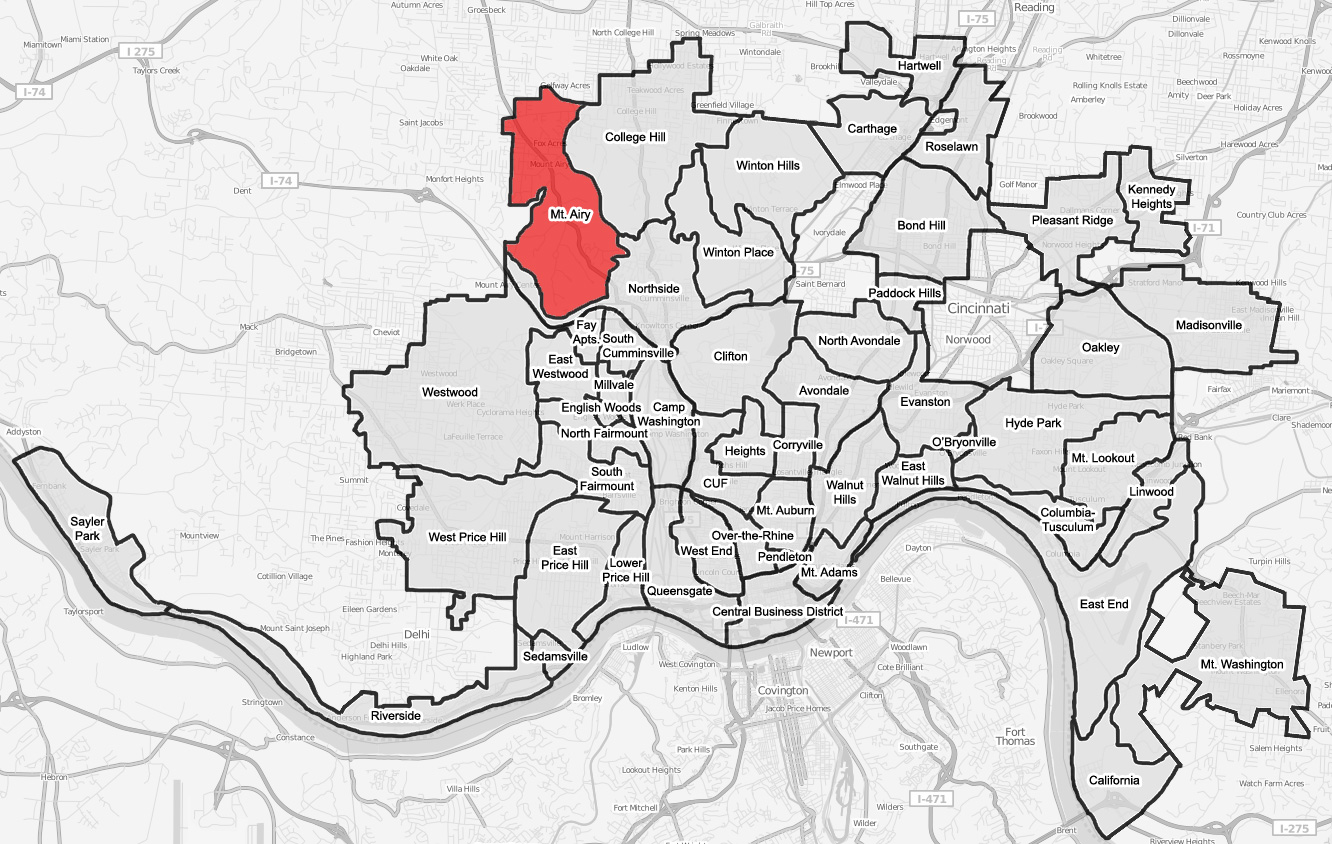
- Mount Airy (red) within Cincinnati, Ohio
- Country: United States
- State: Ohio
- County: Hamilton
- City: Cincinnati

Population (2020)
  - Total: 9,210

Mount Airy is one of the 52 neighborhoods of Cincinnati, Ohio. The neighborhood is home to Mount Airy Forest, one of the oldest urban reforestation projects in the country. The population was 9,210 at the 2020 census.

== History ==
Mount Airy was incorporated as a village in 1865 from land given by Mill Creek and Green townships. Mount Airy was annexed by the City of Cincinnati in 1911.

The neighborhood includes the 1,471 acre Mount Airy Forest, the largest of the Cincinnati parks.

== Demographics ==
Population of Mt. Airy 1900-2020
Year	Pop.	±%
1900	768	—
1910	898	+16.9%
1920	1,025	+14.1%
1930	1,591	+55.2%
1940	1,649	+3.6%
1950	2,371	+43.8%
1960	4,979	+110.0%
1970	11,844	+137.9%
1980	9,453	−20.2%
1990	9,404	−0.5%
2000	9,710	+3.3%
2010	8,779	−9.6%
2020	9,210	+4.9%

As of the census of 2020, there were 9,210 people living in the neighborhood. There were 4,388 housing units. The racial makeup of the neighborhood was 26.6% White, 61.7% Black or African American, 0.3% Native American, 3.1% Asian, 0.0% Pacific Islander, 3.0% from some other race, and 5.4% from two or more races. 4.7% of the population were Hispanic or Latino of any race.

There were 3,739 households, out of which 56.8% were families. 41.9% of all households were made up of individuals.

27.5% of the neighborhood's population were under the age of 18, 60.9% were 18 to 64, and 11.6% were 65 years of age or older. 45.4% of the population were male and 54.6% were female.

According to the U.S. Census American Community Survey, for the period 2016-2020 the estimated median annual income for a household in the neighborhood was $27,920. About 24.5% of family households were living below the poverty line. About 23.3% had a bachelor's degree or higher.

== Infrastructure ==
Interstate 74's Ohio-Iowa segment ends in Mount Airy, OH, while the westernmost North Carolina segment ends in Mount Airy, NC.

=== Mt. Airy Water Tanks ===
These are the Mt. Airy Water Tanks. The main and secondary tanks are visible. There is a Federal Signal Thunderbolt 1000A air raid siren mounted atop one of the secondary tanks on the far left.

Built from 1926-27, the Mt. Airy Water Tanks (also known as the Mt. Airy Water Tower) located in the center of the neighborhood are the defining feature of the Mt. Airy area.

The facility consists of 14 steel water tanks in total, contained in a castle-like brick structure that is over 75 feet tall, with seven of them housed in the main structure, while six taller ones-being around 95 feet tall- are appended onto them, resembling castle towers. Sitting at 962 feet above sea level, it is the highest point in Cincinnati.

The 14 tanks have a combined water capacity of approximately 8.5 million gallons, and have been utilized by the Greater Cincinnati Water Works to provide water to surrounding communities for nearly 100 years. Despite this, it is planned to have them decommissioned around 2030.

== Notable people ==
- Ken Griffey Jr., Hall of Fame baseball player
- Jo Ellen Pellman, actress
