= Mount Airy Arboretum =

Public park in Cincinnati, Ohio, US

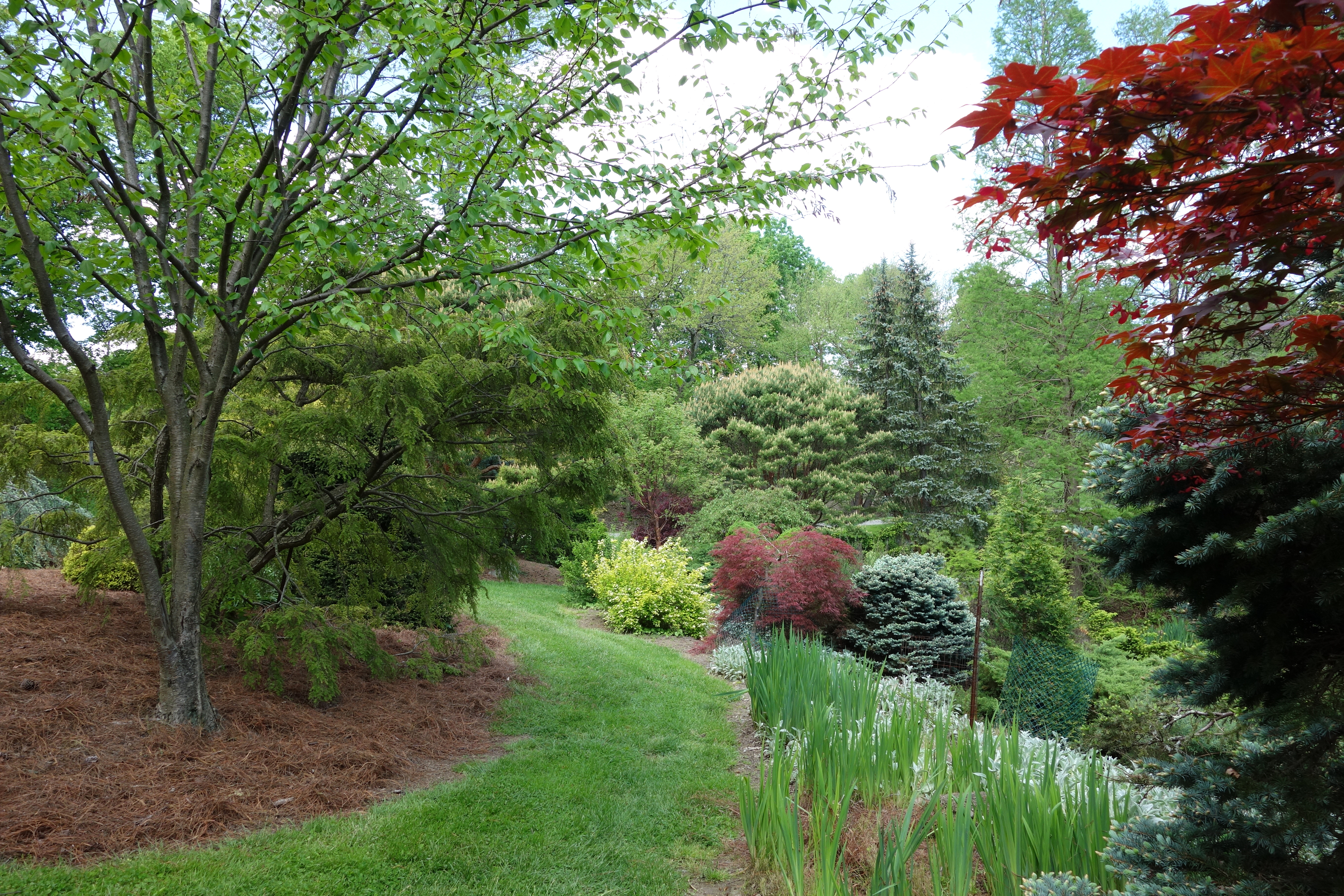
- Mount Airy Arboretum
- Interactive map of Mount Airy Arboretum
- Type: Arboretum
- Location: Cincinnati, Ohio
- Coordinates: 39°10′54″N 84°34′17″W
- Area: 120 acres (49 ha)
- Opened: 1911
- Owner: Cincinnati Park Board
- Website: Official website

Mt. Airy Arboretum, 120 acres (0.49 km^{2}), is an arboretum set within Mt. Airy Forest (1,470 acres), a public park located at 5083 Colerain Avenue, Cincinnati, Ohio. The arboretum is open daily without charge.

The arboretum began in 1911 when the Cincinnati Park Board purchased 168 acres (0.7 km^{2}) of land for reforestation and conservation. It has since expanded to 1,469.913 acres (5.95 km^{2}), of which 700 acres (2.8 km^{2}) are reforested in hardwoods, 200 acres (0.8 km^{2}) reforested in evergreens, 269 acres (1.1 km^{2}) in native woodland, 170 acres (0.7 km^{2}) of open meadows, and 120 acres (0.5 km^{2}) operated as an arboretum proper.

The arboretum includes more than 5,000 plants representing 1,600 species and varieties of woody plants. It contains one of the finest dwarf conifer collection in the Midwest, set around a 1-acre (4,000 m^{2}) pond. Other collections include ash, azalea, birch, beech, buckeye, cherry, crabapple, deutzia, dogwood, elm, euonymus, fir, hawthorn, hemlock, juniper, lilac, magnolia, maple, oak, poplar, spruce, viburnum, willow, and yew.

== See also ==
- List of botanical gardens in the United States
