= Jean-Robert de Cavel =

French-American chef (1961–2022)

- De Cavel, photographed in 2013 by Ryan Kurtz
- Born: September 12, 1961; Roubaix, France
- Died: December 23, 2022 (aged 61)
- Education: Le Feguide, Lille, France
- Spouse: Annette Pfund de Cavel
- Culinary career
- Cooking style: French
- Current restaurant(s): French Crust Cafe, Le Bar a Boeuf, Eat at John-Bob's, Restaurant L, Frenchie Fresh
- Award(s) won: National Order of Merit (France), Maitre Cuisinier de France
- Website: www.jrcincy.com

Jean-Robert de Cavel (September 12, 1961 – December 23, 2022) was a French-American chef active primarily in Cincinnati. He was chef de cuisine at The Maisonette from 1993 to 2002, executive chef at Jean-Robert at Pigall's from 2002 to 2009, and later operated Jean-Robert's Table, Le Bar a Boeuf, and French Crust Cafe. He and his wife founded the de Cavel Family SIDS Foundation, which runs Eat.Play.Give: Friends and Family SIDS Brunch, a culinary event that is the country's largest SIDS fundraiser.

== Early life and education ==
De Cavel was born in Roubaix, France, on September 12, 1961. He was educated at Le Feguide culinary school in Lille, France.

== Professional career ==
De Cavel worked in Zermatt, Antibes, and the British West Indies. He moved to New York City to work for Le Régence at the Hotel Plaza Athénée. In the 1990s he was considered a rising star, but the opportunities for working as a chef de cuisine in a French restaurant in New York City had become very competitive.

In the early 1990s, Cincinnati's The Maisonette was conducting a nationwide search for a new chef de cuisine, and De Cavel's friend Daniel Boulud encouraged him to apply. At the time de Cavel did not know where Cincinnati was; he described having to pull out a map.

De Cavel moved to Cincinnati in 1993 to become chef de cuisine at The Maisonette, which earned 5 stars from Mobil during his time there. His plan was to stay for two or three years, develop his reputation, and move back to New York or Europe. He described the city reminding him of Lille, where he had grown up: a center of industry rather than tourism, and very livable. He "fell in love with the city", and the city with him; he realized that in a metropolitan region of two million, he could become an important influence, opening restaurants rather than simply working in them.

He left Maisonette in 2002 to join a partnership to run his own restaurant, Jean-Robert at Pigall's, which became at the time Ohio's only Mobil four-star restaurant.

With his partners he went on to open JeanRo Bistro, Pho Paris, Greenup Cafe, Twist, and Lavomatic Cafe, all located in the greater Cincinnati area. In 2009 the partnership fell apart and he was left with no restaurants.

He considered leaving Cincinnati after the partnership ended, but instead stayed and opened Jean-Robert's Table in 2010, French Crust in 2011, Le Bar a Boeuf in 2014, Eat at Jean-Bob's in 2015, Restaurant L, and Frenchie Fresh in 2016. He was called "arguably the most recognizable chef in town" and "one of the region's most well-known chefs". The Cincinnati Business Journal said he had "shaped Cincinnati's modern dining scene".

De Cavel appeared in Rebel//Rebel as a chef and in Three Barbecues: A Blackened Comedy (2004) as himself.

=== Teaching ===
From 2009, he was chef-in-residence at the Midwest Culinary Institute.

=== Recognition and legacy ===
De Cavel was a four-time semi-finalist for the James Beard Best Chef in the Great Lakes Region in 2008, 2009, 2012, and 2013. He received three James Beard nominations for Best Chef in the Midwest in 2000, 2001, and 2006 and was invited to cook at the foundation's Greenwich Village headquarters six times.

During his tenure, The Maisonette received five stars from Mobil. Jean-Robert at Pigall's received four stars from Mobil and was recognized by Relais & Châteaux. In 2007 he was named a Master Chef by Maîtres Cuisiniers de France. In early 2022 he was named a Great Living Cincinnatian and a city street was named for him.

Cavel is widely credited for leading and influencing the redevelopment of fine dining in the Greater Cincinnati region. According to Cincinnati food writer Keith Pandolfi, "You can’t go into any kitchen in this city and not find someone who worked for him at some point."

== Restaurants ==
De Cavel was associated with the Michelin-starred restaurants La Bonne Auberge in Antibes, France, The Restaurant at Malliouhana in the British West Indies, and was chef de cuisine at La Régence and La Gauloise in Manhattan. In Cincinnati, he was associated with 5-star Mobil restaurant The Maisonette and 4-star Mobil restaurant Jean-Robert at Pigall's as well as multiple others.

== Philanthropy ==
In 2003 de Cavel and his wife Annette founded the de Cavel Family SIDS (sudden infant death syndrome) Foundation following the death of their first child, Tatiana. Since then it has grown annually to become the largest SIDS fundraiser in the country.

== Personal life ==
De Cavel lived with his wife Annette Pfund de Cavel in Newport, Kentucky with their daughter Laeticia.

De Cavel was diagnosed with an aggressive form of leiomyosarcoma in May 2018. He died on December 23, 2022, at age 61. A public memorial service was held January 16, 2023, at Cathedral Basilica of St. Peter in Chains. Over 1300 people, including hundreds in chef's whites, many of them former proteges of de Cavel, attended.
