= John's Grill =

Restaurant in San Francisco, California

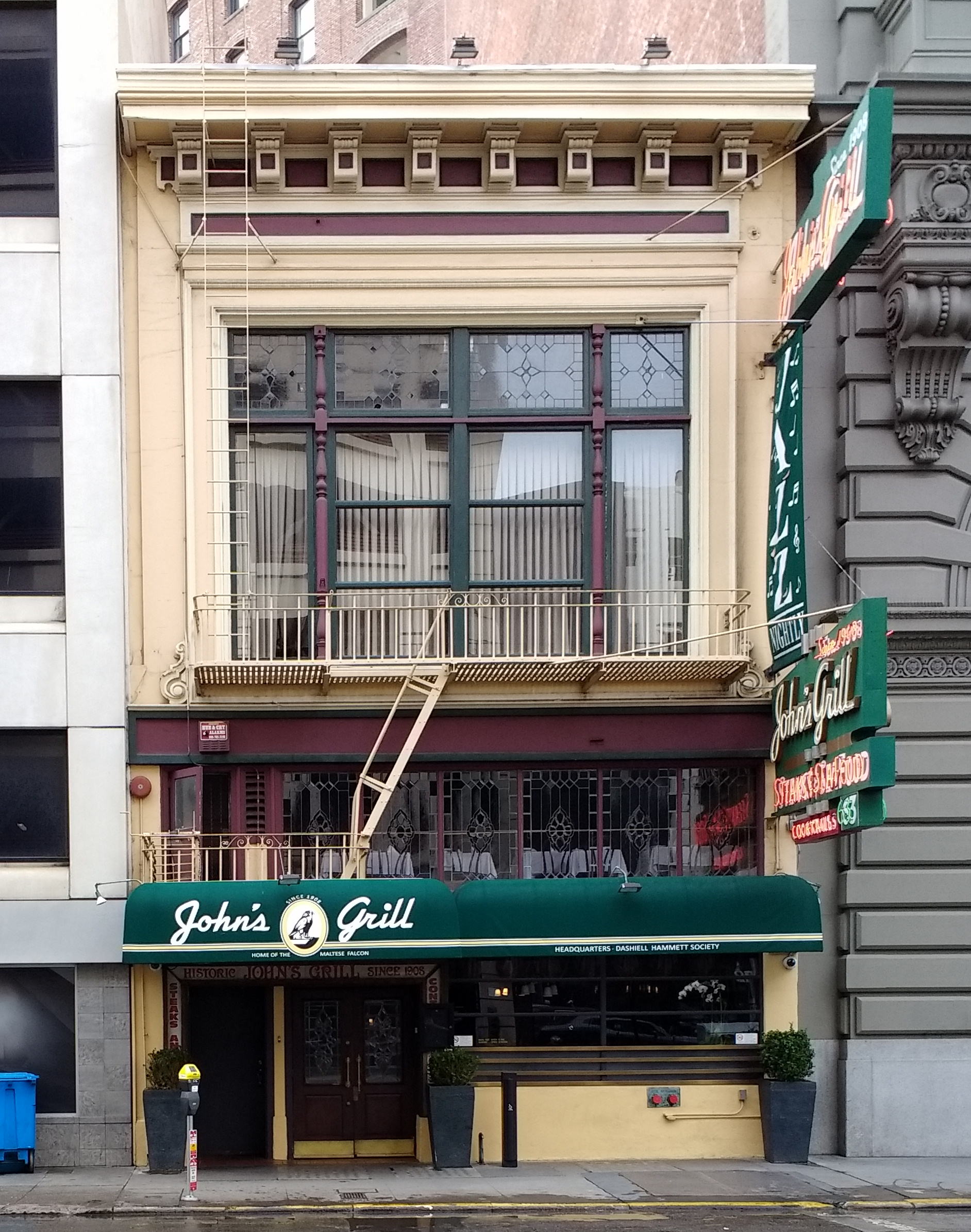
- Interactive map of John's Grill

Restaurant information
- Established: 1908; 118 years ago
- Location: 63 Ellis Street, San Francisco, California, 94102, United States
- Coordinates: 37.7853391°N 122.4069331°W
- Website: johnsgrill.com

John's Grill is a historic restaurant located in the downtown area of San Francisco, California. It is a traditional meeting place for power brokers and politicians, and offers a free lunch on election day. In Dashiell Hammett's 1930 novel The Maltese Falcon, the basis for the 1941 film, detective Sam Spade dines there; the Dashiell Hammett Society is based at the restaurant, and the building houses related memorabilia.

== History ==
John's Grill opened in 1908, reportedly the first restaurant to open in downtown San Francisco after the 1906 earthquake and fire. The founding John is said to have died the same year after being hit by a cable car. In 1983, the restaurant was damaged by fire and was closed for approximately nine months. Gus Konstin, a former waiter and maitre d' at Jack's Restaurant, bought the restaurant and the building in 1969 with his wife, Sydna; she was the manager and was responsible for expanding the dinner business and adding Hammett and Maltese Falcon memorabilia. The Konstins retired in 1990 and their son John Konstin became the owner.

Dashiell Hammett worked for the Pinkerton Detective Agency in the next-door Flood Building and was a regular at John's Grill; in his 1930 novel The Maltese Falcon (adapted in 1941 into the film starring Humphrey Bogart), detective Sam Spade orders "chops, baked potatoes, [and] sliced tomatoes" there. In 1997, the restaurant was declared a literary landmark by the American Library Association.

In September 2020, the restaurant reopened for indoor dining on the first day that city COVID-19 restrictions forbidding it were lifted; in August 2021, the restaurant began requiring patrons to show proof of vaccination for both indoor and outdoor seating, the first in the Bay Area to impose such a requirement. In December 2022, after a lawsuit, it was one of the first businesses to obtain compensation from an insurer for the loss of business caused by the COVID-19 pandemic.

Since the 2010s, John's Grill has offered annual free lunches on election day, presided over by former mayor Willie Brown. It celebrated its 115th anniversary in 2023 with a free block party with wine. In 2024, it was open for the first time on Thanksgiving Day.

== Restaurant ==
John's Grill serves steakhouse food and seafood, and the owners have avoided change. In 2020, a San Francisco Chronicle columnist characterized it as "filled with wood and leather surfaces, white tablecloths and old-school vibes"; in 2021 another described the wood paneling as "dark like Havana cigars" and wrote that the restaurant seemed to have been "preserved in enamel" despite some additions to the menu: "Dinner here is a parade of meat and potatoes, splashed with Francophile butter sauces in infinite configurations." Numerous photos on the walls of past and present celebrities and politicians document its importance as a "power lunch" spot. Jack LaLanne, who was a regular patron, has a salad on the menu named for him.

On the floor above is an exhibition of Maltese Falcon memorabilia, including translated versions of the novel and stills from the film, and a 17-inch (43 cm) lead and bronze falcon statue weighing 150 pounds (68 kg). The falcon is by sculptor Peter Schifrin and students at the Academy of Art San Francisco and was a 2007 replacement for a smaller plaster falcon, a replica of that in the film and signed by the last surviving cast member, Elisha Cook Jr., which was stolen earlier that year together with some books from the collection. The replacement is filled with lead and fishing weights to discourage theft. The Dashiell Hammett Society is based at John's Grill.
