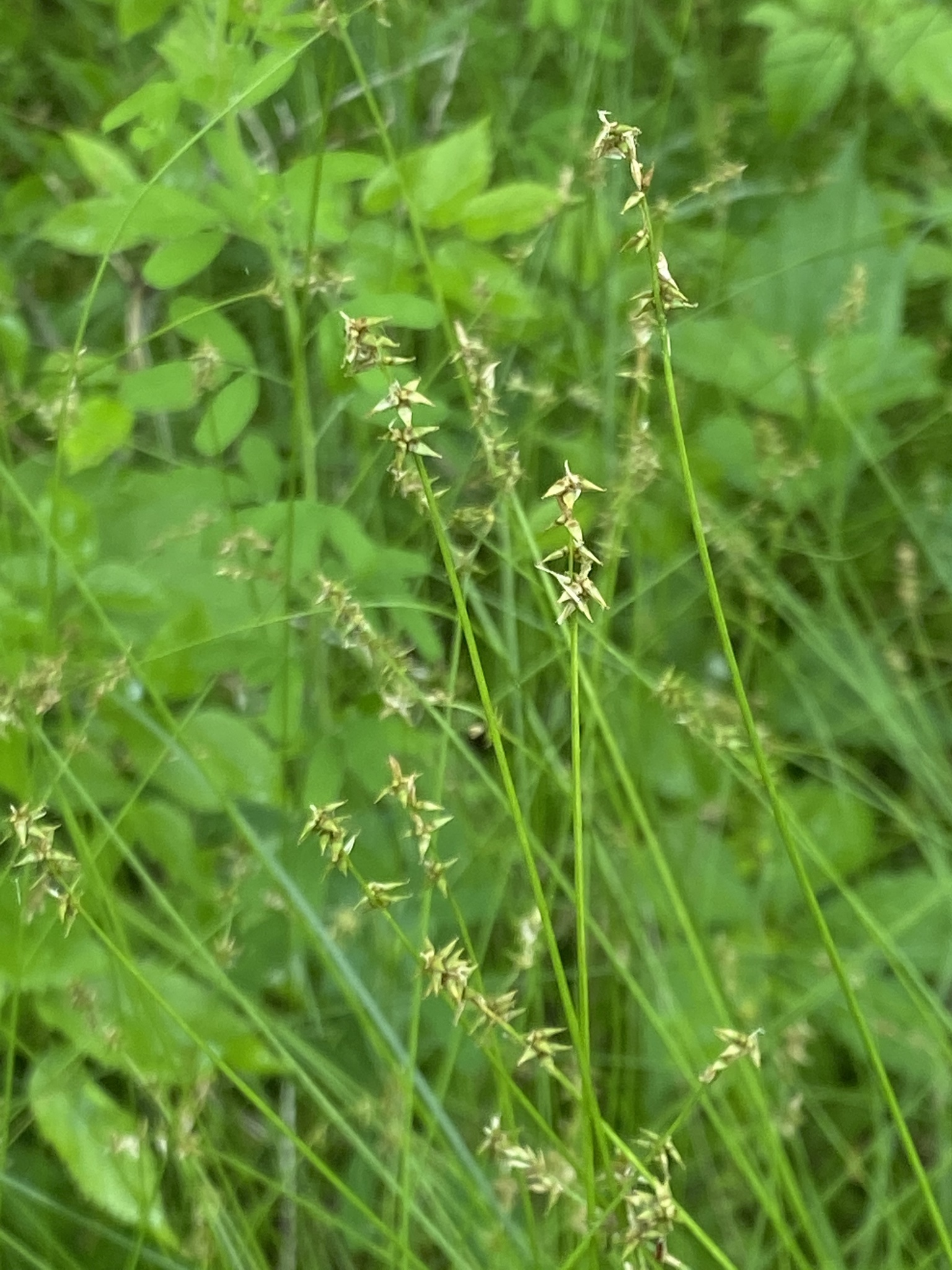
- In Kentucky
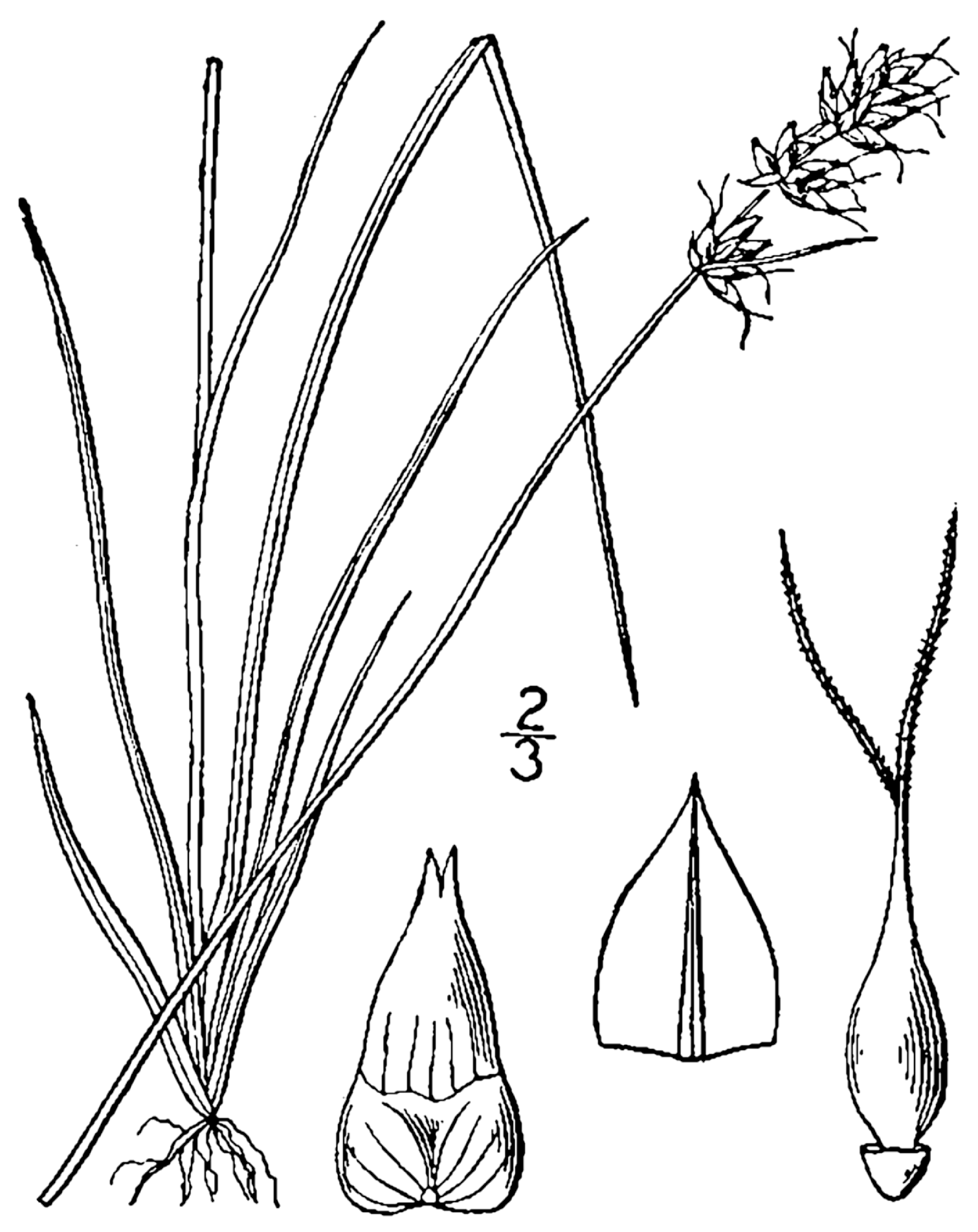
- Botanical illustration

Scientific classification
- Kingdom: Plantae
- Clade: Tracheophytes
- Clade: Angiosperms
- Clade: Monocots
- Clade: Commelinids
- Order: Poales
- Family: Cyperaceae
- Genus: Carex
- Species: C. retroflexa

Binomial name
- Carex retroflexa Muhl. ex Willd.

Synonyms
- Carex rosea var. retroflexa (Muhl. ex Willd.) Torr.; Diemisa retroflexa (Muhl. ex Willd.) Raf.; Vignea retroflexa (Muhl. ex Willd.) Rchb.

= Carex retroflexa =

Species of plant

Carex retroflexa, the reflexed sedge, is a species of flowering plant in the family Cyperaceae. It is native to southern Ontario, and the central and eastern United States A perennial reaching 30 cm (12 in), it is tolerant of wet and dry soils and has moderate drought resistance. Preferring part shade but able to tolerate full sun, it is hardy in USDA zones 5 to 9, and is recommended as a lawn grass alternative.
