= The Maisonette =

Former restaurant in Cincinnati, Ohio, United States

Coordinates: 39°06′10.33″N 84°30′40.31″W

- Interactive map of The Maisonette

Restaurant information
- Established: 1949
- Closed: 2005
- Food type: French
- Rating: Five (Mobil Travel Guide)
- Location: Cincinnati, Ohio, United States

The Maisonette was a French restaurant in Cincinnati, Ohio. Opened in 1949, it received a five-star designation by Mobil Travel Guide in 1964, and closed in 2005.

== History ==
The Maisonette was opened by Nathan L. Comisar in 1949 in the basement of La Normandie, also owned by Comisar, in the Fountain Square Building in Cincinnati. Comisar named the restaurant after a club by the same name in the St. Regis Hotel in New York City.

In 1964 it was awarded its first Mobil 5-star award. In 1966 both restaurants were moved to East Sixth St, with The Maisonette at street level and La Normandie in the basement.

The Maisonette was a fine-dining restaurant, but in the mid-1990s it relaxed its dress code.

It was North America's most-highly-rated restaurant before it closed.

=== Owners ===
- Nathan Comisar (1949)
- Vallie Karrick Comisar and Lee Comisar (1949-1964)
- Lee Comisar and Michael J. Comisar, the sons of the founder (1964-xxxx)
- Nat Comisar and Michael E. Comisar, the sons of Lee Comisar and Michael J. Comisar (xxxx-2003)
- Nat Comisar (2003-2005)

=== Chefs ===
- Maurice Gorodesky (1953-1956)
- Pierre Adrian (1956-1972)
- Georges Haidon (1972-1993)
- Jean-Robert de Cavel (1994-2001)
- Bertrand Bouquin (2001-2005)

== Cuisine and recognition ==
Serving French cuisine and owned by the Comisar family and located since 1966 at 114 E. 6th Street in Cincinnati, Ohio, the Maisonette received the five-star award (the highest designation given by Mobil Travel Guide) forty-one years in a row, the longest streak for any North American restaurant.

== Closure ==
Opinions vary on the cause of Maisonette's decline. There were fewer customers who wanted to dress for dinner, fewer corporations willing to cover expensive business lunches, operating costs increased, and the City of Cincinnati refused to offer it a tax break. The Maisonette had plans to move to Cincinnati's Kenwood suburb, where it hoped to attract a younger crowd; however, the Hamilton County Planning Commission rejected zoning for the proposed Sycamore Square project, a $60 million development that was to include a relocated Maisonette as the anchor tenant.

The Frost Brown Todd law firm purchased the rights to the name The Maisonette for an unnamed client for $35,000 after the restaurant closed in 2005. In 2013, the Phoenix Restaurant Group acquired the trademark.

== Space ==
In 2013 David Falk's restaurant Boca moved into the space formerly occupied by The Maisonette and Sotto into the space formerly occupied by La Normandie.

== Noted dishes ==
The lobster bisque, chateaubriand jardiniere, brill en croute, Dover sole, raspberry chicken and cafe brulot were noted dishes.

== Awards ==
- Distinguished Restaurants of North America
- Mobil Travel Guide Five Star Award
- Restaurants and Institutions Ivy Award
- American Automobile Association Four Diamond Award
- Wine Spectator Award of Excellence
- Wine Spectator Grand Award Top 100
- Les grandes tables du monde

== See also ==
- Golden Lamb Inn
