= Hauck House Museum =

Building in Cincinnati, Ohio

John Hauck House
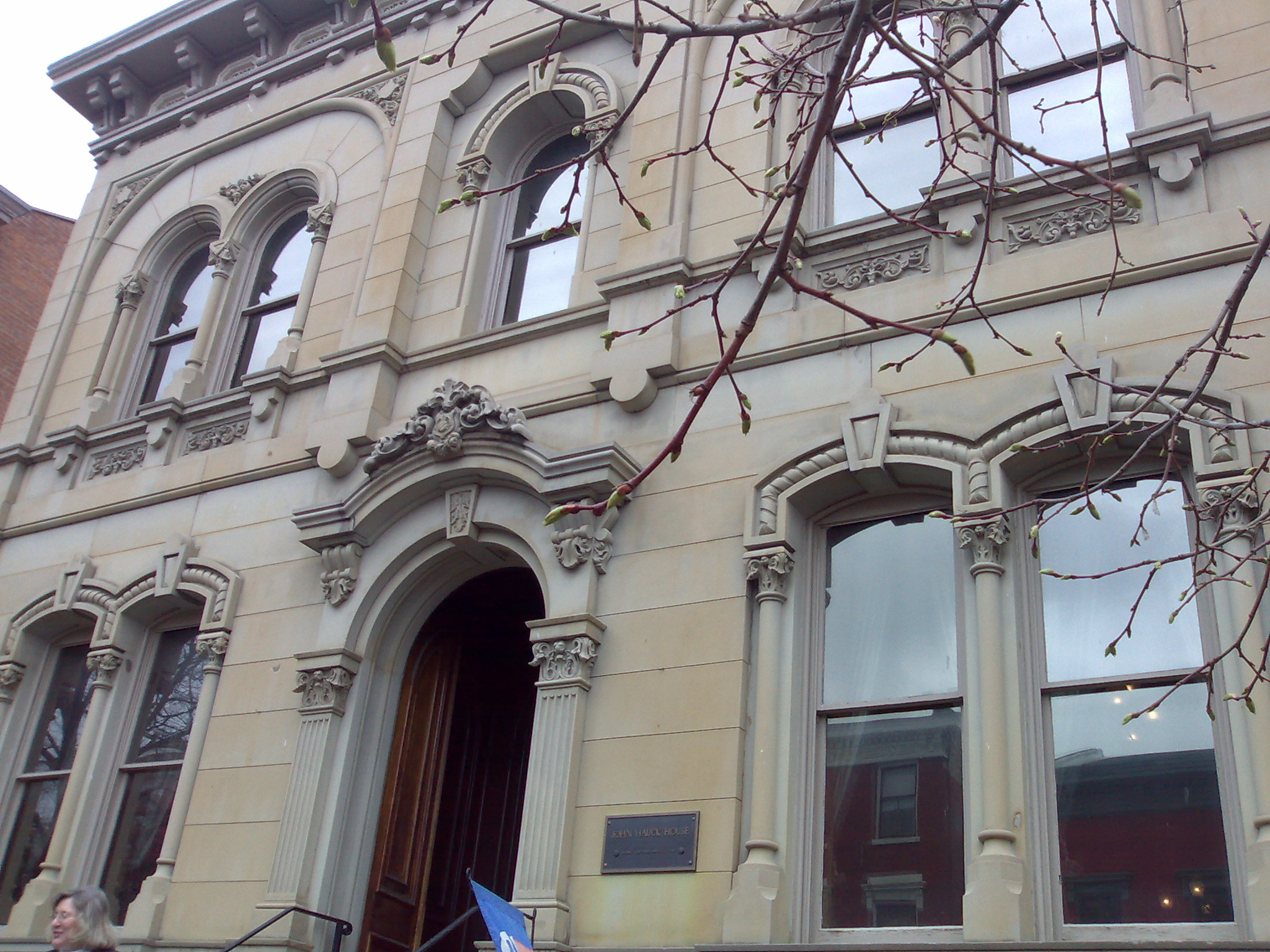
- Location: 812 Dayton Street, Cincinnati, Ohio 45214
- Coordinates: 39°07′06″N 84°31′39″W

The John Hauck House is an Italianate mansion located in the Dayton Street Historic District in the Old West End Neighborhood of Cincinnati, Ohio. It was built in 1870. The Hauck House has a striking façade of carved stone, and the spacious rooms have intricately painted ceilings, floors of parquet wood in elaborate patterns, marble mantels, and massive woodwork.

John Hauck (1829–1896) was a German immigrant who established a prosperous Cincinnati brewery. The museum was established to promote an understanding of daily life and customs in late 19th-century urban Cincinnati through the preservation and interpretation of the Hauck House.

The residence had operated as a historic house museum and closed in 2006. It is now the offices for Cincinnati Preservation, a non-profit dedicated to the preservation, advocacy and celebration of historic preservation and historic resources in greater Cincinnati.
