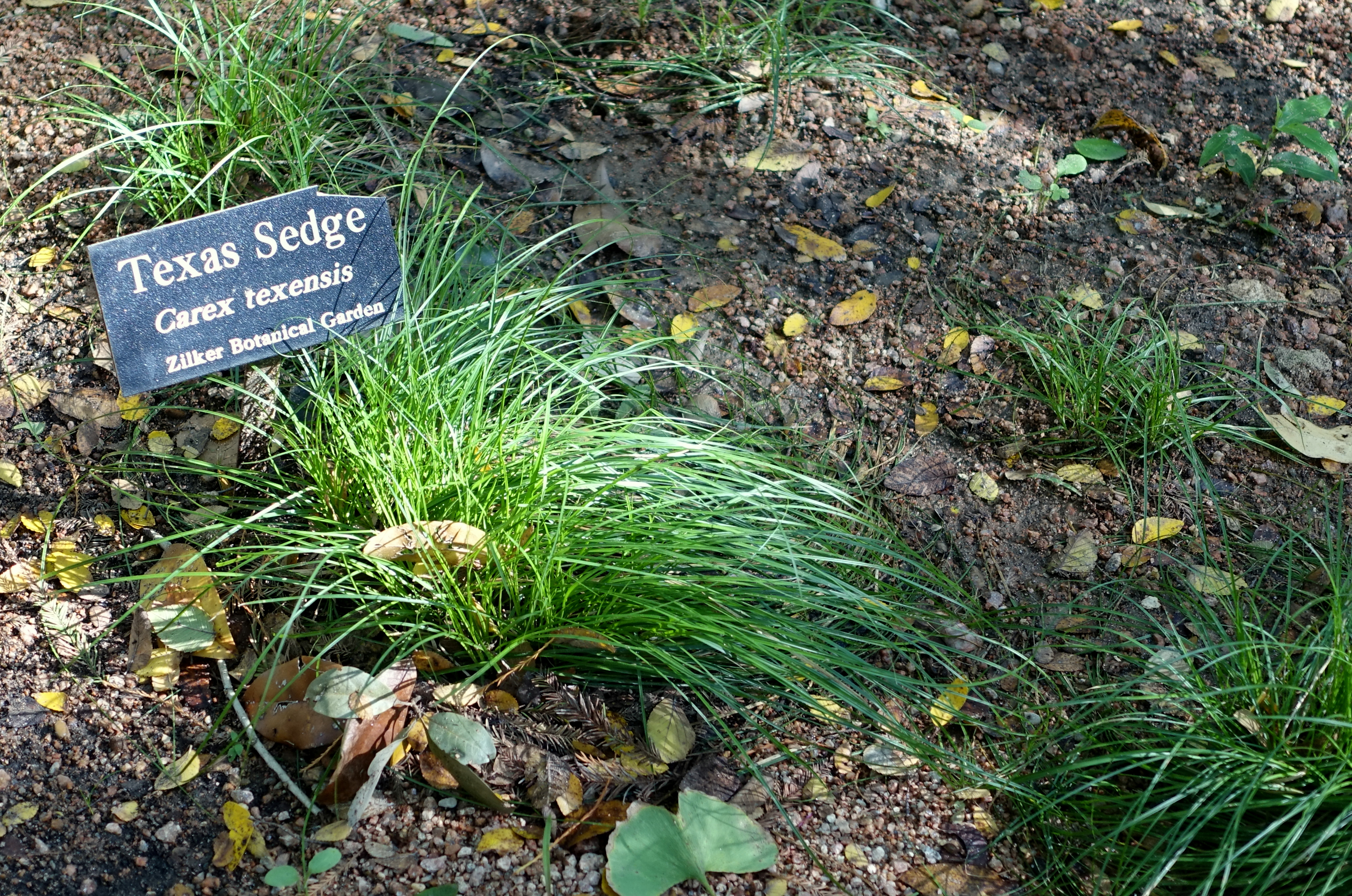
- At the Zilker Botanical Garden in Austin, Texas

Scientific classification
- Kingdom: Plantae
- Clade: Tracheophytes
- Clade: Angiosperms
- Clade: Monocots
- Clade: Commelinids
- Order: Poales
- Family: Cyperaceae
- Genus: Carex
- Section: Carex sect. Phaestoglochin
- Species: C. texensis

Binomial name
- Carex texensis (Torr. ex L.H.Bailey) L.H.Bailey

= Carex texensis =

Species of grass-like plant

Carex texensis, the Texas sedge, is a species of flowering plant in the sedge family, Cyperaceae. It is endemic to the eastern, central, and southern United States.

Its culms are 10–30 cm (3.9–11.8 in) in height, and 0.5–1 mm (1/64–3/64 in) wide basally to 0.4–0.5 mm (1/64–1/64 in) wide distally. The leaves are green with the widest leaf blades 1–1.7 mm (3/64–1/16 in) wide.
