= San Francisco Flower & Garden Show =

The San Francisco Flower & Garden Show is an annual public show serving the northern California, USA region. Attendance ranges from 25,000 - 30,000. The show is five days long, running Wednesday through Sunday, and is typically held in March. The show consists of three main components: approximately 15 display gardens ranging from 500 to 1,500 sq. ft. in size, educational displays, vendors promoting and selling garden-related products, and free seminars. Seminar speakers include garden and design experts from the U.S. West Coast.

Two large flower shows that preceded the San Francisco Flower & Garden Show in northern California were the Oakland Spring Flower Show which was produced by the California Association of Nurserymen from 1930 to 1978 (with a three-year hiatus from 1943 to 1945 because of World War II). In the early 1980s the rock ‘n roll impresario Bill Graham produced two annual flower shows at the Cow Palace.

The show as it appears today was started in 1986 as the San Francisco Landscape Garden Show by volunteers for the Friends of Recreation and Parks in San Francisco as a fundraiser for that organization (in 2006 the organization's name changed to San Francisco Parks Trust). The first show featured a tribute garden to San Francisco landscape architect, Thomas Dolliver Church (1902-1978), designed by Pam-Anela Messenger. For its first eleven years (1986-1997) the show held at Ft. Mason in San Francisco. In 1997 Salmon Bay Events, the Seattle-based company owned by Duane and Alice Kelly that had started the Northwest Flower & Garden Show, acquired the San Francisco Landscape Garden Show, changed its name to the San Francisco Flower & Garden Show, and moved the show from Ft. Mason to the Cow Palace. For the next eleven years (1998-2008) it was held at the Cow Palace.

In 2009, Salmon Bay moved the show to the San Mateo Event Center and announced it was closing the show. At the final hour, Special Events, a bay area tent rental company in Livermore, CA owned by Weston Cook, and partner Steve Cannon stepped in and acquired the show.

Still America's third largest show if its kind, the show was acquired by business partners Sherry Larsen of Larsen Enterprises, and Maryanne Lucas, Founder and executive director of Kids Growing Strong, on May 1, 2013. The show is scheduled to again be held at the San Mateo Event Center in 2017.
