= Cincinnati Flower Show =

Horticultural exhibition in Ohio, U.S.

The Cincinnati Flower Show is a horticultural exhibition held in Cincinnati, Ohio. It is organized by the Cincinnati Horticultural Society. The show was not held from 2011 through 2014, but returned in 2015. It was not held after 2016.
