= Forbes Travel Guide =

Restaurant and hotel rating system

- Company type: Private
- Founded: 1958
- Headquarters: Atlanta, Georgia, United States
- CEO: Hermann Elger
- Industry: Travel and hospitality
- Website: www.forbestravelguide.com

Forbes Travel Guide (formerly known as Mobil Guide or Mobil Travel Guide) is a star rating service and online travel guide for hotels, restaurants and spas. In 2011, Forbes Travel Guide published its last set of guidebooks and, on November 15, 2011, launched its new online home, ForbesTravelGuide.com, which covers numerous international destinations, including Hong Kong, Macau, Beijing, Shanghai, Singapore, Mexico, the Caribbean, Latin America, Japan, Thailand and London. ForbesTravelGuide.com combines Forbes Travel Guide's Five-Star travel ratings system with insights and perspectives from Forbes Travel Guide's own inspectors.

== History ==
Founded by Mobil and Simon & Schuster in 1958, Forbes Travel Guide is the oldest travel guide in the United States. Ratings are given by anonymous, paid staff members in stars (five-star, four-star or recommended ratings), based on objective criteria. A Forbes Travel Guide five-star rating is a considerable honor, with only 323 hotels, 102 spas and 74 restaurants receiving the top honor in 2022. The ratings serve as a certification mark, in that Mobil had registered trademarks for the phrases and designs indicating each star rating level, and allowed only rated establishments to display them.

Initially, guides were regional and limited to the United States and Canada. The first, issued in 1958, covered five states in the Southwest and South Central United States. In 1960, this guide was revised and volumes covering the Northeastern States, the Great Lakes, and California and the West were introduced. Guides covering the Middle Atlantic States and the Northwestern states were introduced in 1962. In 1965, a guide for the Southeastern States was introduced, although only one state covered by this volume, Tennessee, had any Mobil service stations.

Five-star restaurants in the United States:

Restaurant	Chef	City	Year(s)
21	Yves Ploneis	New York	1966
Perino's	Attilio Balzano	Los Angeles	1966
Ernie's	Paul Quiaud	San Francisco	1966
The Maisonette	Pierre Adrian	Cincinnati	1966
Pigall's	Maurice Gorodesky	Cincinnati	1966
Maxim's	Daniel Bouche	Chicago	1966
Brennan's	Paul Blange	New Orleans	1966
Cafe Chauveron	Albert Heintz	New York	1966-
Gourmet Room	Vito Lacaputo	Cincinnati	1970-

Later, the number of volumes was expanded, as regions covered by the guide shrank. For instance, California was covered by two volumes, one for the north and one for the south. City guides also followed.

By 1975 Rand McNally began publishing the Mobil Travel Guides. In 1988, Simon & Schuster's Prentice Hall division acquired the travel books division of Rand McNally. Fodor's, a division of Random House, began publishing the guides in 1995. In 2001, Mobil Travel Guide was spun off as a separate company, with ExxonMobil and publisher Publications International as an investor.

In 2008, Forbes Travel Guide launched the international star ratings program for hotels and spas with the release of the inaugural Forbes Travel Guide Beijing and Forbes Travel Guide Hong Kong and Macau. Published in print by ExxonMobil Travel Publications, until 2011, the guide was published online by HowStuffWorks.com.

In October 2009, ExxonMobil licensed the brand to the Five Star Ratings Corporation, which is owned by internet entrepreneur and WebMD founder Jeff Arnold. Five Star Travel Corporation entered into a licensing agreement with Forbes Media, and renamed the Star Awards and guidebook series, Forbes Travel Guide. Forbes Travel Guide's new online home, ForbesTravelGuide.com, was launched in 2011, which marked the last year of publication of the traditional printed guidebook series.

In 2019, Forbes Travel Guide formed an exclusive partnership with Jet Linx Aviation, becoming the guide's first partner in the private aviation industry.

== Star ratings ==
The Mobil Travel Guide star ratings provided ratings and reviews of hotels, restaurants and spas on a scale of one star (average to good) to five stars (one of the best in the country) starting in 1958. Forbes Travel Guide has continued the five-star ratings with ratings categories of five-star, four-star and recommended, and has a team of inspectors who anonymously evaluate properties against proprietary standards.

Forbes Travel Guide - 2019 star award winners by country
Five-star		Four-star		Recommended		Total	
United States	151	United States	444	United States	213	United States	808
China	77	China	105	China	33	China	215
United Kingdom	16	Canada	36	Italy	19	United Kingdom	58
France	13	United Kingdom	29	United Kingdom	13	Canada	53
Mexico	12	Mexico	27	Canada	11	Italy	52
Italy	10	Japan	26	France	10	Mexico	49
Japan	7	Italy	23	Mexico	10	France	42
Singapore	7	United Arab Emirates	23	Japan	9	Japan	42
Canada	6	Indonesia	21	Spain	8	United Arab Emirates	33
Switzerland	5	France	19	Portugal	7	Indonesia	30
Others	39	Others	150	Others	115	Others	312
Total	343	Total	903	Total	448	Total	1694
