= Mount Airy Forest =

- Mt Airy Forest
- U.S. National Register of Historic Places
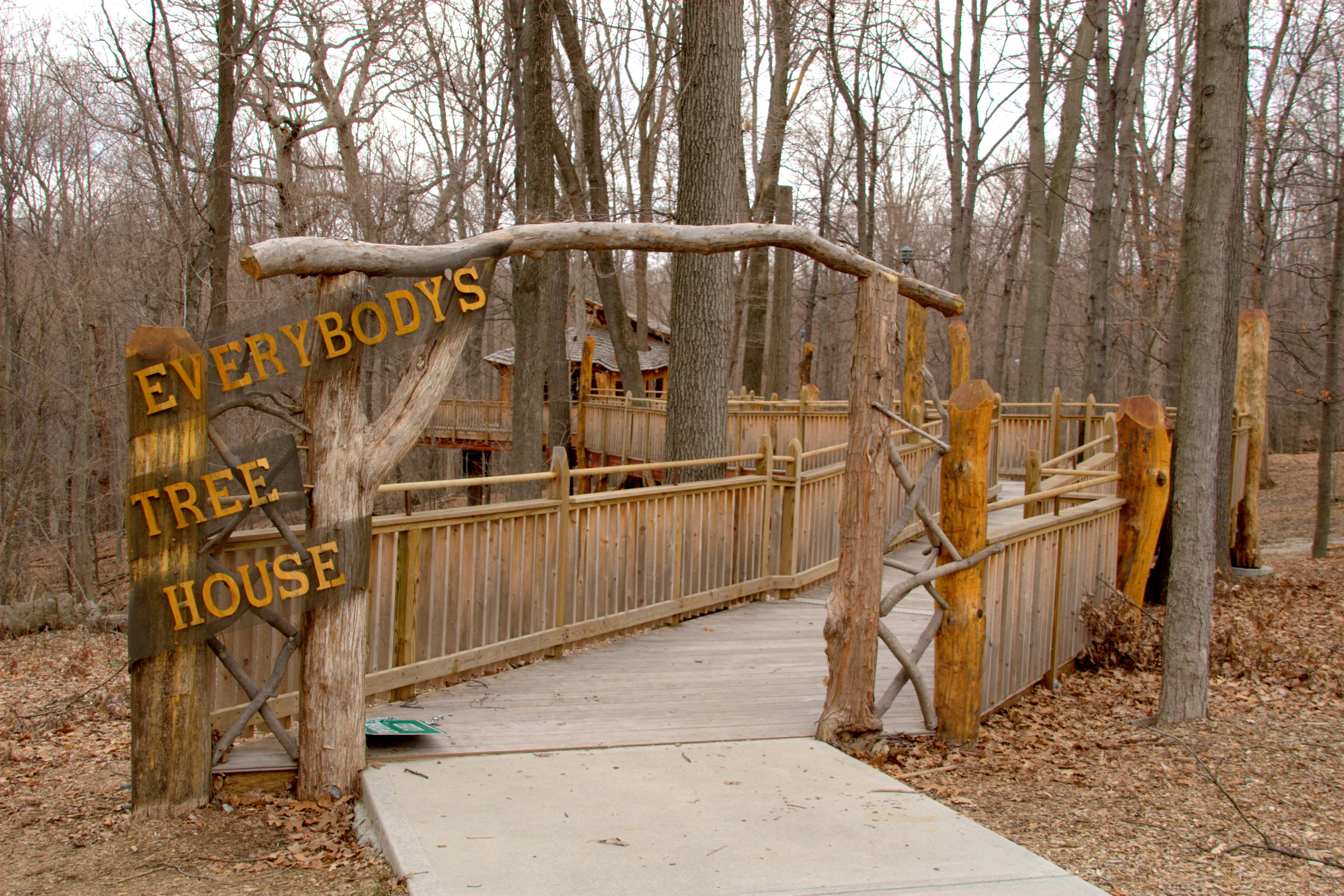
- Tree house in Mt. Airy Forest

- Location within Ohio
- Location: 5083 Colerain Avenue, Cincinnati, Ohio
- Coordinates: 39°10′46.86″N 84°33′57.64″W
- Area: 1,471 acres (595 ha)
- Built: 1911
- MPS: Historic Resources of the Cincinnati Park and Parkway System (1817-1959)
- NRHP reference No.: 10000191
- Added to NRHP: April 13, 2010

The Mount Airy Forest, in Cincinnati, Ohio, was established in 1911. It was one of the earliest, if not the first, urban reforestation project in the United States. With nearly 1,500 acres (6.1 km^{2}), it's the largest park in Cincinnati's park system.

== History ==
The originally forested land was cleared for agricultural use in the 19th century, but years of poor grazing and agricultural practices led to severe erosion and poor soil composition. As quoted in a 1914 Cincinnati Times-Star editorial, a farmer facetiously remarked that his farm (in Westwood) "was a good one when he first took it up but that since he had cleared off all the trees it had slid down the creek and was to be found somewhere in the neighborhood of New Orleans."

According to the National Park Service:

Established in 1911, the Mount Airy Forest covers an impressive 1459 acres and includes natural areas, planned landscapes, buildings, structures, and landscape features. The numerous hiking trails, bridle paths, walls, gardens, pedestrian bridges, and various other improvements within Mount Airy Forest reflect the ambitious park planning and development that took place in Cincinnati in the early-to-mid-20th century. Conceived as the nation's first urban reforestation project, the park has developed over the years—especially during the Depression and post-World War II period- into a park with a variety of areas, spaces and structures designed to accommodate recreational, social, and educational activities. Today it continues to offer a large expanse of protected land within the city limits where the public can enjoy the richness and diversity of nature.

In the largest reforestation program undertaken by a city seen until that time, the barren land was restored to a park largely in the 1930s by the Civilian Conservation Corps (CCC). The rustic CCC structures are still standing and are listed on the National Register of Historic Places. The park now includes 700 acres of reforested hardwoods, 200 acres of forested evergreens, 269 acres of wetlands, 170 acres of meadows, and a 120-acre arboretum. A wheelchair accessible treehouse was built in 2006.

The park was listed on the U.S. National Register of Historic Places on April 13, 2010. The listing was announced as the featured listing in the National Park Service's weekly list of April 23, 2010.

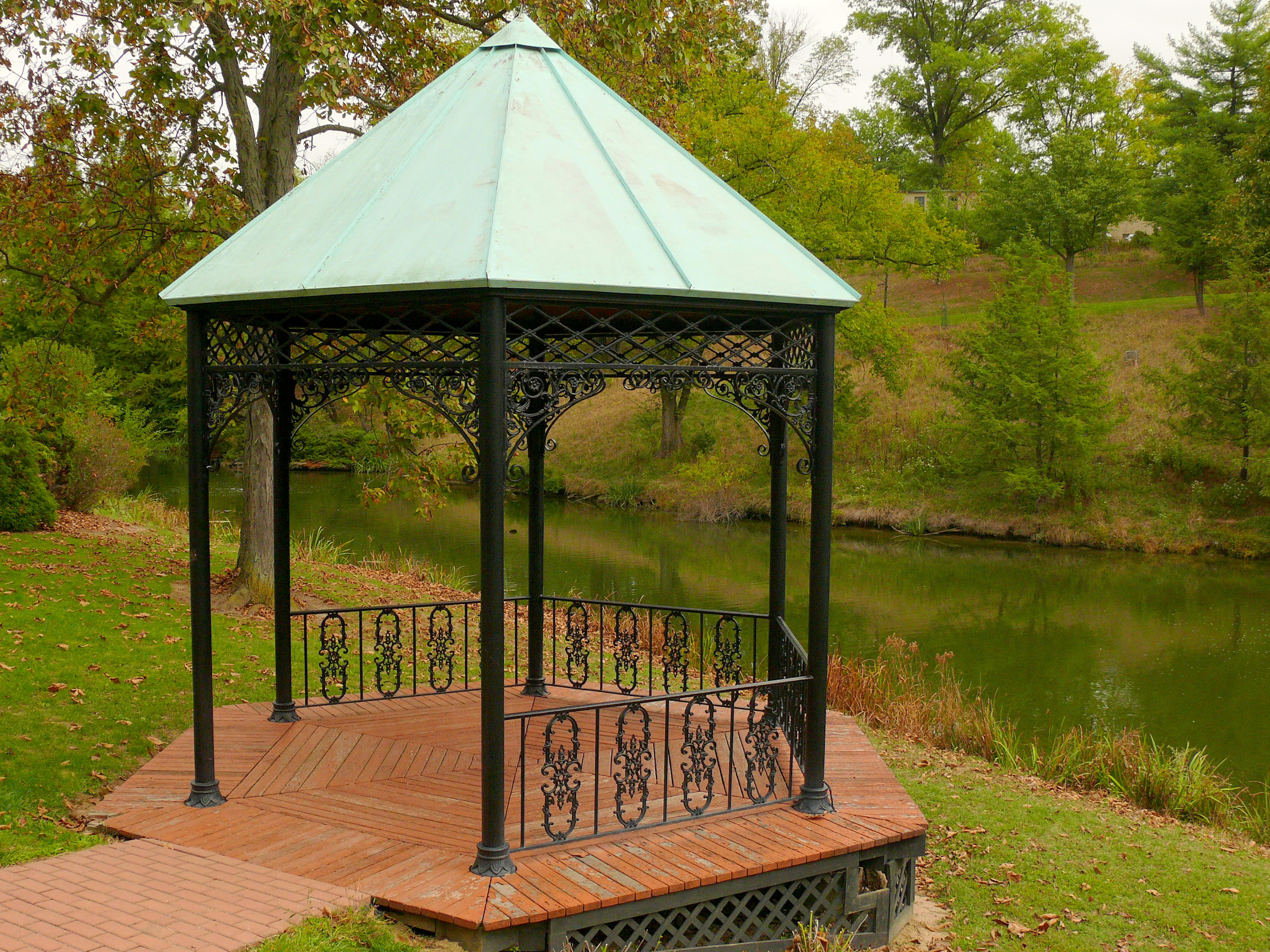
Gazebo in Mt. Airy Forest Arboretum

== Amenities ==
The park offers hiking trails, an 18-hole disc golf course, and a 2-acre (0.81 ha) dog park.
