= Hauck Botanic Gardens =

Coordinates: 39.1296°N 84.5003°W

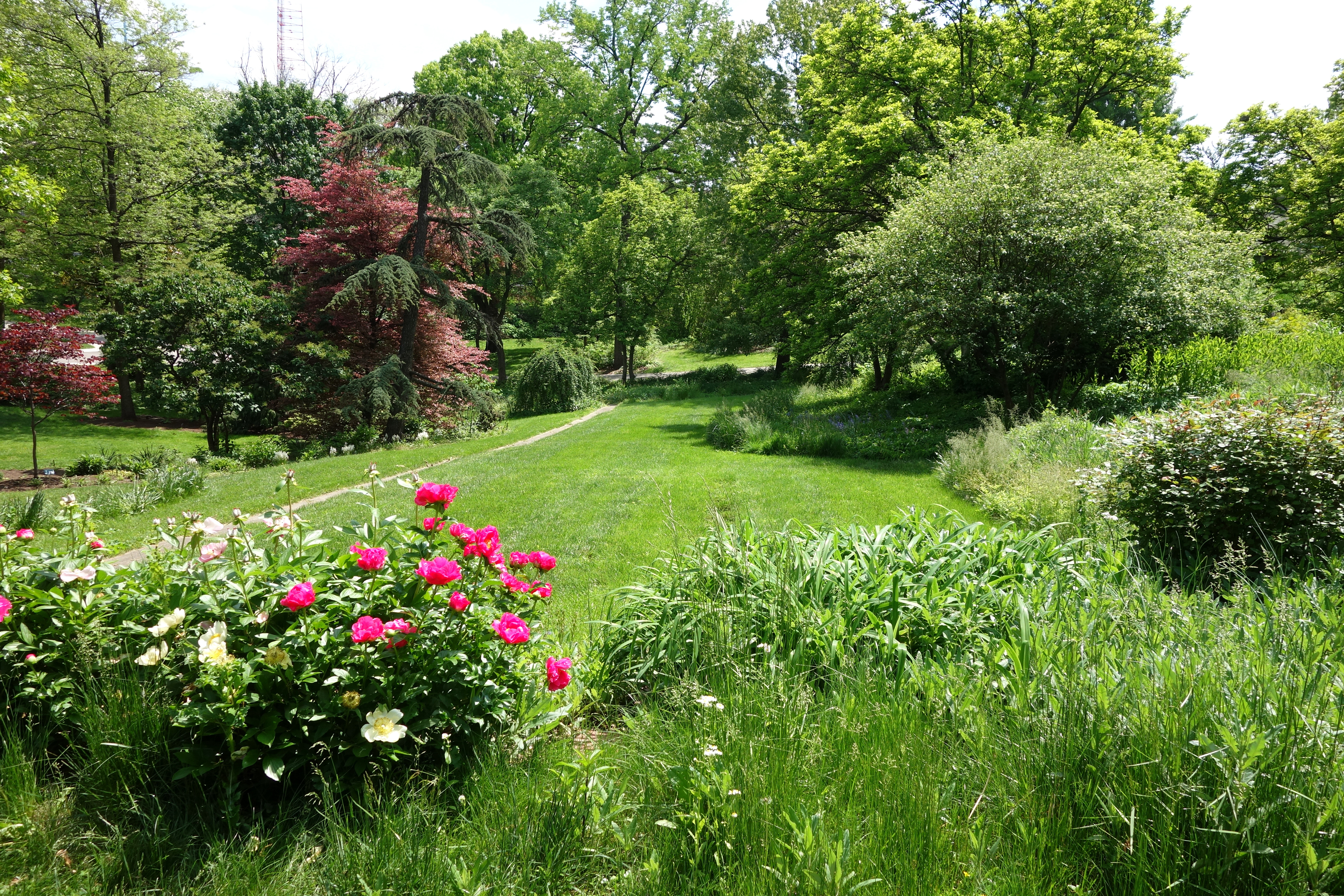
Hauck Botanic Gardens

The Hauck Botanic Gardens (8 acres) are horticultural gardens located at 2715 Reading Road, Cincinnati, Ohio, USA, on the former estate of Cornelius J. Hauck (1893-1967). They are open daily without charge. Hauck planted some 900 varieties of trees and shrubs on the grounds, most of which are now owned and maintained by the Cincinnati Park Board, with the remainder maintained by the Civic Garden Center. The grounds also include the Gibson-Hauck House (built in 1856), now headquarters of the Cincinnati Horticultural Society, and an English tea house replicating a building from the 1939 New York World's Fair.

== References and external links ==
- Cincinnati Parks: Hauck Botanic Gardens
- Civic Garden Center description and map
- A Walk in the Park: Hauck Botanic Gardens
