= University Heights, Ohio =

- City
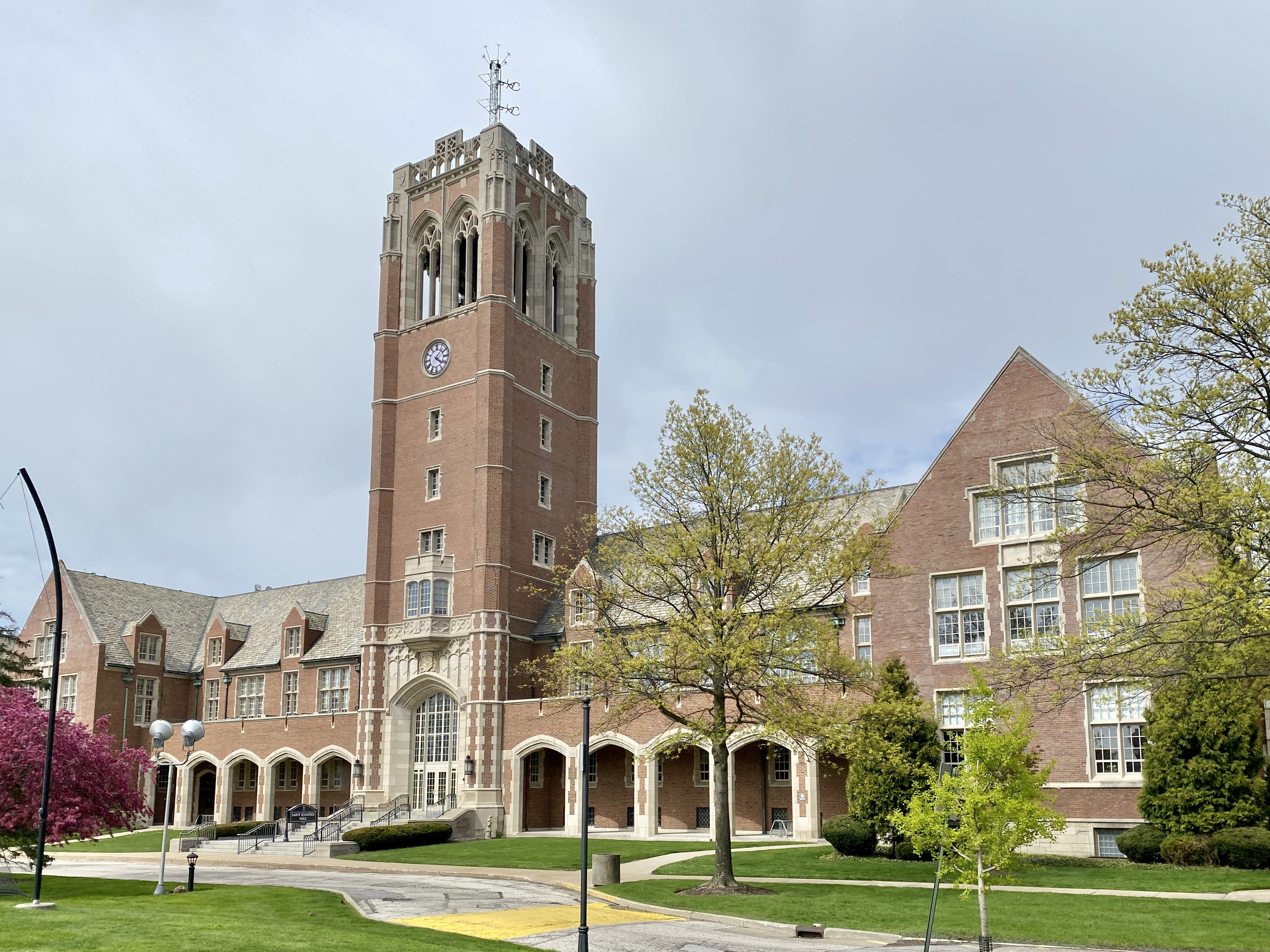
- John Carroll University
- Motto: "City of Beautiful Homes"
- Interactive map of University Heights, Ohio
- Location within Ohio Location within the United States
- Coordinates: 41°29′42″N 81°32′13″W
- Country: United States
- State: Ohio
- County: Cuyahoga

Government
  - Mayor: Michele Weiss

Area
  - Total: 1.83 sq mi (4.73 km^{2})
  - Land: 1.83 sq mi (4.73 km^{2})
  - Water: 0 sq mi (0.00 km^{2})
- Elevation: 1,027 ft (313 m)

Population (2020)
  - Total: 13,914
  - Density: 7,618.6/sq mi (2,941.54/km^{2})
- Time zone: UTC−5 (Eastern (EST))
  - Summer (DST): UTC−4 (EDT)
- ZIP Codes: 44118, 44122
- Area code: 216
- FIPS code: 39-78932
- GNIS feature ID: 1065413
- Website: www.universityheights.com

University Heights is a city in Cuyahoga County, Ohio, United States. The population was 13,914 as of the 2020 census. Located 8 miles (13 km) from downtown Cleveland, it is a suburb of the Cleveland metropolitan area.

University Heights is closely tied to neighboring Cleveland Heights, with the two sharing a school system, library system, post office and ZIP Code, some city services, and local media outlets. With about half the population under the age of 30, University Heights is home to one of the youngest communities in the region, including both students and families. It borders Beachwood to the east, Cleveland Heights to the west, South Euclid to the north and Shaker Heights to the south.

== History ==
Originally part of the Warrensville Township, University Heights was incorporated as Idlewood Village in 1908. It adopted its present name in the mid-1920s, when John Carroll University was anticipated to move into the area. John Carroll attracted massive growth and University Heights soon became recognized as a city in 1940.

== Geography ==
University Heights is located at 41°29′42″N 81°32′13″W (41.495019, −81.536864). According to the United States Census Bureau, the city has a total area of 1.82 square miles (4.71 km^{2}), all land.

Both branches of Dugway Brook rise in University Heights, on or near the campus of John Carroll University. All of the brook within the city was culverted in the early 20th century and now flows under the pavement. Meadowbrook Boulevard traces the winding course of the upper west branch.

== Demographics ==
Historical population
Census	Pop.	Note	%±
1910	221		—
1920	131		−40.7%
1930	2,237		1,607.6%
1940	5,981		167.4%
1950	11,566		93.4%
1960	16,641		43.9%
1970	17,055		2.5%
1980	15,401		−9.7%
1990	14,790		−4.0%
2000	14,146		−4.4%
2010	13,539		−4.3%
2020	13,914		2.8%

The median income for a household in the city was $72,519, and the median income for a family was $88,892. The per capita income for the city was $30,081. About 6.2% of the total population were below the poverty line. Of the city's population over the age of 25, 67.0% hold a bachelor's degree or higher, and 90.2% spoke English, 2.1% Spanish, 4.2% Yiddish, 1.8% Hebrew, and 1.7% Russian at home.

=== Racial and ethnic composition ===
University Heights city, Ohio – Racial and ethnic composition Note: the US Census treats Hispanic/Latino as an ethnic category. This table excludes Latinos from the racial categories and assigns them to a separate category. Hispanics/Latinos may be of any race.
Race / Ethnicity (NH = Non-Hispanic)	Population			Percentage		
Race / Ethnicity (NH = Non-Hispanic)	2000	2010	2020	2000	2010	2020
White alone (NH)	10,532	9,497	9,638	74.45%	70.15%	69.27%
Black or African American alone (NH)	2,901	3,120	2,953	20.51%	23.04%	21.22%
Native American or Alaska Native alone (NH)	14	13	6	0.10%	0.10%	0.04%
Asian alone (NH)	239	319	314	1.69%	2.36%	2.26%
Native Hawaiian or Pacific Islander alone (NH)	6	3	4	0.04%	0.02%	0.03%
Other race alone (NH)	34	20	127	0.24%	0.15%	0.91%
Mixed race or Multiracial (NH)	199	193	412	1.41%	1.43%	2.96%
Hispanic or Latino (any race)	221	374	460	1.56%	2.76%	3.31%
Total	14,146	13,539	13,914	100.00%	100.00%	100.00%

=== 2020 census ===
As of the 2020 census, University Heights had a population of 13,914. The median age was 30.1 years. 23.8% of residents were under the age of 18 and 13.2% of residents were 65 years of age or older. For every 100 females there were 92.7 males, and for every 100 females age 18 and over there were 89.5 males age 18 and over.

100.0% of residents lived in urban areas, while 0.0% lived in rural areas.

There were 4,843 households in University Heights, of which 32.2% had children under the age of 18 living in them. Of all households, 47.2% were married-couple households, 17.2% were households with a male householder and no spouse or partner present, and 30.5% were households with a female householder and no spouse or partner present. About 29.0% of all households were made up of individuals and 11.4% had someone living alone who was 65 years of age or older.

There were 5,266 housing units, of which 8.0% were vacant. The homeowner vacancy rate was 2.1% and the rental vacancy rate was 8.9%.

Racial composition as of the 2020 census
Race	Number	Percent
White	9,758	70.1%
Black or African American	2,993	21.5%
American Indian and Alaska Native	17	0.1%
Asian	318	2.3%
Native Hawaiian and Other Pacific Islander	4	0.0%
Some other race	233	1.7%
Two or more races	591	4.2%
Hispanic or Latino (of any race)	460	3.3%

=== 2010 census ===
As of the census of 2010, there were 13,539 people, 4,810 households, and 3,011 families residing in the city. The population density was 7,439.0 inhabitants per square mile (2,872.2/km^{2}). There were 5,248 housing units at an average density of 2,883.5 per square mile (1,113.3/km^{2}). The racial makeup of the city was 71.8% White, 23.1% African American, 0.1% Native American, 2.4% Asian, 0.9% from other races, and 1.6% from two or more races. Hispanic or Latino people of any race were 2.8% of the population.

There were 4,810 households, of which 31.9% had children under the age of 18 living with them, 48.9% were married couples living together, 10.9% had a female householder with no husband present, 2.8% had a male householder with no wife present, and 37.4% were non-families. Of all households, 29.1% were made up of individuals, and 10% had someone living alone who was 65 years of age or older. The average household size was 2.48 and the average family size was 3.11.

The median age in the city was 30.7 years. 22.7% of residents were under the age of 18; 19.7% were between the ages of 18 and 24; 25.8% were from 25 to 44; 20.1% were from 45 to 64; and 11.7% were 65 years of age or older. The gender makeup of the city was 47.7% male and 52.3% female.

=== 2000 census ===
In 2000, there were 5,163 households, out of which 29.3% had children under the age of 18 living with them, 52.9% were married couples living together, 9.3% had a female householder with no husband present, and 35.7% were non-families. Of all households 29.9% were made up of individuals, and 11.7% had someone living alone who was 65 years of age or older. The average household size was 2.37 and the average family size was 2.99.

In the city, the population was spread out, with 20.8% under the age of 18, 18.9% from 18 to 24, 27.8% from 25 to 44, 19.1% from 45 to 64, and 13.4% who were 65 years of age or older. The median age was 32 years. For every 100 females, there were 89.2 males. For every 100 females age 18 and over, there were 85.2 males.

== Government ==
University Heights has had a strong mayor-council government since 1941.

The city's mayors have been:

1. A. R Silsby 1907–1910 (first mayor of Idlewood)
2. Michael Scheinder 1910–1913
3. Oscar F. Alexander 1914
4. A. R Silsby 1914–1915
5. John J. Howard 1916–1941
6. Earl E. Aurelius 1941–1965
7. Irving W. Konigsberg 1966–1977
8. Beryl E. Rothschild 1978–2009 (first female and longest-serving mayor)
9. Susan K. Infeld 2010–2017
10. Michael Dylan Brennan 2018–2025
11. Michele Weiss 2026—

== Education ==
Public education in the city of University Heights is provided by the Cleveland Heights-University Heights City School District. Located in University Heights are Gearity Early Childhood Center, Cleveland Heights High School and Gearity Professional Development School. Further private schools include Gesu Catholic School and the Bellefaire JCB, which provides preschool programs, childcare, counseling and education for children.

University Heights is home to John Carroll University, a private Jesuit university with an enrollment of approximately 3,500 students.
