= Albert Davis Taylor =

American landscape architect (1883–1951)

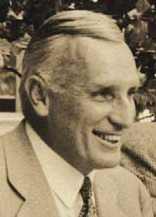
- A.D. Taylor in 1937
- Born: July 8, 1883; Carlisle, Massachusetts, United States
- Died: January 8, 1951 (aged 67); Cleveland, Ohio
- Burial place: Riverside Cemetery
- Other name: A. D. Taylor
- Education: Boston College, A.B. (1905); College of Agriculture at Cornell University, M.L.A. (1906)
- Occupations: Landscape architect; author
- Notable work: Alms Park; Ault Park; Boys Town, Nebraska; Mt. Echo Park; The Pentagon; Forest Hill Park

Albert Davis Taylor (July 8, 1883 – January 8, 1951) was an American landscape architect and author, notable for his many gardens and his promotion of garden shows. He designed parks and other public works, subdivisions and private estates, primarily in Ohio.

Taylor was born July 8, 1883, in Carlisle, Massachusetts to Nathaniel A. Davis and Ellen F. Taylor. He received his Bachelor of Arts (B.A.) from Boston College in 1905 and his Master of Landscape Architecture (M.L.A.) from the College of Agriculture at Cornell University in 1906, where he taught until 1908. He then joined the office of Warren H. Manning, where he was influenced by Manning’s informal and naturalistic approach to landscape design as he worked on such projects as Stan Hywet Hall in Akron.

In 1914 Taylor established his own practice in Cleveland, eventually opening a second office in Florida. His firm provided landscape design for the Van Sweringens’ Daisy Hill Estate in Cleveland, J. J. Emery’s Peterloon Estate in Cincinnati, the H. H. Timken Estate in Canton, and Julius Fleischmann’s Winding Creek Farm. The office also designed the Avondale subdivision in Akron and the Rookwood subdivision in Cincinnati. During the Great Depression, Taylor participated in a number of CWA projects. The following is a partial list of public works on which his firm worked:

- Alms Park, Cincinnati, Ohio
- Ault Park, Cincinnati, Ohio
- Baldwin Filtration Plant Reservoir, Cleveland, Ohio
- Boys Town, Nebraska
- Cumberland Park, Cleveland Heights, Ohio
- Mt. Echo Park, Cincinnati, Ohio
- Forest Hill Park, Cleveland Heights and East Cleveland, Ohio
- Marine Hospitals, Cleveland, Ohio, Baltimore, Maryland, and New Orleans, Louisiana
- The Pentagon, Virginia

Taylor helped found the landscape architecture program at Ohio State University and served as a non-resident professor in the program from 1916 to 1926. Notable among Taylor's many publications was his 1921 book, The Complete Garden. During the New Deal, Taylor was a consultant for the U.S. Forest Service, conducting a needs and requirements survey of the national forests in 1936. Increasing public use of national forests made it necessary to reevaluate the standard of landscape design throughout the system in an effort to preserve the natural aspects of the forest, while accommodating their use. Taylor's papers (1918–1942) are archived at the Bentley Historical Library, University of Michigan. A small collection of his drawings have been digitized and made available on the Knowlton Digital Library.

Taylor died January 8, 1951, in Cleveland, Ohio. He was buried at Riverside Cemetery in Cleveland.

== Sources ==
- Staff (1954) "Albert Davis Taylor, 1883-1951" The National Cyclopaedia of American Biography (Permanent series volume 39) James T. White & Co., New York, p. 316
- Birnbaum, Charles A. and Karson, Robin (eds.) (2000) "Albert Davis Taylor" Pioneers of American Landscape Design McGraw Hill, New York, pp. 390–395, ISBN 0-07-134420-9
- Robbins, Cane (29 March 1930) "On the Career of a Landscape Architect" Bystander pp. 13, 14 & 64
