= De Vinne =

De Vinne is a surname. Notable people with the surname include:

- Christine De Vinne (born 1949), American academic administrator
- Theodore Low De Vinne (1828–1914), American printer
