= Stadium Square Historic District =

- U.S. National Register of Historic Places
- U.S. Historic district
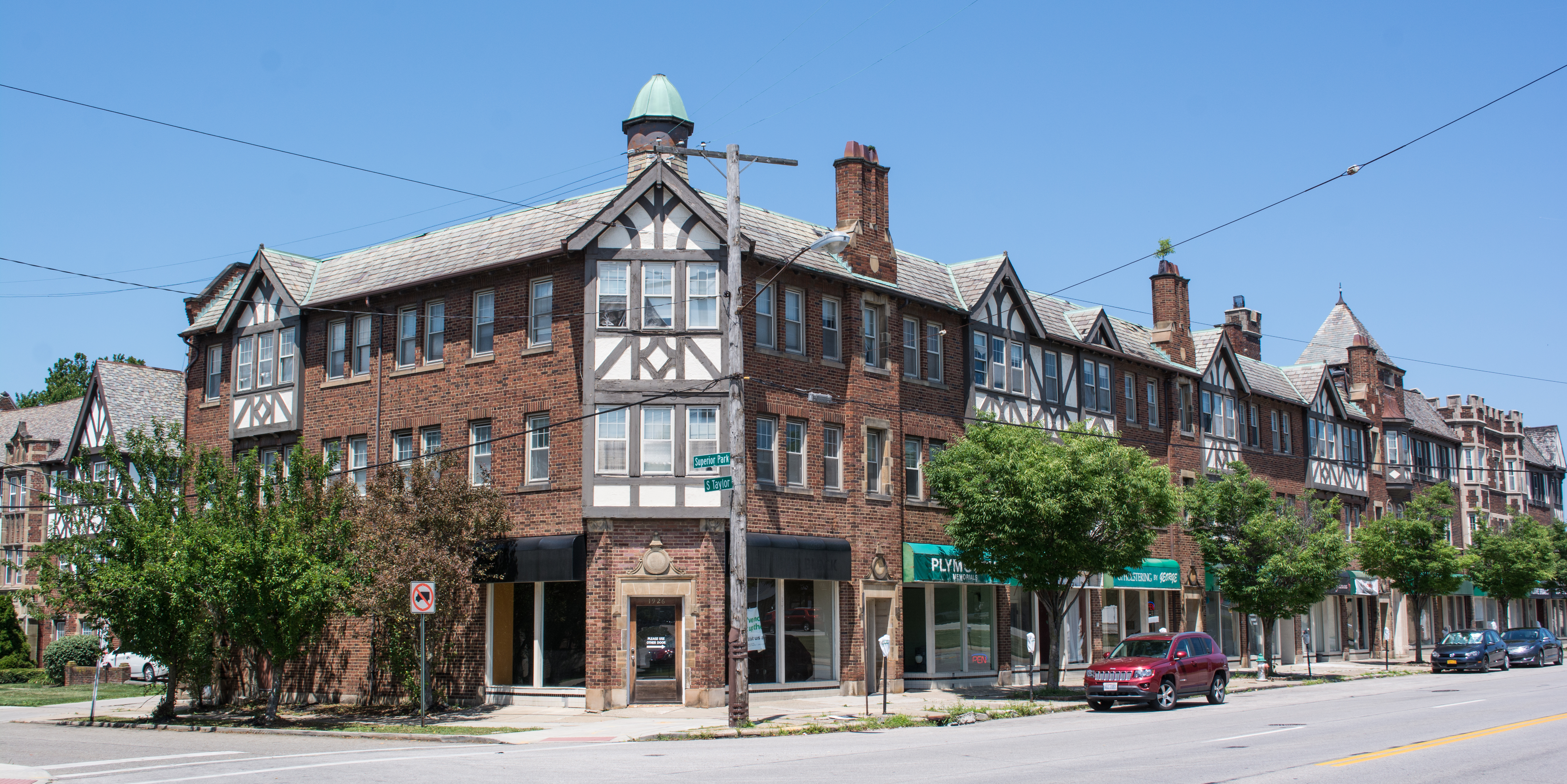
- 1912-1926 S. Taylor Road

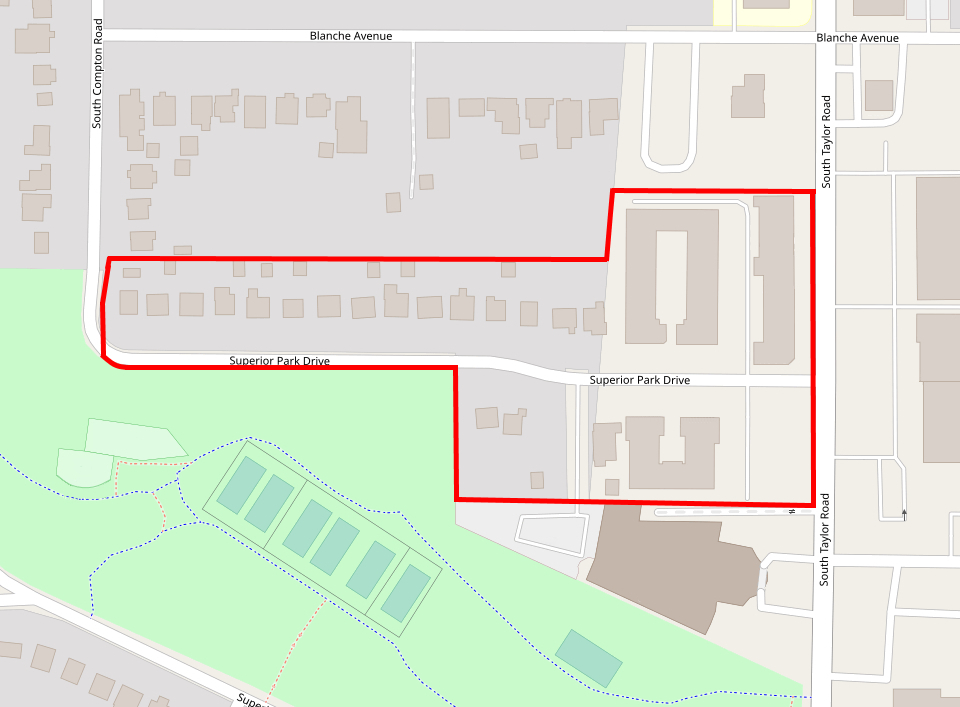
- Location: Cleveland Heights, Ohio, U.S.
- Coordinates: 41.507061°N 81.557156°W
- Area: 6.92 acres (0.0280 km^{2})
- Built: 1926 to 1929
- NRHP reference No.: 100005214
- Added to NRHP: April 27, 2020

The Stadium Square Historic District is a historic district located in Cleveland Heights, Ohio, in the United States. The district contains properties along the north and south sides of Superior Park Drive between S. Taylor and S. Compton Roads, as well as Taylor Tudor properties on S. Taylor Road at Superior Park Drive. The 6.92-acre (0.0280 km^{2}) site contains residential homes and mixed-use structures, all built beginning in 1926. Cleveland Heights proposed the construction of a football stadium on the site in 1927. The stadium was never built, and the historic district takes its name from the original name given the commercial complex. The Stadium Square Historic District is a largely undisturbed example of early 20th century Tudor Revival architecture.

The Stadium Square Historic District was added to the National Register of Historic Places (NRHP) in April 2020.

== Creation of the park ==
The area that is now the city of Cleveland Heights lies atop the Portage Escarpment, a major landform in North America which marks the boundary between the Till Plains and the Appalachian Plateau. The escarpment is cut by several large and small streams, including Dugway Brook, which have left numerous ravines and gorges. Until the late 1800s, the area remained largely timber and farmland, with a few orchards, quarries, and vineyards. There were no significant residential or retail clusters. About 1890, a town center began forming at what is now the intersection of Mayfield and Superior roads. The population of the area encompassed by Cleveland Heights voted in August 1900 to incorporate under state law as a hamlet. The population of about 1,500 grew quickly, and in 1903 incorporated as a village.

The West Branch of Dugway Brook arises near the intersection of Washington Blvd. and Edgerton Road. It largely parallels Washington Blvd. and Superior Road until it leaves Cleveland Heights. Where Cain Park is located in Cleveland Heights, the West Branch had cut a deep ravine. The valley was unsuitable for building purposes, although Euclid bluestone (a bluish-colored local sandstone) was quarried there and the ravine used as a garbage dump. (Note: The flat area of Cumberland Park close to Mayfield Road was owned by J.P. Preyer and his son, Emil. Emil Preyer intended to convert the family vineyards in this area into a development. He intended two lay out two north-south street, Preyer and Alvin. Only Preyer was built. Alvin Avenue, to the east of Preyer Avenue, was never constructed, and the site is now Cumberland Park.)

In May 1915, Cleveland Heights mayor Frank Cain won voter approval to issue $100,000 in bonds to purchase 100 acres (40 ha) of undeveloped area along the West Branch of Dugway Brook. This area became Cumberland Park and Cain Park. The West Branch of Dugway Brook that ran through Cumberland Park was culverted, and the ravine filled in. Cain Park's 22 acres (8.9 ha) remained wild, however. (Note: Although Cleveland Heights voters approved a $75,000 bond issue in 1925 to improve both Cain and Cumberland parks, these did not begin until October 1934.)

Some time in 1917 or early 1918, the voters of Cleveland Heights approved a $100,000 bond issue to extend Superior Road alongside the new parkland. (Note: At the time, Superior Road ended at its intersection with Lee Road. Rather than stop at Taylor Road, the extension continued to parallel Dugway Brook for half a block until it intersected with Washington Blvd., itself a major parkway.)Planning for the improved road began in May 1918.

Cleveland Heights was booming: By 1924, the population of the city had soared to just over 30,000. By 1927, the area on Taylor Road just north of Cedar Road was one of the fastest-growing in Cleveland Heights.

== Stadium proposal and construction of the first homes ==
In 1925, civic boosters in Cleveland Heights proposed constructing a 14,000-seat football stadium at the west end of the parkland acquired a decade earlier. That same year, local businessman Benjamin A. Roseman purchased a wooded tract of land west of Taylor Road and adjacent to the north side of Dugway Brook. He also purchased most of the block just to the east of this site, on the east side of Taylor Road.

Roseman convinced a group of local architects and home builders to form a company to buy the land and build the homes, and about November 10, 1925, the Superior Park Development Company was formed. Its incorporators were local architects Phil R. Brooke and George Howard Burrows, and local developers A.C. Weber, A.G. Weber, and William Wilkens. (Note: Brooke was previously the supervising architect who reviewed home designs and enforced building standards for the Van Sweringen brothers at their Shaker Heights and other developments. Burrows was the other partner in the Brooke & Burrows architectural film. The others were local developers.)

The Superior Park Development Co. purchased Roseman's 32 home sites on Superior Park Drive in March 1926. The company cut a dirt road, Superior Park Drive, through the center of the tract (connecting Taylor Road and Compton Road) in the winter of 1925-1926, and constructed electricity, fresh water, natural gas, and sewer lines to the subdivision at his own expense.

Covenants were attached to all the lots, placing restrictions on architectural style, building and material standards, and siting. All architects' plans had to be submitted to the development company for approval. These were restrictions similar to those implemented in Shaker Heights.

The company intended to build homes only on the north side of the street. Each home was to have seven or eight rooms, steam heat, tiled bathrooms, a home incinerator, and a two-car garage. Brooke and Burrows proposed that homes be of different construction type – some stucco, some Tudor Revival, some brick Colonial, some with shingle siding – but all the homes would fit into a general stylistic theme, and the price would be a moderate $20,000.

=== First failure of the stadium bond issue ===
The Cleveland Heights city council approved a bond issue to pay for the stadium, but felt that the public should have a say in the issuance of such a large debt. Although a majority of voters approved of the bond issue in a 1926 election, the issue felt 67 votes short of the 55 percent necessary for passage.

The local architectural firm of Brooke & Burrows designed each structure in the Tudor Revival style. The first 10 homes began construction on March 27, 1926, the second through eleventh lots on the west end of the north side of Superior Park Drive. The 10 initial homes neared completion in August 1926, and all were moderately priced at $18,000 to $25,000.

Paving of Superior Park Drive started in September 1926 and was finished the following May.

By the first week of September 1927, eight of the ten homes had been completed.

=== Final failure of the stadium bond issue ===
A $125,000 stadium bond issue went before the public again in November 1927, but this time failed to secure a majority. (Note: Also on the ballot was an $85,000 bond issue to improve Cumberland Park. This passed.)

All but two of the 10 homes initially built by Superior Park Development had been sold or leased by January 1928, despite a five-year recession in home-buying. Superior Park Development began construction on additional homes in the development in the spring of 1928.

== Building the business district ==
In November 1926, the establishment of a new business district on Taylor Road was announced. A syndicate led by E.I. Wolf & Son of Cleveland purchased the lot on the northwest corner of Taylor Rd. and DeSota Avenue, and announced the construction of a $70,000 stone building with six retail units.

=== First block ===
Benjamin Roseman was also head of Mera Realty Co., a real estate development firm founded in November 1924 by B.A. Feldman and Anna Miller.

In 1927, Roseman began construction on a three-story commercial structure on the northwest corner where Superior Park Drive met Taylor Road (now 1912-1926 S. Taylor Road). Local architect Maxwell H. Weis designed the $175,000 building, which had eight retail units on the first floor and 16 apartment units on the second and third floors. In securing the permits to erect the building, Roseman promised the city of Cleveland Heights that he would avoid a plain building. He met this promise by having Weis design his project in the Tudor Revival style. The structure was completed in February 1928.

=== Second block ===
As soon as the first commercial block was finished, Roseman announced construction of a similar structure on the southwest corner of Superior Park Drive and Taylor Road (now 1932-1946 S. Taylor Road). The $175,000 Tudor Revival building was almost identical to its northern neighbor, with eight retail spaces on the first floor and 16 apartments on the upper floors.

This second commercial "block" opened the first week of April 1928. All the retail units and nearly all the apartments were leased when it did.

Roseman announced plans to erect two more commercial "blocks" on the west side of Taylor Road in October 1928. He also said he was planning some commercial structures on the east side of the street as well.

The term "Stadium Square" was first used by the local news media to refer to this new business district on January 5, 1929. The Plain Dealer newspaper called it the "most complete and largest" commercial development in Cleveland Heights history.

=== Third block ===
Roseman began work on a third business building at 1908 Taylor Road, adjacent to his to the north side of his first commercial block. Construction began on January 3, 1929. This three-story structure had six retail units on the first floor and 12 apartment units on the two upper floors. It cost $150,000. Also designed by Maxwell Weis, this block was in the Tudor Revival style, but had several significant departures. These included a half-story turret on the south end beneath which was a bay window; merlons atop the center section; bay windows on the second and third floor at either side of the center section; and a gable at the north end of the building.

This final commercial block was completed about June 1, 1929.

== Apartment buildings ==
On April 1, 1928, Roseman began construction on apartment buildings just to the west of his two commercial blocks. Each building was a three-story, Tudor Revival structure with 40 units. The total cost of construction was estimated at $450,000. Because the building sites were medium-sized, Roseman built a $35,000, 50-car private garage on the east side of Taylor Road for use by those who rented apartments in his buildings.

Construction of the apartment building on the south side of Superior Park Drive was delayed, and began in the summer of 1928. By then, the number of units had increased to 42, and the cost of this building rose to $200,000. The building architect was Maxwell Norcross. By June, the cost of the building had risen to $300,000. The apartment house was almost complete by the first week of October 1928.

Roseman planned for a $400,000, 84-unit apartment building to go up on the north side of Superior Drive soon after construction started on the south side building. The architect of this three-story, U-shaped, Tudor Revival building was Max Weiss. By June 1928, the cost had risen to $450,000, and the number of units had dropped to 62. Construction began the second week of August 1928. As the building neared completion, the number of units was cut again to 54, bringing the cost down to $350,000. Weis also added garage space for 16 automobiles at the rear of the structure.

This north-side apartment building neared completion on May 1, 1929.

== Planned additions to the business district ==
January 1929 saw Roseman announce the construction of a commercial block and apartment building on Blanche Road (the street just north of Superior Park Drive). On the corner was his fourth three-story commercial building, intended to have eight storefronts and 16 apartment units. Just to the west of the corner commercial block, Roseman planned a three-story, 22 unit apartment building which cost $300,000. Also designed by Maxwell Weis, the apartment units were three, four, or five rooms each.

Roseman also planned to expand his business district to the east side of Taylor Road by erecting a half-block long, three-story structure at a cost of $500,000. It would have space for 15 stores, 45 to 50 apartments, a 1,500-seat movie theater, an automobile dealership, and a filling station. Behind the building, fronting Powell Avenue, would be a public three-story parking garage and a private three-story parking garage.

With the onset of the Great Depression in the United States in October 1929, Roseman never began construction on any of these planned projects. In late 1931, Roseman was forced to turn over his apartment buildings to his creditors. He turned over all his mixed-use business blocks in early 1932. Roseman's business fortunes turned around in late 1932, and his new Stadium Square Co. was able to buy back all of these properties.

Benjamin Roseman intended to build 22 storefronts on the corner of Blanche Avenue and Taylor Road in 1932, and on the east side of Taylor Road. The continuing economic crisis scuttled these plans. He scaled them back to just eight storefronts on the corner in June 1934, This was not built, either.

With his son, Ernest H. Roseman, Benjamin Roseman opened an appliance store at 1901 S. Taylor Road. Ernest built a brick, single-story commercial building with three storefronts at 1892-1896 S. Taylor Road.

== About the historic district ==
Each home in the historic district was constructed of brick, stucco, stone, and timber, and featured stone copings and quoins. The doors were thick planks bound together with iron bands and hung with wrought iron hinges. All homes had exterior finishings like grills and lanterns made of wrought iron. The roofing consisted of red cedar shingles stained with dye from Cabot Inc. of Chelsea, Massachusetts.

The apartment building on the north side of Superior Park Drive was divided in two. The eastern half at 3449 Superior Park Dr. was named Essex Hall. The western half at 3445 Superior Park Dr. was named Morely Hall. The apartment building in the south side of the street at 3436-3440 Superior Park Dr. was named Barclay Court.

== Other improvements ==
The success of Roseman's apartments and new business district led the Cleveland Railway streetcar company to extend its Cedar Road line from Lee Road to Taylor Road. This made Stadium Square directly accessible to downtown Cleveland. The company also extended its Mayfield Road line from Lee Road to Warrensville Center Road. The extensions of these two lines significantly boosted demand for housing in Stadium Square and other areas of Cleveland Heights.

After the construction of Roseman's business district, the portion of the city park east of Lee Road was informally known as "Stadium Park". The park was formally named Cain Park in May 1934, to honor long-time Cleveland Heights mayor Frank Cain.

== Renovations ==
The city won a $12,000 grant from the Ohio Historic Preservation Pipeline Initiative Grant from the state Development Services Agency (the state's economic development department) to assist it in filing for NRHP status.

The Taylor Tudor mixed-used structures consist of two buildings, one north and one south of Superior Park Road. Cuyahoga County foreclosed on the two properties due to unpaid property taxes in January 2018. The county then turned the properties over to the Cuyahoga County Land Bank. The Land Bank subsequently turned the south structure over to the city of Cleveland Heights.

== Bibliography ==
- Morton, Marion J. (2002). Cleveland Heights: The Making of An Urban Suburb. Charleston, S.C.: Arcadia Publishing. ISBN 9780738523842.
- Morton, Marion J. (2005). Cleveland Heights. Charleston, S.C.: Arcadia Publishing. ISBN 9780738533889.
- O'Donnell, Kara Hamley (Spring 2013). "Raising Cain Park" (PDF). View From The Overlook.
