= List of centenarians (medical professionals) =

The following is a list of centenarians – specifically, people who became famous as medical professionals – known for reasons other than their longevity. For more lists, see lists of centenarians.

All supercentenarians (above 110 years old)
Living

Name	Lifespan	Age	Reason for Notability
Elizabeth Bagshaw	1881–1982	100	Canadian physician and director of the first birth control clinic in Canada
Constantin Bălăceanu-Stolnici	1923–2023	100	Romanian neurologist
Joseph Barnes	1914–2017	102	Irish physician
Grace Barr-Kumarakulasinghe	1908–2013	104	Sri Lankan pediatrician
Aaron T. Beck	1921–2021	100	American psychiatrist
Myra Bennett	1890–1990	100	Canadian nurse
George Berci	1921–2024	103	Hungarian-American surgeon
Elisabeth Bing	1914–2015	100	German-born American physical therapist
Richard Bing	1909–2010	101	German-born American cardiologist
Wanda Błeńska	1911–2014	103	Polish physician and missionary
Hedda Bolgar	1909–2013	103	American psychoanalyst
Sadie Bonnell	1888–1993	105	British FANY ambulance driver who won the Military Medal
Geraldine Branch	1908–2016	107	American gynaecologist
Clifford Brewer	1913–2017	104	British surgeon
Christian Chenay	1921–2026	104	French general practitioner
Jacinto Convit	1913–2014	100	Venezuelan epidemiologist
Héctor Croxatto	1908–2010	102	Chilean physiologist
Deng Tietao	1916–2019	102	Chinese physician and academic
Leila Denmark	1898–2012	114	American pediatrician who helped develop the pertussis vaccine
Anthony F. DePalma	1904–2005	100	American orthopedic surgeon; father of film director Brian De Palma
Ian Douglas-Wilson	1912–2013	101	British physician
Carola B. Eisenberg	1917–2021	103	Argentine-American psychiatrist
Joel Elkes	1913–2015	101	Prussian-born American medical researcher
Ephraim Engleman	1911–2015	104	American rheumatologist
Sir Anthony Epstein	1921–2024	102	British pathologist and academic
Emmanuel Evans-Anfom	1919–2021	101	Ghanaian physician, scholar, university administrator and public servant
Gordon S. Fahrni	1887–1995	108	Canadian physician and expert on goitre
Loretta Ford	1920–2025	104	American nurse and academic
William Frankland	1912–2020	108	British allergist and immunologist
Sir George Godber	1908–2009	100	Chief Medical Officer of the United Kingdom
Charles Godfrey	1917–2022	104	Canadian physician and politician
Francesc Gras Salas	1921–2022	101	Spanish Ophthalmologist and writer
Walter Guralnick	1916–2017	100	American dentist
Norman Guthkelch	1915–2016	100	British-born American pediatric neurosurgeon
Philip D'Arcy Hart	1900–2006	106	British epidemiologist
Erich Häßler	1899–2005	106	German pediatrician
Shuntaro Hida	1917–2017	100	Japanese physician
Shigeaki Hinohara	1911–2017	105	Japanese physician
Edward Augustus Holyoke	1728–1829	100	American physician
Howard W. Jones	1910–2015	104	American gynecological surgeon and in vitro fertilization specialist
Sir Keith Jones	1911–2012	100	Australian medical practitioner and surgeon
Mavis Kelsey	1912–2013	101	American internist and clinic founder
David Morris Kern	1909–2013	103	American pharmacist and businessman
Fred Kummerow	1914–2017	102	German-born American physiologist
Martha Kyrle	1917–2017	100	Austrian physician
Ana Maria Lajusticia	1924–2024	100	Spanish biochemist and nutritionist
Ethel Lote	1920–2024	103	British nurse and yoga instructor
Margaret Morgan Lawrence	1914–2019	105	American psychiatrist, first black psychoanalyst in the US
Hannah Myrick	1871–1973	101/102	American superintendent of the New England Hospital for Women and Children
George Nagobads	1921–2023	101	American sports physician
Frances Oldham Kelsey	1914–2015	101	Canadian-born American pharmacologist
Lucy Ozarin	1914–2017	103	American military physician and psychiatrist
Sir Harry Platt, 1st Baronet	1886–1986	100	British orthopaedic surgeon, President of the Royal Society of Medicine and the Royal College of Surgeons of England
Wanda Półtawska	1921–2023	101	Polish psychiatrist
Ingeborg Rapoport	1912–2017	104	German pediatrician
Zus Ratulangi	1922–2025	102	Indonesian-Dutch pediatrician
Paul Rohmer	1876–1977	100	French pediatrician and biologist
Andrew Best Semple	1912–2013	101	British medical officer
Jennie Smillie Robertson	1878–1981	103	Canadian physician, first female surgeon in Canada
Su Hongxi	1915–2018	103	Chinese surgeon
Tang Yuhan	1913–2014	101	Hong Kong oncologist
Eva Tichauer	1918–2018	100	German doctor, author and Holocaust survivor
Stanley M. Truhlsen	1920–2021	101	American ophthalmologist
Howard Tucker	1922–2025	103	American neurologist
Fyodor Uglov	1904–2008	103	Russian surgeon
Agnès-Marie Valois	1914–2018	103	French nun and World War II nurse
Wang Shizhen	1916–2016	100	Chinese nuclear medicine physician
Ken Walker	1924–2025	101	Canadian obstetrician, gynecologist, and medical columnist
Ellsworth Wareham	1914–2018	104	American cardiothoracic surgeon
P. K. Warrier	1921–2021	100	Indian Ayurveda practitioner
James Whittico Jr.	1915–2018	102	American physician
Esther Wilkins	1916–2016	100	American dentist
Arvo Ylppö	1887–1992	104	Finnish pediatrician
