= Dugway =

Dugway may refer to:

- Dugway Proving Ground, a United States military weapons testing range in Utah
- Dugway, Utah, a census-designated place near the Dugway Proving Grounds
- Dugway Brook Watershed, a drainage basin in Cleveland, Ohio

== See also ==
- Moki Dugway, part of Utah State Route 261
