= Fred Kummerow =

German-American biochemist (1914–2017)

- Born: Friedrich August Kummerow; October 4, 1914; Berlin, Germany
- Died: May 31, 2017 (aged 102); Urbana, Illinois, United States
- Citizenship: American
- Education: Ph.D.
- Alma mater: University of Wisconsin–Madison
- Known for: showed link between trans-fatty acids and heart disease
- Spouse: Amy Kummerow (died 2012)
- Children: Max (son); Jean, Kay (daughters)
- Scientific career
- Fields: Biochemistry
- Workplaces: University of Illinois at Urbana–Champaign

Fred August Kummerow (October 4, 1914 – May 31, 2017) was a German-born American biochemist. A longtime professor of comparative biosciences at the University of Illinois at Urbana–Champaign, Kummerow was best known as an opponent of the use of artificial trans fats in processed foods, carrying out a 50-year campaign for a federal ban on the use of the substance in processed foods. He was one of the pioneers in establishing the connection between trans fats and heart disease, and he helped to cement the inclusion of trans fats into the Nurses' Health Study. He also helped discover that it is oxidized cholesterol (oxysterol), rather than the cholesterol, that causes heart disease.

== Early life and education ==
Kummerow was born in Berlin on October 4, 1914; his father was a laborer. At the age of eight, he moved with his family to the United States, arriving at Ellis Island on Memorial Day 1923.

The family settled in Milwaukee. An interest in science was sparked by a gift of a chemistry set on his twelfth birthday. Kummerow was graduated from the University of Wisconsin at Madison in 1939, with a degree in chemistry; he received a Ph.D. in biochemistry from the same university in 1943.

== Career ==
Kummerow researched lipids at Kansas State University during and after World War II. He won a contract from the U.S. Army Quartermaster Corps to investigate methods of preventing frozen turkeys and chickens from tasting rancid. Ultimately, "a simple change in the poultry feed solved the problem, making possible the sale of frozen poultry in grocery stores." The feed change was from linseed to corn.

During his early career, Kummerow participated in developing a cure for pellagra through enrichment of grits with niacin. Pellagra was a chronic disease affecting millions with inadequate diets, mostly in the southern U.S., and having a death toll of 100,000 between 1900 and 1940.

In 1950, Kummerow joined the staff of the University of Illinois, where he remained throughout the rest of his life. His research, funded by National Institutes of Health grants, focused on heart disease, until shortly before his death. His research led to the discovery of the link between trans fats and cardiac disease. As a researcher during the Cold War, Kummerow traveled widely in Soviet bloc countries to speak with scientists, reporting back to the State Department on what he had learned. He turned his attention to Parkinson's and Alzheimer's in 2013.

Kummerow authored at least 460 journal articles over the course of his career. He published the first paper suggesting a connection between trans fats and heart disease in 1957. The article, which appeared in Science, was not met with widespread acceptance initially and even received scornful disdain from some associated with the food industry. It took decades before the link between trans fat consumption and heart disease was fully accepted. Kummerow's work, however, helped to cement the inclusion of trans fats into the Nurses' Health Study. The results of that study further confirmed the link. He also helped discover that it is oxidized cholesterol (oxysterols), rather than the cholesterol, that causes heart disease.

Kummerow urged food companies to lower the amount of trans fat in foods laden with the substance, such as shortening and margarine, and the multitude of products containing them. As further studies confirmed the trans fat-heart disease link, the Center for Science in the Public Interest filed 1994 petition with FDA to require that the trans-fats substance be listed on nutrition facts labels (the petition was ultimately granted 12 years later), and the American Heart Association began to warn about the health risks of trans fats in 2004. Food companies also began voluntarily to remove trans fats from their products amid growing scientific and consumer pressure.

In 2009, at the age of 94, Kummerow filed a petition with the U.S. Food and Drug Administration (FDA) for a federal ban on artificial trans fats. The FDA did not act on his petition for four years, and in 2013 Kummerow filed a lawsuit against the FDA and the U.S. Department of Health and Human Services, seeking to compel the FDA to respond to his petition and, "to ban partially hydrogenated oils unless a complete administrative review finds new evidence for their safety." Kummerow 's petition stated that "Artificial trans fat is a poisonous and deleterious substance, and the FDA has acknowledged the danger."

Three months after the suit was filed, on June 16, 2015, the FDA moved to eliminate artificial trans fats from the U.S. food supply, giving manufacturers a deadline of three years. The FDA specifically ruled that trans fat was not generally recognized as safe and "could no longer be added to food after June 18, 2018, unless a manufacturer could present convincing scientific evidence that a particular use was safe." Kummerow stated: "Science won out." The ban is believed to enable the prevention of approximately 90,000 premature deaths annually.

== Later years ==
Kummerow formally retired at the age of 78, taking the title of emeritus professor of comparative biosciences. He continued to conduct research, even as a centenarian. Around his one hundredth birthday, Kummerow switched his focus to Parkinson's and Alzheimer's research, rather than heart disease, saying that he "felt that he was through with heart disease." He also said that he wanted to research Parkinson's disease, the cause of his wife's death two years earlier, and Alzheimer's disease, the cause of his sister-in-law's death. Kummerow maintained his lab at the University of Illinois until the year before his death.

In addition to his scientific and science advocacy work, Kummerow was involved in citizen advocacy more broadly; his papers include copies of "letters to five U.S. presidents, members of Congress and other people of distinction on topics such as the national debt, the Vietnam War, nuclear weapons, and energy."

== Death ==
Kummerow died on May 31, 2017, at his home in Urbana, Illinois, at the age of 102. He had been married for 70 years to his wife, Amy, who predeceased him. She died in July 2012. Kummerow is survived by a son and two daughters.

== Selected publications ==
- Johnston PV, Johnson OC, Kummerow FA. Occurrence of trans fatty acids in human tissue. Science 126, 698–699 (1957).
- Kummerow FA. Nutrition imbalance and angiotoxins as dietary risk factors in coronary heart disease. Am. J. Clin. Nutr. 32, 58–83 (1979).
- Kummerow FA. Interaction between sphingomyelin and oxysterols contributes to atherosclerosis and sudden death. Am. J. Cardiovasc. Dis. 3(1), 17–26 (2013).

== See also ==
- List of centenarians (medical professionals)
- Refined grains
- Enriched flour
