= Howard Tucker =

American neurologist (1922–2025)

- Born: July 10, 1922; Cleveland, Ohio, U.S.
- Died: December 22, 2025 (aged 103); Cleveland, Ohio, U.S.
- Education: Ohio State University College of Medicine
- Known for: Oldest practicing doctor
- Spouse: Sara Siegel (m. 1957)
- Children: 4
- Medical career
- Profession: Neurologist
- Institutions: St. Vincent Charity Medical Center

Howard Tucker (July 10, 1922 – December 22, 2025) was an American neurologist who practiced medicine from 1947 to 2022. In 1989, at age 67, Tucker additionally became a lawyer after passing the Ohio bar examination. He was also later recognized by Guinness World Records as the world's oldest practicing doctor.

== Early life and education ==
Howard Tucker was born in Cleveland, Ohio, on July 10, 1922. He decided to pursue a career in medicine while attending Cleveland Heights High School. After graduating high school in 1940, Tucker attended Ohio State University for his undergraduate studies and the Ohio State University College of Medicine for his Doctor of Medicine degree.

Tucker enlisted in the United States Navy during World War II and would later serve as Chief of Neurology for the Atlantic Fleet during the Korean War.

== Medical career ==
Tucker completed his residency at the Cleveland Clinic and training at the Neurological Institute of New York before returning to Cleveland, where he would practice neurology at University Hospitals Cleveland Medical Center and Hillcrest Hospital for over seven decades. While still practicing neurology, Tucker attended Cleveland State University Cleveland–Marshall College of Law where he received his Juris Doctor degree and passed the Ohio Bar Examination at age 67 in 1989.

In 1960, Tucker was credited with solving a medical case involving two young girls who would go in and out of coma. Tucker determined the cause of the comas to be barbiturate poisoning.

Tucker taught medical residents at St. Vincent Charity Medical Center and pursued work as an expert witness for various medical-legal cases. In 2021, Tucker was recognized as the world's oldest practicing doctor by Guinness World Records.

== Personal life and death ==
In 1957, Tucker married Sara "Sue" Siegel. As of 2023, 89-year-old Siegel continued to practice medicine as a psychoanalyst. The couple had four children and 10 grandchildren.

A feature documentary on Tucker's life and career, What's Next?, is currently in production and is being produced by Tucker's grandson, Austin Tucker, and directed and produced by Taylor Taglianetti.

In April 2023, he contributed a piece to CNBC on five important pieces of life advice: staying active and not spending his days retired, staying in shape, not smoking, not restricting himself to a narrow number of activities, and not letting the vast knowledge and changes he's seen be wasted.

His brother Leonard turned 100 in 2025.

Tucker died on December 22, 2025 at the age of 103.
