= Yeshiva Derech Hatorah (Cleveland) =

Location
- 1508 Warrensville Center Road; Cleveland Heights, (Cuyahoga County), Ohio 44121; United States
- 41°31′8″N 81°32′14″W

Information
- Type: Private, Coeducational
- Religious affiliation: Jewish
- Principal: Rabbi Stein
- Head of school: Yitzchak Margareten
- Grades: Preschool–12th
- Enrollment: 750 (2019-2020)
- Website: www.ytdcleveland.org

Yeshiva Derech Hatorah School is a private, Jewish school in Cleveland Heights, Ohio. The school was formerly named Mosdos Ohr HaTorah until 2015 when it was reorganized under the Yeshiva Derech Hatorah organization.

== History ==
The girls school was opened in 1993.

Facing a debt of about $26 million, Mosdos Ohr HaTorah applied for a judicial dissolution of its two corporations in Cuyahoga County Common Pleas Court in July 2015. In December 2015, Yeshiva Derech HaTorah, a Cleveland-based non profit organization acquired the school and its properties, and renamed the school.
