= Ruffing Montessori =

Private middle school in Ohio, US

Ruffing Montessori School

Location
- 3380 Fairmount Boulevard; Cleveland Heights, Ohio 44118; United States
- Coordinates: 41°29′10″N 81°33′35″W

Information
- Type: Montessori, 18 months through 8th grade
- Motto: Reduce Reuse Recycle
- Established: 1959
- Founder: Maria Montessori
- Head of school: Kathie Freer
- Grades: Toddler-8th grade
- Enrollment: 308
- Average class size: 28 Students
- Student to teacher ratio: 1:14
- Colours: Green and White
- Song: Light a Candle for Peace
- Athletics: Basketball, Volleyball, Soccer, Cross Country, Archery, Ultimate Frisbee
- Sports: Basketball, Volleyball, Soccer, Cross Country, Archery, Ultimate Frisbee
- Nickname: Ruffing
- Team name: Ruffing
- Accreditation: Independent Schools of the Central States; Ohio Department of Education
- Newspaper: Ruffing Weekly
- Yearbook: yes
- Website: Ruffing Montessori School

Ruffing Montessori School, the second oldest Montessori school established in the United States, was begun in 1959 through the efforts of the Cleveland Montessori Association. The organization founded and operated Montessori preschool and elementary classes in rented locations throughout Cleveland.

In 1964, a donation of a classroom building and property on Fairmount Boulevard in Cleveland Heights enabled the east side school to have a permanent location. In 1977, the east and west side schools separated, each retaining the name Ruffing in honor of Mary and Jim Ruffing, who led the Cleveland Montessori Association in its efforts to introduce Montessori to Northeast Ohio. With a current enrollment of 326, Ruffing in Cleveland Heights operates from a large, new facility, built according to LEED principles.
