= Mt. Echo Park =

Urban park in Price Hill, Cincinnati, Ohio, U.S.

Coordinates: 39°05′39″N 84°33′59″W

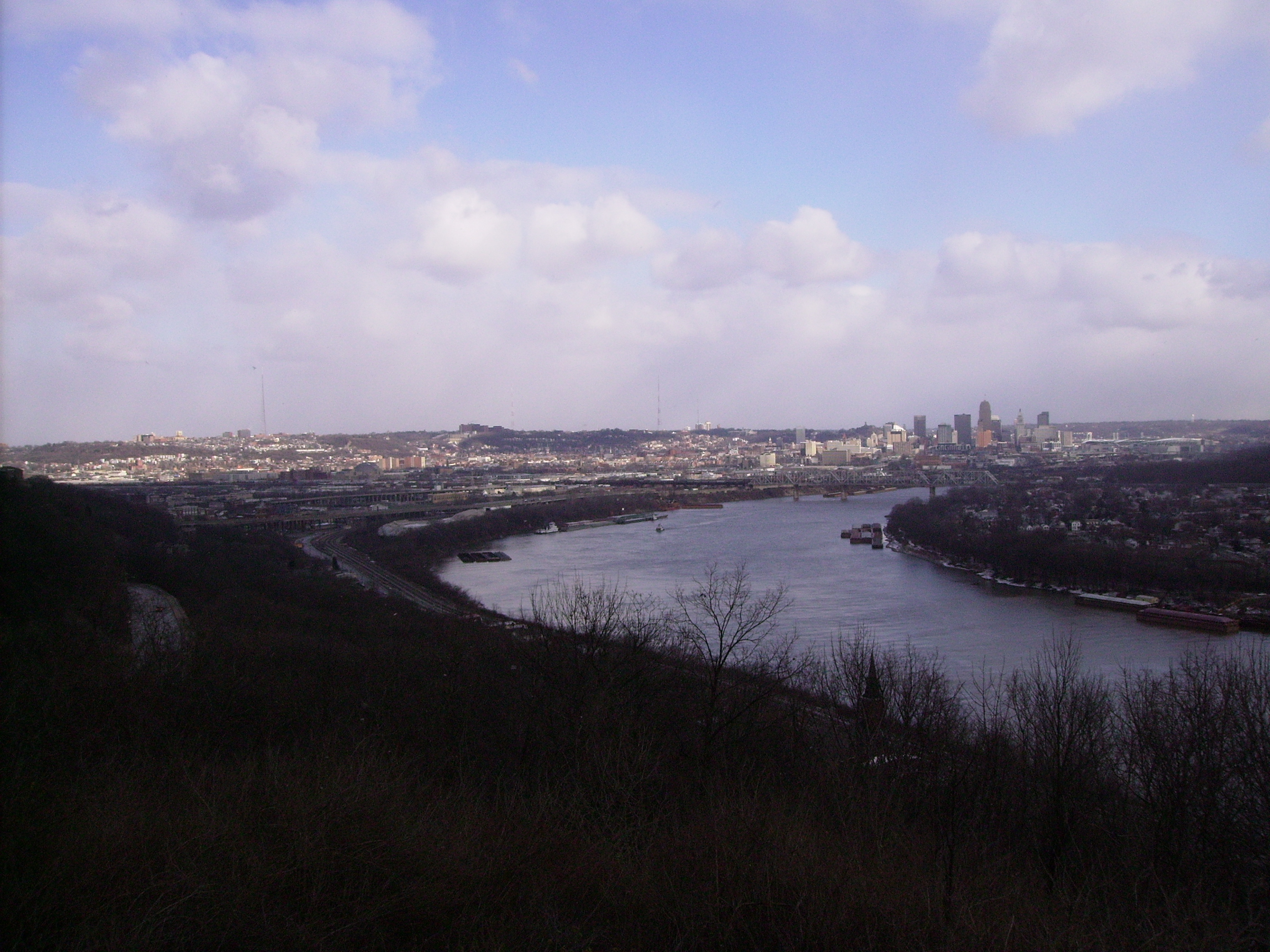
City view from a Mt. Echo Park overlook

Mt. Echo Park is an 84-acre (34 ha) urban park in the Price Hill neighborhood of Cincinnati, Ohio, United States. Located on a hilltop, the park offers scenic overlooks of Downtown Cincinnati, the Ohio River, and Northern Kentucky.

Mt. Echo Park opened in 1908 on land that was previously a dairy farm. An Italian Renaissance-style pavilion was added in 1928. Amenities include hiking trails and a playground.

== Architecture and Landscape ==
The two most prominent buildings in the park are the Mt. Echo Pavilion and the Mt. Echo Picnic Shelter.

The Mt. Echo Pavilion was designed and built by the Cincinnati architectural firm Rendigs, Panzer and Martin in 1928 as part of a city-wide planning initiative by the Cincinnati Park Board and George Kessler. The pavilion’s surroundings were designed by landscape architect A.D. Taylor. The scenic view and Italian Renaissance Revivalist architecture make the Pavilion a popular local wedding venue.

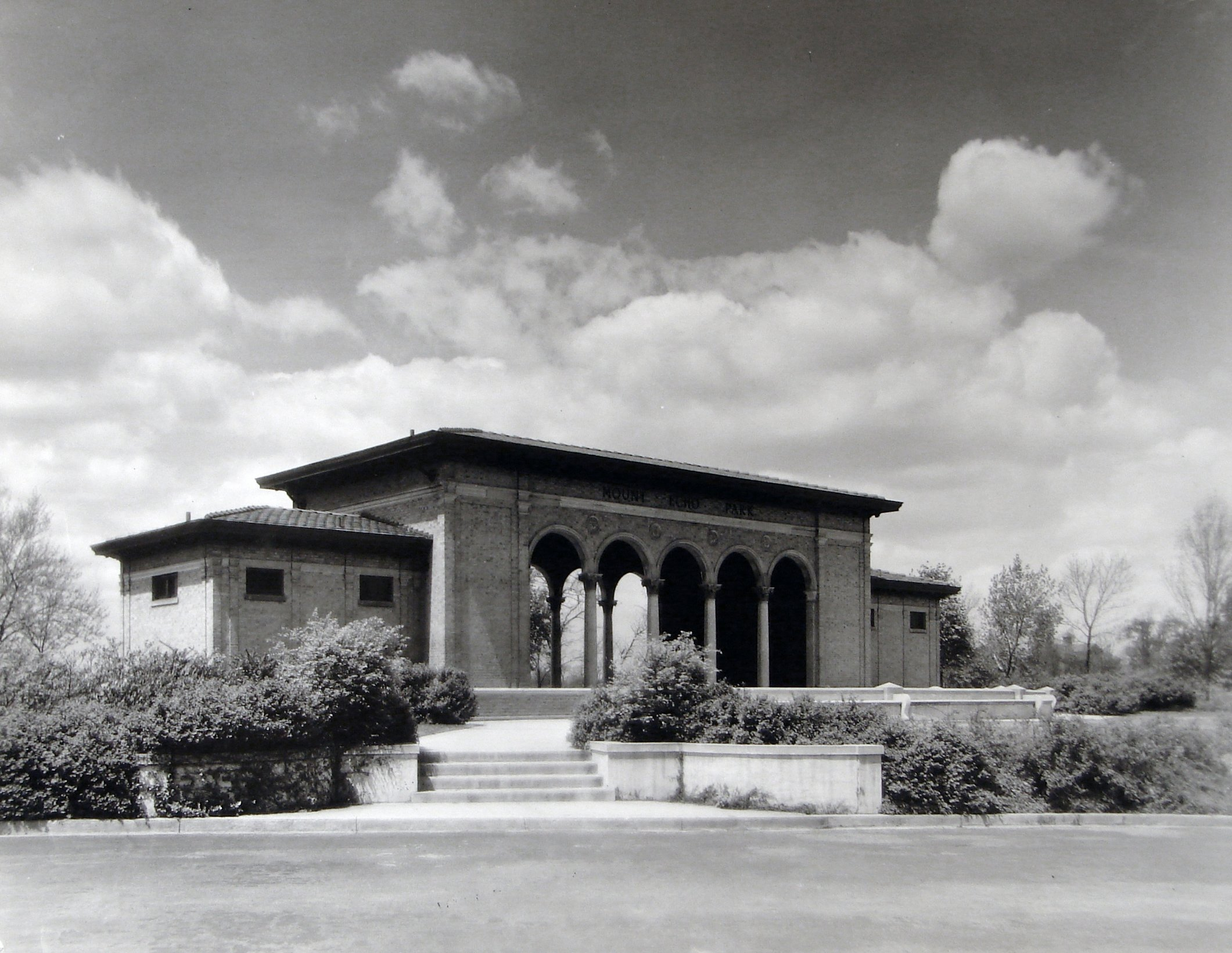
Mt. Echo Pavilion

The Mt. Echo Picnic Shelter was a New Deal-era addition erected in 1940. Built under the Works Progress Administration and designed by R. Carl Freund, the shelter has design features influenced by Frank Lloyd Wright, the organic architectural style, and the WPA "rustic" style.

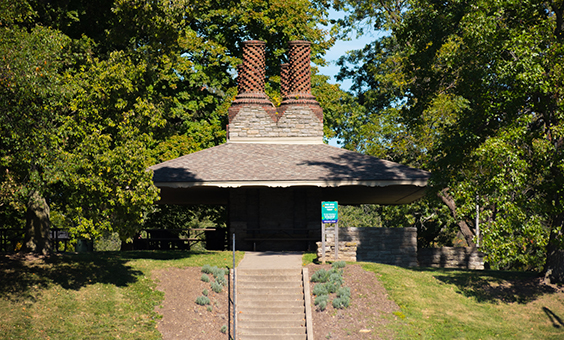
Mt. Echo Picnic Shelter
