= Erich Häßler =

Erich Häßler (April 22, 1899 – December 2, 2005) was a German pediatrician and academic from Leipzig, Saxony. He was also one of the last surviving veterans of the First World War living in Germany.

In 2004, Häßler was one of 22 members of the medical profession to sign a declaration of solidarity for Dr Rosemarie Albrecht, a German doctor accused of having conducted medical experiments in the Nazi era. Häßler was a member of the "Sängerschaft zu St Pauli" in Jena, a student fraternity. He died at the age of 106.
