= Can I Have 5 Minutes of Your Time? =

2009 book by Hal Becker

Can I Have 5 Minutes Of Your Time?
- Author: Hal Becker
- Language: English
- Genre: Non-fiction
- Publication date: May 1, 2008
- Publication place: United States
- Media type: Print (hardcover)
- ISBN: 978-0-9619590-7-4

Can I Have 5 Minutes Of Your Time? is a 2009 non fiction by American author Hal Becker. It explores sales from Xerox's former #1 salesperson in the US. Business Week describes it as "a fast read because Becker knows what he is talking about”, and All Business calls the book "a great training manual for anyone involved in sales".

It was first published by Oakhill in 1993 and then rewritten and refreshed for Morgan James in 2009. As of 2011 the book is in its 21st printing and has sold in excess of 125,000 copies.

Can I Have 5 Minutes of Your Time? took Becker over three years to complete and was rejected by 35 publishers. It was originally published by Oakhill and is now with Morgan James Publishers.

The book has been profiled in publications including The Plain Dealer, The Business Times, Akron Beacon Journal, Business Journals, and Business Week.
