= Cleveland Heights High School =

Public high school in Cleveland Heights, Ohio, United States

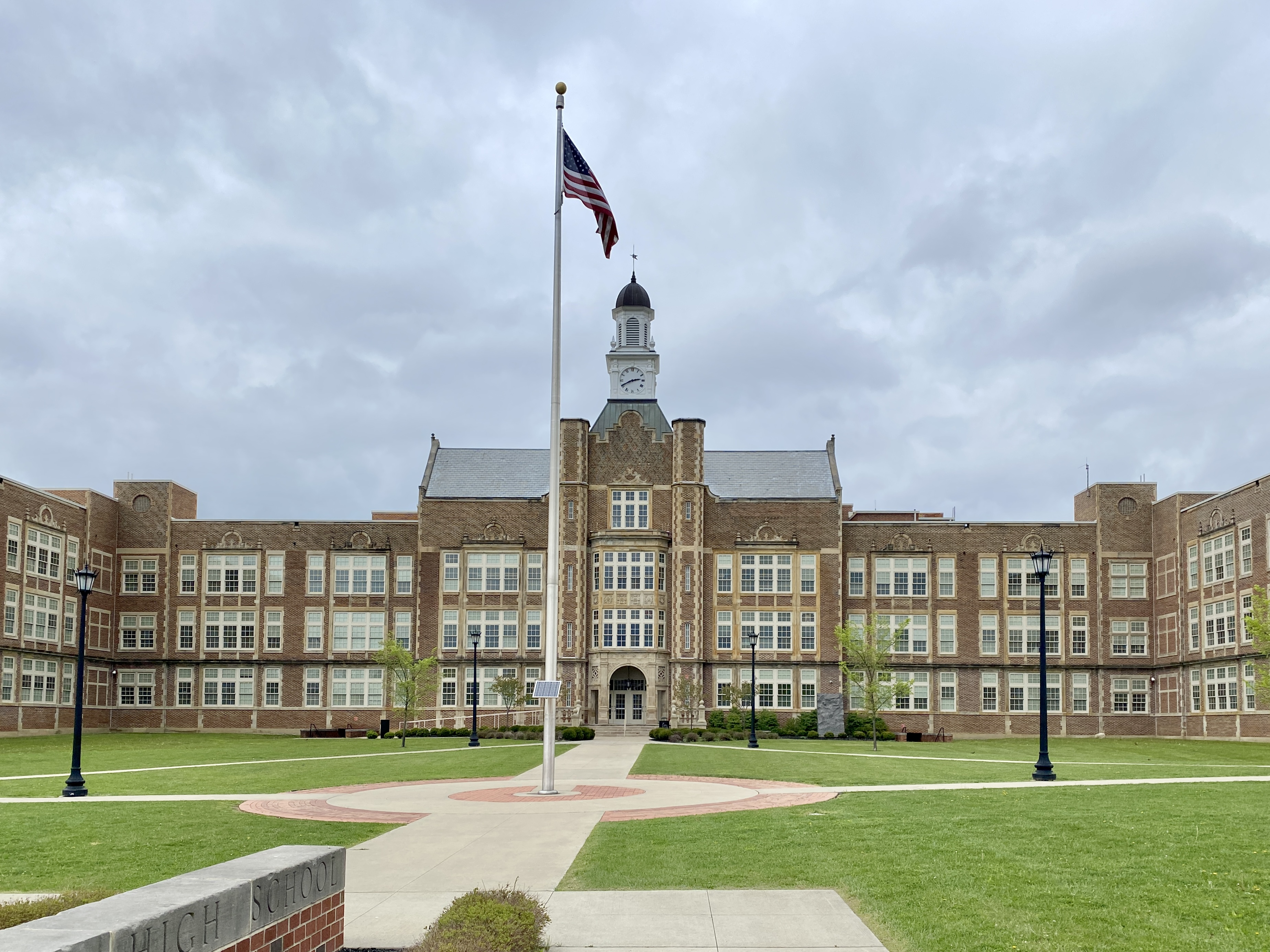

Location
- 13263 Cedar Road; Cleveland Heights, Cuyahoga County, Ohio 44118; United States; 41°30′8″N 81°33′47″W

Information
- Type: Public, coeducational high school
- Established: 1901
- School district: Cleveland Heights-University Heights City School District
- Superintendent: Elizabeth Kirby
- Principal: Brandon Towns
- Teaching staff: 107.00 (FTE)
- Grades: 9–12
- Enrollment: 1,636 (2023-2024)
- Student to teacher ratio: 15.29
- Colors: Black and gold
- Slogan: "Let's Go Tigers! Eat 'Em Up, Eat 'Em Up!"
- Athletics conference: Greater Cleveland Conference
- Nickname: The Tigers
- Team name: Tigers
- Website: heightshigh.chuh.org

Cleveland Heights High School is the senior high school of the Cleveland Heights-University Heights City School District, located in Cleveland Heights, Ohio, United States.

== History ==
Cleveland Heights High School was established in 1901 by the Cleveland Heights Board of Education. The student population was 1,772 as of the 2018–2019, school year with 15.02 student/teacher ratio. The student body is mostly African-American, with 75% identifying themselves as such, and Caucasian (15%), multiracial (6%), Hispanic (3%), and Asian (2%) minorities.

Heights athletic teams play in Division I. After 94 years in the Lake Erie League as one of the conference's founding members, Heights began competing in the Greater Cleveland Conference starting with the 2023–2024 school year.

The school is known for its strong music departments, including the Vocal Music Department (VMD) which includes A Cappella, Men's and Women's Barbershop, Singers, and Men and Women's choruses. The Heights Gospel Choir was founded in 1974, and remains active as an extracurricular ensemble. The Instrumental Music Department (IMD) consists of the Heights High Symphony, Symphonic Winds, Symphonic Band, Philharmonic Strings, Concert Band, Concert Orchestra, Marching Band, Jazz Lab, and Jazz Band. During the 1960 and 1970s, Heights High's music programs were nationally recognized, with the Choir and Orchestra considered among the best in the country. For a number of years, world-renowned musicians performed with the Orchestra, and many famous musicians have graduated from Heights, for example Alisa Weilerstein. The Heights Band & Orchestra Parents Organization (BOPO) and Heights Choir Parents Organization played a major role in promoting music and making Heights High synonymous with the highest quality music. The Heights High Symphony, Symphonic Winds and Jazz Ensemble competed in the 2007 Heritage Festival in Chicago, Illinois, culminating with an award ceremony at Medieval Times where the Symphony Orchestra, as well as the Jazz Ensemble, received Gold (or Superior) ratings.

The life stories of 48 graduates of Cleveland Heights High School are featured in the book Every Tiger Has a Tale, written by Gary Stromberg, a 1968 graduate of the school.

In 1991, the school won the 23rd National High School chess tournament. The team consisted of Andy Gard, Joshua Jex, Ari Singer and Wenning Xing. Xing also tied for the second place individual spot with a score of 6.0 out of seven, and Waitzkin (of Searching for Bobby Fischer fame) took first place with 6.5 out of seven.

The building that is currently being used opened in 1926. It was designed by architects Franz Childs Warner and W.R. McCormack in the Jacobethan style. The sandstone used in the construction of the building was sourced from quarries in Amherst, Ohio. In the summer of 2015, the building began going under major renovations. The building re-opened on August 21, 2017, and the students used the original building for the 2017-2018 school year. The students used the Wiley campus for the 2015-2016 and 2016-2017 school years.

== Ohio High School Athletic Association state championships ==
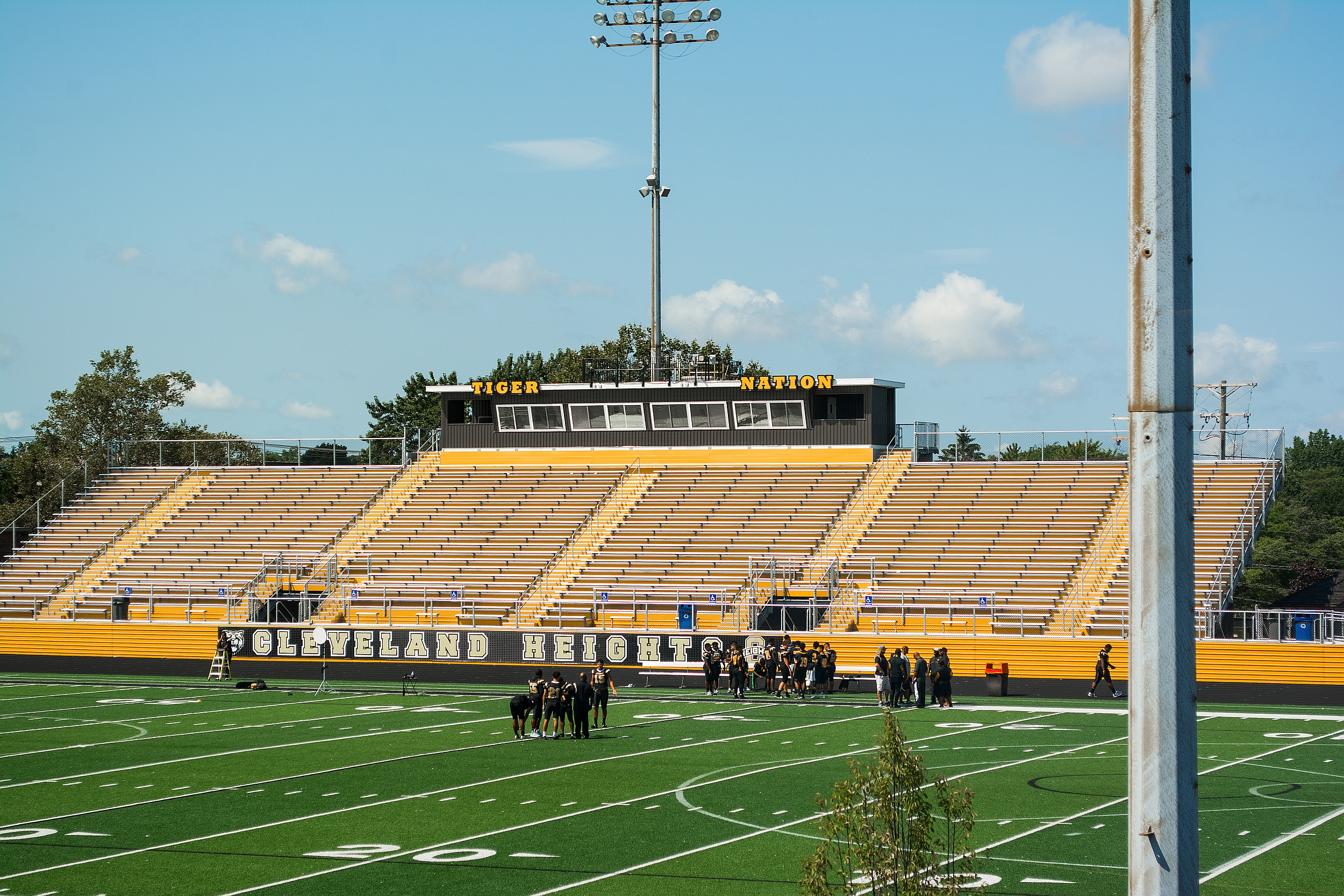
Cleveland Heights Football stadium, 2017

- Baseball — 1947
- Basketball (men's) — 1997
- Ice Hockey — 1987
- Boys' Track — 1941, 1982, 2008
- Wrestling — 1976
- Boys' Swimming - 1932, 1933, 1934, 1965
- Girls' Track - 1990, 1991, 1992, 1995

== Notable alumni ==
- Gina Abercrombie-Winstanley (1976), former U.S. Ambassador to Republic of Malta
- Hal Becker (1972), writer
- Jean Berko Gleason (1949), psycholinguist
- Barry Cofield, former NFL player
- Chuck Cooper, Tony Award-winning actor
- Eric Fingerhut, President and CEO of Jewish Federations of North America, former CEO of Hillel International, former U.S. Congressman from northeast Ohio, former Ohio State Senator
- Jimmy Fox (1965), James Gang founding drummer and organist
- Shelton Gibson (2013), former NFL player
- Darrell Issa, U.S. Congressman representing the San Diego, CA area
- Rajiv Joseph, playwright
- Jason Kelce (2006), former NFL player for the Philadelphia Eagles
- Travis Kelce (2008), NFL player for the Kansas City Chiefs
- Steve LaTourette (1972), former U.S. Congressman from northeast Ohio
- Clea Lewis (1983), actor
- Tom Mack (1962), Pro Football Hall of Fame player for Los Angeles Rams
- Mike McGruder (1980), NFL player for New England Patriots
- David Thomas (1971), one of the founding members of the seminal Cleveland art-rock band Pere Ubu
- Howard Tucker (1940), recognized as the oldest practicing doctor by Guinness World Records
- Mel Tucker (1990), college football coach
- Jae'Lyn Withers (2020), college basketball player
- Bert Wolstein (1945), real estate developer, sports team owner, and philanthropist
- Sean Young (attended), American Actress
