= Cleveland Heights–University Heights City School District =

School district in Ohio, United States

Coordinates: 41°30′30″N 81°33′48″W

The Cleveland Heights–University Heights City School District is a public school district based in University Heights, Ohio, United States.

The district enrolled 4,655 students as of October 21, 2026, and covers most of Cleveland Heights, all of University Heights, and a small portion of South Euclid.

== Schools ==
There are a total of ten schools in the Cleveland Heights–University Heights City School District – seven elementary, two middle, one high school, an early childhood learning center, and a school for students with emotional needs.

Nine schools are located within the city limits of Cleveland Heights, while Gearity Professional Development School is located in University Heights. The Coventry Elementary School and Wiley Middle School buildings are no longer used as active school buildings. Roosevelt Junior High School has been demolished.

=== High school ===
- Grades 9–12
  - Cleveland Heights High School (Cleveland Heights)

=== Middle schools ===
- Grades 6–8
  - Baumgardner Middle School (Cleveland Heights); closed for renovations in 2017 and reopened for the 2019–2020 school year. Originally named Monticello Middle School; renamed in 2025.
  - Roxboro Middle School (Cleveland Heights); closed for renovations in 2017 and reopened for the 2019–2020 school year.

=== Elementary schools ===
- Grades K–5
  - Boulevard Elementary School (Cleveland Heights)
  - Canterbury Elementary School (Cleveland Heights)
  - Fairfax Elementary School (Cleveland Heights)
  - Gearity Professional Development School (University Heights)
  - Noble Elementary School (Cleveland Heights)
  - Oxford Elementary School (Cleveland Heights)
  - Roxboro Elementary School (Cleveland Heights)

=== Other campuses ===
- Grades 6–12
  - Bellefaire School (University Heights)
- Preschool
  - Early Childhood Center (University Heights)

== See also ==
- List of school districts in Ohio
