= Cleveland Heights, Ohio =

- City
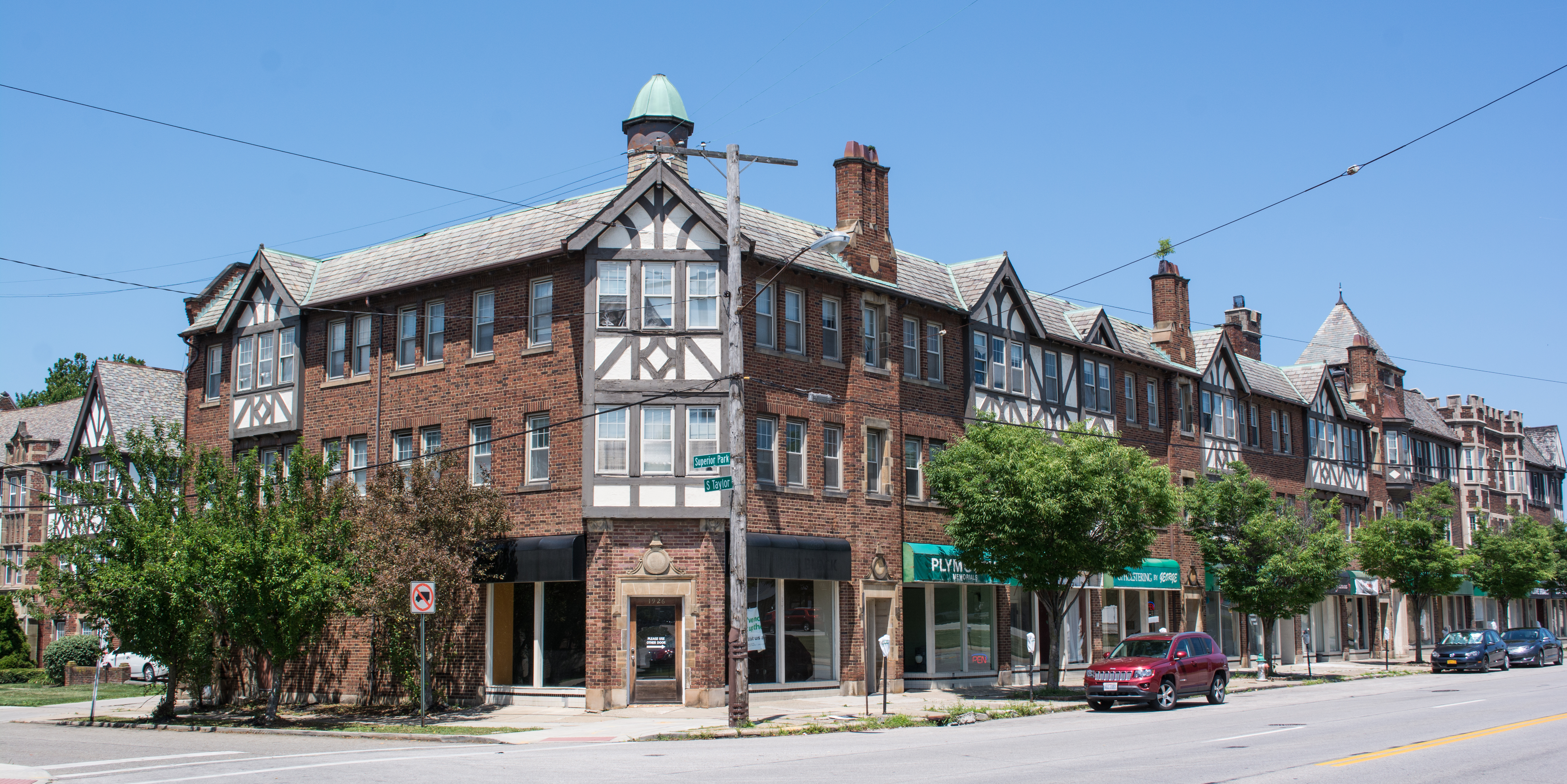
- Stadium Square Historic District

- Flag Logo
- Interactive map of Cleveland Heights, Ohio
- Location within Ohio Location within the United States
- Coordinates: 41°30′35″N 81°33′48″W
- Country: United States
- State: Ohio
- County: Cuyahoga
- Incorporated: 1901 (hamlet); 1903 (village); August 9, 1921 (city)

Government
  - Type: Mayor–council
  - Mayor: Jim Petras (D)

Area
  - Total: 8.08 sq mi (20.94 km^{2})
  - Land: 8.07 sq mi (20.89 km^{2})
  - Water: 0.019 sq mi (0.05 km^{2})
- Elevation: 942 ft (287 m)

Population (2020)
  - Total: 45,312
  - Estimate (2023): 43,908
  - Density: 5,618.1/sq mi (2,169.15/km^{2})
- Time zone: UTC-5 (Eastern (EST))
  - Summer (DST): UTC-4 (EDT)
- ZIP Codes: 44106, 44112, 44118, 44121
- Area code: 216
- FIPS code: 39-16014
- GNIS feature ID: 1048605
- Website: www.clevelandheights.gov

Cleveland Heights is a city in Cuyahoga County, Ohio, United States. The population was 45,312 at the 2020 census. Founded in 1901, it is one of Cleveland's historic streetcar suburbs.

== History ==
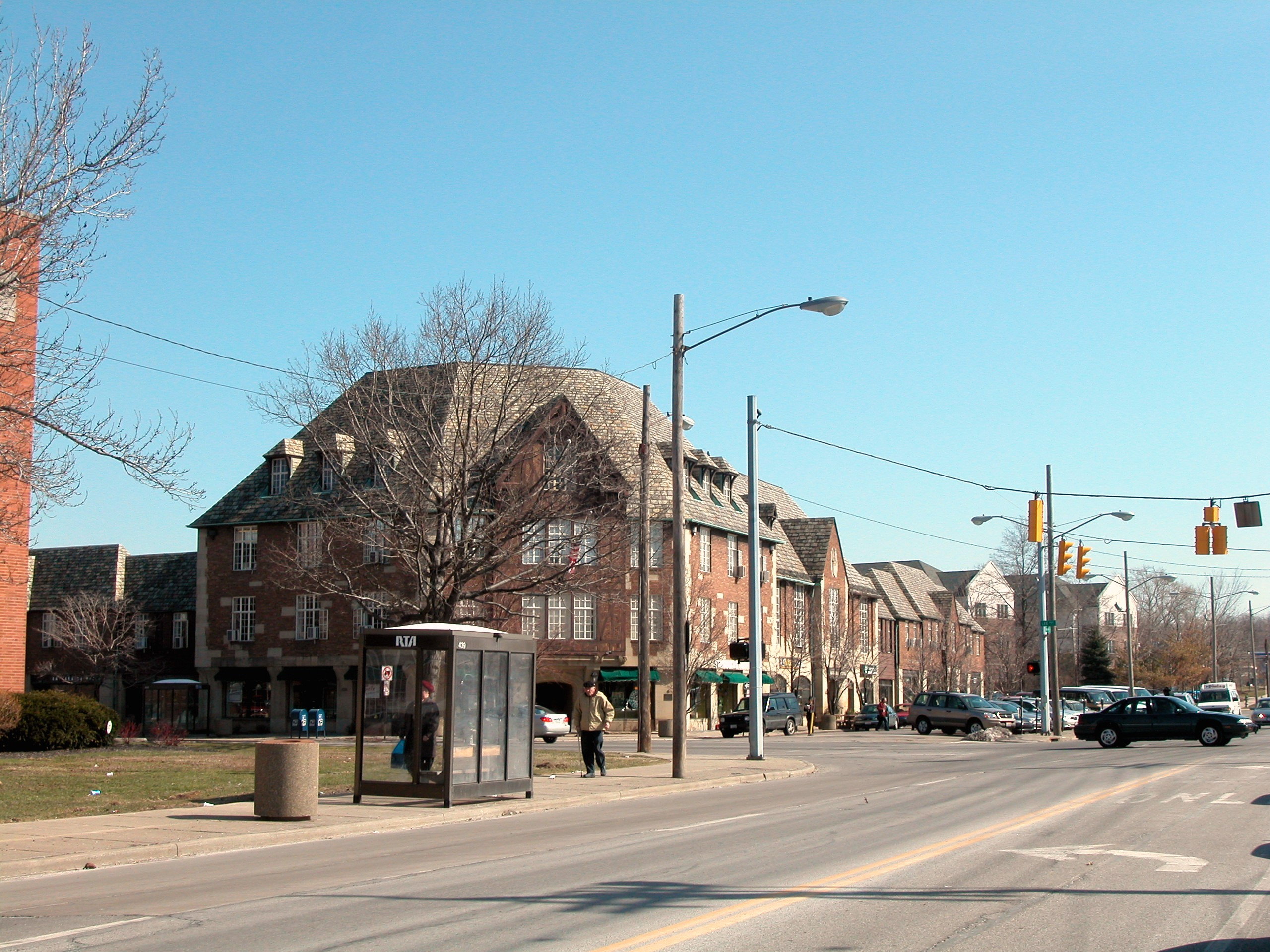
View of the Heights Rockefeller Building, from Mayfield and Lee Roads

The area that is now the city of Cleveland Heights lies atop the Portage Escarpment. Until the late 1800s, the area remained largely timber and farmland, with a few orchards, quarries, and vineyards. The first road through the city, Mayfield Road, was not built until 1828. The initial road took 2 years to build. Some of the land was divided into farms, but it also had quarries in the 19th century. One of the early quarries was established by Duncan McFarland who mined bluestone. This led to the settlement that grew up around the quarry for the workers to live in to be referred to as Bluestone. There is still a road of this name in that area.

In 1873, business magnate John D. Rockefeller acquired about 700 acres (280 ha) in what is now the cities of East Cleveland and Cleveland Heights, with a water cure hotel, which he converted to a mansion for his family in East Cleveland. Eventually, some of the land, straddling both suburbs, was turned into residential developments, and, in 1938, the family donated land which is now Forest Hill Park.

The development of electric streetcars made the development of suburbs far outside Cleveland's city limits practical for the first time in the 1890s. About 1890, a town center began forming at what is now the intersection of Mayfield and Superior roads. Cleveland Heights was first organized as a hamlet in 1901. The population of about 1,500 grew quickly, and in 1903 it incorporated as a village. It had a population of 15,396 in 1920 and was incorporated as a city on August 9, 1921. Between 1920 and 1930, Cleveland Heights' population more than tripled. By 1960 it had a population of 61,813.

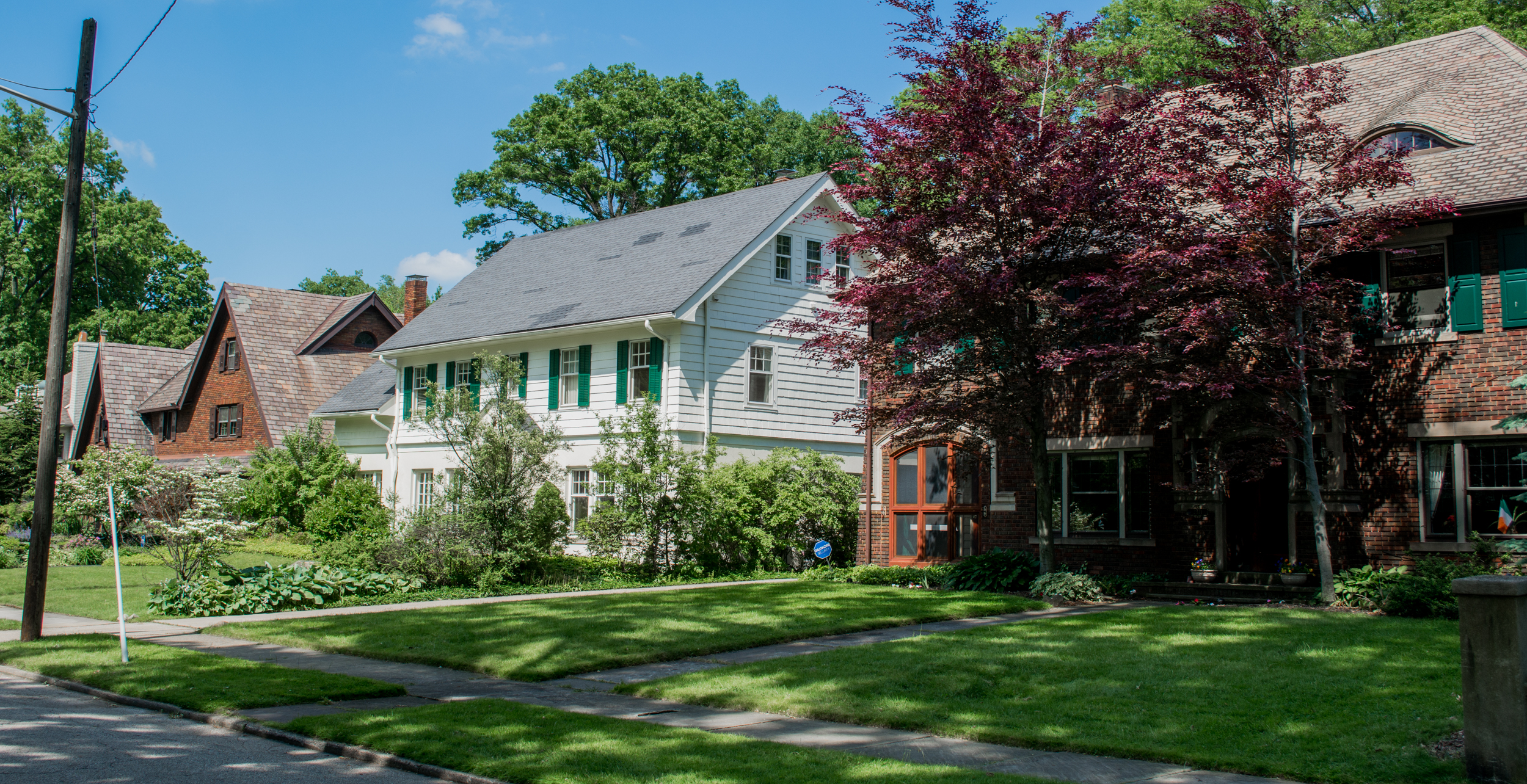
Woodmere Drive, Euclid Golf Allotment

In 1890, railroad baron Patrick Calhoun purchased 300 acres (1.2 km^{2}) atop nearby Cedar Hill, and in 1893 established the planned community of Euclid Heights. (Note: The development was named for Euclid Avenue and the high position the property sat on.) In 1913, Barton R. Deming convinced Rockefeller to enter into a purchase agreement for the 141 acres (0.57 km^{2}) formerly leased to the Euclid Golf Club of Euclid Heights, which resulting in the founding of the B.R. Deming Company to develop the Euclid Golf Allotment. The Euclid Golf Allotment was added to the National Register of Historic Places in 2002.

In November 1926, the establishment of a new business district on Taylor Road was announced. This resulted in numerous residential homes and mixed-use structures built in the Tudor Revival style that are now known as the Stadium Square Historic District.

In the 1950s, Cleveland Heights saw the influx of many merchant class and professional Jewish people leaving Cleveland, particularly the Hough and Glenville neighborhoods. In 1961, 35% of the Jewish population of Cuyahoga County lived in Cleveland Heights. Although the Black population of Cleveland Heights was less than 1% in 1960, partially due to restrictive covenants, Black Clevelanders began to move into Cleveland Heights in the 1960s and 1970s. This led to violence and pushback from some white citizens. However, organizations such as Heights Citizens For Human Rights and Heights Community Congress formed to protest violence against Black citizens, and promote integration in the city.

In 1987, the city of Cleveland Heights was declared a nuclear-free zone.

== Geography ==
Cleveland Heights is located at 41°30′35″N 81°33′48″W.

According to the United States Census Bureau, the city has a total area of 8.13 square miles (21.06 km^{2}), of which 8.11 square miles (21.00 km^{2}) is land and 0.02 square miles (0.05 km^{2}) is water. Cleveland Heights is made up of three watersheds, the Doan Brook Watershed, the Dugway Brook Watershed, and the Nine Mile Creek Watershed. Approximately 50% of Cleveland Heights is part of the Dugway Brook Watershed.

== Demographics ==
Historical population
Census	Pop.	Note	%±
1910	2,955		—
1920	15,236		415.6%
1930	50,945		234.4%
1940	54,992		7.9%
1950	59,141		7.5%
1960	61,813		4.5%
1970	60,767		−1.7%
1980	56,438		−7.1%
1990	54,052		−4.2%
2000	49,958		−7.6%
2010	46,121		−7.7%
2020	45,312		−1.8%
2025 (est.)	43,750		−3.4%

=== Racial and ethnic composition ===
Cleveland Heights city, Ohio – Racial and ethnic composition Note: the US Census treats Hispanic/Latino as an ethnic category. This table excludes Latinos from the racial categories and assigns them to a separate category. Hispanics/Latinos may be of any race.
Race / Ethnicity (NH = Non-Hispanic)	Pop 2000	Pop 2010	Pop 2020	% 2000	% 2010	% 2020
White alone (NH)	25,840	22,536	20,677	51.72%	48.86%	45.63%
Black or African American alone (NH)	20,752	19,448	18,534	41.54%	42.17%	40.90%
Native American or Alaska Native alone (NH)	70	61	55	0.14%	0.13%	0.12%
Asian alone (NH)	1,275	1,880	2,274	2.55%	4.08%	5.02%
Native Hawaiian or Pacific Islander alone (NH)	5	6	5	0.01%	0.01%	0.01%
Other race alone (NH)	179	120	357	0.36%	0.26%	0.79%
Mixed race or Multiracial (NH)	1,046	1,167	1,874	2.09%	2.53%	4.14%
Hispanic or Latino (any race)	791	903	1,536	1.58%	1.96%	3.39%
Total	49,958	46,121	45,312	100.00%	100.00%	100.00%

=== 2020 census ===
As of the 2020 census, Cleveland Heights had a population of 45,312. The median age was 36.2 years. 20.4% of residents were under the age of 18 and 18.5% of residents were 65 years of age or older. For every 100 females there were 87.9 males, and for every 100 females age 18 and over there were 84.2 males age 18 and over.

100.0% of residents lived in urban areas, while 0.0% lived in rural areas.

There were 20,053 households in Cleveland Heights, of which 22.5% had children under the age of 18 living in them. Of all households, 32.9% were married-couple households, 21.9% were households with a male householder and no spouse or partner present, and 38.1% were households with a female householder and no spouse or partner present. About 38.8% of all households were made up of individuals and 14.0% had someone living alone who was 65 years of age or older.

There were 22,270 housing units, of which 10.0% were vacant. The homeowner vacancy rate was 2.9% and the rental vacancy rate was 9.5%.

Racial composition as of the 2020 census
Race	Number	Percent
White	20,993	46.3%
Black or African American	18,713	41.3%
American Indian and Alaska Native	73	0.2%
Asian	2,288	5.0%
Native Hawaiian and Other Pacific Islander	7	0.0%
Some other race	639	1.4%
Two or more races	2,599	5.7%
Hispanic or Latino (of any race)	1,536	3.4%

The percent of those with a bachelor's degree or higher was estimated to be 41.7% of the population.

The 2016–2020 5-year American Community Survey estimates show that the median household income was $59,086 (with a margin of error of +/- $2,897) and the median family income was $77,877 (+/- $6,920). Males had a median income of $41,404 (+/- $2,587) versus $31,449 (+/- $1,383) for females. The median income for those above 16 years old was $35,111 (+/- $2,762). Approximately, 12.0% of families and 18.0% of the population were below the poverty line, including 25.4% of those under the age of 18 and 9.2% of those ages 65 or over.

=== 2010 census ===
As of the census of 2010, there were 46,238 people, 19,957 households, and 10,834 families residing in the city. The population density was 5,686.9 inhabitants per square mile (2,195.7/km^{2}). There were 22,465 housing units at an average density of 2,770.0 per square mile (1,069.5/km^{2}). The racial makeup of the city was 49.8% White, 42.5% African American, 0.2% Native American, 4.1% Asian, 0.6% from other races, and 2.8% from two or more races. Hispanic or Latino of any race were 2.0% of the population.

There were 19,957 households, of which 26.2% had children under the age of 18 living with them, 35.6% were married couples living together, 15.2% had a female householder with no husband present, 3.4% had a male householder with no wife present, and 45.7% were non-families. 36.1% of all households were made up of individuals, and 10.4% had someone living alone who was 65 years of age or older. The average household size was 2.27 and the average family size was 3.05.

The median age in the city was 35.8 years. 22.3% of residents were under the age of 18; 10.6% were between the ages of 18 and 24; 27.9% were from 25 to 44; 25.9% were from 45 to 64; and 13.5% were 65 years of age or older. The gender makeup of the city was 46.6% male and 53.4% female.

The median income for a household in the city was $53,024. The per capita income for the city was $31,663. About 19.3% of individuals were below the poverty line.

== Economy ==
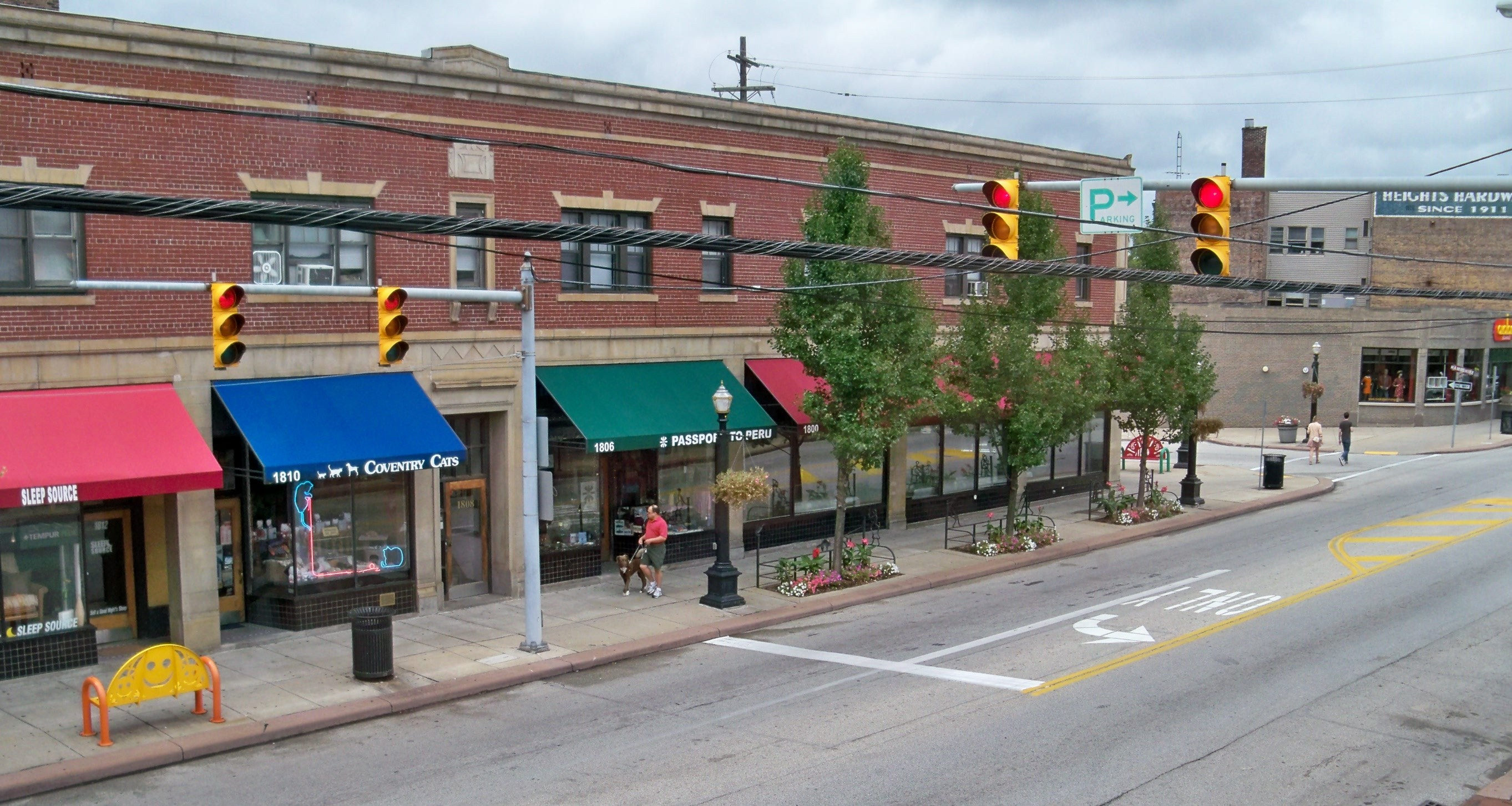
Coventry Village

Coventry Village is a commercial business district in Cleveland Heights situated on Coventry Road. Coventry is associated with Northeast Ohio's artistic, musical, bohemian, hippie and emerging hipster communities. The street has had significant business turnover since the 60s, but continues to be home to local businesses that have anchored the Cleveland Heights community for several decades, such as the independent bookstore Mac's Backs Books and the live music venue the Grog Shop.

== Parks and recreation ==
Cleveland Heights has seven city parks: Barbara H. Boyd Park, Cain Park, Cumberland Park, Denison Park, Forest Hill Park, Kenilworth Park and Turtle Park.

== Government ==
Cleveland Heights is governed by a city charter adopted in 1921 and amended in 1972, 1982, 1986, and 2019. Until 2019, the Cleveland Heights city charter specified a council–manager form of government. On November 5, 2019, voters approved a charter amendment to transition to a strong mayor–council form of government, with the mayor serving as the city's chief executive and a seven-member City Council holding legislative authority.

=== Recall of Kahlil Seren ===
The city's first strong mayor, Kahlil Seren, was removed from office on September 9, 2025, following a recall election in which 82% of voters voted in favor of his removal. The recall campaign was driven by allegations of financial mismanagement, including failure to submit timely audits, an incomplete 2025 budget, and a "hostile" and "unethical" work environment that led to high staff turnover.

Controversy during Seren's tenure also centered on the conduct of his wife, Natalie McDaniel. In March 2025, City Administrator Dan Horrigan resigned after less than three months, citing McDaniel's interference as contributing to an "untenable" environment. McDaniel was subsequently indicted on July 30, 2025, for trespassing into a resident's home. Following the certification of the recall results, Council President Tony Cuda was sworn in as interim mayor on October 1, 2025, serving until the special election could be certified.

=== Jim Petras Administration ===
In the subsequent normal election, former City Council member Jim Petras was elected as the city's second mayor. He was sworn in on January 5, 2026, marking a historic transition for the city. Petras is the first openly gay mayor in Cleveland Heights history and, at the time of his inauguration, was the only openly gay mayor serving in the state of Ohio. Upon taking office, Petras pledged to stabilize city services and restore trust in City Hall following the tumult of the previous year.

=== City Council ===
As of January 2026, the City Council is led by President Tony Cuda and Vice President Gail Larson. The body is composed of seven members elected at large. In the November 2025 election, voters elected newcomers Jessica Cohen and Joe DeWitt-Foy, while incumbent Anthony Mattox, Jr. was defeated. Former Vice President Davida Russell vacated her seat to run for mayor.

The current council consists of Tony Cuda, Gail Larson, Craig Cobb, Jim Posch, Jessica Cohen, Joe DeWitt-Foy, and Sarah Stone. The seventh seat, previously held by Jim Petras, was filled by council appointment.

=== Politics ===
Cleveland Heights is reliably Democratic. In recent presidential elections, the city has voted overwhelmingly for the Democratic candidate, with Joe Biden defeating Donald Trump 85.1% to 13.1% in 2020. In 2003, Cleveland Heights voters approved a referendum to establish Ohio's first domestic partnership registry.

At the federal level, Cleveland Heights is located in Ohio's 11th congressional district, which is represented by Congresswoman Shontel Brown. The district was formerly represented by Marcia Fudge prior to her appointment as U.S. Secretary of Housing and Urban Development.

== Education ==
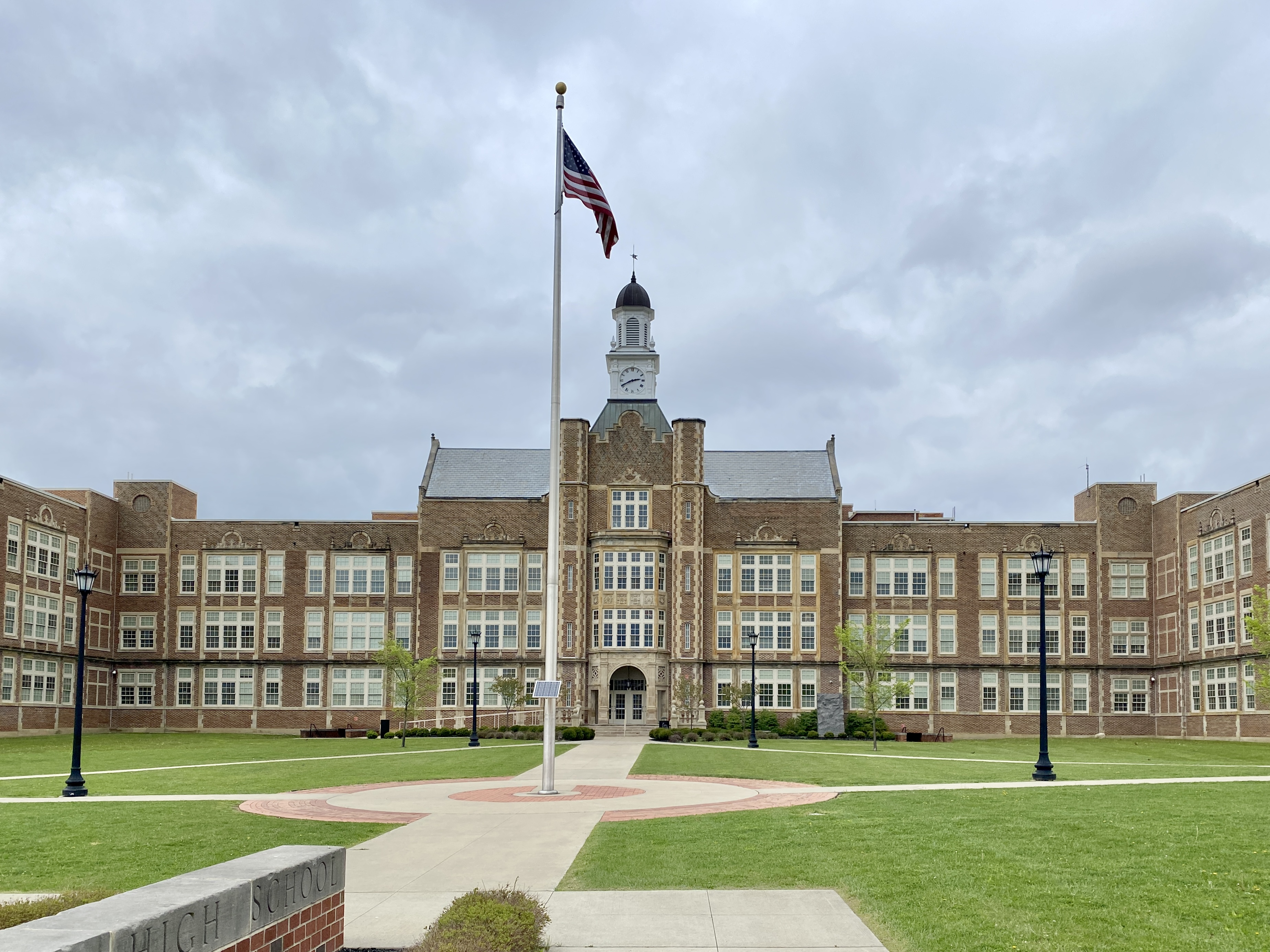
Cleveland Heights High School

Public education in the city of Cleveland Heights is provided by two school districts. Most of the city is served by the Cleveland Heights–University Heights City School District, which includes six elementary schools within city limits, as well as two middle schools and Cleveland Heights High School. A small portion located on the northwest side of the city lies within the East Cleveland City School District.

Several private schools are located within the city, including Beaumont School, Lutheran High School East, Horizon Montessori, Ruffing Montessori, Hebrew Academy of Cleveland, Communion of Saints School, Mosdos Ohr Hatorah, and Yeshiva of Cleveland.

== Transportation ==
The Greater Cleveland Regional Transit Authority provides bus service in the city.

== Notable people ==
- Gina Abercrombie-Winstanley, former U.S. Ambassador to Malta
- Hal Becker, writer
- Jean Berko Gleason, psycholinguist
- Hector Boiardi, businessman also known as Chef Boy-Ar-Dee (and its brand)
- Timothy Broglio, president of the United States Conference of Catholic Bishops and Archbishop for the Military Services, USA
- Martha Chase, geneticist who confirmed that DNA was the genetic material of life through the Hershey–Chase experiment
- Barry Cofield, NFL player
- Chuck Cooper, Tony Award-winning actor
- Christine De Vinne, president of Ursuline College
- Kevin Edwards, former NBA player
- Laila Edwards, American Olympic ice hockey player
- Eric Fingerhut, president and CEO of Jewish Federations of North America, former CEO of Hillel International, former U.S. Congressman from northeast Ohio, former Ohio State Senator
- Jimmy Fox, founding drummer and organist of James Gang
- Donald Glaser, Nobel prize-winning physicist
- Kathryn Hahn, actress
- Darrell Issa, U.S. Congressman
- Jason Kelce, former NFL player for the Philadelphia Eagles
- Travis Kelce, NFL player for the Kansas City Chiefs
- Steve LaTourette, former U.S. Congressman from northeast Ohio
- Clea Lewis, actress
- Mike McGruder, NFL player for New England Patriots
- Paul Newman, actor
- Maxwell Stern of Signals Midwest, musician
- Jack Stratton, musician, founder and leader of Vulfpeck
- Mel Tucker, former head football coach at Michigan State University
- Merton F. Utter, microbiologist and biochemist
- Bill Watterson, cartoonist and creator of Calvin and Hobbes
- Sean Young, actress
- Debra Winger, Academy Award-nominated actress

== See also ==
- Forest Hill, Ohio
