= Forest Hill, Ohio =

- Forest Hill Historic District
- U.S. National Register of Historic Places
- U.S. Historic district
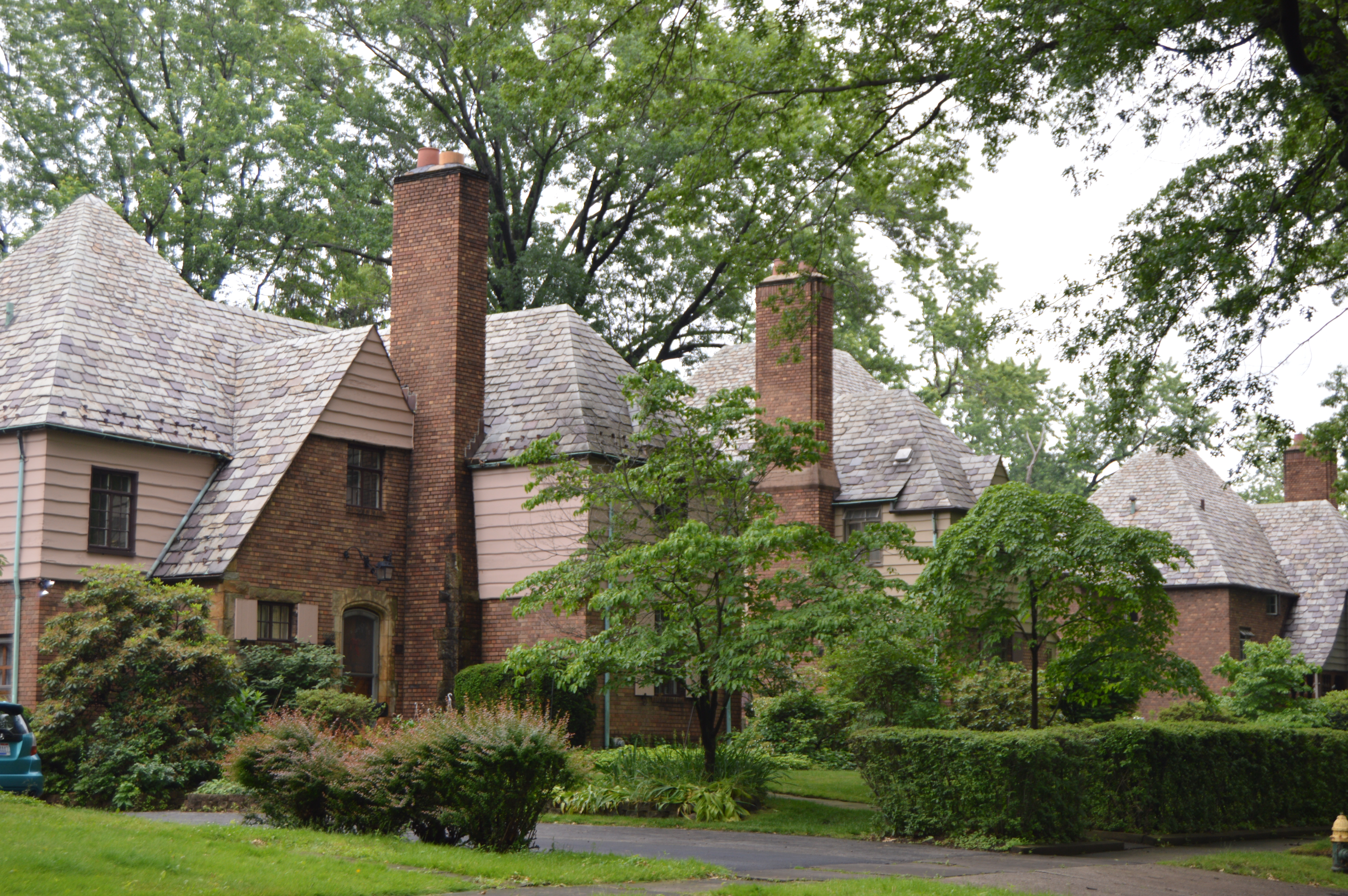
- Houses on Brewster Road

- Location within Ohio Location within the United States
- Location: Roughly bounded by Glynn Rd., Northdale Blvd. and Cleviden Rd., Mt. Vernon Blvd. and Wyatt Rd., and Lee Blvd., Cleveland Heights, Ohio
- Coordinates: 41°31′41″N 81°34′7″W
- Area: 25 acres (10 ha)
- Built: 1929
- Architect: Andrew J. Thomas
- Architectural style: Late 19th And 20th Century Revivals, French Norman
- NRHP reference No.: 86001662
- Added to NRHP: August 14, 1986

Forest Hill is a historic neighborhood spanning parts of Cleveland Heights and East Cleveland, Ohio, and is bordered to the north by Glynn Road, the south by Mayfield Road, by Lee Boulevard to the west and North Taylor Road to the east. Forest Hill was once the beloved summer home of oil magnate John D. Rockefeller and his family. John D. Rockefeller Jr. purchased the estate from his father in 1923 and, with New York City architect Andrew J. Thomas, planned an upscale residential and commercial development featuring distinctive French Norman style architecture. Although the Great Depression forced Rockefeller to suspend operations, following World War II others were drawn to Forest Hill to build comfortable colonial and contemporary ranch homes on the remaining open land. Design principles of the Rockefeller-Thomas plan were extended to the later development and today Forest Hill is a rich tapestry of people, homes and gardens.

== See also ==
- Forest Hill Park (Ohio)
