= Grace Barr-Kumarakulasinghe =

Pediatrician from Sri Lanka

Grace Rajamalar Barr–Kumarakulasinghe (née Sinnathamby; 7 August 1908 - 26 April 2013) was a paediatrician from Sri Lanka.

== Biography ==
Barr-Kumarakulasinghe was the seventh child of G.V. and Alice Sinnathamby. She attended Wolfendhal Girls' School, followed by Good Shepherd Convent Kotahena. She graduated from Ladies' College and originally intended to study English literature, however her brother, G. S. Sinnathamby, encouraged her to study medicine. She studied at Colombo Medical College and qualified as a doctor in 1937. In 1948, she went to the United Kingdom and completed postgraduate studies in Edinburgh and London, returning to Sri Lanka in 1953. During her career, she worked as a doctor at Lady Ridgeway Hospital, De Soysa Maternity Hospital and Castle Street Hospital for Women in Colombo.

Barr-Kumarakulasinghe was the first paediatrician in Sri Lanka to record morbidity and mortality of newborns, and gave lectures on this topic to local medical associations. She served as president of the Sri Lanka Paediatric Association and was founding joint editor of the medical journal Ceylon Journal of Obstetrics and Gynaecology.

== Personal life ==
In 1927, Sinnathamby married Gunaratnam Barr-Kumarakulasinghe, a lawyer. The couple had a son in 1948.
