= Dugway Brook Watershed =

Coordinates: 41°31′18″N 81°34′39″W

The Dugway Brook Watershed is a nine-square mile basin in Cleveland, Ohio and its east side suburbs, which drains storm runoff into Dugway Brook which is a direct tributary feeding into Lake Erie. Dugway Brook is one of the six greater "bluestone brooks" of Cuyahoga County, also including Dean Brook, Euclid Creek, Nine-Mile Creek, Pepper Creek, Mill Creek and Doan Brook, and their watersheds which feed Lake Erie. All of the bluestone brooks, including Dugway Brook, are located in Bluestone Heights, a unique terrain area in Northeast Ohio's place between Appalachian Highlands and Central Lowlands. At the Bluestone Heights geographic center, Lyman Circle in Shaker Heights, is the singular source point for the six greater bluestone brooks.

== History ==
Along with the other bluestone brooks, the east and west branches of Dugway Brook were formed about 14,000 years ago during the last glacial period, near the end of the Wisconsin glaciation. Both branches rose on or near the campus of John Carroll University in southeastern University Heights, descending and meandering roughly parallel in a northwesterly direction, then passing through Cleveland Heights, East Cleveland, and the City of Cleveland, where the two branches merge at a point just south of what is now Interstate 90. Dugway Brook then cuts northerly through the shoreline suburb of Bratenahl as a single watercourse, and finally discharges into Lake Erie.

Dugway Brook is now an almost entirely enclosed culverted watercourse, running in its natural channel under and alongside streets and city parks built around it. The brook appears to have been culverted early in the 20th century, partly because of the nuisance of septic contamination to nearby residents. This contamination became a concern of the Ohio State Board of Health, which in 1914 ordered the City of Cleveland to improve the sewer system involved by 1916, before the upstream suburbs experienced dense development. Culverting also maximized the development potential of surrounding land. About 94% of the watershed is now developed, with mostly mid-density housing. Approximately 45% of the watershed is in Cleveland Heights with 13% in University Heights, while less than 5% involves Bratenahl, Shaker Heights and South Euclid combined. A portion of Dugway Brook's content is overflow from sanitary sewer lines and illicit discharge. The City of Cleveland Heights has taken steps to keep the watershed's infrastructure clean and to reduce illicit discharge.

== West branch ==
Meadowbrook Boulevard in University Heights and Cleveland Heights follows the winding course of the upper west branch, having been built on top of its culvert at the bottom of the stream valley. The west branch of Dugway Brook passes through Cleveland Heights as an open channel at several points within a mile south of and inside historic Lake View Cemetery, founded in 1869. The cemetery quarried Euclid bluestone, a desirable, dense, finely grained and easily cut variety of sandstone, from the part of the brook situated in Cleveland Heights. Bluestone from the cemetery quarry was used to construct buildings in the cemetery, a massive wall on the western (Mayfield Road) side of the cemetery, steps leading to the tops of small hills, and other structures. Quarrymen worked with picks, iron bars, and other hand tools, and used dynamite. Little stone was wasted; at least during part of the twentieth century, a stone crusher, positioned on a basal layer of stone flooring the quarry, was used to crush scraps to be used as foundations for cemetery monuments. The quarry here was active until the mid-1930s.

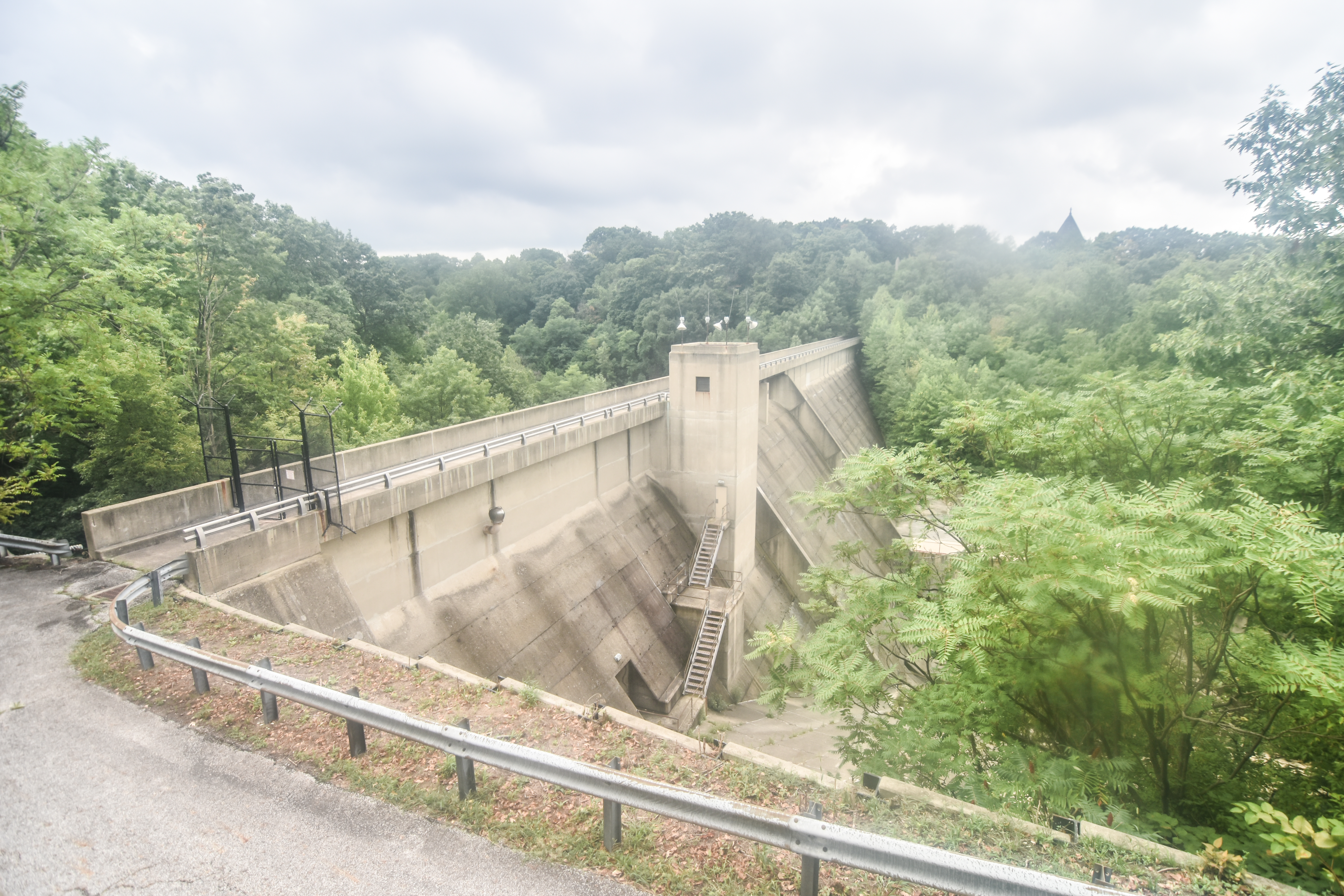
Lakeview Cemetery Dam

In 1975, trustees of Lake View Cemetery sued the cities of University Heights and Cleveland Heights to stop their sewer expansions upstream to the south, anticipating worsening of the flooding of the west branch caused by heavy rains. The Cuyahoga County Court of Common Pleas had recently ordered the creation of the Cleveland Regional Sewer District (now the Northeast Ohio Regional Sewer District). With the cemetery’s contribution of 10 acres (40,000 m^{2}) of its land, the District constructed the massive concrete Lake View Cemetery Flood Control Dam in 1978 at an initial cost of $6,300,000.00, in spite of public criticism that the scope and cost of this solution far exceeded the severity of the problem. At the time of its completion, it was the largest concrete dam located east of the Mississippi River.

== East branch ==
The east branch of Dugway Brook is visible from Cedar Road in University Heights as a short open channel, before passing under Cain Park, Cumberland Park, and passing under and openly cutting through what is now Forest Hill Park, once the summer estate of John D. Rockefeller. Rockefeller also quarried parts of Dugway Brook for the Euclid bluestone he used to construct some of the small bridges and other structures on Forest Hill.
