= Forest Hill Park (Ohio) =

- U.S. National Register of Historic Places
- U.S. Historic district
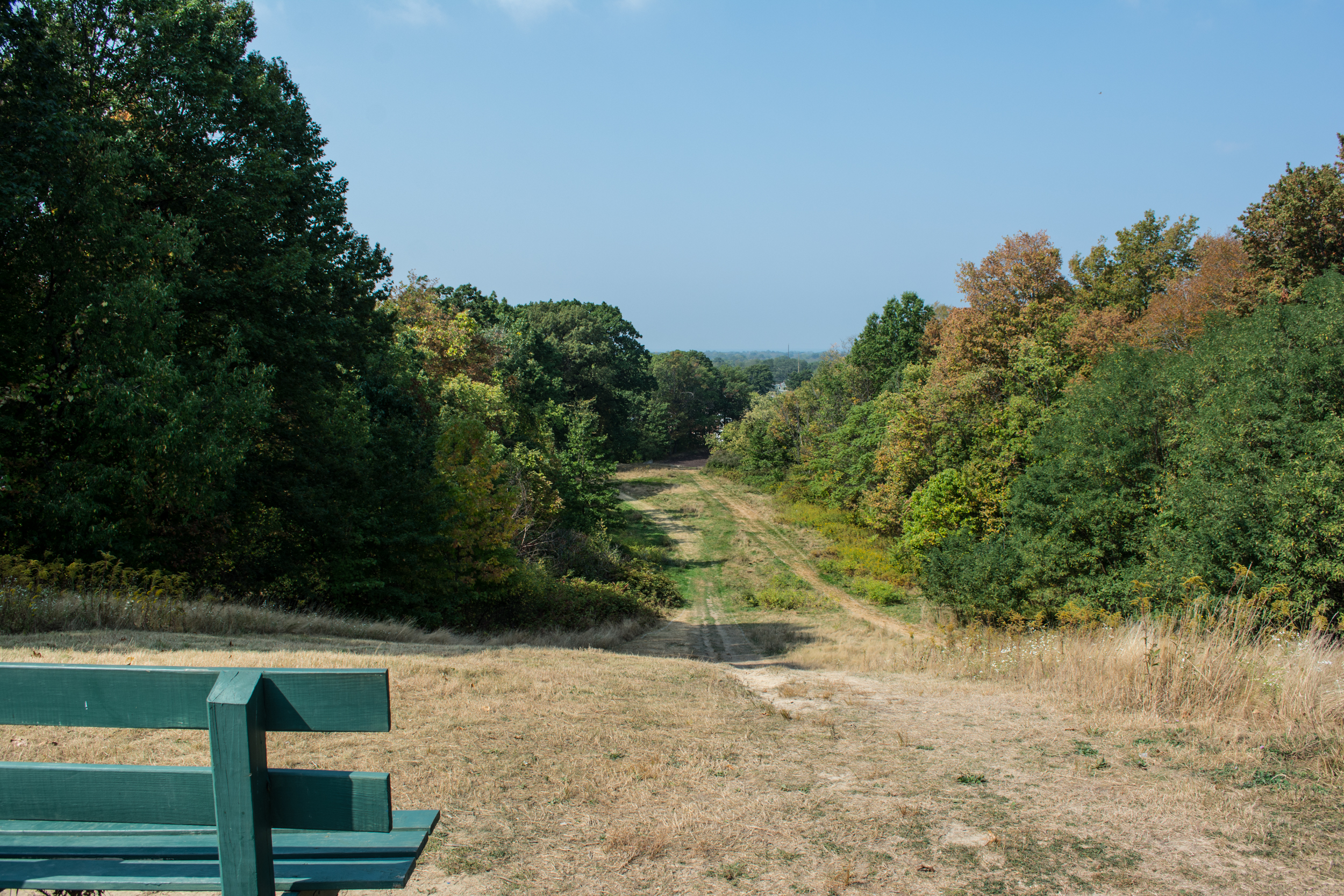
- Looking west from the site of the Rockefeller home down Toboggan Hill

- Location within Ohio Location within the United States
- Location: East Cleveland, Ohio & Cleveland Heights, Ohio
- Coordinates: 41°31′20″N 81°34′37″W
- Built: 1938
- Architect: Albert Davis Taylor
- NRHP reference No.: 98000072
- Added to NRHP: February 27, 1998

Forest Hill Park is an historic urban park that was a portion of John D. Rockefeller's estate, located in East Cleveland and Cleveland Heights, Ohio. Two-thirds of the park lie in East Cleveland, and the remaining third is in Cleveland Heights. The 248-acre (1.00 km^{2}) park has six baseball diamonds (four lit), six lit tennis courts and walking trails that have retained the natural green space as intended by John D. Rockefeller Jr., who deeded the park to the two cities in 1936. Albert Davis Taylor was the park's landscape architect. It is the largest single body of green space between two large metroparks on the far east and west sides of Cleveland.

== History ==
The park was bought by Rockefeller in 1873 as a summer estate, which was used by Rockefeller's family until 1915. A fire destroyed the estate house in 1917. In 1939 Rockefeller transferred 1/3 (one-third) of the property to Cleveland Heights and 2/3 (two-thirds) to East Cleveland.

On February 27, 1998, it was added to the National Register of Historic Places.

== See also ==
- Forest Hill, Ohio
