= Christine De Vinne =

American academic administrator

President of Ursuline College
- In office July 1, 2015 – June 30, 2024
- Preceded by: Diana Stano

Personal details
- Born: 1949 (age 76–77)
- Education: Ursuline College; University of Notre Dame; Ohio State University

Christine De Vinne (born 1949) is an American academic administrator and Ursuline sister serving as the president of Ursuline College since 2015. She was the vice president for academic affairs at the Notre Dame of Maryland University from 2010 to 2015.

== Life ==
De Vinne was born in 1949. She was raised in Cleveland Heights, Ohio and attended Saint Ann School and Beaumont School. She joined the Ursuline Sisters of Cleveland after high school. She earned a bachelor's degree in mathematics, summa cum laude, from Ursuline College in 1973. De Vinne was a school teacher in parish elementary schools at Christ the King in East Cleveland, Saint Clare in Lyndhurst, and Saint Mary Magdalene in Willowick from 1973 to 1985. In 1985 she earned a M.A. in English from the University of Notre Dame. She became an assistant principal at the Beaumont School following her graduation.

De Vinne completed a Ph.D. in English from the Ohio State University in 1996. Her dissertation was titled, Confessional Narrative: the Rhetoric of Guilt in American Autobiography. James Phelan was her doctoral advisor. In 1996, she then joined the English department and Ursuline studies program at Ursuline College. She directed the program from 1999 to 2001. From 2001 to 2010, she was dean of the school of arts and sciences. From 2010 to 2015, she served as the vice president for academic affairs at the Notre Dame of Maryland University. On July 1, 2015, De Vinne became the 17th president of Ursuline College. She succeeded Diana Stano. She served as president of the American Name Society. De Vinne retired from Ursuline College on June 30, 2024.
