= Hal Becker =

American writer (born 1954)

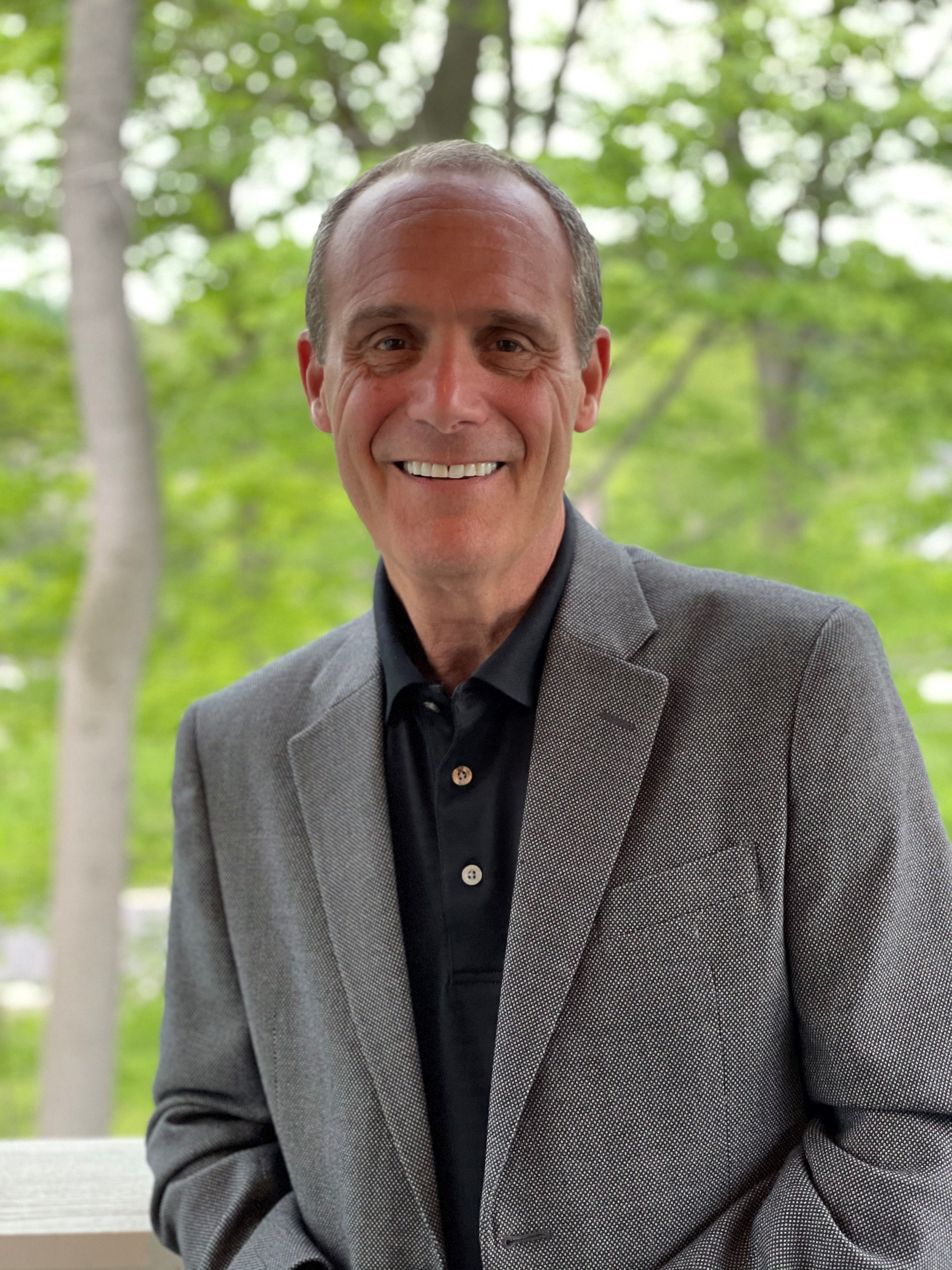
- Born: October 14, 1954 (age 71); Cleveland, Ohio, U.S.
- Education: John Carroll University
- Occupations: Author, sales trainer, professional speaker
- Notable credit(s): Can I Have 5 Minutes Of Your Time? (1993); At Your Service (1998); Get What You Want!! (2004); Hal Becker's Ultimate Sales Book (2012); Lip Service (2001)
- Spouse: Holly Becker (m. 1998)
- Children: Nicole Simko
- Website: www.halbecker.com

Hal Becker (born 1954) is an American author and nationally known expert on the subjects of sales, customer service and negotiating. He conducts seminars or provides consultations to more than 140 organizations a year, including, IBM, Disney, New York Life, United Airlines, Verizon, Terminix, AT&T, Pearle Vision and Cintas. His best known books are Can I Have 5 Minutes Of Your Time?, Lip Service and Hal Becker's Ultimate Sales Book, A Revolutionary Training Manual Guaranteed to Improve Your Skills and Inflate Your Net Worth.

== Education ==
Becker graduated from Cleveland Heights High School in 1972. In 1993, he was inducted into the Heights Hall of Fame with ten other graduates.

From John Carroll University, Becker earned a bachelor's degree in sociology in 1976. At John Carroll, he worked as the union director of special events, booking concerts on campus.

== Career ==
In 1977, at the age of 22, Becker was named the #1 salesperson among a national sales force of 11,000 at Xerox Corporation. In 1983, he launched one of America's first customer service telemarketing firms called Direct Opinions. That same year he was diagnosed with and survived cancer. In 1990, he sold Direct Opinions to devote time to consulting and presenting lectures around the world.

Becker is a syndicated writer in 46 business journal newspapers nationwide.

He is a past chairman of Better Business Bureau Serving Greater Cleveland and the Solon Chamber of Commerce, and has also sat on boards including Better Business Bureau, March of Dimes, COSE, University of Akron Business School, Cleveland Health Museum/Natural History Museum, Healthy Cities Ohio, Sales & Marketing Executives and Montefiore Nursing Home, and the Chagrin Valley Chamber of Commerce.

== Publications ==
- Can I Have 5 Minutes of Your Time?: A No Nonsense Fun Approach to Sales by Hal Becker and Florence Mustric (1993)
- At Your Service: Calamities, Catastrophes, and Other Curiosities of Customer Service by Hal B. Becker (1998)
- Lip Service: 50 Humorous Stories of the Worst Customer Service in America and Interviews with the 10 Best Companies in the World by Hal B. Becker (2001)
- Get What You Want!! A Fun, Upbeat and Fresh Approach to Negotiating by Hal B. Becker, Jon Lief, and Florence Mustric (2004)
- Hal Becker's Ultimate Sales Book, A Revolutionary Training Manual Guaranteed to Improve Your Skills and Inflate Your Net Worth by Hal B. Becker (2012)

== Awards and honors ==
- 1977 #1 salesperson among a national sales force of 11,000 at Xerox
- 1994 Heights High School Hall of Fame inductee
- 2000 Toastmasters International Communication and Leadership Award
- 2002 National Speakers Association CSP Award
- 2004 The Distinguished Marketing and Sales Awards
