= Ursuline College =

Catholic college in Pepper Pike, Ohio, US

- Motto: Make Your World More
- Type: Private college
- Active: 1871–2026
- Affiliations: NCAA Division II – G-MAC
- Religious affiliation: Catholic
- Location: Pepper Pike, Ohio, United States; 41°29′42″N 81°28′00″W
- Colors: Blue & Gold
- Nickname: Arrows
- Mascot: Arrows
- Website: ursuline.edu

Ursuline College was a private Catholic college in Pepper Pike, Ohio, United States. It was founded in 1871 by the Ursuline Sisters of Cleveland and is one of the oldest institutions of higher education for women in the United States and the first Catholic women's college in Ohio. It announced plans to merge with Gannon University in September 2024 and the merger was completed in November 2026.

== History ==
In 1997 Ursuline College began offering an accelerated nursing degree program for working adults (UCAP).

In 2013, Ursuline College successfully gained NCAA Division II status. One week later, an EF1 tornado with winds reaching 110 mph touched down on the Ursuline College campus, downing multiple trees and destroying an exterior wall of the gymnasium. In 2015, the repaired and renovated gymnasium reopened as the Sister Diana Stano Athletic Center. The facility features the Jane and Lee Seidman Gymnasium, a 1,000 seat multi-sport venue that is home to the Arrows basketball and volleyball team.

In 2024, the college's board of trustees approved plans to merge the college with Gannon University. Ursuline will become a part of Gannon as "Ursuline College Campus of Gannon University" with its own academic and athletic programs. The merger was finalized in November 2026.

=== List of presidents ===
- Diana Stano, 1997–2015
- Christine De Vinne, 2015–2024
- David King, 2024–2026

== Academics ==
Ursuline College offered a range of undergraduate and graduate studies, including 30 undergraduate, 9 graduate, and 10 degree-completion programs. In 2024, Ursuline had a total student population of 970, with 70% undergraduate and 30% graduate students. While the traditional undergraduate programs remained women-focused, all of the programs welcomed both women and men. Ursuline's student body consisted of 91% female students and 9% male students as of 2024.

== Athletics ==
Ursuline athletics mark

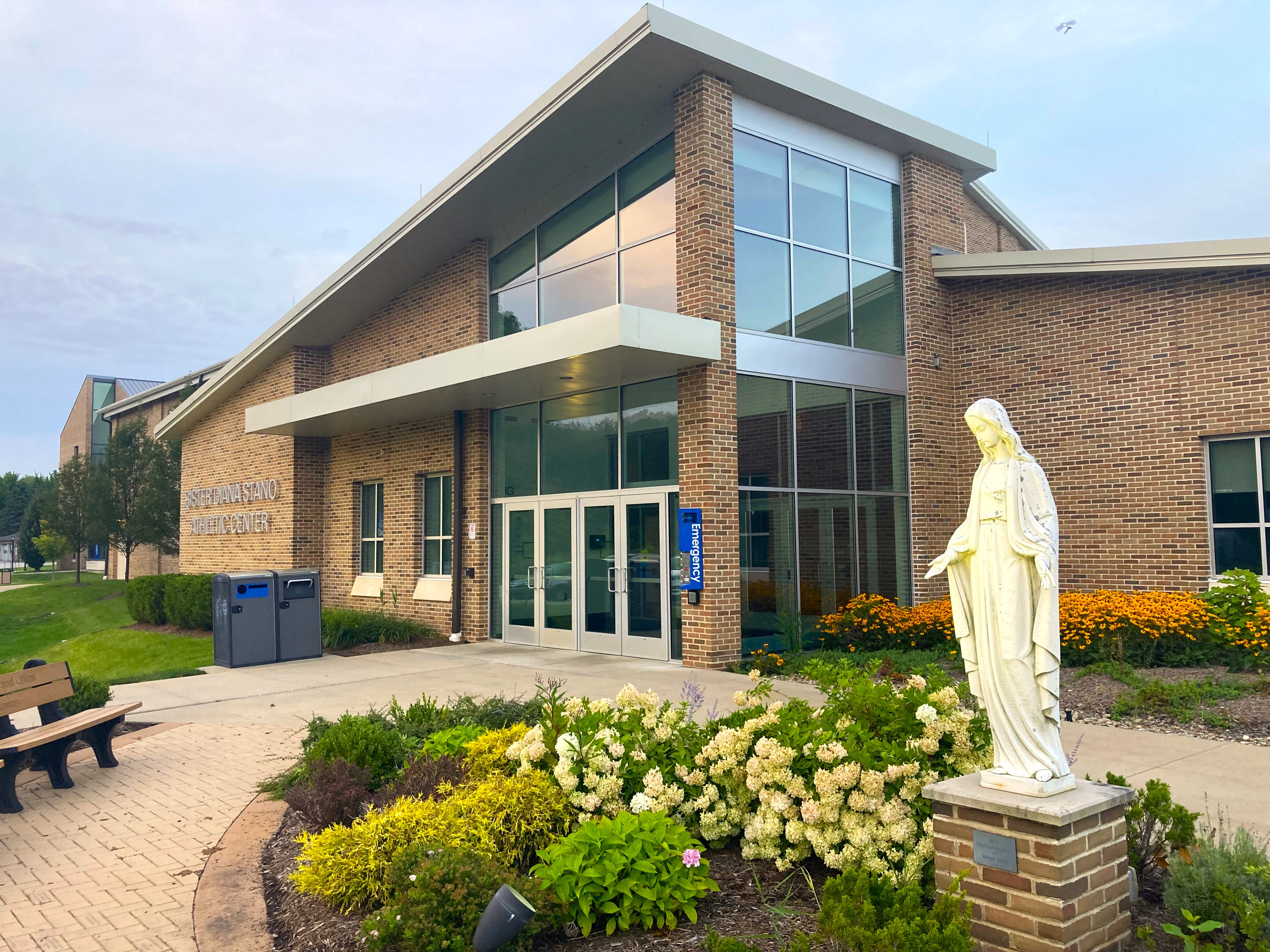
Sister Diana Stano Athletic Center

Ursuline College teams participated as a member of the National Collegiate Athletic Association's Division II. The Arrows were a member of the Great Midwest Athletic Conference (G-MAC), but used to be a member of the National Association of Intercollegiate Athletics' now-defunct American Mideast Conference (AMC) until the 2011–12 season.

In 2024, Ursuline College became the first four-year institution of higher learning in Ohio to add intercollegiate women's flag football to its athletics program.
