= Rosemarie Albrecht =

Nazi German-Japanese otorhinolaryngologist

- ローズマリー・アルブレヒト
- Born: Marie Johanna Albrecht; March 19, 1915; Kobe, Empire of Japan
- Died: January 7, 2008 (aged 92); Jena, Germany
- Education: University of Hamburg, Friedrich Schiller University of Jena, University of Rostock
- Occupations: Otorhinolaryngologist, college professor
- Criminal charges: War crimes
- Criminal penalty: not guilty by reason of insanity

Rosemarie Albrecht (March 19, 1915 - January 7, 2008) was a German-Japanese otorhinolaryngologist who worked for Nazi Germany's Aktion T4 programme during World War II. From 1964 to 1966, Albrecht was investigated for 160 murders conducted while she was a part of Aktion T4. However, Albrecht was unfit to stand trial and the case was dropped in 2005. Rosemarie lived in Jena until her death in 2008.

== Early life and education ==
Born Marie Johanna Albrecht to a German and a Japanese merchant in the city of Kobe. In 1918, Rosemarie moved to Rostock and graduated from high school there in 1935. Rosemarie then went to the University of Hamburg, Friedrich Schiller University of Jena, and the University of Rostock. Following the completion of her education in 1940, she published a dissertation entitled, The Vitamin C Content of Breast Milk Before and After Boiling.

=== World War II ===
In 1940, Rosemarie began to work at Asklepios Specialist Clinic Sanatorium in Stadtroda, initially as a mandatory assistant and later a physician in the women's ward. During this time, Rosemarie began to work for Aktion T4 and began to euthanize several mentally and physically disabled patients until 1942, when she was assigned to the ENT Clinic at the University of Jena, where she studied otorhinolaryngology until 1946.

== Post-war ==
In 1948, Rosemarie became a lecturer at the University of Jena. In 1952, she became the head physician at the university's ENT and later became the chairwoman of the otolaryngology department for the Erfurt Medical Academy. In 1957, she was hired by Professor Johannes Carl August Eduard Zange to be a college professor at the Friedrich Schiller University of Jena. Rosemarie was also elected to the board of the German Society for Otorhinolaryngology and served as Dean of the Medical Faculty of Friedrich Schiller University Jena from 1965 to 1967. Simultaneously, she held the Chair of Otorhinolaryngology at the Academy for Medical Continuing Education of the GDR and was thus involved in developing the standards for ENT specialists. Albrecht retired in 1975 at the age of 60.

=== Investigation ===
In 1964, the Gera district office of the Stasi launched an investigation into Rosemarie's background during the war but was forcefully halted by the Stasi in East Berlin. In 2004, the case was renewed following Operation Last Chance, launched by the Simon Wiesenthal Center to bring former Nazi officials to justice. Rosemarie was once again investigated but was deemed unfit to stand trial and was not guilty by reason of insanity in February 2005. Rosemarie died 3 years later at her home, aged 92.

== Honors ==
- 1953: Honoured Doctor of the People
- 1965: Member of the Leopoldina
- 1967: Member of the Academy of Sciences of the GDR
- 1972: National Prize, Third Class, of the GDR
- 1972: Patriotic Order of Merit in Gold
- 1975: Honored University Professor of the GDR
- 1996: Honorary member of the German Society for Otorhinolaryngology
- Member of the Collegium Oto-Rhino-Laryngologicum Amicitiae Sacrum
