= Bruce F. Scharschmidt =

American physician-scientist (born 1946)

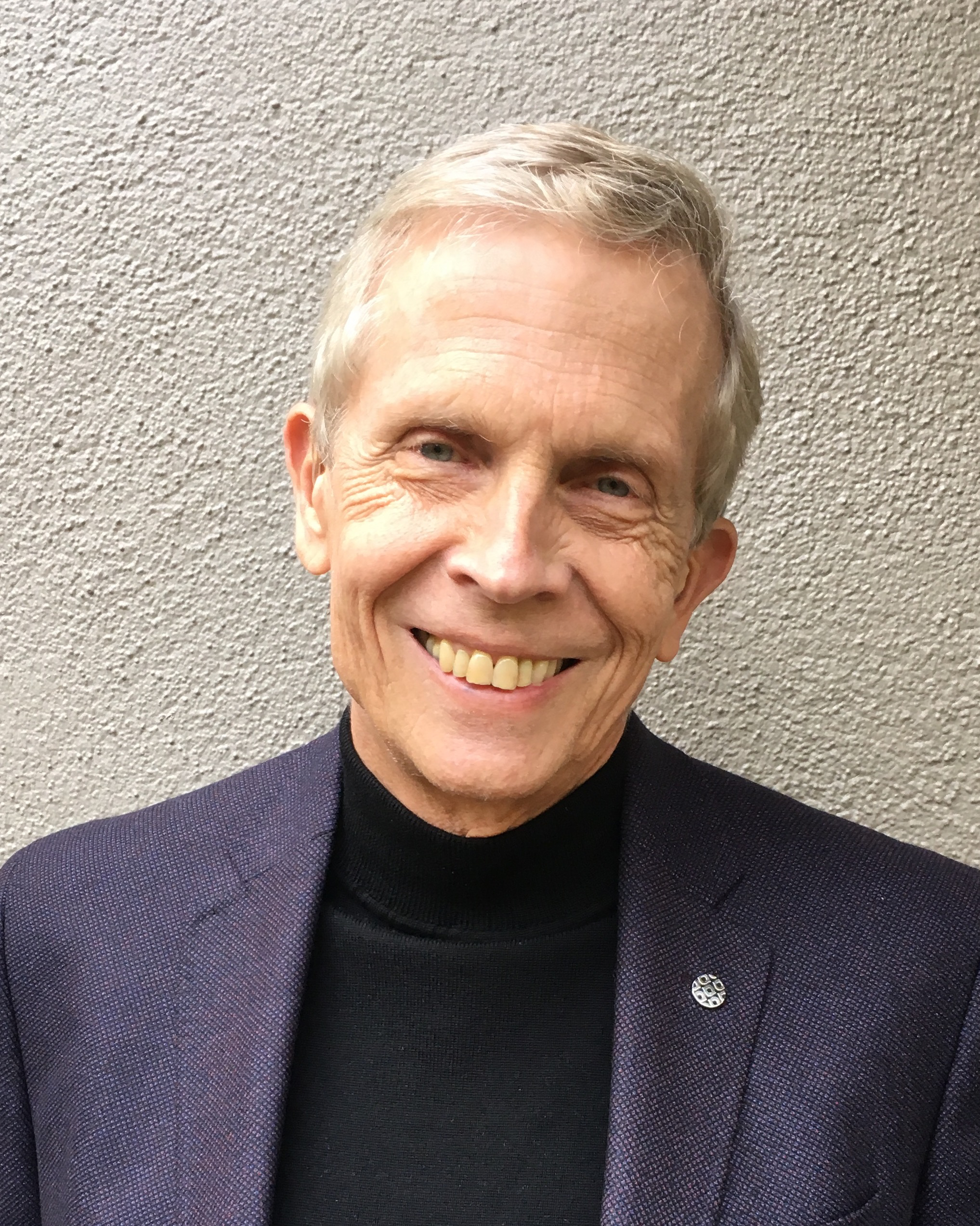
Bruce F. Scharschmidt

Bruce F. Scharschmidt (born March 6, 1946) is an American physician-scientist whose career has spanned academic, business and non-profit sectors. He was a major contributor to the care of patients with liver disease and advancement of liver transplantation.

== Personal life ==
Scharschmidt was born in East Cleveland, Ohio. He now lives in San Francisco, California with his wife, Peggy S. Crawford M.D. Their son and daughter, Drs. Brent and Tiffany Scharschmidt and their families also live in the San Francisco Bay Area.

== Education and academic career ==
Scharschmidt graduated from Shaw High School in East Cleveland and completed his undergraduate and medical education in Northwestern University’s Honors (6-year) Program in Medical Education. After completing his residency training in Internal Medicine at the University of California, San Francisco (UCSF) in 1972, Scharschmidt worked for three years as a Clinical Associate at the National Institutes of Health, where he was a founding member of the Liver Disease Research Branch of NIDDK.

Scharschmidt returned to UCSF in 1975 for subspecialty training in gastroenterology, and in 1977 joined the UCSF faculty. In 1985, he became a Professor of Medicine and, in 1990, was named Chief of the Gastroenterology division.

While at UCSF, for two decades Scharschmidt led an independent NIH-funded research laboratory focused on liver physiology and the pathophysiology of liver disease. His research team elucidated cellular mechanisms of bile formation, including characterization of the hepatic uptake of organic anions such as bilirubin, demonstrated that hepatic update of bile acids is sodium-coupled and electrogenic, identified of the presence on the basolateral hepatocyte membrane of a sodium-coupled bicarbonate transporter critical to intracellular pH regulation, and reported of the initial evidence that hepatic bile acid secretion is mediated by an ATP-dependent transporter (later identified and shown to be mutated in progressive familial intrahepatic cholestasis type 2). His team also collaborated in the identification of the gene that is responsible for progressive familial intrahepatic cholestasis type 1, previously known as Byler's disease, as well as benign recurrent intrahepatic cholestasis.

Scharschmidt was an invited speaker at the 1982 NIH Consensus conference on Liver Transplantation, where he reviewed and presented the results of liver transplantation, which at that time was carried out in only four centers worldwide, and authored the then definitive article on liver transplantation outcomes. The NIH Consensus Conference concluded that liver transplantation was no longer experimental, which paved the way for its reimbursement and availability at centers throughout the US and worldwide. With his UCSF colleagues in surgery, Scharschmidt helped launch the UCSF liver transplant program. As a member of the Training and Workforce Committee of the American Association for the Study of Liver Diseases, he worked with his colleagues to set current standards for training in hepatology, including special certification in transplant hepatology.

== Mentoring ==
More than 15 individuals trained directly with Scharschmidt, several of whom became gastroenterology division chiefs, and/or deans and dozens more completed the UCSF gastroenterology training program for which he was responsible. He authored an invited article on the topic of mentoring for Gastroenterology.

== Business career ==
In 1996, Scharschmidt moved to Chiron Corporation, where he served as Corporate VP responsible for the clinical development of therapeutics and vaccines until its acquisition in 2006 by Novartis, where he remained for two years. While at Chiron and Novartis, his team was responsible for the successful clinical development and approval of therapeutics, including interleukin 2 for melanoma., and participated in the development of several new vaccines approved in the US and/or Europe, including the first influenza vaccine manufactured using mammalian cell culture rather than the traditional fertilized chicken eggs, the first adjuvanted flu vaccine, the meningococcal C vaccine used to help curb deadly outbreaks in Canada and the UK, a tetravalent meningococcal vaccine effective against A, C, Y & W strains, and the first vaccine against meningococcus B.

In April 2008, Scharschmidt left Novartis to join Hyperion Therapeutics, a bay area biotech startup which was in early phase development of an ammonia lowering agent for patients with urea cycle disorders (UCDs). As a member of Hyperion's management team, he was involved in taking the company public in 2012 (HPTX, NASDAQ), Hyperion's successful secondary stock offering in 2013, and sale of the company to Horizon Pharma in May 2015.

Scharschmidt currently serves as Board Member and/or consultant to several biotechnology companies in the US and abroad.

== Editorships, awards and patents ==
Scharschmidt was elected to membership in the American Society for Clinical Investigation (ASCI) in 1982, served as ASCI President from 1992-93 and as Editor-in-Chief of the Journal of Clinical Investigation (JCI) from 1987-1992. He is also a member of the Association of American Physicians.

Scharschmidt served as Associate Editor of Gastroenterology (1981-1986), Associate Editor of the textbook Gastrointestinal and Liver Disease, (5th, 6th, and 7th Editions) and as Editor of the Pocket Clinician textbook on Internal Medicine. He received the Western Gastroenterological Association Research Award (1988), the University of Toronto Sheila Sherlock Research Award (1991), was 1998 Honoree of the American Liver Foundation Northern CA Division's Salute to Excellence, and was named 2010 Distinguished Northwestern Feinberg School of Medicine Alumnus of the year.

Scharschmidt is inventor or co-inventor on multiple US (Patent Nos. 5,308,833, 8,404,215, 8,642,012, 9,095,559, 13,610,580,) and international patients with multiple patents pending.

== Publications ==
Medical: Scharschmidt has authored over 200 research and review articles. The Hyperion clinical trials designed under Scharschmidt have resulted in over 20 publications, address not only with the performance characteristics of RAVICTI, but also the use of blood and urine metabolites for drug dosing and the optimal timing and target levels for blood ammonia in patients with urea cycle disorders so as to minimize the risk and frequency of hyperammonemic crises. Bruce's team at Hyperion also designed and executed a large randomized, double-blind placebo controlled trial which demonstrated that lowering ammonia in patients with cirrhosis complicated by hepatic encephalopathy (HE) decreases the risk and frequency of HE episodes. These findings, presented at the plenary session of American Association for the Study of Liver Disease, established that ammonia is not just a correlate, but a cause of HE and, as with UCDs, established the optimal timing and target levels for blood ammonia in cirrhotics so as to minimize their risk and frequency of HE episodes. He also helped define the natural history of HE as well as methodology for its diagnosis.

== Service and non-profit ==
As ASCI President, Scharschmidt initiated and obtained industry and NSF funding for a High School Science Teacher Summer Scholarship Program, which paired science teachers with ASCI mentors so as to enable them to teach science as the exciting discipline of discovery. Bruce has served on the National Board of Directors of the American Liver Foundation, on the External Advisory Board for the Clinical Translational Science Award at Northwestern/Feinberg School of Medicine, where he also served as President of the Medical Alumni Association Board from 2015 to 2017. He has chaired the Translational Team of the Gladstone Institutes, where he is also a member of the President's Council. He ran in the 2005 and 2006 Boston Marathons and participated in the 2008 Mt. Shasta Climb to raise funds for the American Liver Foundation, organized with his son in 2009 the “Biking For Burma’s Malnourished” bike ride from Central Thailand to the Burma Border to raise money for Global Health Access Program, and in 2010 co-founded the ‘Cure the Cycle Challenge’ for the National Urea Cycle Disorders Foundation in which he participated as a rider from 2010 through 2015.
