= Yuri Nikiforov (scientist) =

American scientist

Dr. Yuri Nikiforov (Russian: Юрий Ефимович Никифоров, romanized: Yury Yefimovich Nikiforov; born 12 September 1962) is an American pathologist who revolutionized the understanding of thyroid cancer, most recently winning a two-year battle in which the World Health Organization agreed in 2017 to reclassify non-invasive thyroid tumors to non-cancerogenic liaisons. Those tumors typically have some, but not all, characteristics of cancer. The WHO has agreed to change the term for the tumors from Encapsulated Follicular Variant of Papillary Thyroid Carcinoma to Noninvasive Follicular Thyroid Neoplasm With Papillary-like Nuclear Features, or NIFTP. About 45,000 people a year are diagnosed with NIFTP in the world. The decision led to a change in the protocol of medical treatment, which no longer required removal of the whole thyroid gland from such patients as well as ended the use of radioactive iodine, extending their life expectancy and quality of life. The patients still undergo surgery, in which their thyroid tumors are removed, typically with half, but not all, of the thyroid gland.

== Education and research ==
Yuri Yefimovich Nikiforov was born on 12 September 1962 in Minsk, Byelorussian SSR, Soviet Union

Nikiforov graduated from the Minsk Medical Institute in Belarus in 1985 with honors and received his doctoral degree.

Nikiforov was invited to continue his work in the United States following his groundbreaking research into the epidemic of pediatric thyroid cancer after the 1986 Chernobyl nuclear plant catastrophe in Ukraine. He moved to the U.S. in 1993 together with his wife and fellow scientist Marina Nikiforova (Марина Николаевна Никифорова, born April 23, 1961, in Piatigorsk, Russia) and their two children. The family resided in Cincinnati, OH, before moving to Pittsburgh, PA, in 2006. Upon arriving in the United States, Nikiforov worked at the Rhode Island Hospital, Brown University, in Providence, RI, Cedar-Cinai Medical Center, Los Angeles, CA, and University of Cincinnati, OH, where he completed his post-doctoral training in thyroid cancer genetics and focused his research on the genetics and pathology of thyroid cancer. He has received international acclaim for the discovery of several novel types of chromosomal rearrangements in thyroid cancer, which also linked them to exposure to ionizing radiation. He has discovered, detailed and scientifically described the exact mechanisms of radiation damage to human DNA on a molecular basis and explained why that damage causes cancer. His research interests evolved over time to include molecular diagnostic of thyroid and other types of cancer.

Nikiforov and his team's discoveries and scientific research of the field of genetics of thyroid cancer during almost three decades since the 1990s have led to the creation of genetic molecular test for thyroid nodules, which was first applied to patient care in 2007, It has been evolved and expanded since then. The test was created by Nikiforov and his wife, Dr. Marina Nikiforova, at the University of Pittsburgh Medical Center (UPMC) and the University of Pittsburgh School of Medicine. Dr. Marina Nikiforova has led clinical implementation of the test. (9, 20, 23, 24, 15) The test allows doctors to access and analyze the genetic material of questionable thyroid nodules, which are not reliably identified via traditional fine needle biopsies, without surgically removing them. The test, performed via fine needle, distinguishes between benign and cancerous thyroid nodules using a very small sample of cells. (10, 11, 12, 13)

The U.S. National Institute of Health (NIH), a subsidiary of the U.S. Department of Health and Human Services that serves as the nation's medical research agency, has been funding Nikiforov's research since year 2000. Nikiforov, an elected member of the American Society for Clinical Investigation, has been working at the University of Pittsburgh since 2006. As of 2020, he is a professor of pathology at the University of Pittsburgh and director of the Division of Molecular & Genomic Pathology. Together with his team, he has authored about 200 research articles and book chapters. His work has been published by publications including Science, Cell, Journal of Clinical Investigation, Proceedings of the National Academy of Sciences of the US, and JAMA Oncology. He is a senior editor of the textbook Diagnostic Pathology and Molecular Genetics of the Thyroid.

== Chernobyl ==
At the time of the Chernobyl nuclear explosion on April 26, 1986, Nikiforov lived in Minsk, the capital of Belarus, just about 200 miles from the site of the catastrophe. Following the Chernobyl disaster, which is now known as the world's worst nuclear plant explosion in history, Nikiforov noticed an increase in pediatric thyroid cancer by 1990, which was unheard of in global health care at the time. He focused his research on that specific area, helping to prove over time that the cancer was caused by the radioactive isotope Iodine-131, vast quantities of which were released due to the plant explosion. Millions of children in the regions of Ukraine, Belarus, and Russia around Chernobyl breathed it in. They consumed it with milk, fruits and vegetables as the Soviet government withheld information about the catastrophe from both its people and the international community for several days following the explosion and collapse of the plant's fourth reactor on April 26, 1986. Children received critical doses of the isotope within a month after the explosion. The Soviet government could have prevented most of the thyroid cancer cases following the catastrophe had it admitted the magnitude of the disaster, distributed potassium iodide pills in the most radiation-contaminated regions, and warned against consuming milk, fruits and vegetables contaminated with radioactivity. In Kiev, radiation increased more than 100-fold following the Chernobyl explosion. Potassium iodine saturates the thyroid gland with safe iodine and protects it against radioactive iodine. Incidence of pediatric thyroid cancer rose 200-fold in Belarus by 1994 from 1985 because of the radiation release following the explosion and fire at the nuclear plant. In some parts of the country, the cancer rate rose 2,000-fold. Prior to the Chernobyl catastrophe, one in 2 million children was diagnosed with thyroid cancer, the same as in Great Britain. That statistics increased to 1 in 10,000 children by 1994, according to WHO. However, in some parts of Belarus the rate was even higher, at 1 in 1,000 children. In northern regions of Ukraine that neighbor Chernobyl pediatric thyroid cancer rates increased 100-fold by 1994 from 1985.

== Awards ==
- 2007 Van Meter Award from the American Thyroid Association
- 2010 Thomas Jefferson Medical College, Pathology Resident Award Lecture
- 2012 The Endocrine's Society International Award for Publishing Excellence in The Journal of Clinical Endocrinology & Metabolism (JCEM)
- 2014 The Light of Light Foundation Honorary Award
- 2016 The Aldo Pinchera Award from the Italian Thyroid Carcinoma Observatory
- 2017 The Sidney H. Ingbar Distinguished Lectureship Award from the American Thyroid Association.

== Publications ==
- Mehta V, Nikiforov YE, Ferris RL. Use of molecular biomarkers in FNA specimens to personalize treatment for thyroid surgery. Head & Neck. 2013; 35(10):1499-506.
- Yousem SA, Dacic S, Nikiforov YE, Nikiforova M. Pulmonary Langerhans Cell Histiocytosis: Profiling of Multifocal Tumors Using Next-Generation Sequencing Identifies Concordant Occurrence of BRAF V600E Mutations. Chest. 2013, 143(6):1679-84.
- Dettmer M, Vogetseder A, Durso MB, Moch H, Komminoth P, Perren A, Nikiforov YE, Nikiforova MN. MicroRNA Expression Array Identifies Novel Diagnostic Markers for Conventional and Oncocytic Follicular Thyroid Carcinomas. J Clin Endocrinol Metab. 2013, 98:E1-7.
- Gandhi M, Evdokimova VN, Cuenco KT, Bakkenist CJ, Nikiforov YE. Homologous chromosomes move and rapidly initiate contact at the sites of double-strand breaks in genes in G0-phase human cells. Cell Cycle. 2013, 12(4):547-52.
- Chan JM, Bilodeau E, Celin S, Nikiforov Y, Johnson JT. Ewing sarcoma of the thyroid: Report of 2 cases and review of the literature. Head Neck. 2013 Mar 18. doi: 10.1002/hed.23240. [Epub ahead of print]
- Gupta N, Dasyam AK, Carty SE, Nikiforova MN, Ohori NP, Armstrong M, Yip L, Lebeau SO, McCoy KL, Coyne C, Stang MT, Johnson J, Ferris RL, Seethala R, Nikiforov YE, Hodak SP. RAS Mutations in Thyroid FNA Specimens Are Highly Predictive of Predominantly Low-Risk Follicular-Pattern Cancers. J Clin Endocrinol Metab. 2013 98:E914-22.
- Leeman-Neill RJ, Brenner AV, Little MP, Bogdanova TI, Hatch M, Zurnadzy LY, Mabuchi K, Tronko MD, Nikiforov YE. RET/PTC and PAX8/PPARγ chromosomal rearrangements in post-Chernobyl thyroid cancer and their association with iodine-131 radiation dose and other characteristics. Cancer. 2013, 119(10):1792-9.
- Dettmer MS, Perren A, Moch H, Komminoth P, Nikiforov YE, Nikiforova MN. Comprehensive microRNA expression profiling identifies novel markers in follicular variant of papillary thyroid carcinoma. Thyroid. 2013; 23(11): 1383–1389.
- Ohori NP, Wolfe J, Hodak SP, Lebeau SO, Yip L, Carty SE, Duvvuri U, Schoedel KE, Nikiforova MN, Nikiforov YE. "Colloid-Rich" follicular neoplasm/suspicious for follicular neoplasm thyroid fine-needle aspiration specimens: Cytologic, histologic, and molecular basis for considering an alternate view. Cancer Cytopathol. 2013; Dec; 121(12): 718–28.
- Bansal M, Gandhi M, Ferris RL, Nikiforova MN, Yip L, Carty SE, Nikiforov YE. Molecular and Histopathologic Characteristics of Multifocal Papillary Thyroid Carcinoma. Am J Surg Pathol. 2013; 37: 1586–1591.
- Nikiforova MN, Wald AI, Roy S, Durso MB, Nikiforov YE. Targeted next-generation sequencing panel (ThyroSeq) for detection of mutations in thyroid cancer. J Clin Endocrinol Metab. 2013, 98(11): E1852-60.
- Buryk MA, Monaco SE, Witchel SF, Mehta DK, Gurtunca N, Nikiforov YE, Simons JP. Preoperative cytology with molecular analysis to help guide surgery for pediatric thyroid nodules. Int J Pediatr Otorhinolaryngol. 2013, 77(10):1697-700.
- Dillon LW, Pierce LC, Lehman CE, Nikiforov YE, Wang YH. DNA topoisomerases participate in fragility of the oncogene RET. PLoS One. 2013 Sep 11;8(9):e75741.
- Mehta RS, Carty SE, Ohori NP, Hodak SP, Coyne C, LeBeau SO, Tublin ME, Stang MT, Johnson JT, McCoy KL, Nikiforova MN, Nikiforov YE, Yip L. Nodule size is an independent predictor of malignancy in mutation-negative nodules with follicular lesion of undetermined significance cytology. Surgery. 2013 Oct;154(4):730-6; discussion 736–8.
- Wharry LI, McCoy KL, Stang MT, Armstrong MJ, Lebeau SO, Tublin ME, Sholosh B, Silbermann A, Ohori NP, Nikiforov YE, Hodak SP, Carty SE, Yip L. Thyroid Nodules (>4 cm): Can Ultrasound and Cytology Reliably Exclude Cancer? World J Surg. 2014, 38:614-621.
- Roy S, Durso MB, Wald A, Nikiforov YE, Nikiforova MN. SeqReporter: Automating Next-Generation Sequencing Result Interpretation and Reporting Workflow in a Clinical Laboratory. J Mol Diagn. 2014 Jan;16(1):11-22.
- Jung CK, Little MP, Lubin JH, Brenner AV, Wells SA Jr, Sigurdson AJ, Nikiforov YE. The increase in thyroid cancer incidence during the last four decades is accompanied by a high frequency of BRAF mutations and a sharp increase in RAS mutations. J Clin Endocrinol Metab. 2014, 99:E276-85.
- Leeman-Neill RJ, Kelly LM, Liu P, Brenner AV, Little MP, Bogdanova TI, Evdokimova VE, Hatch M, Zurnadzy LY, Nikiforova MN, Yue NJ, Zhang M, Mabuchi K, Tronko MD, Nikiforov YE. ETV6-NTRK3 is a common chromosomal rearrangement in radiation-associated thyroid cancer. Cancer 2014, 120:799-807.
- Dacic S, Luvison A, Evdokimova V, Kelly L, Siegfried JM, Villaruz LC, Socinski MA, Nikiforov YE. RET rearrangements in lung adenocarcinoma and radiation. J Thorac Oncol. 2014 Jan;9(1):118-20.
- Dettmer MS, Perren A, Moch H, Komminoth P, Nikiforov YE, Nikiforova MN. MicroRNA profile of poorly differentiated thyroid carcinomas. J Mol Endocrinol. 2014, 2:181-9.
- Kelly LM, Barila G, Liu P, Evdokimova VN, Trivedi S, Panebianco F, Gandhi M, Carty SE, Hodak SP, Luo J, Dacic S, Yu YP, Nikiforova MN, Ferris RL, Altschuler DL, Nikiforov YE. Identification of the transforming STRN-ALK fusion as a potential therapeutic target in the aggressive forms of thyroid cancer. Proc Natl Acad Sci U S A. 2014; Mar; 111(11): 4233–4238.
- Yip L, Wharry LI, Armstrong MJ, Silbermann A, McCoy KL, Stang MT, Ohori NP, LeBeau SO, Coyne C, Nikiforova MN, Bauman JE, Johnson JT, Tublin ME, Hodak SP, Nikiforov YE, Carty SE. A clinical algorithm for fine-needle aspiration molecular testing effectively guides the appropriate extent of initial thyroidectomy. Ann Surg. 2014 260:163-8.
- Armstrong MJ, Yang H, Yip L, Ohori NP, McCoy KL, Stang MT, Hodak SP, Nikiforova MN, Carty SE, Nikiforov YE. PAX8/PPARγ Rearrangement in Thyroid Nodules Predicts Follicular-Pattern Carcinomas, in Particular the Encapsulated Follicular Variant of Papillary Carcinoma. Thyroid. 2014 Dec;122(12): 873:82.
- Cancer Genome Atlas Research Network (Nikiforov YE among 243 co-authors). Integrated genomic characterization of papillary thyroid carcinoma. Cell. 2014 Oct 23;159(3):676-90.
- Nikiforov YE, Carty SE, Chiosea SI, Coyne C, Duvvuri U, Ferris RL, Gooding WE, Hodak SP, LeBeau SO, Ohori NP, Seethala RR, Tublin ME, Yip L, Nikiforova MN. Highly accurate diagnosis of cancer in thyroid nodules with follicular neoplasm/suspicious for a follicular neoplasm cytology by ThyroSeq v2 next-generation sequencing assay. Cancer. 2014, 120:3627-34.
- Radkay LA, Chiosea SI, Seethala RR, Hodak SP, LeBeau SO, Yip L, McCoy KL, Carty SE, Schoedel KE, Nikiforova MN, Nikiforov YE, Ohori NP. Thyroid nodules with KRAS mutations are different from nodules with NRAS and HRAS mutations with regard to cytopathologic and histopathologic outcome characteristics. Cancer Cytopathol. 2014, 122:873-82.
- Buryk MA, Simons JP, Picarsic J, Monaco SE, Ozolek JA, Joyce J, Gurtunca N, Nikiforov YE, Feldman Witchel S. Can malignant thyroid nodules be distinguished from benign thyroid nodules in children and adolescents by clinical characteristics? A review of 89 pediatric patients with thyroid nodules. Thyroid 2015 Apr;25(4):392-400.
- Buryk MA, Picarsic J, Creary SE, Shaw PH, Simons JP, Deutsch M, Monaco SE, Nikiforov Y, Witchel S. Identification of unique heterozygous germline mutation, STK11 (p.F354L), in a child with encapsulated follicular variant of papillary thyroid carcinoma within 6 months of completing treatment for neuroblastoma. Pediatr Dev Pathol. 2015 Mar 9. [Epub ahead of print]

== Video ==
- *Noninvasive follicular thyroid neoplasms cause little risk for patients
- Dr. Nikiforov on Reclassifying Subtype of Thyroid Cancer
- Genomic Evolution of Thyroid Nodules and Cancer - ATA Award Lecture by Dr. Yuri Nikiforov
- Hot Topic 3 NIFTP Bethesda 2 World Congress on Thyroid Cancer 2017
- ThyroSeq: The Test for Thyroid Nodule
