= Denayne Dixon =

American football player (born 1984)

Denayne Davidson-Dixon is a former football player in the Arena Football League, and former police officer convicted of attempted assault and obstruction of justice. He was featured in the Serial podcast's third season as a result of his conviction.

== Football career ==
=== High school career ===
He played high school football at Shaw High School (Ohio).

=== College career ===
He played college football at Edinboro University. He played in the 2009 Cactus Bowl (Division II).

=== Minor league football ===
Davidson-Dixon was an all-star with the Erie Storm of the American Indoor Football Association.

=== Arena Football League ===
Davidson-Dixon played fullback and linebacker. He spent the 2011 season with the Iowa Barnstormers. He spent the 2012 season with the Cleveland Gladiators.

== Police Career and Criminal Charges ==
Davidson-Dixon was a former police officer in East Cleveland, Ohio. An incident occurred where he was charged with beating a suspect. In that case, Dixon and another patrol officer drove a handcuffed man, Jesse Nickerson, to a park instead of the police department, uncuffed him, and tried to engage him in a physical fight. When Jesse ran from the officers, he was apprehended and beaten. Dixon was also caught contacting Nickerson after the incident with the intent of convincing him not to testify against him in court. Within days Dixon was fired. While he did not initially face charges, he was ultimately charged, found guilty, and was sent to prison. Dixon was sentenced to two years in prison in 2017, was released after 20 months in November 2018, and was placed on three years of probation. In September 2019, Dixon was accused of punching his wife in the face, while she was calling 911 for help during an altercation, rendering her unconscious and fracturing three bones in her face. He was sentenced in early 2020 to an additional 22 months in prison which includes an extra four months for violating the terms of his probation.
