= Journal of Clinical Investigation =

- Discipline: Biomedicine
- Language: English
- Edited by: Elizabeth M. McNally

Publication details
- History: 1924-present
- Publisher: American Society for Clinical Investigation (United States)
- Frequency: Semi-monthly
- Open access: Creative Commons Attribution License (CC BY 4.0)
- Impact factor: 14.3 (2025)

Standard abbreviations
- ISO 4: J. Clin. Investig.
- NLM: J Clin Invest

Indexing
- CODEN: JCINAO
- ISSN: 0021-9738 (print); 1558-8238 (web)
- LCCN: 27010044
- OCLC no.: 01445593

Links
- Journal homepage; Online access; Online archive

The Journal of Clinical Investigation is a semi-monthly peer-reviewed medical journal covering biomedical research. It was established in 1924 and is published by the American Society for Clinical Investigation. Articles focus on the mechanisms of disease, with an emphasis on basic research, early-stage clinical studies in humans, and new research tools and techniques. The journal also publishes reviews in edited series or as stand-alone articles, commentaries on research, editorials, and feature items. The editor-in-chief is Elizabeth M. McNally (Northwestern University).

== Abstracting and indexing ==
The journal is abstracted and indexed in:

- Biological Abstracts
- BIOSIS Previews
- Chemical Abstracts Service
- Current Contents/Life Sciences
- Index Medicus/MEDLINE/PubMed
- Science Citation Index Expanded
- Scopus

According to the Journal Citation Reports, the journal has a 2025 impact factor of 14.3.

== Editors-in-chief ==
The following persons are or have been editor-in-chief of the journal:

- G. Canby Robinson (1924–1927; Vanderbilt University)
- J. Harold Austin (1928–1934; University of Pennsylvania)
- Randolph West (1935–1940; Presbyterian Hospital, New York City)
- James L. Gamble (1941–1946; Harvard University)
- Eugene B. Ferris (1947–1951; Cincinnati General Hospital)
- Stanley E. Bradley (1952–1956; Columbia University)
- Philip K. Bondy (1957–1961; Yale University)
- Arnold S. Relman (1962–1966; Harvard University)
- Paul A. Marks (1967–1970; Columbia University)
- DeWitt S. Goodman (1971–1972; Columbia University)
- Jean D. Wilson (1972–1977; University of Texas Southwestern Medical Center)
- Philip W. Majerus (1977–1981; Washington University in St. Louis)
- Stuart Kornfeld (1981–1982; Washington University)
- Thomas P. Stossel (1982–1985; Harvard University)
- Joseph Avruch (1986–1987; Harvard University)
- Bruce F. Scharschmidt (1987–1992; University of California, San Francisco)
- Ajit P. Varki (1992–1996; University of California, San Diego)
- Paul A. Insel (1996–1997; University of California, San Diego)
- Martin F. Kagnoff (1996–1997; University of California, San Diego)
- Stephen J. Weiss (1997–2002; University of Michigan)
- Andrew R. Marks (2002–2007; Columbia University)
- Laurence A. Turka (2007–2012; University of Pennsylvania)
- Howard A. Rockman (2012–2017; Duke University)
- Gordon F. Tomaselli (2017–2018; Johns Hopkins University)
- Rexford S. Ahima (2018–2022; Johns Hopkins University)
- Elizabeth M. McNally (2022–2027; Northwestern University)

== Most cited articles ==
as of October 2017, the following articles have received the most citations according to Scopus:

1. Havel, RJ; Eder, HA; Bragdon, JH (1955). "The distribution and chemical composition of ultracentrifugally separated lipoproteins in human serum". Journal of Clinical Investigation. 34 (9): 1345–1353. doi:10.1172/JCI103182. PMC 438705. PMID 13252080. (6051 citations)
2. Jaffe, Eric A.; Nachman, Ralph L.; Becker, Carl G.; Minick, C. Richard (1 November 1973). "Culture of human endothelial cells derived from umbilical veins. Identification by morphologic and immunologic criteria". Journal of Clinical Investigation. 52 (11): 2745–2756. doi:10.1172/JCI107470. PMC 302542. PMID 4355998. (5476 citations)
3. Weisberg, Stuart P.; McCann, Daniel; Desai, Manisha; Rosenbaum, Michael; Leibel, Rudolph L.; Ferrante, Anthony W. (15 December 2003). "Obesity is associated with macrophage accumulation in adipose tissue". Journal of Clinical Investigation. 112 (12): 1796–1808. doi:10.1172/JCI19246. PMC 296995. PMID 14679176. (4971 citations)
