= Sally McCormick =

New Zealand biochemistry academic

Sally Priscilla Anna McCormick
- Education: Lincoln University
- Scientific career
- Fields: Biochemistry
- Workplaces: University of Otago
- Thesis: Hypobetalipoproteinaemia and truncated forms of human apolipoprotein B (1992)

Sally Priscilla Anna McCormick is a New Zealand biochemistry academic. She is currently a full professor at the University of Otago.

== Academic career ==
After a 1992 PhD thesis titled 'Hypobetalipoproteinaemia and truncated forms of human apolipoprotein B' at Lincoln University, she moved to the University of Otago, rising to full professor in 2016.

== Selected works ==
- Murphy, Andrew J., Kevin J. Woollard, Anh Hoang, Nigora Mukhamedova, Roslynn A. Stirzaker, Sally PA McCormick, Alan T. Remaley, Dmitri Sviridov, and Jaye Chin-Dusting. "High-density lipoprotein reduces the human monocyte inflammatory response." Arteriosclerosis, thrombosis, and vascular biology 28, no. 11 (2008): 2071–2077.
- Stafforini, Diana M., Larry W. Tjoelker, Sally PA McCormick, Darius Vaitkus, Thomas M. McIntyre, Patrick W. Gray, Stephen G. Young, and Stephen M. Prescott. "Molecular basis of the interaction between plasma platelet-activating factor acetylhydrolase and low density lipoprotein." Journal of Biological Chemistry 274, no. 11 (1999): 7018–7024.
- Dichek, Helén L., Walter Brecht, Jianglin Fan, Zhong-Sheng Ji, Sally PA McCormick, Hassibullah Akeefe, LoriAnna Conzo et al. "Overexpression of hepatic lipase in transgenic mice decreases apolipoprotein B-containing and high density lipoproteins Evidence that hepatic lipase acts as a ligand for lipoprotein uptake." Journal of Biological Chemistry 273, no. 4 (1998): 1896–1903.
- McCormick, S. P., Jennifer K. Ng, Stacy Taylor, Laura M. Flynn, Robert E. Hammer, and Stephen G. Young. "Mutagenesis of the human apolipoprotein B gene in a yeast artificial chromosome reveals the site of attachment for apolipoprotein (a)." Proceedings of the National Academy of Sciences 92, no. 22 (1995): 10147–10151.
- Jones, Gregory T., Andre M. Van Rij, Jennifer Cole, Michael JA Williams, Emma H. Bateman, Santica M. Marcovina, Meiying Deng, and Sally PA McCormick. "Plasma lipoprotein (a) indicates risk for 4 distinct forms of vascular disease." Clinical chemistry 53, no. 4 (2007): 679–685.
