= Shreyas Vasanawala =

American pediatric radiologist and biomedical engineer

Academic background
- Education: BS, mathematics, 1994, California Institute of Technology; MD, PhD, biophysics, 2000, Stanford University
- Thesis: Motion artifact reduction in magnetic resonance imaging (2000)

Academic work
- Institutions: Stanford University School of Medicine

Shreyas Vasanawala is an American pediatric radiologist and biomedical engineer. In 2021, Vasanawala was appointed the Division Chief, Associate Chair, and Radiologist-in-Chief for Pediatric Radiology at the Stanford University School of Medicine. He is also the inaugural William R. Brody Professor of Pediatric Radiology and Child Health.

== Early life and education ==
Vasanawala completed his undergraduate studies in mathematics at the California Institute of Technology in 1994 before pursuing a medical degree and doctorate in biophysics at Stanford University. Following his dual medical degree and PhD, Vasanawala remained at Stanford for his internship, fellowship, and residency.

== Career ==
Following his residency in radiology and fellowship in pediatric radiology, Vasanawala joined the faculty at Stanford University. During his tenure at the institution, he aimed to speed up MRI scanning and remove the need for anesthesia in children. As such, his research team created kid-sized flexible coils that allow for speedier MRI image capturing.

From 2009 until 2017, Vasanawala was named the Tashia and John Morgridge Faculty Scholar in Pediatric Translational Medicine to support his MRI inventions. Following this, Vasanawala was elected to the American Society for Clinical Investigation and American Institute for Medical and Biological Engineering. In 2021, Vasanawala was appointed the Division Chief, Associate Chair, and Radiologist-in-Chief for Pediatric Radiology at the Stanford University School of Medicine. He was also named the inaugural William R. Brody Professor of Pediatric Radiology and Child Health.
