= Peter Tontonoz =

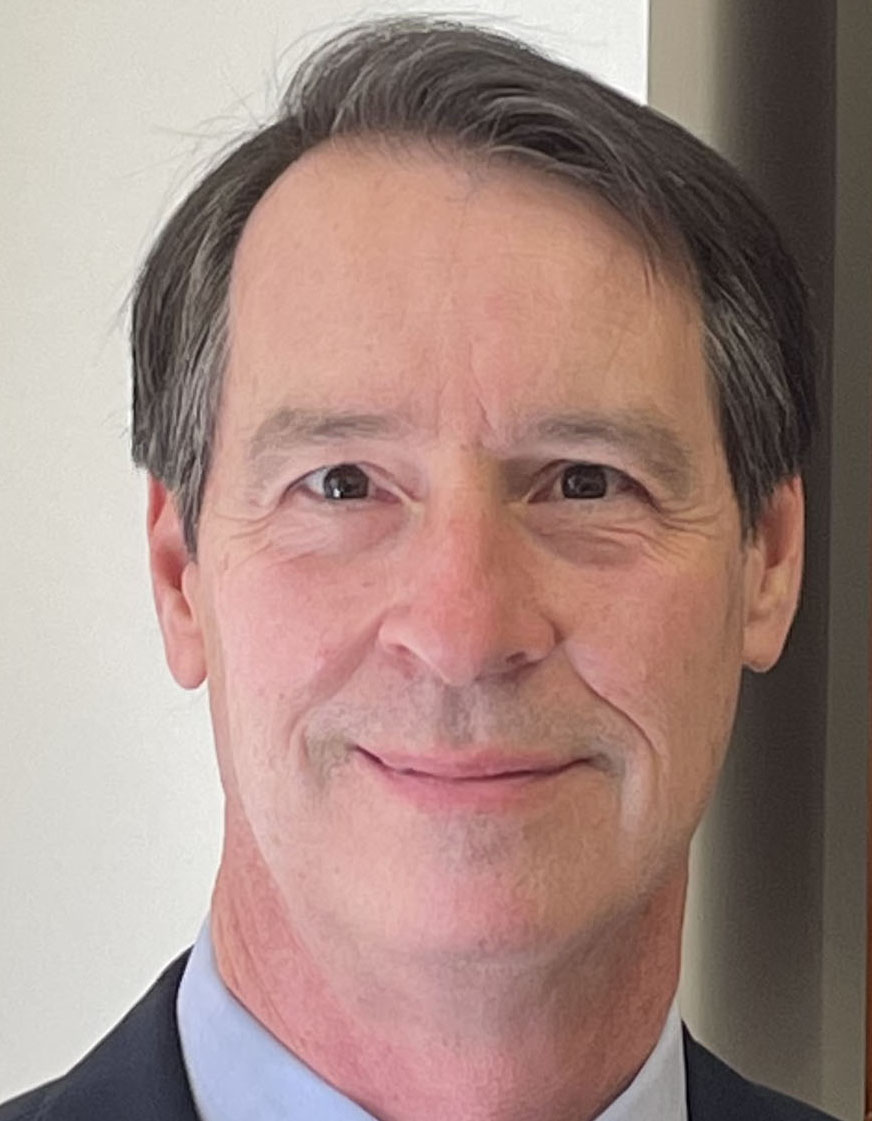
- Occupations: Physician-scientist and academic

Academic background
- Education: B.A. (1989); Ph.D. (1996); M.D. (1996)
- Alma mater: Wesleyan University; Harvard University; Harvard Medical School

Academic work
- Institutions: University of California, Los Angeles

Peter Tontonoz is a physician-scientist and academic. He is the Frances and Albert Piansky Endowed Chair and Distinguished Professor of Pathology and Laboratory Medicine and of Biological Chemistry at the University of California, Los Angeles.

Tontonoz's laboratory focuses on studying regulatory pathways involved in cholesterol, fatty acid, and phospholipid metabolism, contributing to uncovering fundamental mechanisms through which animals maintain cellular and whole-body lipid homeostasis. His group has clarified pathways governing lipid uptake, transport, and efflux, demonstrating their impact on the function of immune cells and metabolic tissues in both physiological and pathological conditions. His h-index is 121, with over 240 research articles published and cited over 68,000 times.

Tontonoz is a member of the National Academy of Sciences (NAS), the National Academy of Medicine (NAM), the American Society for Clinical Investigation (ASCI), and the Association of American Physicians (AAP). He is the recipient of national awards such as the Stanley J. Korsmeyer Award from the ASCI, the ATVB Distinguished Achievement Award and Jeffrey Hoeg Award from the American Heart Association (AHA), as well as the Richard Weitzman Award and Gerald D. Aurbach Award from The Endocrine Society.

Tontonoz served as the President of the ASCI from 2013 to 2014.

== Education and early career ==
Tontonoz earned his BA from Wesleyan University and his MD and PhD from Harvard Medical School's MSTP program. He completed his clinical pathology residency at the University of California, San Diego, and a postdoctoral fellowship at the Salk Institute for Biological Studies. During his time in Bruce M. Spiegelman's lab from 1990 to 1996, he discovered peroxisome proliferator-activated receptor gamma (PPAR)-γ as the key regulator of adipocyte differentiation. Following this, from 1996 to 1999, his postdoctoral work with Ronald M. Evans furthered his research in lipid signaling, connecting nuclear receptor pathways to macrophage biology and atherosclerosis.

== Career ==
Tontonoz joined UCLA's faculty in 1999 as an assistant professor in the Department of Pathology and Laboratory Medicine, concurrently assuming the role of Investigator at the Howard Hughes Medical Institute in 2000, where he served until 2017. He was promoted to associate professor in 2002, then to Professor in 2006, and has held the position of Distinguished Professor in the Departments of Pathology and Laboratory Medicine, as well as Biological Chemistry, since 2021. In addition, he has been holding an appointment as a Frances and Albert Piansky Chair in Anatomy at UCLA.

== Research ==
Tontonoz's work has focused on the regulation of cellular and systemic lipid metabolism. His research has defined new transcriptional pathways for lipid homeostasis, uncovered mechanisms of cholesterol movement in health and disease, and revealed connections between lipid metabolism, inflammation, and immunity.

Tontonoz's early work on lipid-activated nuclear receptors PPAR and LXR established an understanding of the transcriptional regulation of metabolic gene networks: dietary lipids like fatty acids and sterols can directly control gene expression by binding to nuclear transcription factors. His work helped in defining LXR nuclear receptors as master regulators of the macrophage cholesterol efflux pathway. His group moved on to analyze a range of LXR target genes that collaborate systematically to facilitate cellular cholesterol removal, and to demonstrate the significance of these pathways for metabolic homeostasis in vivo.

Tontonoz's work also stimulated interest in LXRs as potential targets for cardiovascular disease treatment. His team was the first to establish a connection between LXR function and the development of atherosclerosis, as well as to demonstrate that synthetic LXR ligands inhibit atherogenesis in mice. In 2003, he discovered that LXRs regulate not only cholesterol metabolism but also influence the expression of inflammatory genes. Contributing to nuclear receptor biology, his research directed the field towards exploring links between cellular lipid metabolism and immune signaling pathways. He further uncovered significant functions of cholesterol balance in both innate and acquired immune cells, illustrating the importance of LXR transcriptional networks in macrophage reactions to bacterial pathogens and the removal of apoptotic cells. Additionally, he illustrated that disturbances in LXR signaling can result in autoimmune disease development.

Tontonoz has utilized the LXR pathway as a roadmap to unveil mechanisms involved in lipid homeostasis. In 2009, he identified the E3 ubiquitin ligase IDOL a new mechanism for post-translational control of the LDLR. He proceeded to elucidate IDOL's mode of operation, its species-specific functions in systemic cholesterol metabolism, and uncovered roles for lipoprotein receptors in Alzheimer's disease and cognitive functions such as learning and memory. In addition, he has also offered insight into LXR-dependent mechanisms that merge sterol and phospholipid metabolism, ensuring membrane homeostasis. He demonstrated LXRs' key role in shaping the acyl chain composition of biological membranes by regulating the phospholipid-remodeling enzyme Lpcat3, and showed that Lpcat3's ability to regulate membrane dynamics is vital for fundamental biological processes, such as the secretion of triglyceride-rich lipoproteins from the liver, absorption of dietary lipids, and proliferation of intestinal stem cells.

In 2018, Tontonoz addressed the issue of cholesterol transport between the plasma membrane and the ER by discovering a family of three previously unidentified proteins, which he named Asters, serving as innovative intracellular sterol carriers. He defined Asters as ER-resident proteins that form plasma membrane-ER contacts in response to elevated cholesterol levels in the plasma membrane, and demonstrated the critical role of Aster-B in transporting HDL-derived cholesterol from SR-BI to the ER in the adrenal cortex and liver, thus highlighting its essential function in vivo. He further showed that Asters facilitate dietary cholesterol absorption in the intestine by acting downstream of NPC1-L1.

More recently in 2023, Tontonoz identified CLSTN3β as a novel ER-lipid droplet contact protein that governs lipid utilization in adipocytes. He showed that the distinctive role of this protein in inhibiting lipid droplet coalescence resolves the question of why brown fat cells harbor numerous small lipid droplets while white fat cells possess a single large one.

== Awards and honors ==
- 2005 – Richard E. Weitzman Award, The Endocrine Society
- 2010 – Jeffrey M. Hoeg Award for Basic and Clinical Research, AHA
- 2014 – Gerald D. Aurbach Award, The Endocrine Society
- 2014 – Elected Member, AAP
- 2017 – Richard Havel Award Lecture, American Society for Biochemistry and Molecular Biology
- 2020 – Elected Member, NAS (USA)
- 2021 – Elected Member, NAM (USA)
- 2022 – Korsmeyer Award, ASCI
- 2023 – ATVB Distinguished Achievement Award, AHA

== Selected articles ==
- Tontonoz, P., Hu, E., & Spiegelman, B. M. (1994). Stimulation of adipogenesis in fibroblasts by PPARγ2, a lipid-activated transcription factor. Cell, 79(7), 1147–1156.
- Tontonoz, P., Hu, E., Graves, R. A., Budavari, A. I., & Spiegelman, B. M. (1994). mPPAR gamma 2: tissue-specific regulator of an adipocyte enhancer. Genes & development, 8(10), 1224–1234.
- Forman, B. M., Tontonoz, P., Chen, J., Brun, R. P., Spiegelman, B. M., & Evans, R. M. (1995). 15-deoxy-Δ12, 14-prostaglandin J2 is a ligand for the adipocyte determination factor PPARγ. Cell, 83(5), 803–812.
- Tontonoz, P., Nagy, L., Alvarez, J. G., Thomazy, V. A., & Evans, R. M. (1998). PPARγ promotes monocyte/macrophage differentiation and uptake of oxidized LDL. Cell, 93(2), 241–252.
- Joseph, S. B., Castrillo, A., Laffitte, B. A., Mangelsdorf, D. J., & Tontonoz, P. (2003). Reciprocal regulation of inflammation and lipid metabolism by liver X receptors. Nature medicine, 9(2), 213–219.
- Joseph, S. B., Bradley, M. N., Castrillo, A., Bruhn, K. W., Mak, P. A., Pei, L., ... & Tontonoz, P. (2004). LXR-dependent gene expression is important for macrophage survival and the innate immune response. Cell, 119(2), 299–309.
- Tontonoz, P., & Spiegelman, B. M. (2008). Fat and beyond: the diverse biology of PPARγ. Annu. Rev. Biochem., 77, 289–312.
- Zelcer, N., Hong, C., Boyadjian, R., & Tontonoz, P. (2009). LXR regulates cholesterol uptake through Idol-dependent ubiquitination of the LDL receptor. Science, 325(5936), 100–104.
- Sandhu, J., Li, S., Fairall, L., Pfisterer, S. G., Gurnett, J. E., Xiao, X., ... & Tontonoz, P. (2018). Aster proteins facilitate nonvesicular plasma membrane to ER cholesterol transport in mammalian cells. Cell, 175(2), 514–529.
- Ferrari, A., Whang, E., Xiao, X., Kennelly, J. P., Romartinez-Alonso, B., Mack, J. J., ... & Tontonoz, P. (2023). Aster-dependent nonvesicular transport facilitates dietary cholesterol uptake. Science, 382(6671), eadf0966.
- Qian, K., Tol, M. J., Wu, J., Uchiyama, L. F., Xiao, X., Cui, L., Bedard, A. H., Weston, T. A., Rajendran, P. S., Vergnes, L., Shimanaka, Y., Yin, Y., Jami-Alahmadi, Y., Cohn, W., Bajar, B. T., Lin, C. H., Jin, B., DeNardo, L. A., Black, D. L., Whitelegge, J. P., ... Tontonoz, P. (2023). CLSTN3β enforces adipocyte multilocularity to facilitate lipid utilization. Nature, 613(7942), 160–168.
