= Molecular and Cellular Biology =

- Discipline: Molecular and cellular biology
- Language: English
- Edited by: Peter Tontonoz

Publication details
- History: 1981–present
- Publisher: Taylor & Francis (United States)
- Frequency: Biweekly
- Impact factor: 5.3 (2022)

Standard abbreviations
- ISO 4: Mol. Cell. Biol.

Indexing
- ISSN: 0270-7306 (print); 1098-5549 (web)
- LCCN: 81642224
- OCLC no.: 6492263

Links
- Journal homepage; Online access; Online archives

Molecular and Cellular Biology is a biweekly peer-reviewed scientific journal covering all aspects of molecular and cellular biology. It is published by the American Society for Microbiology and the editor-in-chief is Peter Tontonoz (University of California, Los Angeles). It was established in 1981. The h-index (1981-2021) is 338.

== Abstracting and indexing ==
The journal is abstracted and indexed in:

- AGRICOLA
- BIOSIS Previews
- Current Contents/Life Sciences
- Embase
- Index Medicus/MEDLINE/PubMed
- Science Citation Index
- Scopus

According to the Journal Citation Reports, the journal has a 2021 impact factor of 5.069.
