= Clare Grundman =

American composer and arranger

Clare (Ewing) Grundman (May 11, 1913 in Cleveland, Ohio – June 15, 1996 in South Salem, New York) was an American composer and arranger.

== Biography ==
He was born in Cleveland and graduated from Shaw High School in East Cleveland in 1930. He then attended Ohio State University, where he received a B.Sc degree in education in 1934. For a few years, he taught instrumental music in Ohio and Kentucky public schools, but returned to Ohio State in 1937, where he taught orchestration, applied lessons in woodwind instruments, and conducted the band. He received his MA degree in 1940.

After finishing his degree he moved to New York. He then studied composition with Paul Hindemith at the Berkshire Music Center, and served as a military musician in the United States Coast Guard from 1942 to 1945.

Among his many awards were an Honorary Membership in the Women Band Directors International (1974), the AWAPA award of the National Band Association (1982), the American Bandmasters Association's Edwin Franko Goldman Memorial Citation (1983), the Sudler Order of Merit of the John Philip Sousa Foundation (1990), and the American School Band Directors Association's Goldman Award (1992).

In addition to his musical accomplishments he co-authored The New York Times' 1974 Crossword Puzzle Dictionary.

Grundman was gay and in a long-term relationship. After his death in 1996, Grundman's partner survived him for another sixteen years. His papers and manuscripts are located in the Music and Dance Library at Ohio State.

== Music ==
Grundman composed scores for films, radio, and television, as well as orchestrations for Broadway musicals. He also wrote a few works for various chamber ensembles and for full orchestra. However, he is best known for his many compositions and arrangements for symphonic band.

Many of his band pieces are rhapsodies or fantasies on folk tunes from various countries. They are often played by American high school bands, especially An Irish Rhapsody, but he also used melodies from England, Finland, Japan, Norway, and Scotland.

His primary publisher is Boosey & Hawkes.

== Writings ==
- The New York Times Crossword Puzzle Dictionary, Third Edition, with Tom Pulliam (1974)

== Musical works ==
Chamber music

- Bagatelle (Bagatelles) (for four clarinets)
- Caprice for Clarinets (for four clarinets or clarinet choir)
- Concertante (for alto saxophone and piano; originally for alto saxophone and band)
- Conversation for Cornet (for cornet and piano)
- Flutation (for flute trio or flute choir)
- Puppets (for two clarinets)
- Pat-a-Pan (Christmas carol for two flutes and snare drum)
- Scherzo (for six clarinets)
- Three Medieval Sketches (Joust, Chapel, and Pagent) (for two horns in F)
- Tuba Rhapsody (for tuba and piano, arrangement of work for tuba and band)
- Waltz and Interlude (for clarinet, flute and piano)
- Works for unaccompanied bassoon, English horn, and flute
- Zoo Illogical Voice (for winds, percussion, and piano)

Works for concert or symphonic band

- American Folk Rhapsody No. 1
- American Folk Rhapsody No. 2
- American Folk Rhapsody No. 3
- American Folk Rhapsody No. 4
- An American Scene
- Black Knight
- The Blue And The Gray (Civil War Suite), 1961
- Burlesque
- Chessboard Suite (Note: Commissioned for the 1964 Phi Mu Alpha National Convention.)
- Classical Overture
- Concertante for Alto Sax and Band, 1973
- Colonial Legend
- Concord, 1987
- A Copland Tribute
- Cowboy in Cuba
- Dance and Interlude
- English Christmas
- English Suite
- Fantasy on American Sailing Songs
- Fantasy on English Hunting Songs
- Festive Piece
- Finnish Rhapsody
- Green Domino
- Hebrides Suite (based on Airs from "Songs of the Hebrides", collected by Marjory Kennedy-Fraser
1. The Peat-Fire Flame
2. An Eriskay Love Lilt
3. Milking Song (Hebridean Game Song)
4. The Road to the Isles
- Holiday
- An Irish Rhapsody
- Kentucky 1800
- Little English Suite
1. The Leather Bottle
2. Roving
3. We Met
4. The Vicar of Bray
- Little March
- Little Suite for Band
- Music for a Carnival
- Nocturne (solo harp and wind ensemble)
- Normandy
- Northwest Saga
- Norwegian Rhapsody
- Overture on a Short Theme
- Quiet Christmas
- A Scottish Rhapsody
- Songs for Christmas
- Spirit of '76
- Three Carols for Christmas
- Three Sketches for Winds
- Trumpets Triumphant
- Tuba Rhapsody (solo tuba and band)
- Two Irish Songs
- Two Moods Overture, 1947
- A Welsh Rhapsody
- A Westchester Overture
- Western Dance

Arrangements for band

- Candide Suite (by Leonard Bernstein)
- A Copland Portrait (works by Aaron Copland)
- Divertimento (by Leonard Bernstein)
- A Somerset Rhapsody, Op. 21b (by Gustav Holst)
- Overture to Candide (by Leonard Bernstein)
- Slava! (by Leonard Bernstein)

Orchestrations for musicals

- Drat! The Cat!, 1965
- Show Girl, additional orchestrations for the 1961 revival
- Joyce Grenfell Requests the Pleasure, 1955
- Phoenix ’55, 1955
- Two’s Company, 1952-53
- Lend an Ear, 1948-50

== Sources ==
- Camus, Raoul F., "Grundman, Clare (Ewing)", Grove Online
- Gbur, Bruce (December 2013), "Historian's Spotlight: Two Sinfonian Composers Celebrate Centennial in 2013", The Sinfonian, LXII Issue I: 12–13
