= Elizabeth M. McNally =

American human geneticist and cardiologist

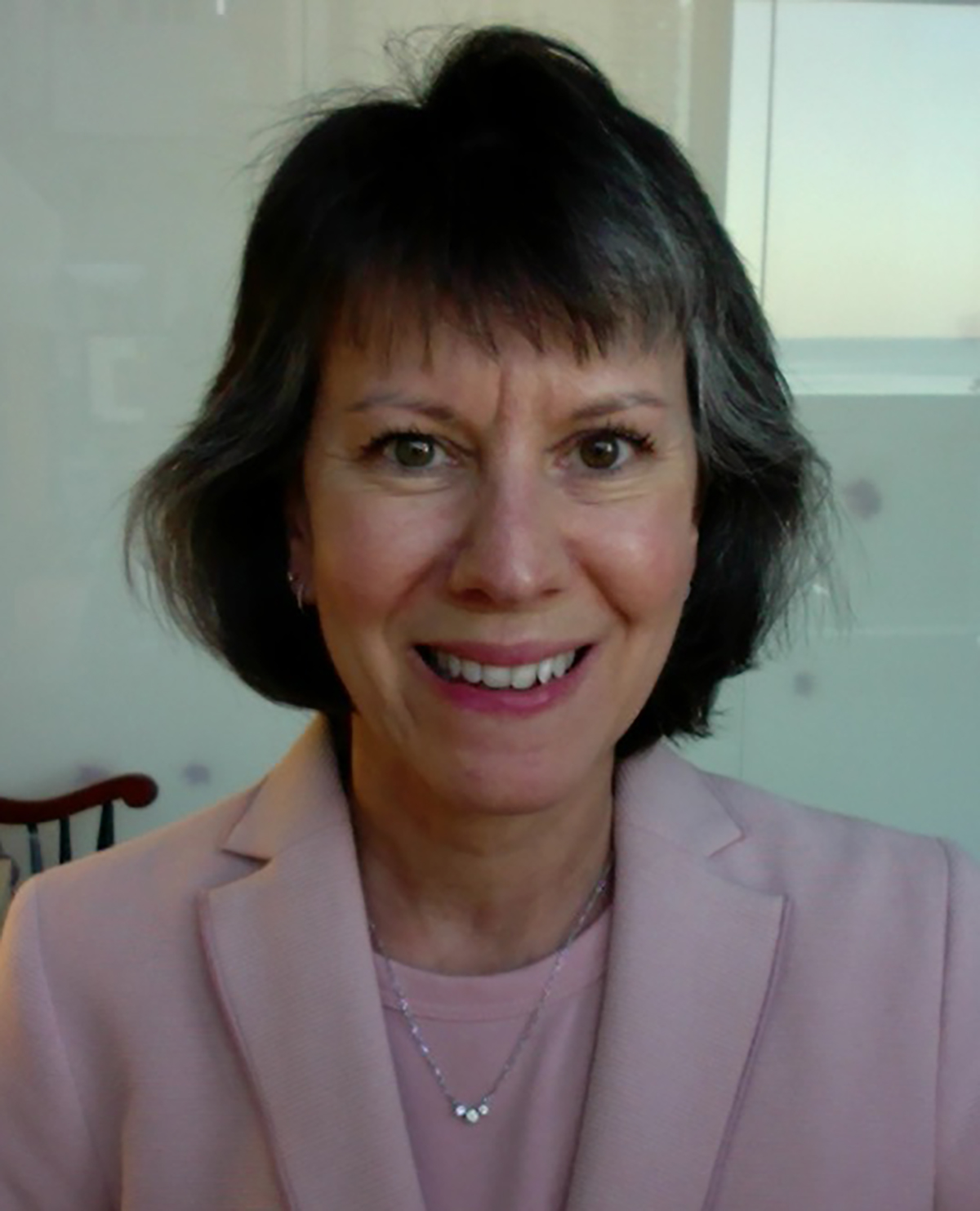
- Born: Chicago, Illinois, US
- Spouse: Steve Kron

Academic background
- Education: B.A., 1983, Barnard College; MD, PhD, 1990, Albert Einstein College of Medicine

Academic work
- Institutions: Feinberg School of Medicine; University of Chicago

Elizabeth M. McNally is an American human geneticist and cardiologist. She is the Elizabeth J. Ward Chair and director of the Center for Genetic Medicine at Northwestern University's Feinberg School of Medicine.

In 2021, McNally was elected a member of the National Academy of Medicine "for discovering genetic variants responsible for multiple distinct inherited cardiac and skeletal myopathic disorders and pioneering techniques for mapping modifiers of single gene disorders by integrating genomic and transcriptomic data to define the pathways that mediate disease risk and progression."

== Early life and education ==
McNally was born and raised in Chicago, Illinois. Growing up, she became inspired to pursue a career in science in part due to the Museum of Science and Industry in Chicago. She completed her undergraduate degree in biology and philosophy from Barnard College before pursuing her medical degree and PhD from the Albert Einstein College of Medicine. McNally then trained in internal medicine and cardiovascular medicine at the Brigham and Women’s Hospital and completed her postdoctoral training in genetics at Boston Children's Hospital/Howard Hughes Medical Institute.

== Career ==
Following her postdoctoral training, McNally joined the faculty at the University of Chicago (UChicago) as an assistant professor in 1996. While working in this role, she was named one of four recipients of the Charles E. Culpeper Foundation Scholarships in Medical Science for 1998 to study the inherited nature of human disease. McNally was eventually promoted to the rank of associate professor in medicine and human genetics in 2003 and elected to the American Society for Clinical Investigation. During her lengthy tenure at UChicago, McNally's research into genetic modifiers of myopathies resulted in the detection of several new protective pathways.

=== Northwestern University ===
In 2014, McNally was recruited to become the Elizabeth J. Ward Chair and director of the Center for Genetic Medicine at Northwestern University's Feinberg School of Medicine. While serving in this role, she was elected into the National Academy of Inventors and American Academy of Arts and Sciences. She has served as president of the American Society for Clinical Investigation and the Association of American Physicians.

At the start of the COVID-19 pandemic, McNally collaborated with Feinberg investigators to develop an at-home COVID-19 antibody test that can determine prior exposure to the SAR-CoV-2 virus. In 2021, McNally was elected a member of the National Academy of Medicine "for discovering genetic variants responsible for multiple distinct inherited cardiac and skeletal myopathic disorders and pioneering techniques for mapping modifiers of single gene disorders by integrating genomic and transcriptomic data to define the pathways that mediate disease risk and progression."

== Personal life ==
McNally is married to Steve Kron, a professor of molecular genetics and cell biology.
