= Burt E. Skeel =

American pilot (1894–1924)

Burt Eugene Skeel
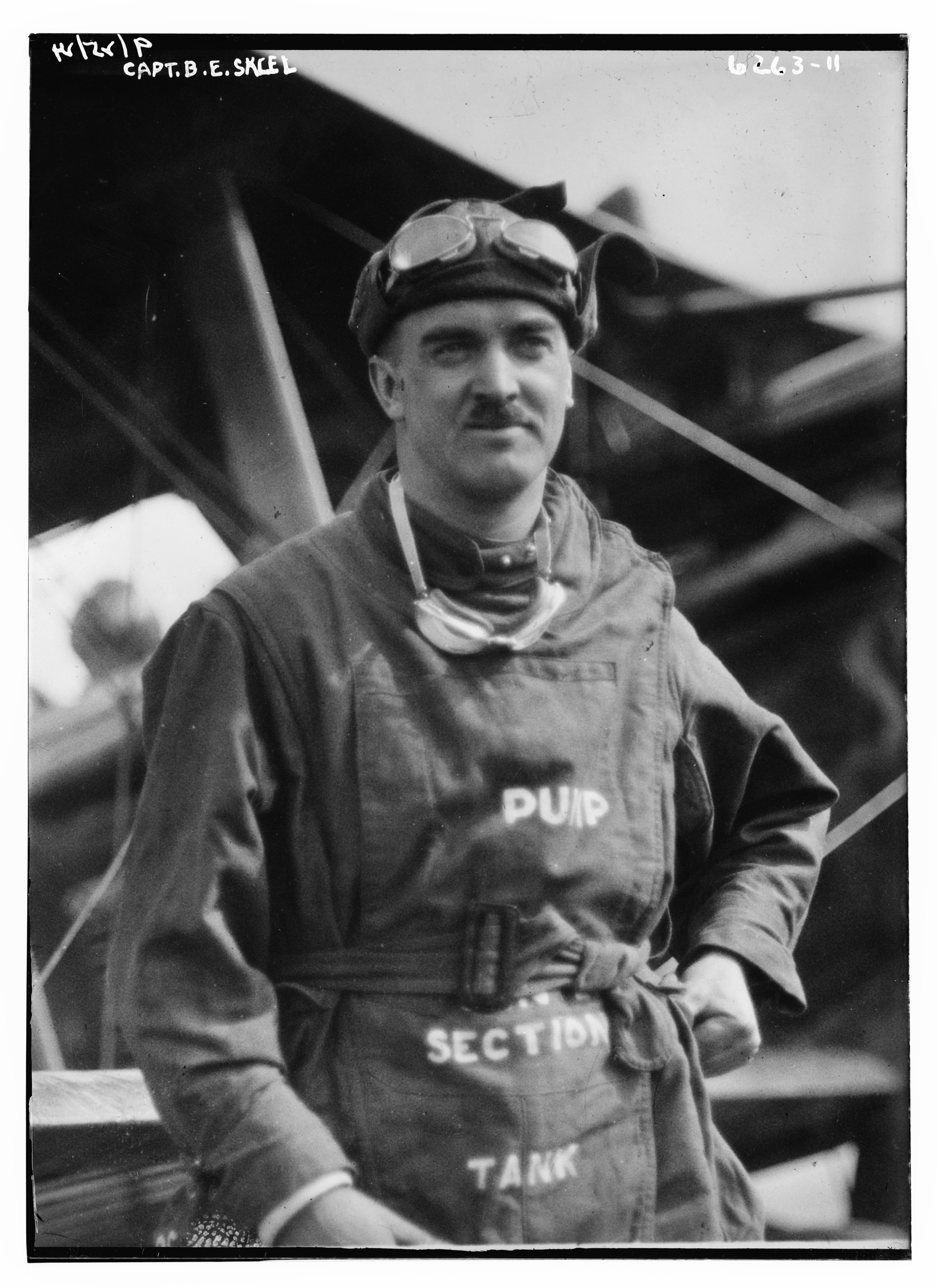
- Skeel on September 25, 1924
- Born: May 5, 1894; East Cleveland, Ohio
- Died: October 4, 1924 (aged 30); Dayton, Ohio
- Cause of death: airplane crash
- Awards: Mitchell Trophy Race

Burt Eugene Skeel (May 5, 1894 – October 4, 1924) was a United States Army Air Service and civilian pilot.

== Biography ==
He was born on May 5, 1894, in East Cleveland, Ohio, to Frank E. and Artemisia Edgerton Skeel.

Skeel commanded the 27th Pursuit Squadron of the First Pursuit Group at Selfridge Field in Mount Clemens, Michigan.

On October 6, 1923, Skeel won the second running of the Mitchell Trophy Race in St. Louis, Missouri, with his MB-3A reaching a speed of 161 mph (258 km/h).

Skeel had boasted that he intended to win the Pulitzer Trophy Race at Wilbur Wright Field. Instead, he was killed on October 4, 1924, when the wings of his Curtiss broke away from the fuselage when he was still at 2,000 feet (615 m), and he went into a dive at about 275 mph (440 km/h).

Camp Skeel in Oscoda, Michigan was named in his memory.
