= Emmanuel Onunwor =

Mayor of East Cleveland, Ohio
- In office January 1, 1998 – September 1, 2004
- Preceded by: Wallace D. Davis
- Succeeded by: Saratha Goggins

Personal details
- Born: May 24, 1952 (age 74) Port Harcourt, British Nigeria
- Spouse: Diane Onunwor
- Education: B.A. and M.A. Cleveland State University

Emmanuel Onunwor (born May 24, 1952, as Emmanuel Onunwa) is a Nigeria-born American who served as the mayor of East Cleveland, Ohio.

== Biography ==
Onunwor was born in Port Harcourt, Rivers State, Nigeria where he attended primary and secondary schools. In 1980, he immigrated to the United States where he earned a B.A. and M.A. in urban studies at Cleveland State University.

In the November 1997 general election, running as a non-partisan, he defeated incumbent mayor Wallace D. Davis with 62.56% of the vote. He was sworn in on January 1, 1998 becoming the first African-born Black mayor in the United States. In the November 2001 general election, running as a Republican, he was re-elected with 71.19% of the vote defeating Democrat Eric J. Brewer (who would later win election as mayor in 2005). After being convicted for racketeering, extortion, mail fraud, and tax evasion, he resigned on September 1, 2004. He was succeeded by the East Cleveland City Council President, Democrat Saratha Goggins, the first female mayor of East Cleveland.

In September 2005, he was sentenced by U.S. District Court judge James S. Gwin to nine years in prison. At sentencing, Onunwor stated: "I apologize to my family, my friends and the citizens...I did wrong. I deserve to be punished.

== Personal life ==
In 2009, his son, Clifton Onunwor, was sentenced to life in prison for killing his mother, Diane Onunwor.

Political offices
Preceded by Wallace D. Davis	Mayor of East Cleveland, Ohio; 1998–2004	Succeeded by Saratha Goggins
