= Nicole Calakos =

Neurobiology researcher

- Born: Boca Raton, Florida, USA
- Spouse(s): Russell C. Mead, Jr

Academic background
- Education: BSc, University of California, Berkeley; PhD, MD, Stanford University
- Thesis: Protein interactions within the presynaptic nerve terminal: implications for synaptic vesicle docking and fusion (1995)

Academic work
- Institutions: Duke University
- Main interests: Obsessive–compulsive disorder

Nicole Calakos is an American neuroscientist and neurologist. She is the Lincoln Financial Group Distinguished Professor of Neurobiology at Duke University. She is an elected Member of the American Association for the Advancement of Science, American Society for Clinical Investigation, and National Academy of Medicine for her "pioneering work in optogenetic approaches, and substantial contributions in the area of synaptic plasticity with a focus on striatal circuity of the basal ganglia."

== Early life and education ==
Calakos was born in Boca Raton, Florida to parents Nick and Marien. While in high school, she was encouraged by her biology teacher to attend a University of Florida summer science program. This inspired her to pursue a career in science, specifically scientific medical research. At the age of 16, she was a senior in Boca Raton Community High School and was a semi-finalist in the 1984 National Merit Scholarship competition. Following high school, Calakos enrolled at the University of California, Berkeley before earning her PhD and medical degree at Stanford University. She then completed her internship and residency at the UCSF School of Medicine.

== Career ==
After completing her postdoctoral training at Stanford with Rob Malenka, Calakos became an assistant professor at Duke University in 2005. In this role, she was a member of a research team that developed a new mouse model of Obsessive–compulsive disorder (OCD) by deleting a gene that codes for Sapap3. Her laboratory at Duke became focused on understanding the role of mGluRs in people with OCD through the use of mice. In 2009, Calakos became intrigued in patients with non-familial dystonia and variations of the genes. Her research team found that the DYT1 mutation contributed to childhood-onset dystonia as it was stuck near the cell's nucleus. Calakos's research efforts earned her a Research Incubator Award for 2008–2009 from the Duke Institute for Brain Sciences. She also received one of four 2014 McKnight Memory and Cognitive Disorder Awards from the McKnight Endowment Fund for Neuroscience. In 2015, Calakos became an Harrington Scholar-Innovator to support her project "Novel Targeting of the ER Stress Response Pathway to Treat Movement Disorders of the Nervous System."

Following her promotion to associate professor, Calakos built on her early OCD study and found that overactivity of a single type of receptor for neurotransmitters was the major driver for the abnormal behaviors. This subsequently led to the development of a new cell-based screening test to identify new drug candidates to treat dystonia. Her research contributions were recognised international with an election to the American Society for Clinical Investigation. She was also recognized locally by being named an inaugural Duke Health Scholar. In 2018, Calakos became the clinical principal investigator to study the role of astrocytes in the development of Parkinson's disease. The aim of the project was to identify how genes associated with Parkinson's are expressed by astrocytes.

In 2020, Calakos was appointed the Lincoln Financial Group Distinguished Professor of Neurobiology. She was also elected a Fellow of the American Association for the Advancement of Science for "pioneering work in optogenetic approaches, and substantial contributions in the area of synaptic plasticity with a focus on striatal circuity of the basal ganglia." Two years later, she was also named a National Academy of Medicine for her role as a clinician, scientist, and mentor in the field of movement disorders.

== Personal life ==
Calakos is married to Russell C. Mead, Jr.
