= Saratha Goggins =

American politician

Mayor of East Cleveland, Ohio
- In office September 1, 2004 – January 1, 2006
- Preceded by: Emmanuel Onunwor
- Succeeded by: Eric J. Brewer

Personal details
- Born: 1950 or 1951 (age 75–76)
- Party: Democratic

Saratha A. Goggins (born 1950/51) is an American politician who served as the first woman mayor of East Cleveland, Ohio.

== Biography ==
Goggins served on the East Cleveland City Council for a very long time and eventually became its president. On September 1, 2004, she was sworn in as mayor of East Cleveland after the resignation of her predecessor who was convicted of racketeering, extortion, mail fraud, and tax evasion, making her the first female and 4th African-American mayor of East Cleveland.

In the October 2005 primary election, running as a Democrat, she was defeated by Eric J. Brewer who earned 54.90% of the vote to her 29.96% after news broke that she had been convicted in May 1983 of voluntary manslaughter in the stabbing to death her boyfriend on September 30, 1982. She stated that the stabbing was in self-defense.

== See also ==
- List of first African-American mayors

Political offices
Preceded by Emmanuel Onunwor	Mayor of East Cleveland, Ohio; 2004–2006	Succeeded by Eric J. Brewer
