= East Cleveland City School District =

School district in Ohio, United States

Address
- 1843 Stanwood Road East Cleveland, Ohio, 44112; United States
- Coordinates: 41.535541°N 81.574476°W

District information
- Motto: The Model Urban School System
- Grades: Pre-kindergarten – 12
- Superintendent: Henry Pettiegrew
- Accreditation: Ohio Department of Education
- Budget: 54.206 Million
- NCES District ID: 3904390

Students and staff
- Enrollment: 1,205 (2023–24)
- Faculty: 107.07 (FTE)
- Staff: 234.60 (FTE)
- Student–teacher ratio: 11.25

Other information
- Telephone: (216) 268-6600
- Fax: (216) 294-2102
- Website: east-cleveland.k12.oh.us

The East Cleveland City School District is a public school district headquartered in East Cleveland, Ohio, United States. It serves East Cleveland and a section of Cleveland Heights.

== Finances ==
The district was known for mismanagement of finances; around 2000 the Federal Bureau of Investigation and the Internal Revenue Service had suspicions that criminal activity had occurred in the district.

The district was placed in fiscal emergency and had a Fiscal Oversight Commission, but this designation was removed several years ago.

== Dress code ==
All students in the district are required to wear school uniforms.

== Schools ==
=== Secondary schools ===
- Shaw High School (East Cleveland)

Shaw High Schools Marching Cardinals Band has won numerous awards and has travelled to China. Career/Tech education is a major strength. Shaw High School offers Advanced Placement Environmental Science and other AP courses.

- Heritage Middle School (East Cleveland)(Former Kirk Junior High School)

=== Primary schools ===
- Caledonia Elementary School (Cleveland Heights)
- Mayfair Elementary School (East Cleveland)
- Prospect Academy (East Cleveland) (Pre-K)
- Superior Elementary School (East Cleveland)

All elementary schools and Heritage Middle Schools have new STEM labs as of the 2014-2015 school year. All school have band instruction. In the elementary schools, this starts at the 5th grade. Chambers Elementary School has a Gifted & Talented program, offers both Spanish and Chinese instruction, and has a Suzuki Violin program. Both Superior Elementary and Chambers Elementary have gardens.

=== Former schools ===
- Rozelle Elementary School (East Cleveland)
