= Stanley J. Korsmeyer =

American oncologist (1950–2005)

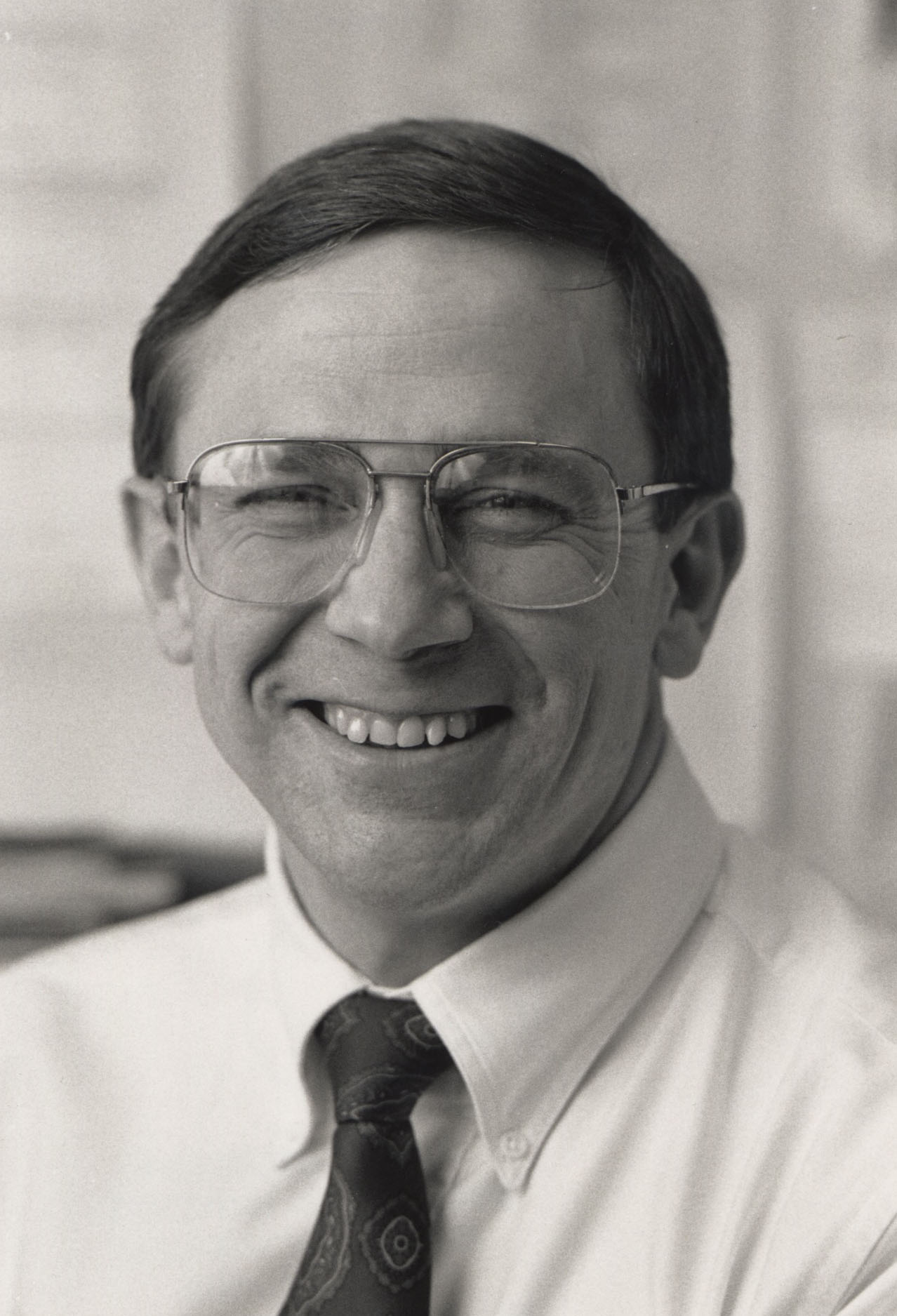
- Korsmeyer in 1992
- Born: June 8, 1950; Beardstown, Illinois, U.S.
- Died: March 31, 2005 (aged 54); Boston, Massachusetts, U.S.
- Education: University of Illinois Urbana-Champaign; University of Illinois College of Medicine
- Known for: Co-discovering Bcl-2; Studying role of apoptosis in cancer development
- Spouse: Susan Reynard
- Children: 2
- Awards: Louisa Gross Horwitz Prize (2000); Wiley Prize (2002); Bristol-Myers Squibb Award; Charles S. Mott Prize
- Scientific career
- Fields: Cell biology; oncology
- Workplaces: National Cancer Institute; Washington University; Dana–Farber Cancer Institute

Stanley Joel Korsmeyer (June 8, 1950 – March 31, 2005) was an American research scientist known for his work on B cell lymphomas and apoptosis. Born and educated in the US state of Illinois, Korsmeyer spent most of his career as a professor at Washington University School of Medicine and later the Dana–Farber Cancer Institute. He rose to prominence in the early 1980s as a research fellow at the National Cancer Institute. There he co-discovered the genetic cause of most cases of the cancer follicular lymphoma – the misregulation of the gene Bcl-2. Korsmeyer went on to start his own laboratory at Washington University in St. Louis, further studying the role of Bcl-2 in cell biology. His group's work expanded the paradigm of cancer-causing genes, providing the first example of how interfering with programmed cell death could lead to cancer development. Korsmeyer authored over 250 scientific papers over the course of his career. He was elected to the U.S. National Academy of Sciences at the age of 45. Korsmeyer died of lung cancer in 2005, at the age of 54.

== Early life and education ==
Stanley Joel Korsmeyer was born in Beardstown, Illinois, on June 8, 1950, to Willard and Carnell Korsmeyer. His parents were longtime hog farmers – Willard Korsmeyer inherited the farm started by his great-great grandparents, and Carnell Korsmeyer was a past president of the National Pork Board. From an early age, Stanley Korsmeyer – who preferred "Stan" – showed an interest in veterinary medicine. He was heavily involved in his local 4-H club, and at 14 a pair of Hampshire hogs he raised were named Illinois State Fair grand champions, making him the youngest person in the fair's history to receive that honor. At some point an early mentor, local veterinarian Robert Goodin, advised him instead to consider a career in biology.

Korsmeyer studied biology as an undergraduate at the University of Illinois Urbana-Champaign, completing his BS in 1972. He then moved on to medical school at the University of Illinois College of Medicine in Chicago. Here Korsmeyer's talent was recognized by the hematology division chief Paul Heller, who encouraged Korsmeyer to pursue a research career. Heller arranged for Korsmeyer's first research experience, with Robert Strickland at the University of New Mexico which resulted in Korsmeyer's first scientific publication, a 1975 paper in PNAS. Korsmeyer completed his MD in 1976, then moved to the University of California, San Francisco for his intern and residency. In 1979, he moved to the U.S. National Institutes of Health as a research fellow under Thomas A. Waldmann. Collaborating with Philip Leder's group, Korsmeyer defined the chromosomal translocation that underlay most follicular lymphoma, naming the affected gene Bcl-2.

== Academic career ==
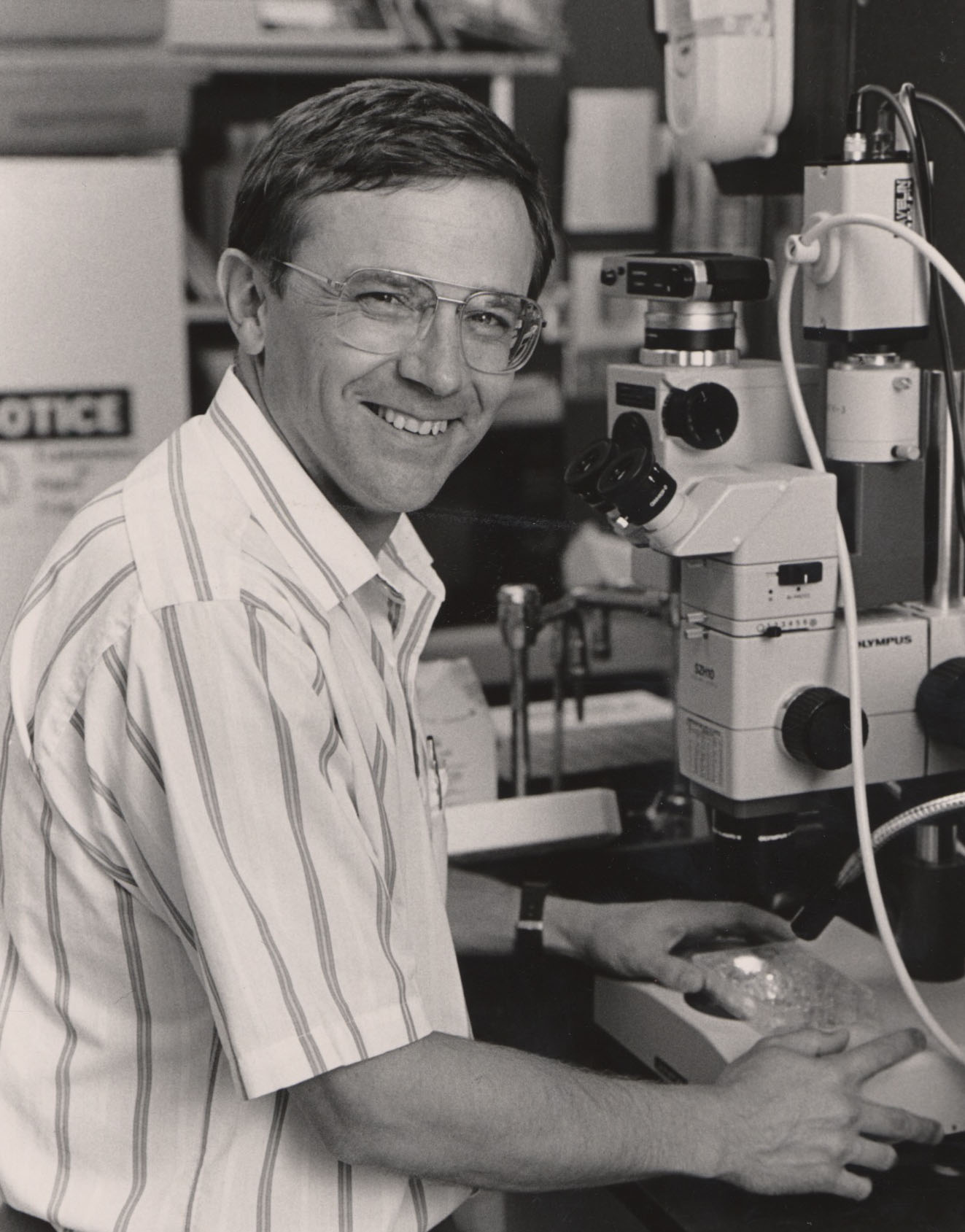
Korsmeyer in his lab at Washington University

In 1982, Korsmeyer was promoted to senior investigator at the National Cancer Institute. A few years later in 1986, he moved his laboratory to Washington University School of Medicine's Department of Medicine, eventually becoming professor of medicine, director of the Division of Medical Oncology, and a Howard Hughes Investigator. There his group continued to work on B-cell lymphomas, showing that mice overexpressing Bcl-2 in their B cells developed long-lived B cells that would accumulate other mutations, leading eventually to cancer. This was the first example establishing dysregulated cell death as a path to oncogenesis, rather than just dysregulated cell proliferation. Korsmeyer's group went on to define the role of Bcl-2 in normal B- and T-cell physiology, and showed that many types of cells require Bcl-2 for their normal development. In 1990, Korsmeyer's group found that Bcl-2 typically resides in mitochondria, sparking further research into how mitochondrial proteins regulate cell death. They went on to define the mechanism by which mitochondria influence apoptosis – via Bcl-2 and a family of related proteins including BID, BAD, and BAX. Korsmeyer synthesized this work into a "rheostat model" of cell death regulation, whereby cell death is governed by the balance of pro- and anti-cell death proteins. Demonstrating this theory, his group showed that cancer cells can be killed either by blocking the anti-death protein Bcl-2, or by activating the pro-death protein BAX.

In 1998, Korsmeyer was recruited to Harvard Medical School to serve as the Sydney Farber Professor of Pathology and Medicine as well as Director of the Dana–Farber Cancer Institute's Program in Molecular Oncology. There his group continued their research into mitochondrial regulators of apoptosis, defining the mechanism by which Bcl-2 and the related Bcl-xL sequester pro-death regulators. Without Bcl-2 suppression, BID and other pro-death regulators oligomerize BAX and BAK, initiating the cell death pathway. This work on apoptosis regulators also revealed roles for these proteins outside of apoptosis. Korsmeyer's group described a role for BAX and BAK maintaining calcium levels in the cell's endoplasmic reticulum, for BAD in regulating glycolysis via glucokinase, and for another anti-apoptotic protein MCL1 in blood cell development.

Over his career in science, Korsmeyer published over 250 scientific papers, 23 of which had been cited over 500 times at the time of his death. Forty of his postdoctoral fellows went on to hold faculty positions of their own. Korsmeyer was elected to the National Academy of Sciences at the age of 45, as well as to the National Institute of Medicine, American Academy of Arts and Sciences, and the American Philosophical Society. Korsmeyer received many awards for his research, including a Louisa Gross Horwitz Prize(Columbia University),Bristol-Myers Squibb Award, the Charles S. Mott Prize, the Pezcoller Foundation-American Association for Cancer Research International Prize, and the American Society of Hematology's Stratton Medal. He received the first American Society for Clinical Investigation ASCI Award, renamed the Stanley J. Korsmeyer Award in his honor in 2006. That same year Washington University School of Medicine established the annual Stanley J. Korsmeyer Memorial Lecture, which brings a renowned cell biologist to the school to speak each year.

In remembrance of Korsmeyer, colleague Robert Horvitz said, "He was everybody's hero—as a scientist and as a human being. His contributions were truly major and pioneering, and they revolutionized the field."

== Personal life ==
During his residency in San Francisco, Korsmeyer met and married oncology nurse Susan Reynard. They had two sons together. He was an avid sailor and fisherman throughout his life. Korsmeyer was diagnosed with lung cancer in early 2004. Despite his illness, he continued to work in the laboratory until the end of his life. He died on March 31, 2005, from lung cancer in Boston, Massachusetts.
