= Shaw High School (Ohio) =

Location
- 15320 Euclid Ave; East Cleveland, Ohio 44112; United States
- Coordinates: 41°32′13″N 81°34′26″W

Information
- School type: Public, coeducational
- School district: East Cleveland City School District
- Superintendent: Henry Pettiegrew II
- Principal: Larry Ellis
- Teaching staff: 42.00 (FTE)
- Grades: 9–12
- Enrollment: 441 (2023–2024)
- Student to teacher ratio: 10.50
- Colors: Red and black
- Athletics conference: Lake Erie League
- Team name: Cardinals
- Accreditation: Ohio Department of Education
- Website: eastclevelandk12ohus-38-us-east1-01.preview.finalsitecdn.com

Shaw High School is a public high school in East Cleveland, Ohio, United States. It is the only high school in the East Cleveland City School District and serves approximately 630 students in grades 9 through 12. The current Shaw facility was constructed around 2007. Larry Ellis is the principal. Athletic teams are known as the Cardinals and the school colors are red and black.

== Arts ==
The school's marching band, the Mighty Cardinal Marching Band, performs at various events throughout the year in and around Cleveland, along with home football games at historic Shaw Stadium. In 2008, they traveled to China after being selected to perform at ceremonies for the 2008 Beijing Summer Olympics.

== State championships ==
- Baseball – 1944, 1968
- Boys track and field – 1915, 1916, 1919

== Notable alumni ==
- Jim Backus, actor
- Denayne Davidson-Dixon, professional football player in the Arena Football League
- Wayne Dawson, television news anchor
- Erwin Griswold, served as dean of Harvard Law School for 21 years
- Clare Grundman, composer for bands
- John Henton, actor/comedian
- Bob Kelly, professional baseball player in Major League Baseball (MLB)
- Buzzy Linhart, musician, songwriter, actor
- Joe Little III, singer-songwriter
- Tom Matte, professional football player in the National Football League (NFL)
- Ruth McKenney, author
- Eric Moten, professional football player in the NFL
- Eleanor Parker, actress
- Art Sansom, cartoonist
- Buddy Schultz, professional baseball player in MLB
- Darryl Talley, professional football player in the NFL
