= Joseph Ching-Ming Wu =

Stanford-based professor and medical researcher

Joseph Ching-Ming Wu is a professor and medical researcher.

== Career ==
He is the Simon H. Stertzer Professor of Medicine & Radiology at Stanford University and the director of the Stanford Cardiovascular Institute.

In 2022 he was elected to the Academia Sinica.
