= East Cleveland, Ohio =

City in Ohio, United States

- City
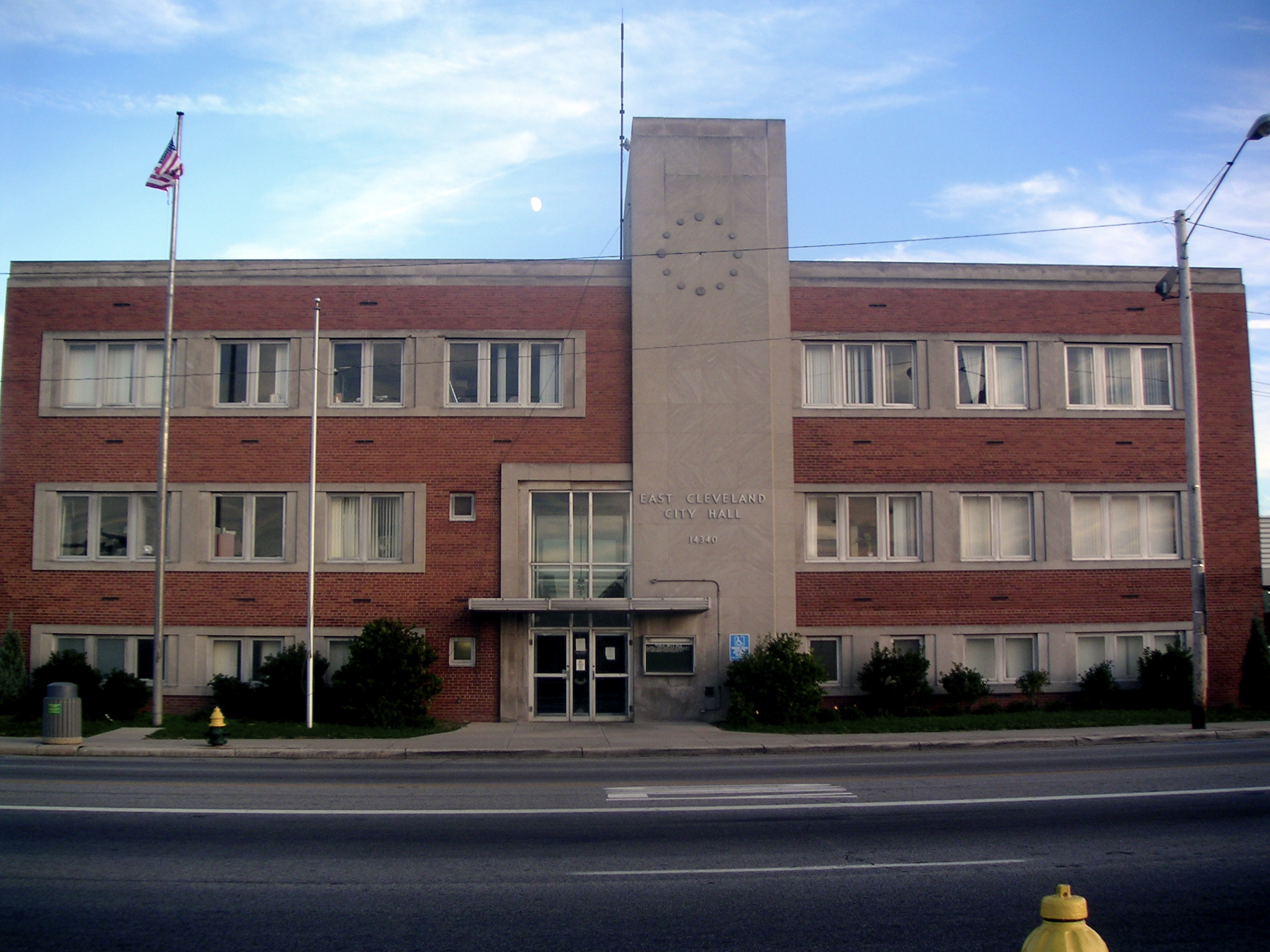
- East Cleveland City Hall

- Flag Seal
- Interactive map of East Cleveland, Ohio
- Location within Ohio Location within the United States
- Coordinates: 41.530657°N 81.578516°W
- Country: United States
- State: Ohio
- County: Cuyahoga
- Incorporated: 1895 (village); 1911 (city)

Government
  - Mayor: Sandra Morgan

Area
  - Total: 3.090 sq mi (8.003 km^{2})
  - Land: 3.083 sq mi (7.985 km^{2})
  - Water: 0.0073 sq mi (0.019 km^{2}) 0.23%
- Elevation: 686 ft (209 m)

Population (2020)
  - Total: 13,792
  - Estimate (2024): 13,402
  - Density: 4,350/sq mi (1,678/km^{2})
- Time zone: UTC–5 (Eastern (EST))
  - Summer (DST): UTC–4 (EDT)
- ZIP Codes: 44110, 44112, 44118
- Area code: 216
- FIPS code: 39-23380
- GNIS feature ID: 1064577
- Website: eastcleveland.org

East Cleveland is a city in Cuyahoga County, Ohio, United States. The population was 13,792 at the 2020 census, and was estimated to be 13,402 in 2024. It is a suburb lying east and south of Cleveland and west of Cleveland Heights.

== History ==
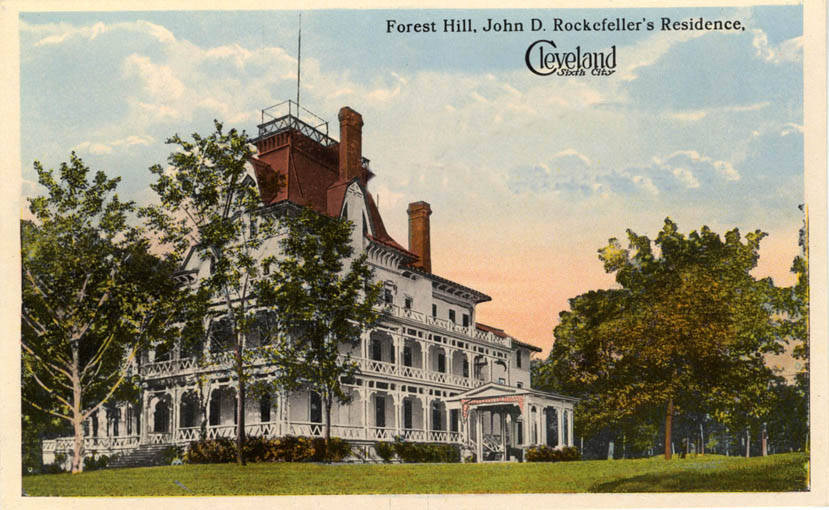
Forest Hill, John D. Rockefeller's East Cleveland mansion

Historically East Cleveland was partially founded by Scottish immigrants, whose names can still be found in the city such as Shaw, McIlrath, and Eddy. East Cleveland incorporated as a village in 1895 and became a city in 1911. This charter included provisions for women's suffrage, which at the time was unheard of east of the Mississippi River. Before the charter passed, the city of Cleveland unsuccessfully attempted to annex the emerging municipality in 1910 and again in 1916.

East Cleveland is home to General Electric's historic Nela Park, the world's first industrial park. Nela Park, which was added to the National Register of Historic Places in 1975, continues to operate today as the functional headquarters for GE Lighting and is the city's second largest employer. Huron Hospital, a satellite hospital of the Cleveland Clinic, was the city's largest employer. Huron Hospital was a notable health care facility, being the only Level-II trauma center between Cleveland's MetroHealth Medical Center, located on West 25th Street, and Hillcrest Hospital, located in Mayfield Heights. Huron Hospital closed in early spring of 2011.

Euclid Avenue was the city's "Millionaires Row" and home to many wealthy industrialists, among them John D. Rockefeller. During the 1920s and 1930s, a number of homes on Euclid Ave were demolished and replaced with commercial buildings and parking lots. In the 1950s, during the construction of the Innerbelt Freeway, more of these historical houses were removed. In the 21st century, a small number of the original luxury homes survive.

After World War II, development of other suburbs within the region brought a number of changes to East Cleveland. By the 1960s, African Americans constituted an increasingly large portion of the city's population. By 1984, East Cleveland was one of the largest primarily black communities in Ohio, with a population of 36,957.

== Geography ==
According to the United States Census Bureau, the city has a total area of 3.090 square miles (8.00 km^{2}), of which 3.083 square miles (7.98 km^{2}) is land and 0.007 square miles (0.02 km^{2}) (0.23%) is water.

Most of the city is located in a relatively flat and relatively lower area contiguous with the city of Cleveland. A small portion of the city lies atop a steep hill, and is contiguous with the neighboring city of Cleveland Heights; it also lies in a relatively flat area at a higher elevation. Superior Road, Forest Hills Boulevard, Lee Road, Noble and North Taylor roads are the major through-streets ascending the hill. The McGregor Home and the Forest Hill Historic District are located on "the hill." The city is notable for its high amount of abandoned buildings.

=== Surrounding communities ===
The University Circle neighborhood of Cleveland is immediately to the west of East Cleveland, on the other side of a railway viaduct that carries the RTA Red Line. Case Western Reserve University, University Hospitals Cleveland Medical Center, and the Cleveland Museum of Art are in University Circle.

== Demographics ==
Historical population
Census	Pop.	Note	%±
1880	2,876		—
1890	2,876		0.0%
1900	2,757		−4.1%
1910	9,179		232.9%
1920	27,292		197.3%
1930	39,667		45.3%
1940	39,495		−0.4%
1950	40,047		1.4%
1960	37,991		−5.1%
1970	39,600		4.2%
1980	36,957		−6.7%
1990	33,096		−10.4%
2000	27,217		−17.8%
2010	17,843		−34.4%
2020	13,792		−22.7%
2024 (est.)	13,402		−2.8%
U.S. Decennial Census; 2020 Census

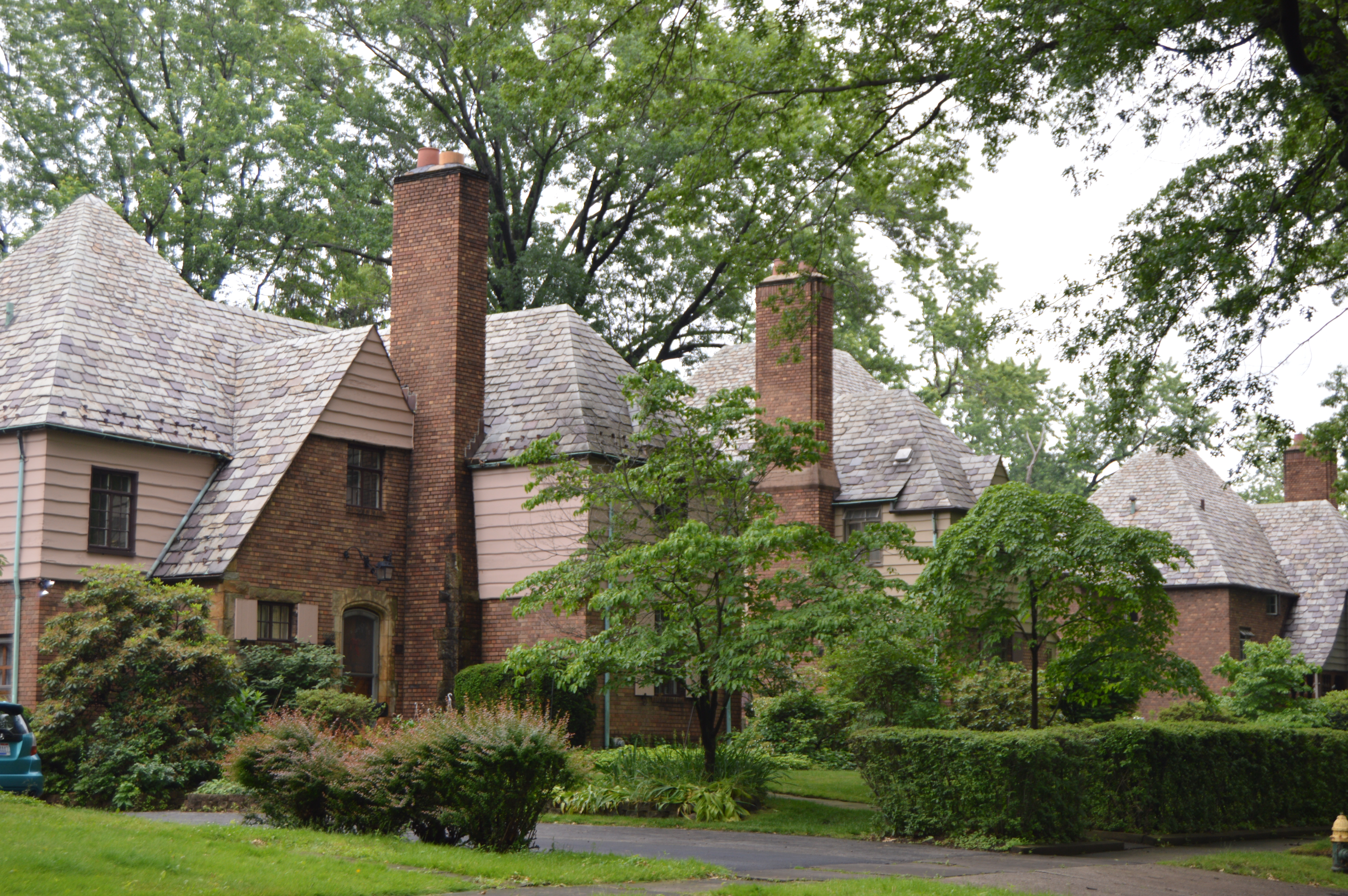
Forest Hill Historic District

According to realtor website Zillow, the average price of a home as of May 31, 2025, in East Cleveland is $71,484.

As of the 2023 American Community Survey, there are 6,746 estimated households in East Cleveland with an average of 1.97 persons per household. The city has a median household income of $22,883. Approximately 44.3% of the city's population lives at or below the poverty line. East Cleveland has an estimated 53.7% employment rate, with 15.8% of the population holding a bachelor's degree or higher and 84.9% holding a high school diploma.

The median age in the city was 39.1 years.

=== Racial and ethnic composition ===
East Cleveland, Ohio – racial and ethnic composition Note: the US Census treats Hispanic/Latino as an ethnic category. This table excludes Latinos from the racial categories and assigns them to a separate category. Hispanics/Latinos may be of any race.
Race / ethnicity (NH = non-Hispanic)	Pop. 1980	Pop. 1990	Pop. 2000	Pop. 2010	Pop. 2020	% 1980	% 1990	% 2000	% 2010	% 2020
White alone (NH)	4,634	1,751	1,219	796	630	12.54%	5.29%	4.48%	4.46%	4.57%
Black or African American alone (NH)	31,641	30,886	25,291	16,532	12,314	85.62%	93.32%	92.92%	92.65%	89.28%
Native American or Alaska Native alone (NH)	24	35	46	38	31	0.06%	0.11%	0.17%	0.21%	0.22%
Asian alone (NH)	161	213	61	40	44	0.44%	0.64%	0.22%	0.22%	0.32%
Native Hawaiian or Pacific Islander alone (NH)	x	x	4	0	5	x	x	0.01%	0.00%	0.04%
Other race alone (NH)	57	26	34	16	64	0.15%	0.08%	0.12%	0.09%	0.46%
Mixed race or multiracial (NH)	x	x	355	242	474	x	x	1.30%	1.36%	3.44%
Hispanic or Latino (any race)	440	185	207	179	230	1.19%	0.56%	0.76%	1.00%	1.67%
Total	36,957	33,096	27,217	17,843	13,792	100.00%	100.00%	100.00%	100.00%	100.00%

=== 2020 census ===
As of the 2020 census, East Cleveland had a population of 13,792 and a median age of 44.8 years. 20.2% of residents were under the age of 18 and 22.8% of residents were 65 years of age or older. For every 100 females there were 90.5 males, and for every 100 females age 18 and over there were 86.7 males age 18 and over.

As of the 2020 census, 100.0% of residents lived in urban areas while 0.0% lived in rural areas.

As of the 2020 census, there were 6,881 households in East Cleveland, of which 21.3% had children under the age of 18 living in them. Of all households, 12.4% were married-couple households, 32.8% were households with a male householder and no spouse or partner present, and 48.8% were households with a female householder and no spouse or partner present. About 51.2% of all households were made up of individuals and 19.5% had someone living alone who was 65 years of age or older.

As of the 2020 census, there were 3,012 families residing in the city; the population density was 4,473.56 inhabitants per square mile (1,727.3/km^{2}). There were 9,220 housing units at an average density of 2,990.59 per square mile (1,154.7/km^{2}).

As of the 2020 census, 25.4% of the city's 9,220 housing units were vacant; the homeowner vacancy rate was 1.5% and the rental vacancy rate was 15.5%.

Racial composition as of the 2020 census
Race	Number	Percent
White	639	4.6%
Black or African American	12,403	89.9%
American Indian and Alaska Native	33	0.2%
Asian	47	0.3%
Native Hawaiian and Other Pacific Islander	7	0.1%
Some other race	110	0.8%
Two or more races	553	4.0%

In 2018, East Cleveland was ranked as the 4th poorest city in the United States. Moreover, the city had a 41.8% poverty rate along with a $19,953 median household income.

=== 2010 census ===
As of the 2010 Census, there were 17,843 people, 8,286 households, and 4,043 families residing in the city. The population density was 5,774.4 inhabitants per square mile (2,229.5/km^{2}). There were 12,523 housing units at an average density of 4,052.8 per square mile (1,564.8/km^{2}). The racial makeup of the city was 4.58% White, 93.25% African American, 0.22% Native American, 0.22% Asian, 0.00% Pacific Islander, 0.21% from some other races and 1.52% from two or more races. Hispanic or Latino people of any race were 1.00% of the population.

There were 8,286 households, of which 24.9% had children under the age of 18 living with them, 16.5% were married couples living together, 26.4% had a female householder with no husband present, 5.9% had a male householder with no wife present, and 51.2% were non-families. 46.2% of all households were made up of individuals, and 15.4% had someone living alone who was 65 years of age or older. The average household size was 2.11 and the average family size was 3.03.

The median age in the city was 42.6 years. 22.2% of residents were under the age of 18; 9.8% were between the ages of 18 and 24; 20.6% were from 25 to 44; 28.6% were from 45 to 64; and 18.8% were 65 years of age or older. The gender makeup of the city was 45.1% male and 54.9% female.

=== 2000 census ===
As of the 2000 Census, there were 27,217 people, 11,210 households, and 6,423 families residing in the city. The population density was 8,761.8 inhabitants per square mile (3,382.9/km^{2}). There were 13,491 housing units at an average density of 4,343.1 per square mile (1,676.9/km^{2}). The racial makeup of the city was 4.56% White, 93.39% African American, 0.22% Native American, 0.22% Asian, 0.01% Pacific Islander, 0.17% from some other races and 1.43% from two or more races. Hispanic or Latino people of any race were 0.76% of the population.

There were 11,210 households, out of which 28.5% had children under the age of 18 living with them, 21.2% were married couples living together, 30.3% had a female householder with no husband present, and 42.7% were non-families. 38.0% of all households were made up of individuals, and 11.4% had someone living alone who was 65 years of age or older. The average household size was 2.39 and the average family size was 3.20.

In the city, the population was spread out, with 29.7% under the age of 18, 9.0% from 18 to 24, 26.6% from 25 to 44, 21.4% from 45 to 64, and 13.3% 65 years of age or older. The median age was 34 years. For every 100 females, there were 79.6 males. For every 100 females age 18 and over, there were 72.1 males.

The median income for a household in the city was $20,542, and the median income for a family was $26,053. Males had a median income of $26,123 versus $21,960 for females. The per capita income for the city was $12,602. About 28.0% of families and 32.0% of the population were below the poverty line, including 45.5% of those under age 18 and 22.5% of those age 65 or over.

== Economy ==
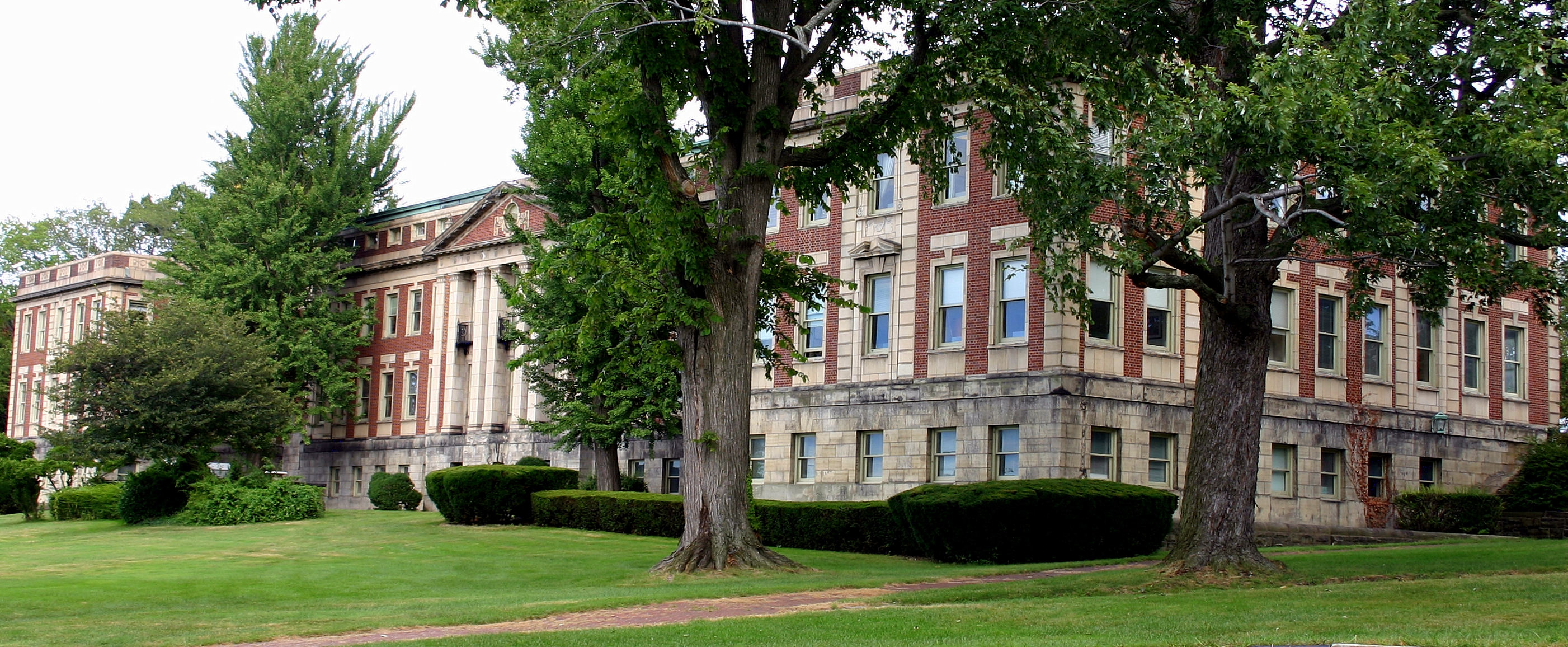
General Electric's Nela Park was the world's first industrial park.

Per the 2012 Economic Census there are 1,105 locally owned businesses in East Cleveland. Of these firms 944 are owned by minorities and 733 by women. The portion of firms owned by minorities and women are significantly higher than both the state and national average.

A complete road repair of both Euclid Ave and Superior Ave has also led to interest and land purchases in the vicinity.

	% of firms owned by women	% of firms owned by minorities
East Cleveland	66.33%	85.43%
Ohio	33.91%	13.56%
United States	35.76%	28.79%

== Parks and recreation ==
The 248-acre (1.00 km^{2}) Forest Hill Park boasts three baseball diamonds, tennis courts and walking trails that have retained the natural green space as intended by John D. Rockefeller Jr. when he deeded the park to East Cleveland and the City of Cleveland Heights. Forest Hill Park is the largest single body of green park space between two large metroparks on the far east and west sides of Cleveland, Ohio. The city also features Pattison Park and Hawley Park.

== Government ==
East Cleveland is a charter city that is granted its authority under the home rule provisions of the Ohio constitution.

Prior to 1985, East Cleveland had been under the leadership of a Commission and City Manager. In 1985 voters grew frustrated with that form of government after two commissioners were charged with theft in office, and after a revolving door of city managers resulted in little stability and a reduction in services. Citizens for Sound Government, a group of residents, led a petition drive to elect a strong mayor and to create a five-member city council. Attorney Darryl E. Pittman became the first mayor to lead the city since 1908. He was sworn in on January 1, 1986.

After two years on the job, in Pittman's second two-year term, Ohio's State Auditor declared on September 9, 1988 that East Cleveland was in fiscal emergency. The fiscal emergency designation came when the water and sewer fund were found to have deficits in excess of $2 million. Pittman was defeated in 1989 by Wallace D. Davis, the council president and a funeral home owner. Prior to his defeat, Pittman convinced former U.S. Rep. Louis Stokes to support a congressional amendment that made East Cleveland a "direct entitlement city" under HUD. That designation gave the city the authority to receive more than $1 million a year in block grant funding directly from HUD.

Davis borrowed $2.5 million that had to be paid back in eight years to get the city out of fiscal emergency. His administration made the last payment in 1997, but the city remained in fiscal emergency throughout Mayor Emmanuel Onunwor's eight-year term in office, and after he was indicted and convicted on federal charges of racketeering and corruption in 2004. Onunwor was sentenced to nine years in federal prison in September 2004. He was replaced by Council President Saratha Goggins who finished the remainder of his term.

Eric J. Brewer became the city's fourth elected mayor on January 1, 2006 and served one term. Brewer had been an investigative journalist. He negotiated an agreement with Cleveland Mayor Frank Jackson to take over East Cleveland's water department in 2008, resulting in significant savings to help the city as it struggled through fiscal emergency. The deal resulted in the transfer of city employees to Cleveland as part of the 25-year agreement.

During his primary re-election campaign in 2009, Brewer accused the police union of releasing photographs depicting him wearing women's lingerie.

Gary Norton, a Democrat first elected to the city council in 2006, was elected mayor after defeating Brewer by a nearly 2-1 margin in the Democratic primary election. He took office in January 2010. He did not face a challenger in the general election.

After two unsuccessful recall attempts, Gary Norton and city council president Thomas Wheeler were defeated in a special recall election on December 6, 2016. Norton lost 548 to 528 and Wheeler lost 229 to 211. The city council's vice president, Brandon King, assumed Norton's position as mayor. King won the September 2016 Democratic primary for mayor, and was elected on in November 2017 to serve out the remainder of Norton's term.

Sandra Morgan, granddaughter of inventor Garrett Morgan, was appointed interim mayor in February 2025.

=== List of mayors ===
Mayors of East Cleveland, Ohio

Image	Mayor	Years	Notes
	Darryl E. Pittman	September 1985 –	First mayor since 1914. First African-American mayor of East Cleveland.
	Wallace D. Davis	1990 –	
	Emmanuel Onunwor	1998 – September 1, 2004	First mayor in the United States to have been born in Africa; Resigned on September 1, 2004 after being convicted for racketeering, extortion, mail fraud, and tax evasion.
	Saratha Goggins	2004–2006	City Council President Goggins served as interim mayor after the resignation of mayor Emmanuel Onunwor; First female African-American mayor of East Cleveland Defeated by Eric J. Brewer who earned 54.90% of the vote to her 29.96% in the Democratic primary in 2005
	Eric J. Brewer	– January 2010	
	Gary Norton	January 2010 – December 6, 2016	Elected January 2010 Removed after recall election on December 6, 2016.
	Brandon King	December 6, 2016 – February 2025	Elected to the City Council in 2014. Assumed position of mayor on December 6, 2016 after Gary Norton was recalled in special election. Elected as mayor in November 2017. Resigned from office in February 2025 after being indicted for Theft in Office. Convicted on May 29, 2025 and sentenced to probation and community service.
	Sandra Morgan	February 2025 – June 1, 2025	Appointed by a local judge as interim mayor in February 2025 after mayor Brandon King was indicted for Theft in Office; Replaced on June 1, 2025 after Lateek Shabazz was sworn-in as mayor although Morgan challenged his appointment. On July 17, 2025, an Ohio Court of Appeals ruled in a 2-1 split decision Thursday that Shabazz was the legitimate mayor of East Cleveland.
	Lateek Shabazz	June 1, 2025 – November 2025	Sworn in as mayor on June 1, 2025 to replace interim mayor Sandra Morgan; The decision was challenged by Morgan; an appeals court ruled in Shabazz's favor on July 17, 2025.
	Sandra Morgan (2nd term)	November 2025 – Present	Elected to a full term in the general election.

=== Crime ===
The violent crime rate of 7.69 per 100,000 residents is about twice the national rate of 3.8 and above the statewide rate of 2.85. In the same way, the number of reported crimes per square mile (168) is about five times that of Ohio (35) and the nation (32.8).

=== Arrest of Arnold Black ===
On April 28, 2012, Detective Randy Hicks, Officer Jonathan O'Leary, and other members of the East Cleveland Police Department arrested Arnold Black on suspicion of drug activity. Hicks punched Black as O'Leary stood by. Black was then placed in a holding cell after his arrest and was later released. Black claimed that the police beat him while he was handcuffed and locked him in a storage closet for four days with no toilet and nothing to eat or drink but a carton of milk. In the resulting lawsuit, the police were unable to produce dashboard camera video of the beating or any police reports of the arrest. A jury initially awarded Black $22 million, including $10 million from Police Chief Ralph Spotts. The city appealed the verdict and the Eighth District Court of Appeals overturned the decision. The Ohio Supreme Court also refused to hear Black's appeal. However at a subsequent re-trial in 2019 Black was awarded US$20 million in compensatory damages and US$30 million in punitive damages.

== Education ==
The East Cleveland demographics on the levels of education are as follows: with 34% of residents having a high school diploma or equivalent, 37% have at least some college, and 7% have a completed bachelor's degree.

=== East Cleveland City Schools ===
The East Cleveland City School District provides public education to more than 3000 students in seven new or renovated buildings that were updated as part of a $94 million state-sponsored school construction project. Voters in 1997 agreed to add another $10 million to the $94 million for operating costs.

According to the Ohio Department of Education reports from January 2016, nearly 30% of high school students attending East Cleveland City Schools fail to graduate on time. Students are falling behind state expectations in English, Language Arts, and Mathematics. The district also lags behind the state in the performance index score. During the 2014–2015 school year, East Cleveland City Schools’ performance index score was 66.8. This was the lowest it had been in four years.

East Cleveland schools consist of Shaw High School, Heritage Middle School (formerly Kirk Middle School), Prospect Elementary School (closed in 2016) open for administrative use, Chambers Elementary School, Superior Elementary School, Mayfair Elementary School and Caledonia Elementary School. Rozelle Elementary School was closed due to lower student enrollment and was later demolished.

East Cleveland Public Library operates the Main Branch at 14101 Euclid Avenue. In December 2009 the Caledonia Branch at 960 Caledonia Avenue, and the North Branch at 1425 Hayden Avenue were closed due to budget cuts and the decline in population. East Cleveland Public Library became a member of CLEVNET in 1985.

== Infrastructure ==
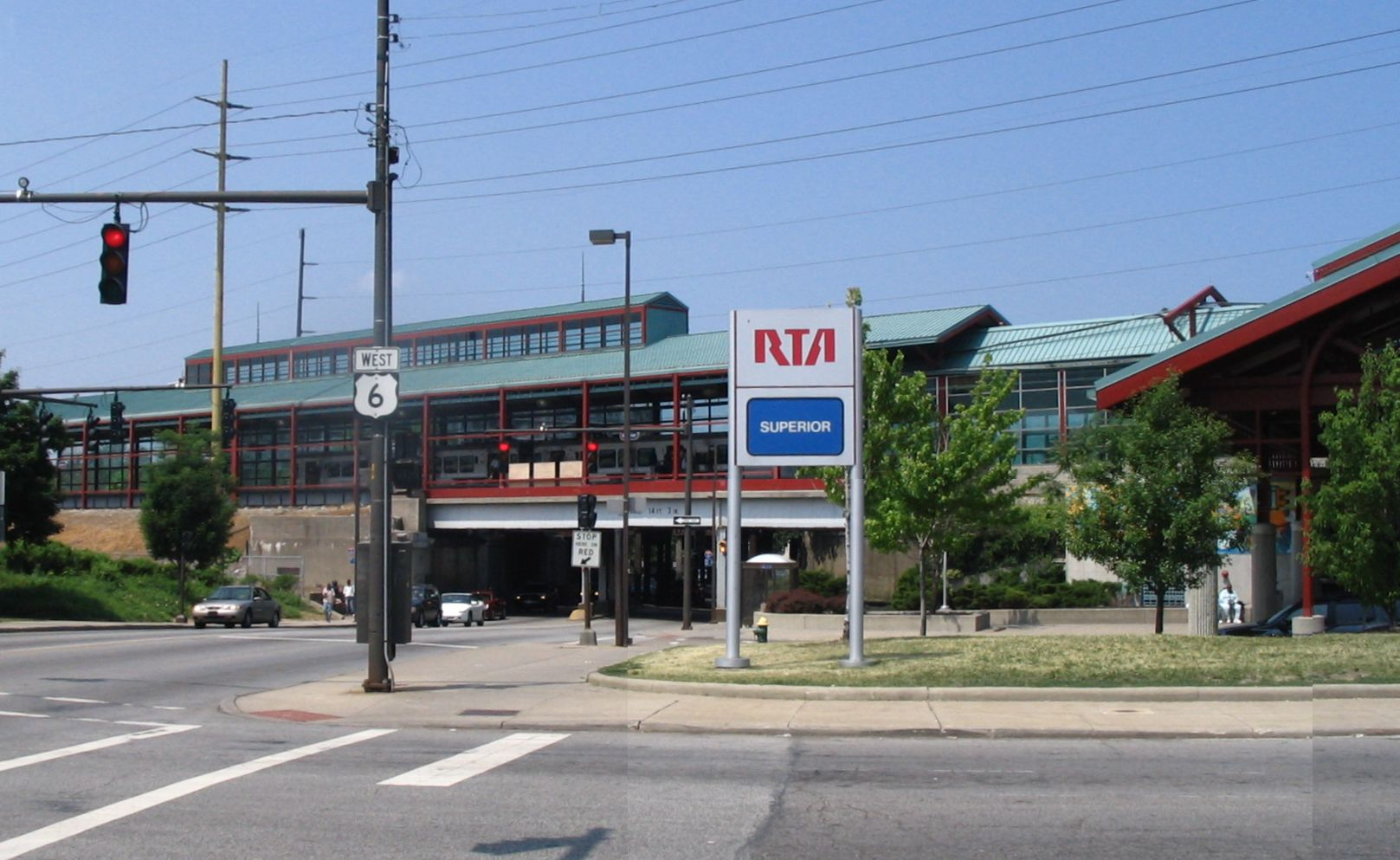
Superior station on the RTA Red Line

East Cleveland is a major public transportation hub for northeast Ohio with a total of 80 (approximately one-third) of the Greater Cleveland Regional Transit Authority bus routes beginning or ending inside the city.

The GCRTA's Red Line's eastern terminus is located at the Windermere Rapid Station, located on Euclid Avenue in East Cleveland. Destinations along the Red Line include University Circle, Cleveland State University, Tower City Center/Public Square, the West Side Market, and Hopkins International Airport. Passengers boarding GCRTA buses with stops in East Cleveland have access to an even wider range of employment, educational, recreational and cultural destinations throughout the Cleveland area.

=== Medical care ===
East Cleveland is home to several medical care facilities including the Candlewood Park Healthcare Center and the Stephanie Tubbs Jones Health Center. Candlewood Park Healthcare Center offers care for senior citizens including outpatient care, behavioral healthcare and rehabilitation services. The Stephanie Tubbs Jones Health Center, which is also a Cleveland Clinic facility, specializes in many different areas including cardiology, chronic disease services, diabetes, internal medicine, and general surgeries.

== Notable people ==
- Ed Benedict, animator
- Clarence Berger, professional baseball player
- Stephen Blum, ethnomusicologist
- Yvette Nicole Brown, actress
- Christine Chubbuck, news reporter, first televised suicide
- JaQuan Hardy, professional football player
- John Henton, actor and comedian
- Dale T. Knobel, historian and academic administrator
- Michael Madison, serial killer
- Ruth McKenney, author and journalist
- Dante Moore, college football player
- Eleanor Parker, actress
- Art Sansom, cartoonist
- Bruce F. Scharschmidt, physician
- Burt E. Skeel, pilot
- Ernest Sprague, football player, public official, and engineer
- Mike Trivisonno, radio broadcaster
- David John Walkowiak, prelate
- Bert Wolstein, real estate developer, sports team owner, and philanthropist
