= Andrew Marks =

American cardiologist and molecular biologist

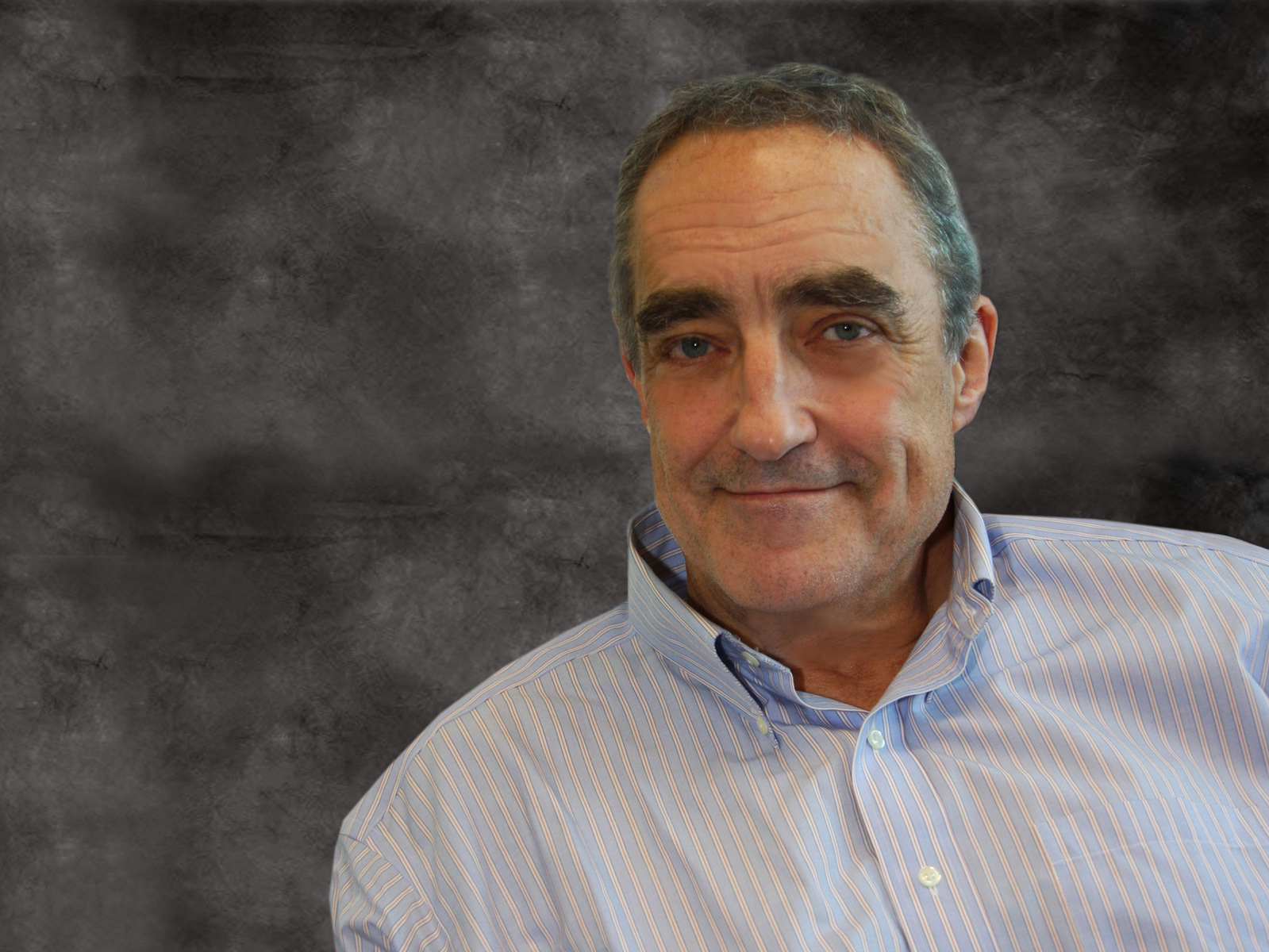
Andrew R. Marks, M.D.

Andrew Robert Marks (born February 22, 1955), is an American cardiologist and molecular biologist. He is Professor and Chair of the Department of Physiology and Cellular Biophysics at Columbia University College of Physicians and Surgeons, Founding Director of the Clyde and Helen Wu Center for Molecular Cardiology, and a Wu Professor of Medicine.

Marks developed the first drug-eluting stent coated with rapamycin in an effort to reduce fatty plaque buildup on the stent material itself.
