= American Society for Clinical Investigation =

Nonprofit medical honor society

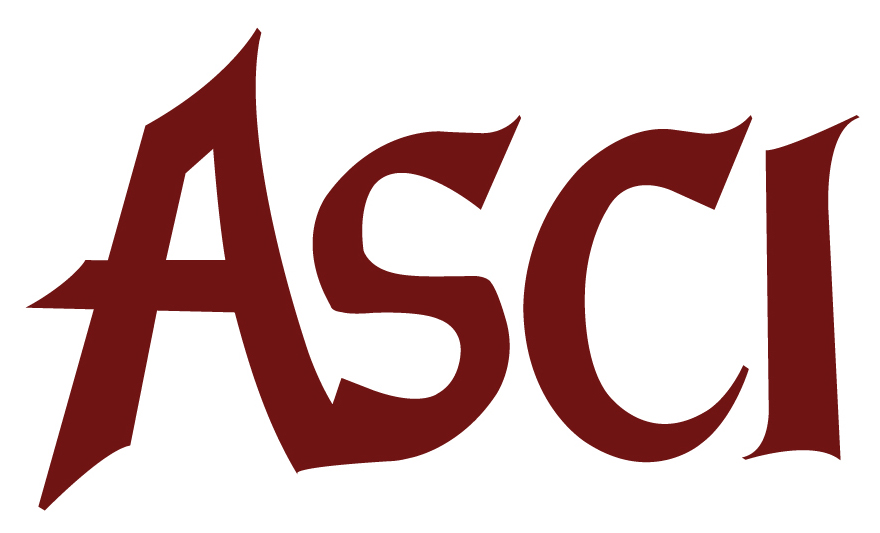

The American Society for Clinical Investigation (ASCI), established in 1908, is an American honor society for those who have chosen a major in medicine.

== Organization and purpose ==
The ASCI is an honorary society to which more than 2,800 physician-scientists from all medical specialties belong. Prospective members are proposed by standing members of the society and elected to ASCI on the basis of an outstanding record of scholarly achievement in biomedical research. The ASCI includes physician-scientists who are active clinically, in basic research, or in teaching. Many of its senior members are widely recognized leaders in academic medicine. As of 2015 the membership of ASCI has included 417 members of the National Academy of Medicine, 191 members of the National Academies of Sciences, Engineering, and Medicine, 40 Lasker Award winners, and 19 Nobel laureates.

The ASCI supports the research into basic mechanisms and/or treatment of human diseases, and to the education of future generations of physician-scientists. The ASCI considers the nominations of physician-scientists from the United States and abroad each year and elects up to 100 new members each year in for their significant research accomplishments relatively early in their careers.

The ASCI publishes the peer-reviewed biomedical research journals Journal of Clinical Investigation and JCI Insight.

A collection of the society's papers is held at the National Library of Medicine.

== History ==
The American Society for Clinical Investigation has its origins in a chance meeting in June 1907 on the Atlantic City boardwalk, in which Samuel James Meltzer, David Linn Edsall, Wilder Tileston, Warfield Theobald Longcope, and probably Joseph Hersey Pratt were present ("ASCI Secretary’s Book, 1907–1965". History of Medicine Division. Bethesda, MD: National Library of Medicine.). The parties to this meeting considered the need for a new society, separate from the Association of American Physicians (AAP), whose membership was at that time limited to 160 individuals. The purpose of the new society would be to give younger men who were not yet members of the AAP, and not eligible for membership in the AAP, the advantages of meeting other young men active in medical research. The new organization was formally constituted on May 11, 1908, at the New Willard Hotel in Washington. A total of 32 physicians agreed to become charter members of ASCI in 1908. The first meeting of the ASCI was held in Atlantic City on May 10, 1909. The organization was also known as the "Young Turks" in allusion to the rebellious spirit in which it was founded, as a counterweight to the older and more deeply established Association of American Physicians (colloquially known as the "Old Turks" in subsequent years). These terms are no longer used by the Society.

== Stanley J. Korsmeyer Award ==
Since 1998, the ASCI has awarded an annual prize to a scientist renowned for advancing his/her field and mentoring future scientists. Originally called the "ASCI Award," it was renamed in 2006 in honor of Stanley Korsmeyer, the award's first recipient, who had died the previous year from lung cancer at the age of 54. The awardee receives a US$20,000 honorarium and presents the Korsmeyer Lecture at the Society's annual meeting.

Year	Winner(s)
2026	Joseph C. Wu
2025	Kimryn Rathmell
2024	Howard Y. Chang
2023	Nicole Calakos
2022	Peter Tontonoz
2021	Benjamin L. Ebert
2020	Judith A. James
2019	Michael S. Diamond
2018	Joseph Heitman
2017	James E. Crowe, Jr.
2016	Jean-Laurent Casanova
2015	Louis J. Ptáček
2014	Beth Levine
2013	Bruce Beutler
2012	William G. Kaelin, Gregg L. Semenza
2011	Brian J. Druker, Charles L. Sawyers
2010	Andrew R. Marks
2009	Mitchell A. Lazar
2008	Gerald I. Shulman
2007	D. Gary Gilliland
2006	Shaun R. Coughlin
2005	Francis Collins
2004	David Ginsburg
2003	Craig B. Thompson
2002	Ronald A. DePinho
2001	Laurie Glimcher
2000	Christine E. Seidman
1999	Richard D. Klausner
1998	Stanley J. Korsmeyer

== See also ==
- American Physician Scientists Association
