= Arteriosclerosis, Thrombosis, and Vascular Biology =

- Discipline: Cardiology, cardiovascular biology
- Language: English
- Edited by: Alan Daugherty

Publication details
- Former name(s): Arteriosclerosis; Arteriosclerosis and Thrombosis
- History: 1981–present
- Publisher: Lippincott Williams & Wilkins on behalf of the American Heart Association (United States)
- Frequency: Monthly
- Open access: Hybrid
- Impact factor: 10.514 (2021)

Standard abbreviations
- ISO 4: Arterioscler. Thromb. Vasc. Biol.

Indexing
- CODEN: ATVBFA
- ISSN: 1079-5642 (print); 1524-4636 (web)
- LCCN: 95644718
- OCLC no.: 31441121

Links
- Journal homepage

Arteriosclerosis, Thrombosis, and Vascular Biology (ATVB) is a peer-reviewed medical journal published on behalf of the American Heart Association by Lippincott Williams & Wilkins, an imprint of Wolters Kluwer. It covers basic and clinical research related to vascular biology, pathophysiology and complications of atherosclerosis, and thrombotic mechanisms in blood vessels.

The journal was established in 1981 as Arteriosclerosis (ISSN 0276-5047), which was published bimonthly. From 1991 to 1994 it was published monthly under the title Arteriosclerosis and Thrombosis: A Journal of Vascular Biology (ISSN 1049-8834).

According to the Journal Citation Reports, the journal has a 2020 impact factor of 8.311, ranking it 8th in the category "Hematology" and 5th in the category "Peripheral Vascular Disease". Alan Daugherty has been the editor-in-chief since 2012.

== Open access option ==
ATVB offers an open access option for full-length, original contributions. The corresponding author may select an open access option during the first submission of the manuscript. All articles published under open access license will incur an article processing charge, with three open access options available.

All ATVB papers are available for free, full-text access after a 12-month embargo period after publication. Immediate access to full-text papers less than a year old requires membership of the American Heart Association or the American Stroke Association, or a paid subscription.
