= South Cumminsville, Cincinnati =

Coordinates: 39°09′14″N 84°32′53″W

South Cumminsville
- Neighborhood of Cincinnati
- Flag

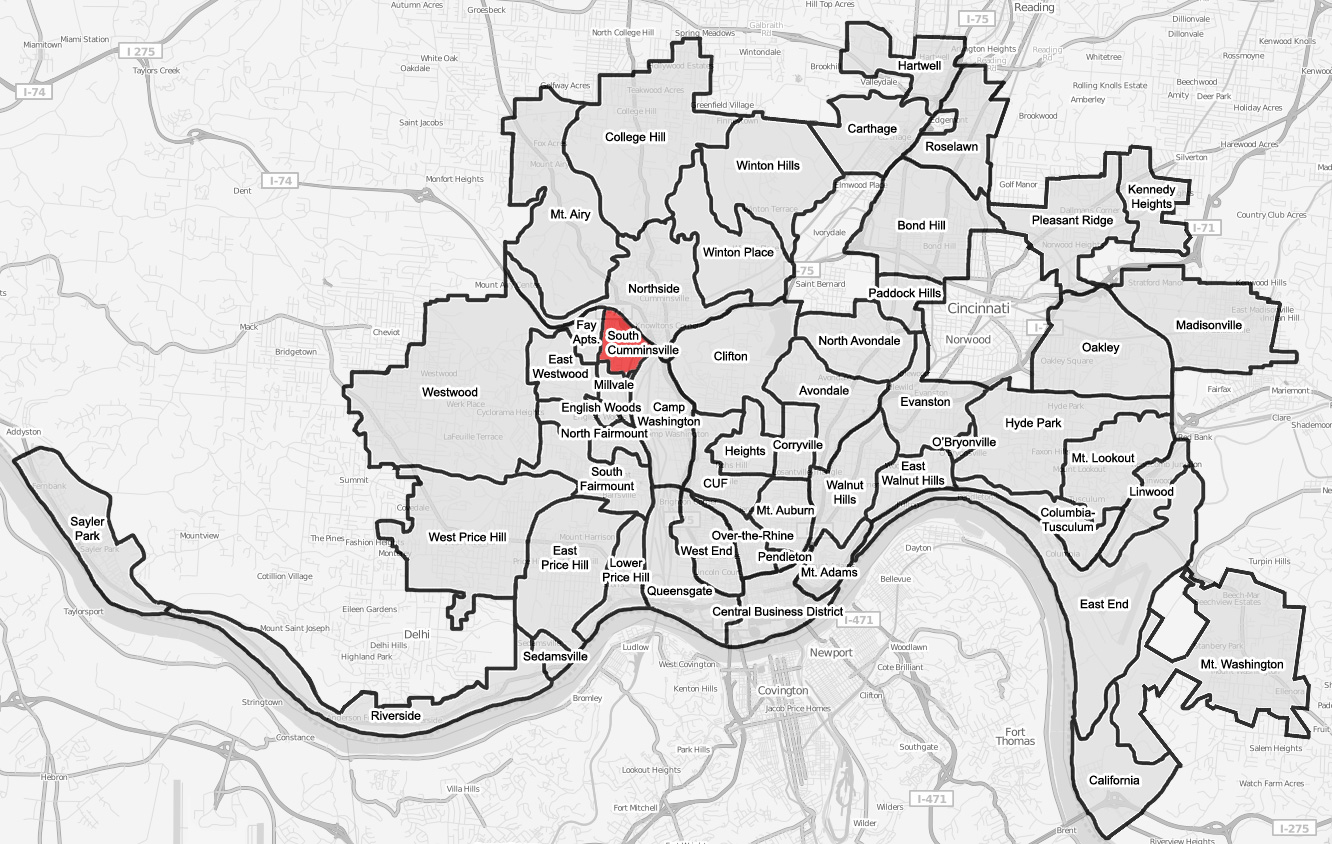
- Country: United States
- State: Ohio
- City: Cincinnati

Population (2020)
  - Total: 702
- Time zone: UTC-5 (EST)
  - Summer (DST): UTC-4 (EDT)

South Cumminsville is one of the 52 neighborhoods of Cincinnati, Ohio. The population was 702 at the 2020 census.

== History ==
South Cumminsville was originally the southern portion of a larger settlement known as Cumminsville, which is notable for having earned the moniker "Helltown" for a number of peculiarities in opposition to the prevailing moralistic values of the region in the early-1800s, such as horse racing. Cumminsville was incorporated in 1865 and annexed into Cincinnati eight years later. In the early 1900s, growth attracted many German Catholics. Cumminsville also attracted a number of African-Americans, who moved to the area of Follett and Dreman avenues. This sub-neighborhood became known as South Cumminsville, according to history books. Boosted by the opening of the Millvale apartments in the 1950s, South Cumminsville evolved into a predominantly African-American community. Many of the newcomers in the northern portions of Cumminsville became to identify themselves with Northside, while South Cumminsville retained its identity.

There was a series of unsolved murders in Cumminsville in the early 1900s. From 1904 to 1910, five women were killed within a mile of the Spring Grove and Winton Road corner in Cumminsville, earning the neighborhood the nickname "the murder zone" and sparking fear that Cincinnati was experiencing its first serial killer.

== Geography ==
South Cumminsville is bordered by Northside, Camp Washington, Millvale, and Fay Apartments.

== Demographics ==
Population of South Cumminsville 1900-2020
Year	Pop.	±%
1900	4,604	—
1910	5,360	+16.4%
1920	6,100	+13.8%
1930	7,136	+17.0%
1940	6,641	−6.9%
1950	6,464	−2.7%
1960	6,866	+6.2%
1970	5,237	−23.7%
1980	4,908	−6.3%
1990	4,367	−11.0%
2000	3,914	−10.4%
2010	801	−79.5%
2020	702	−12.4%
Numbers before 2010 include both Millvale and South Cumminsville.

As of the census of 2020, there were 702 people living in the neighborhood. There were 366 housing units. The racial makeup of the neighborhood was 6.8% White, 83.3% Black or African American, 1.3% Native American, 0.1% Asian, 0.0% Pacific Islander, 2.0% from some other race, and 6.4% from two or more races. 3.4% of the population were Hispanic or Latino of any race.

There were 234 households, out of which 32.1% were families. About 50.4% of all households were made up of individuals.

30.6% of the neighborhood's population were under the age of 18, 50.7% were 18 to 64, and 18.7% were 65 years of age or older. 59.1% of the population were male and 40.9% were female.

According to the U.S. Census American Community Survey, for the period 2016-2020 the estimated median annual income for a household in the neighborhood was $31,288. About 21.3% of family households were living below the poverty line. About 16.8% of adults had a bachelor's degree or higher.

== Notable people ==
- Dave Parker, professional baseball player
