= Fairmount, Cincinnati =

Fairmount, Cincinnati may refer to:

- North Fairmount, Cincinnati
- South Fairmount, Cincinnati
