= List of Cincinnati neighborhoods =

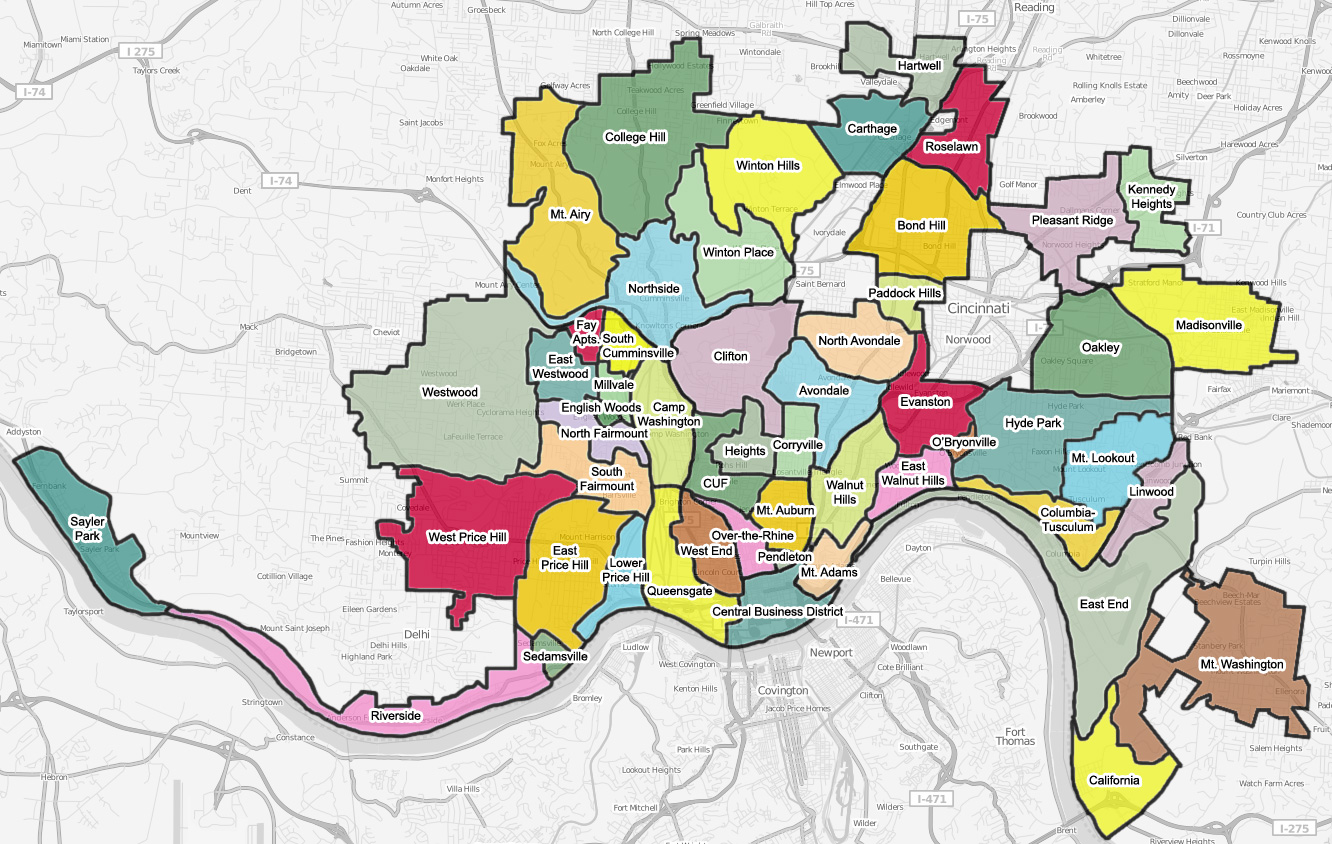
Map of Cincinnati neighborhoods

Cincinnati consists of fifty-two neighborhoods.

Many of these neighborhoods were once villages that have been annexed by the City of Cincinnati. The most important of them retain their former names, such as Walnut Hills and Mount Auburn.

== List ==
Neighborhoods are numbered and categorized by Cincinnati Police districts. Many neighborhoods have smaller communities and/or historic districts primarily within their boundaries, and those are denoted with bullet points.

=== Central Business District ===
1. Downtown
  - The Banks (Riverfront)
  - Downtown (Central Business District)
  - East Fourth Street District
  - East Manufacturing & Warehouse District
  - Fort Washington
  - Lytle Park District
  - Ninth Street District
  - Race Street District
  - West Fourth Street District
2. Mount Adams

=== District One ===
1. Over-the-Rhine
  - Brewery District
  - Gateway Quarter
  - Mohawk District
  - Northern Liberties
  - Schwartz's Point
  - Sycamore-13th Street District
2. Pendleton
3. Queensgate
4. West End
  - Betts-Longworth District
  - Brighton
  - City West (Lincoln Court)
  - Dayton Street District
  - Frenchman's Corner
  - Laurel Homes
5. CUF
  - Clifton Heights
  - Fairview
  - University Heights
6. The Heights
  - Rohs Hill
7. Mount Auburn (Keys Hill)
  - Glencoe (Inwood, formerly Little Bethlehem)
  - Goat Hill
  - Jerusalem
  - Prospect Hill

=== District Two ===
1. California
2. Columbia-Tusculum
  - Fulton
3. East End
4. East Walnut Hills
  - DeSales Corner
  - Edgecliff
5. Evanston
  - Idlewild
  - O'Bryonville
6. Hyde Park
  - Observatory District
  - Dutchtown
7. Kennedy Heights
8. Linwood
9. Madisonville
10. Mount Lookout
11. Mount Washington
12. Oakley
  - Eastwood
13. Pleasant Ridge
  - Dallman's Corner
14. Walnut Hills
  - Gilbert-Sinton District
  - Gilbert Row
  - Peebles' Corner

=== District Three ===
1. Camp Washington
2. College Hill
  - Hollywood (Teakwood)
3. East Price Hill
  - Incline District
  - St Lawrence Corners
4. East Westwood
5. English Woods
6. Lower Price Hill
7. Millvale
  - Moosewood
8. Mount Airy
  - Fox Acres
9. North Fairmount
  - Knox Hill
10. Northside (formerly Cumminsville)
  - Hoffner District
  - Knowlton's Corner
11. Riverside
  - Anderson Ferry (Constance)
12. Sayler Park
13. Sedamsville
14. South Cumminsville
15. South Fairmount
  - Barrsville
16. The Villages of Roll Hill (formerly Fay Apartments)
17. West Price Hill
  - Old Covedale
  - Cedar Grove
18. Westwood
  - Lafeuille Terrace
  - Werk Place
  - Western Hills
  - Westwood Town Center

=== District Four ===
1. Avondale
2. Bond Hill
3. Carthage
4. Clifton
  - Gaslight District
  - Ludlow Avenue District
5. Corryville
  - Short Vine District
  - Vernon Gardens
6. Hartwell
7. North Avondale
8. Paddock Hills
9. Roselawn
10. Spring Grove Village (formerly Winton Place)
11. Winton Hills
  - Winton Terrace

== See also ==
Many communities within the Cincinnati – Northern Kentucky metropolitan area are considered by local residents to be neighborhoods or suburbs of Cincinnati, but do not fall within the actual city limits, Hamilton county boundaries, or even within Ohio state borders.

=== Ohio ===
- Communities of Butler County
- Communities of Clermont County
- Communities of Hamilton County
  - Includes several enclaves within Cincinnati's outside city limits, such as St. Bernard, Elmwood Place, and Norwood
- Communities of Warren County

=== Kentucky ===
- Communities of Boone County
- Communities of Campbell County
- Communities of Kenton County

=== Indiana ===
- Communities of Dearborn County
- Communities of Franklin County
- Communities of Ohio County
