= List of School for Creative and Performing Arts people =

This is a list of people associated with the School for Creative and Performing Arts (SCPA), a magnet arts school in Cincinnati, Ohio and part of the Cincinnati Public Schools. It includes all notable alumni who attended and all of the principals and artistic directors since the founding of the school.

== Alumni ==
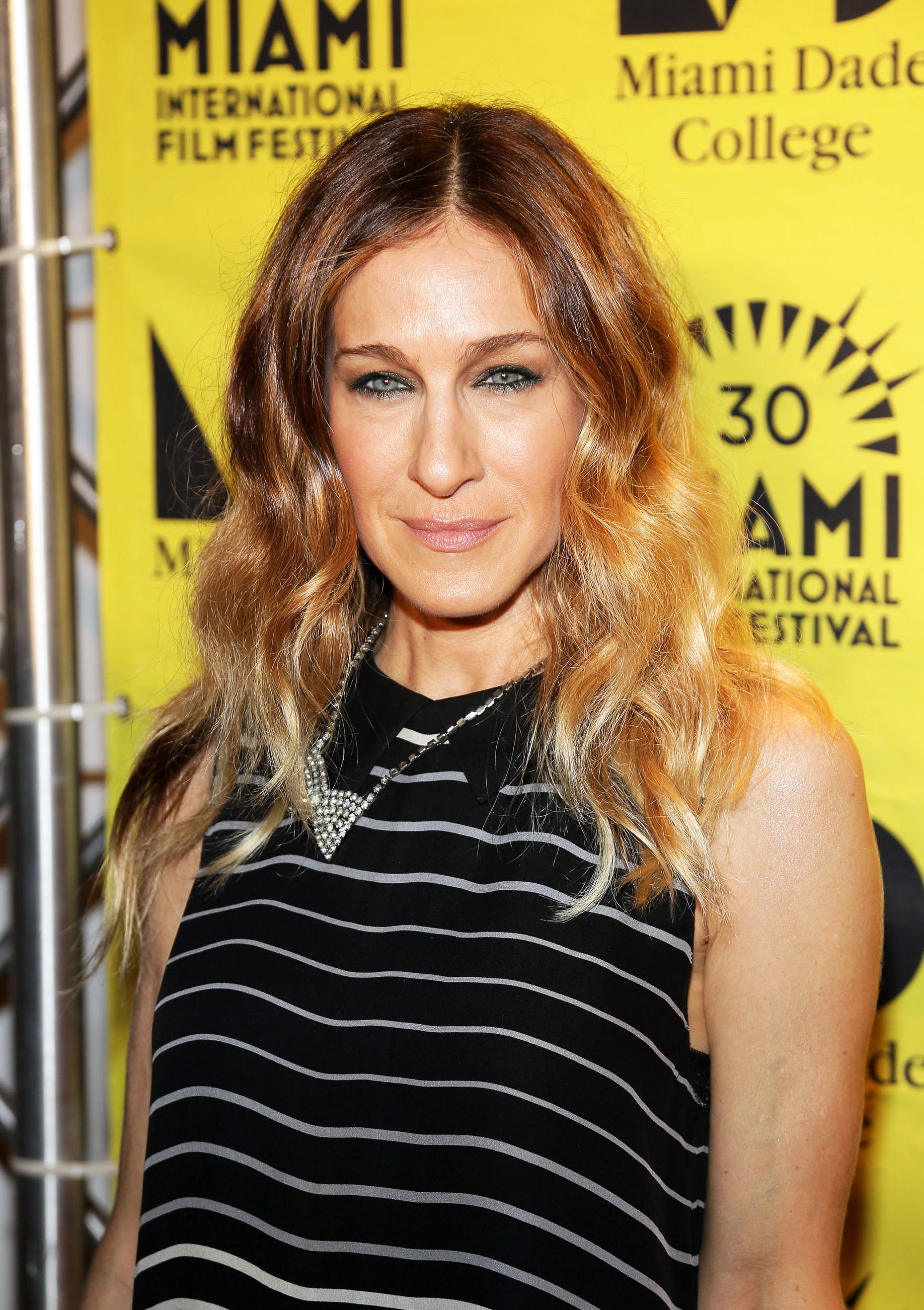
Primetime Emmy Award-winning actress Sarah Jessica Parker

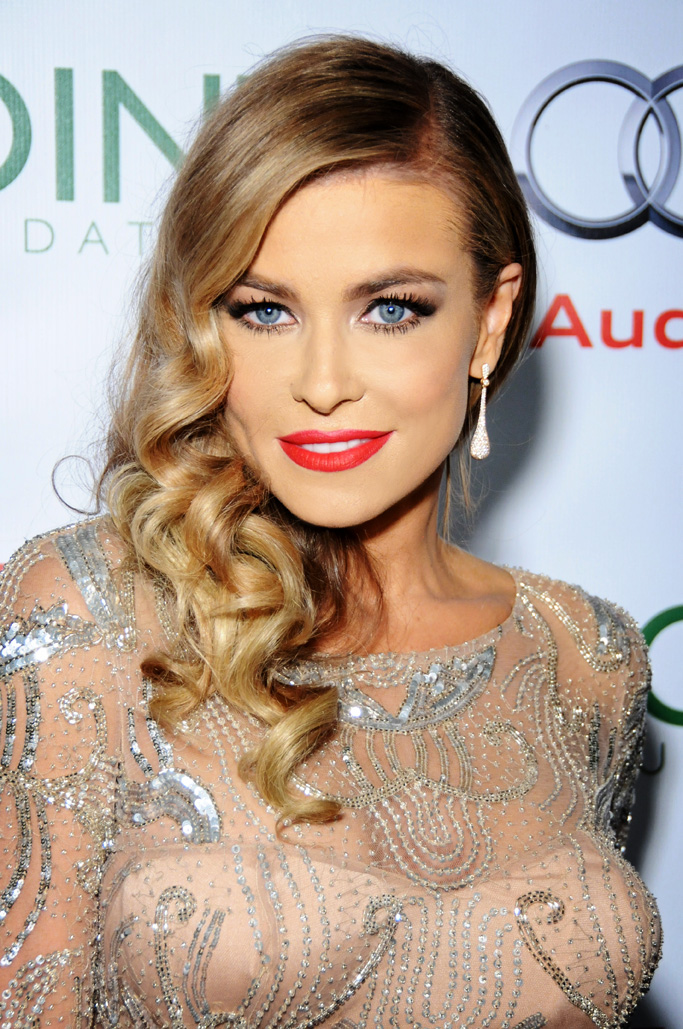
Baywatch actress Carmen Electra (formerly Tara Patrick)

Name	Known for	Relationship to SCPA	Citation
Andy Biersack	Founder and lead vocalist of American rock band Black Veil Brides; has done minor acting on the side	Former student	
Ron Bommer (Bohmer)	Broadway performer in Ragtime, The Woman in White, Les Misérables, Fiddler on the Roof, The Phantom of the Opera, and Sunset Boulevard	Graduate	
Barbara Britton	Dancer with New York City Ballet	Graduate	
Rebecca Budig	Emmy nominated TV actress in All My Children, and Guiding Light	Graduate	
Rocky (Roscoe) Carroll	Tony Award nominated Broadway performer in Piano Lesson, Emmy nominated TV actor in Roc, Chicago Hope, NCIS, and NCIS: Los Angeles	Graduate	
Mia Carruthers	Singer-songwriter, TV performer in Taking the Stage	Student	
Shamika Cotton	TV actress in The Wire	Graduate	
Iman Crosson	Actor, Obama impersonator, and Internet personality	Graduate	
Gabrielle Dennis	TV and Film actress in The Game, and Rosewood	Graduate	
Carmen Electra (Tara Leigh Patrick)	TV and movie actress in Baywatch, Scary Movie, Date Movie, Epic Movie, Meet the Spartans, and Disaster Movie	Former student	
George Evans	Jazz vocalist, and multi-award-nominated recording artist	Graduate	
DJ Fokis (Randy Ellis)	Hip hop turntablist and producer	Former student	
Stephen Geoffreys	Tony Award nominated Broadway performer for The Human Comedy, and movie actor in Fright Night	Graduate	
David Goldsmith	Writer, lyricist, and script consultant. Motown: The Musical (Broadway) Invisible Thread (off-Broadway, 2nd Stage Theatre), bookwriter/lyricist of Having It All (musical), lyricist of Imagine This, Beautiful People, and The Adventures of Pinocchio	Graduate	
James Graham	Psychologist	Graduate	
Justin Jeffre	Recording artist in 98 Degrees	Graduate	
Drew Lachey	Recording artist in 98 Degrees, TV performer in Dancing with the Stars	Graduate	
Nick Lachey	Recording artist in 98 Degrees, TV performer in Newlyweds: Nick and Jessica, and producer of Taking the Stage	Graduate	
Brandi Chavonne Massey	Professional Broadway Actress, Recording Artist	Graduate	
Todd Louiso	Film and TV actor in High Fidelity, Scent of a Woman, Apollo 13, The Rock, Jerry Maguire and numerous TV appearances; director of the film Love Liza	Graduate	
Sjohnna Bruce McCray	Winner of the Walt Whitman Award for Poetry Rapture (2015),	Graduate	
Sarah Jessica Parker	Emmy and Golden Globe Award winning TV and film actress in Sex and the City, The Family Stone, and Smart People	Former student	
Jeff Sams	TV and film actor in Soul Food, Waiting to Exhale, and numerous TV appearances	Graduate	
Brad Stenz	Recording artist in Moth	Graduate	
Cyrus Voris	Emmy nominated movie and TV screenwriter and producer of Bulletproof Monk, Kung Fu Panda, and Sleeper Cell	Graduate	
Madison Young	Award-winning adult film star and director	Graduate	
Donovan Zimmerman	Puppeteer and co-founder of Paperhand Puppet Intervention	Graduate	

== Principals ==
Year(s)	Principal	Previous position
1973	Lewis Harrison	Principal, Mount Adams Public School
1974	Gerald Dressman	Principal, Highlands Elementary School
1975–1991	William Dickinson	Music Teacher, Gamble Middle School
1991	Cecil Good (acting)	
1992–1997	Dr. Rosalyn England	Principal, Central VPA High School, St. Louis, Missouri
1997–2004	Jeff Brokamp	Principal, Crest Hills Year-Round School
2004		Mr. Lewis took over the role as Principal.
2004–2006	Clarence Crum	
2006–2007	Jonathan Carlisle	Assistant principal at the former Colonel White High School for the Arts, Dayton, Ohio
2007-2008	Kimberly S. Brown	Interim Principal- 2007-2008- Assistant Principal at Academy of World Languages (AWL)
2008–2010	Dr. Jonathan Futch	Assistant principal, Withrow High School, Cincinnati, Ohio
2010–2011	Anthony Flower	
2011–2015	Steve Brokamp	
2015–2026	Michael Owens	

== Artistic directors ==
Year(s)	Artistic Director	Previous position	Citation
1975–1992	Jack Louiso	Dance studio founder	
1993	John Farrell (acting)	Teacher, SCPA	
1993–1994	Stephan Berry (acting)	Band teacher, SCPA	
1994	Linda Krumme (acting)	Dance teacher, SCPA	
1995–1997	Stephan Berry	Band teacher, SCPA	
1997–2001	Steve Finn		
2001–2005	John Gardner	Head of music department, SCPA	
2005–2015	Dr. Isidore Rudnick	Music Department Coordinator at the University of Maine at Augusta	
2015–2022	Angela Powell-Walker		
2022-2025	Maggie Perrino		
2025- Present	James Jones		
