= School for Creative and Performing Arts =

- SCPA Logo

Location
- 108 W. Central Parkway; Cincinnati, Ohio; United States; 39°6′38″N 84°30′36″W

Information
- School type: Public; Magnet school; College-Preparatory; Fine Arts
- Motto: "Find Your Voice"
- Opened: 1973
- School district: Cincinnati Public Schools
- Principal: Michael Owens
- Grades: Kindergarten–12
- Enrollment: 1,296
- Campus: Urban
- Nickname: Raiders
- Website: www.scpa.cps-k12.org

The School for Creative and Performing Arts (SCPA) is a magnet arts school in Cincinnati in the US state of Ohio, and part of the Cincinnati Public Schools (CPS). SCPA was founded in 1973. Of the approximately 350 arts schools in the United States, SCPA is one of the oldest and has been cited as a model for both racial integration and for arts programs in over 100 cities.

SCPA had three different homes in its first four years, including a makeshift campus in the Mount Adams neighborhood and another in Roselawn. In 1976, it occupied the Old Woodward High School building, on the site of one of the oldest public schools in the country. In 2009–10, the school was featured in the MTV reality series Taking the Stage, filmed at the school and featuring SCPA students. A new facility in Over-the-Rhine was championed by the late Cincinnati Pops Maestro Erich Kunzel.

== History ==
=== Background ===
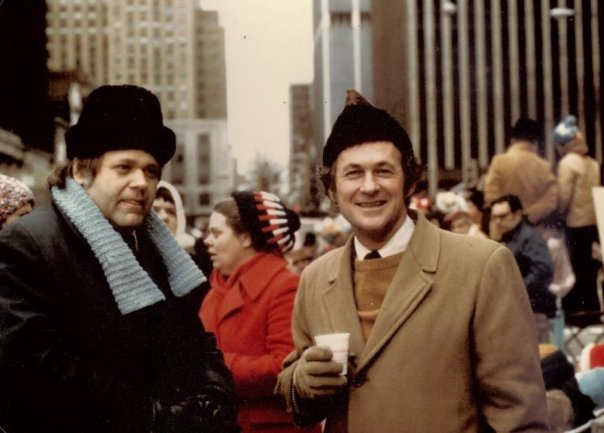
Bill Dickinson (left), who led the school from its founding in 1973 until 1991, and CPS Superintendent Dr. Donald Waldrip at an All-City Boy Choir performance on Cincinnati's Fountain Square, c. 1974

The School for Creative and Performing Arts arose, in part, as a response to the recurring desegregation battles in the Cincinnati Public Schools (CPS) in the late 1960s and early 1970s. In a 1965 civil rights suit, the city prevailed when a federal judge found that the schools were not intentionally segregated, but that "the racial composition of each school is simply a result of the racial composition of the neighborhoods which they serve". By 1971, Cincinnati's neighborhoods and schools had grown more segregated and the Supreme Court of the United States upheld forced busing as a remedy for school segregation in other cities. Desiring to avoid such drastic remedies for Cincinnati, newly appointed Superintendent Dr. Donald Waldrip pushed forward a program of alternative schools (later called magnet schools), designed "to calm the desires of parents for academic choice and to stem the demands of federal judges for court-ordered desegregation." The theory behind alternative schools was open enrollment: students could attend any alternative school they chose at no cost, so long as an even racial balance at the new school was maintained. So far as possible, students were admitted to these programs on a one white for one black basis. The School for Creative and Performing Arts was the first alternative school in what would become one of the largest and most robust magnet programs in the country.

In 1965, Robert McSpadden and Bill Dickinson, both music teachers in the Cincinnati Public Schools, founded the Cincinnati All-City Boy Choir, where they were struck by how the discipline they established for the boys in the choir carried over into their academic studies. They conceived the idea of a school where basic education was combined with intensive attention to children with artistic talents. With the support of Waldrip and Tom Murray, director for the west-central division of Cincinnati elementary schools, they pushed for $119,000 (~$639,765 in 2024) as part of a tax levy referendum in May 1973; the measure was defeated. The school was approved with a drastically reduced budget of $27,000 plus $9,850 from the Board of Education's general fund. They turned to private funding and won a $292,000 grant from J. Ralph Corbett, one of the city's foremost philanthropists for the arts, and $24,500 for a piano lab from the Baldwin Piano Company, which had manufactured pianos in Cincinnati since 1891.

The School for Creative and Performing Arts opened in August 1973, as the only grade four through six school for the performing arts in the country and the first public school that combined all of the arts in a single program. The curriculum included art, instrumental music, choral music, dance and drama, and was not organized strictly by grade, but permitted students to advance as soon as their abilities allowed. Murray explained:

Fourth through sixth grades will be together in classes. Teaching will often be done in teams. Art students will design scenery for plays, written by drama students. Music pupils will supply the music. They work together regardless of age. In reading classes they will read according to their own individual levels. A brilliant music student, capable of interpreting Beethoven's wildest dreams, might stumble on fifth level reading. This does not make him a dunce simply a slow reader.

=== Founding in Mount Adams (1973–1975) ===
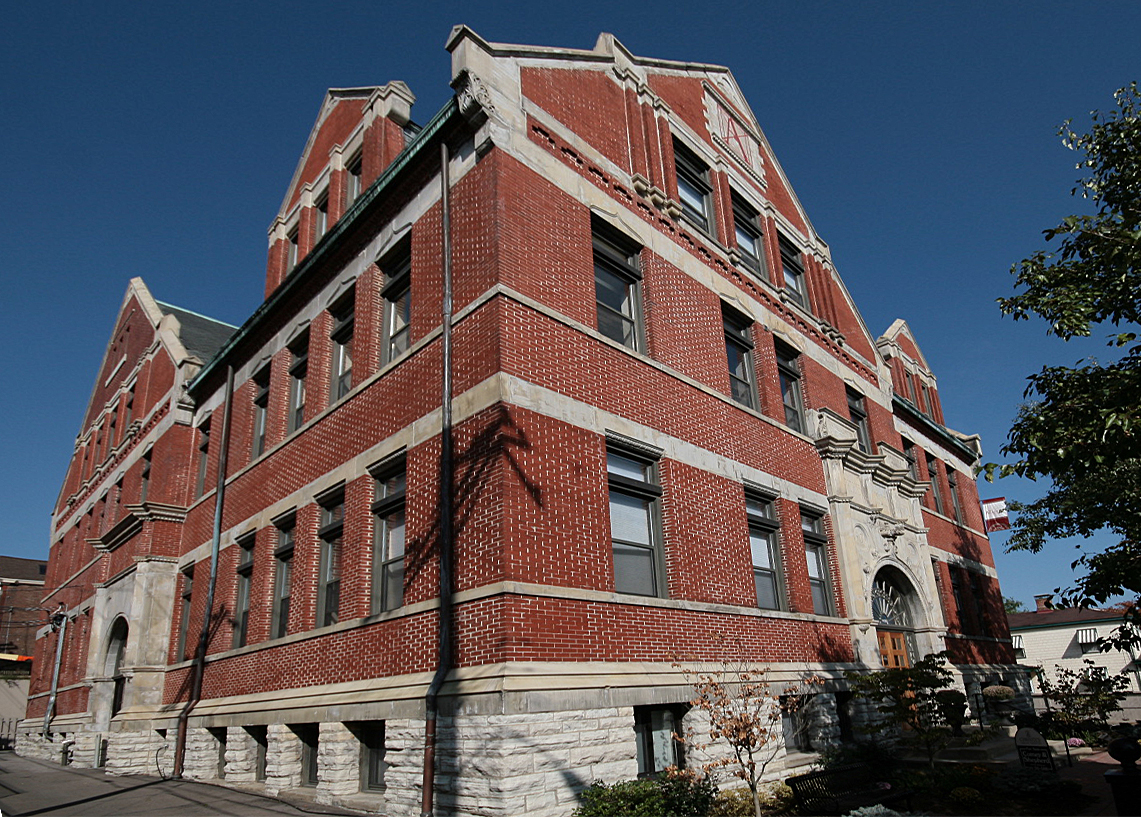
Mount Adams Public School, the first home of SCPA. The Romanesque Revival school house, built by Henry Siter in 1894, was added to the National Register of Historic Places in 1980.

Dickinson was named coordinator and six weeks later he, McSpadden, Murray and others had selected a staff, developed a program, recruited students, and moved into the Mount Adams Public School building at 1125 St. Gregory Street. Described by Cincinnati Magazine as "a quaint village of imaginative, arty residents, unusual shops and restaurants, and historic buildings" and overlooking downtown Cincinnati and the Ohio River, Mount Adams had been home to the Art Academy of Cincinnati (the museum school of the Cincinnati Art Museum) since 1887, and was a "mecca for students and teachers of art". The Mount Adams School was nearly defunct, with fewer than 80 students remaining. Fifty of those children, ranging from kindergarten (around age five) to third grade (around age eight) remained alongside the new SCPA. A dozen of the Mount Adams middle school students were accepted into the new program, along with the 140 other fourth through sixth grade pupils selected from schools around the city by audition.

By 1974, SCPA had 332 students, with 500 on the waiting list, and had overflowed into rented space in the surrounding neighborhood, including three rooms at the nearby Holy Cross School, two rooms at the community center two blocks away, and large room for drama above Mike's Meat Market across the street. Students practiced instruments in hallways and restrooms, and the library was in the middle of the second floor hall. Student productions were held in other schools around the city, and the first major musical, Babes in Toyland, was performed at Education Center downtown. With plans to expand to ninth grade (around age 14) and 540 students in 1975, and to twelfth grade (around age 17) and 1,400 students in 1977, a new facility had to be found. Waldrip proposed the school move to the Old Woodward school building, then home of Abigail Cutter Junior High School, in Over-the-Rhine, a predominantly African-American area near downtown. Neighborhood resistance was strong and opponents, arguing that "the school administration was trying to avoid problems of integration by moving an alternative school to Cutter and transferring Cutter students elsewhere", blocked the plan.

Councilwoman Bobbie Stern proposed the school move to Cincinnati Union Terminal, a National Historic Landmark which the Historic American Buildings Survey called "a unique and monumental manifestation of Art Deco architecture and interior decoration", noted for its mosaic murals depicting the history of Cincinnati and its rotunda, 106 feet (32 m) high and 110 feet (34 m) long, the largest semi-dome in the western hemisphere. The facility, vacant since it was abandoned by Amtrak in 1972, was to house the school, a maintenance facility for the Queen City Metro transit service, and a new rail terminal for Amtrak. The plan was approved in April 1975 and was due for completion for the 1976 school year.

=== Transition in Roselawn (1975–1976) ===
Temporary space was needed in the interim, and the school relocated its 550 fourth through ninth grade students to rented space in Roselawn, the epicenter of Cincinnati's Jewish Community. The school was divided between two buildings, the Yavneh Day School building at 1636 Summit Road and the nearby Jewish Community Center. The Yavneh Day school, founded in 1952 by parents who wanted to combine secular and Jewish education for their children, moved to Roselawn in 1958 but had outgrown that facility. The school had no lockers; students carried their belongings between buildings. Lunches were delivered from another school and served at a nearby church.

Dickinson became principal in 1975, and worked to fully integrate the arts into the academic program. "Academics don't end when art, drama or music classes begin," he said, "but blend, in an interdisciplinary approach to education." Music study included acoustics and the history and architecture of important musical periods; art history was part of the art curriculum and anatomy and physiology were studied in the dance program. The school was recognized with The Cincinnati Post's Corbett Award in 1976 as "the arts organization making an outstanding contribution to the community".

The Union Terminal project was derailed when the three prospective tenants failed to agree on how to share the space. Having outgrown its temporary facilities, SCPA was again forced to find a new home for the following year. After examining options including the historic Rockdale Temple and two schools slated to be closed in the city's West End, the school board once again settled on the Old Woodward building, over the objections of the community.

=== Old Woodward and national attention (1976–1990) ===
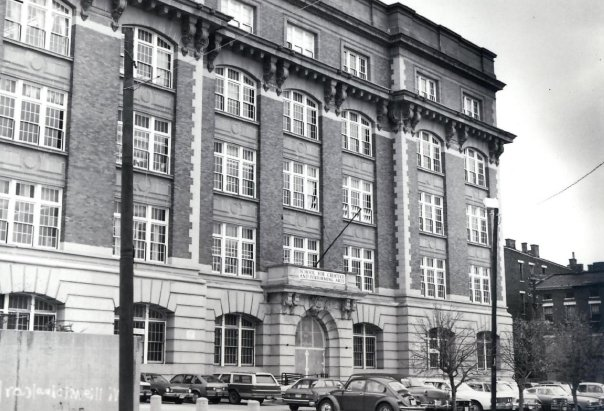
The Old Woodward building in 1976. The Renaissance Revival building is part of the Over-the-Rhine National Register Historic District.

SCPA's new home was in the heart of Pendleton district in Over-the-Rhine. One of the largest German-American neighborhoods in the United States in the 19th century and a famed entertainment district at that time, Over-the-Rhine had declined into an impoverished and crime-ridden enclave for migrant Appalachians in the 20th century. By 1970, a combination of white flight and the destruction of surrounding slums had transformed the area into Cincinnati's most infamous ghetto. It is one of the largest, most intact urban historic districts in the United States and the most dangerous neighborhood in Cincinnati. The school, with its 650 students, moved into this historic but blighted neighborhood, and its Old Woodward School building at 1310 Sycamore Street.

Woodward was one of the oldest public schools in the country, founded as the Woodward Free Grammar School in 1831; it was named for William Woodward, a local tanner who donated the land to provide, in his words, "facilities to educate the children of persons who could not afford the expense of private schooling". The building was replaced once in 1855, and again in 1907 when President William Howard Taft, who graduated from Woodward in 1874, laid the cornerstone of the current building; it opened in 1910. The site is linked to the Underground Railroad, an informal network of secret routes and safe houses used by 19th-century black slaves in the United States; Levi Coffin (known as "The President of the Underground Railroad") had a home there from 1856 to 1863. The five-story brick, stone, and terra cotta building is approximately 225,000 sq ft (20,900 m^{2}). Designed by Gustav Brach, it was considered "an architectural gem" in its time, with some of the most modern facilities of its day, including flush toilets, central heating, and two swimming pools. It is graced with 12 rare Rookwood Pottery drinking fountains from the early 1900s, gifts of the Art League, founded in 1895, which raised dues from students who would then vote on works of art to buy for the school. The building is part of the Over-the-Rhine National Register Historic District, which encompasses 362.5 acres (146.7 ha) of the original German community and adjoins the Sycamore – 13th Street Historic District, which reflects the significant architecture associated with middle and late 19th century Greek Revival, Queen Anne, and Italianate styles.

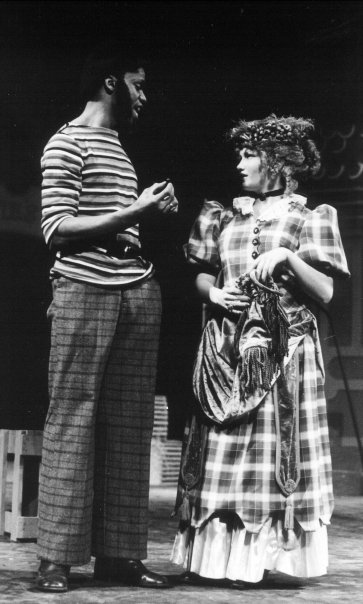
Chicago Hope and NCIS star Rocky Carroll appears in Carousel in 1980.

Woodward High School moved to a new facility in Bond Hill in 1953, and the building became Abigail Cutter Junior High School (also known as Cutter), named for William Woodward's wife. SCPA occupied the fourth floor in 1976, and the entire building in 1977, displacing the Cutter students to other public schools. It graduated its first class in 1979, becoming the first elementary through grade twelve arts program in the country. The first so-called "survivors", who began in fourth grade, graduated in 1982.

SCPA continued to attract national attention, and as a local TV special reported, "educators from all over the country flock[ed] to Cincinnati to see how, and why, it works." In 1981, SCPA was invited to perform The Wiz at the National Theatre in Washington, DC, the "Theatre of the Presidents" and oldest major touring house in the country, becoming the first non-professional group to perform there since it opened in 1835. SCPA student Roscoe (Rocky) Carroll won the 1981 National Endowment for the Arts Talent Search in drama and became a Presidential Scholar in the Arts. The school received the Blue Ribbon School of the United States Department of Education in 1984 and the National Secondary School Merit Award in 1985. By 1985, it had been credited as the model for arts schools in 100 cities in the US, Europe, and Asia, and had been cited in textbooks as a model of excellence in school integration.

The school relied heavily on donations, which made up over ten percent of the total budget. The Friends of SCPA (commonly known as The Friends), a nonprofit organization led by parents and members of the business and arts communities, had been a vital source of funding since the school's inception. In 1984, The Friends raised over $400,000 (~$1.02 million in 2024) to pay the salaries of the artistic director, technical director, costume designer, and dance, strings, and production teachers. In later years, The Friends raised up to $1 million each year through special events, corporate gifts and sponsorships, advertising sales, and other programs to support the artistic needs of the school including staff salaries, production expenses, scholarships for private lessons, and artists in residence.

=== Controversy and comeback (1991–2009) ===
Scandal erupted when principal Dickinson resigned in 1991, citing health reasons, while under investigation for alleged improper contact with students off school grounds; no charges were ever filed. He was succeeded by Dr. Rosalyn England, former principal of Central VPA High School in St. Louis. Controversy continued and between 1992 and 1995, two teachers confessed to having or attempting to have sex with students and two more were investigated for allegations of sexual misconduct. In 1992, open conflict with England led to the departure of original Artistic Director Jack Louiso, whom Dickinson had called "the 'life-blood' of the school's artistic endeavors". The artistic program would remain in upheaval; four more artistic directors would come and go under England. The controversies took a toll; applications suffered, teachers departed, financial support dwindled and the quality of the productions declined. By 1996, enrollment had fallen from nearly 1,200 to 956.

In April 1996, an arson fire destroyed the school's auditorium, causing over $1 million (~$1.84 million in 2024) of damage; it was a turning point for a school then dangerously close to closure. The culprit was never identified. Erich Kunzel, long time maestro of the Cincinnati Pops Orchestra and nationally renowned as "the Prince of Pops", announced his vision for a new SCPA campus near Cincinnati Music Hall, which would be part of an arts and education complex that would help revitalize Over-the-Rhine. A campaign was launched that, over the following 13 years, raised funds and made plans for the new facility.

England abruptly retired in 1997 and was replaced by Jeff Brokamp, who had been principal of the Crest Hills Year-Round School, which had won awards for its all-year curriculum. Brokamp, with no previous arts experience, began to turn the school around. A new emphasis on academics, more Advanced Placement courses and more stringent audition standards that admitted only the most dedicated students led to better test scores and a higher level of artistic talent; Brokamp pushed to expand the school's vocational training programs in photography, stage management, and costume design by 50 percent. Applications to audition more than tripled by 2001 and fund-raising rebounded.

Brokamp resigned and was replaced by Clarence Crum in 2004, who was followed by John Carlisle in 2006. Carlisle went on extended leave in October 2007, pending an investigation into the alleged rape of a former student off school grounds. Carlisle denied the accusation and no criminal charges were filed. He resigned in March 2008. According to Cincinnati Magazine, the "scandal launched rumors and confusion" and "the revolving door of school administrators" took a toll on faculty and student morale. Carlisle was replaced by Dr. Jonathan Futch, formerly Assistant Principal at Withrow High School.

=== Taking the Stage (2009–2010) ===
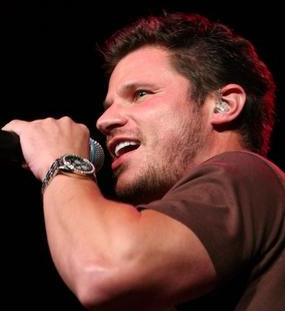
Nick Lachey of 98 Degrees, co-creator of Taking the Stage, performs in 2006

Taking the Stage, a "musical reality" TV series set at SCPA, premiered on MTV in March 2009. The series, co-created and co-produced by SCPA graduate Nick Lachey, was a dramatized depiction of life at the school. The show chronicled the lives of five real SCPA high school students and their friends in their careers at SCPA. Each episode featured original music and choreography by the students themselves, performed at the school and other locations in Over-the-Rhine.

The first season, which premiered on March 19, 2009, was the number one primetime cable telecast among females 12–24 years old and one of the top four among all viewers 12–34 years old. The second season began filming at the school in 2009, and first aired on January 16, 2010. The show was cut from one hour to 30 minutes and focused on new transfer students instead of current SCPA students, leading some students and parents to complain that the admission process had been compromised. The school denied the claim. It ran for 16 episodes, through April 15, 2010. In May 2010, MTV announced there would be no third season.

The school was paid $10,000 for each of the nine episodes in season one and twelve in season two. The show attracted international attention for the school and interest from prospective students around the world; applications for admission increased by 60 percent in 2009.

=== Washington Park (2010– ) ===
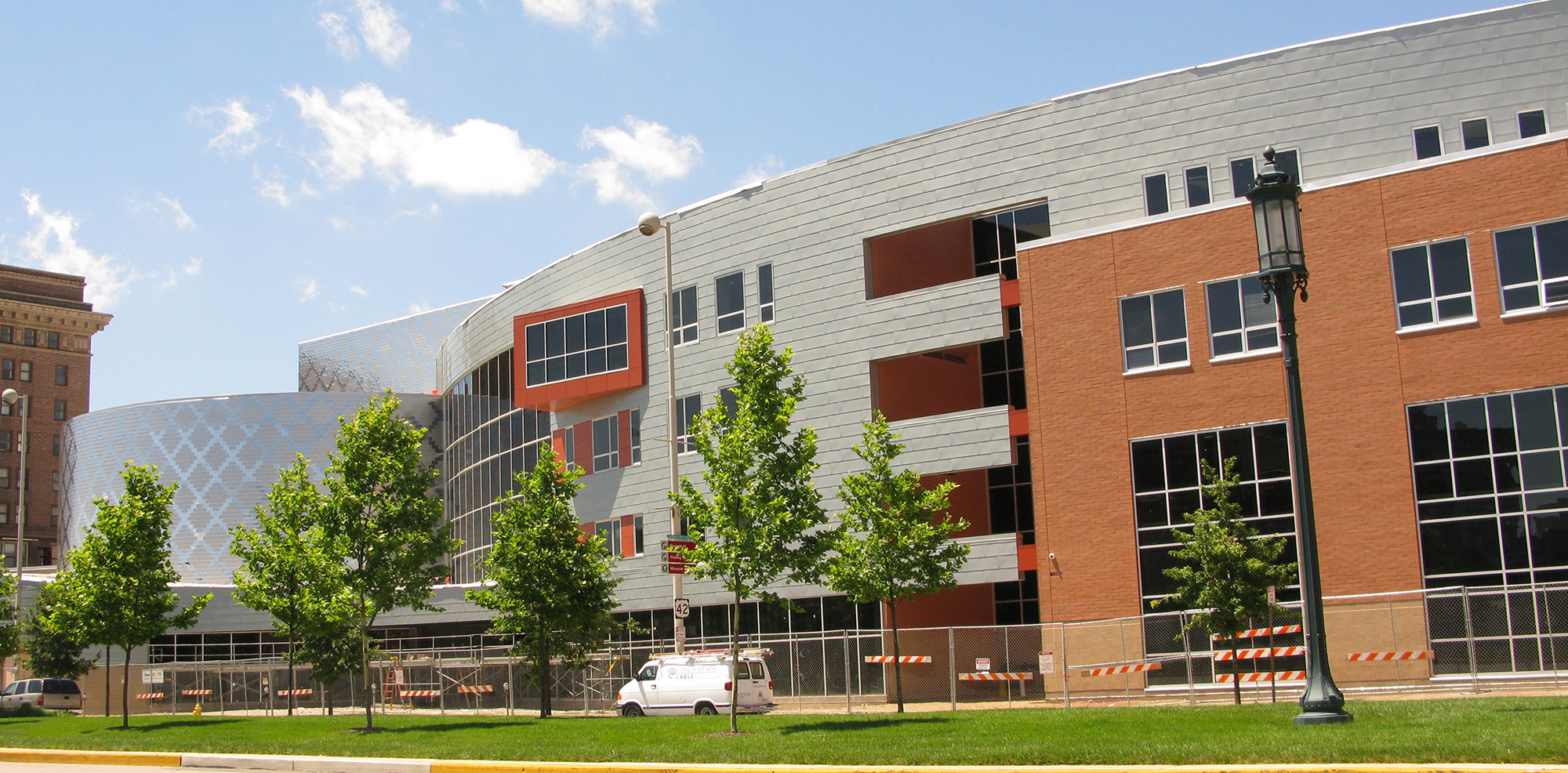
The Erich Kunzel Center for Arts and Education, the new home of SCPA, under construction in 2009.

In the aftermath of the 1996 fire, a group of local benefactors led by Kunzel formed the Greater Cincinnati Arts and Education Center (GCAEC) to, in Kunzel's words, "transform the area around Washington Park into a unique arts community that would include a new School for the Creative and Performing Arts." The GCAEC committed $31 million, the Cincinnati Public Schools $34 million, and the State of Ohio $7 million, to combine SCPA with the Schiel Primary School for Arts Enrichment in one building to create the first public kindergarten through twelfth grade arts school in what the GCAEC called the "nationally unprecedented public school system – private sector partnership".

Schiel, built in 1911 as an elementary school for the Corryville neighborhood, was converted to a Spanish-language magnet school in 1974 and again to an arts enrichment school in 1985. Schiel students have been admitted by open enrollment on a first-come-first-served basis. With 420 kindergarten through third grade students in 2008 (around ages five through nine), 83 percent of them black, 72 percent economically disadvantaged, it has been the primary feeder school for SCPA, for which Schiel students have been required to audition. Schiel was one of two CPS schools recognized as a Blue Ribbon School in 2010.

The construction plans faced opposition from those in the community who feared the project would displace the Drop Inn Center, the region's largest homeless shelter, and the design was revised to build around it. By 2007, after more than a decade of fund-raising and negotiations, 90 percent of the final $72 million (~$105 million in 2024) budget had been secured and ground was broken for a new building across from Washington Park in September of that year. The 5.75-acre (2.33 ha) park, reclaimed from old burial grounds between 1858 and 1863, is lined with trees and benches and features statues of Friedrich Hecker and Robert Latimer McCook, German-American heroes of the American Civil War. As Over-the-Rhine has declined, a significant homeless population has overtaken the area.

The new SCPA building is four blocks west of the Old Woodward building, in the heart of the arts community around Music Hall and Washington Park

The park faces Cincinnati Music Hall, home to the Cincinnati Symphony Orchestra, Cincinnati Opera, Cincinnati May Festival, and the Cincinnati Pops Orchestra. Designed by Samuel Hannaford, one of Cincinnati's most important architects, and built with private funds in 1878, it was added to the National Register of Historic Places in 1971, noting its "stunning composition in the High Victorian Gothic mode". It was listed as a National Historic Landmark in 1974. Memorial Hall, a Beaux Arts theater built by Hannaford in 1908, is immediately south of Music Hall, and was added to the National Register of Historic Places in 1978. Since 2005 the area has also been home to the Art Academy of Cincinnati, founded in 1869. Formerly aligned with the Cincinnati Art Museum, it became an independent college of design in 1998. Ensemble Theatre Cincinnati and Know Theater are also part of the rich cultural community that has developed around the park and Music Hall.

The combined school retains the name School for the Creative and Performing Arts. Private donors will have a significant and ongoing voice in how the school is operated. According to the Cincinnati Enquirer, the school board approved a plan in 2003 to allow the GCAEC to choose five of the twelve members of the Local School Decision-Making Committee (LSDMC), an independent body that provides oversight for the school, as a condition for continued fund-raising. This private sector oversight has been criticized by union leaders as excluding faculty and staff. The GCAEC began fundraising for an endowment in 2010, and as of 2010, had pledged to contribute at least $150,000 per year to the school.

No plans were announced for the Old Woodward building, but it was expected to remain vacant for years. An Ohio School Facilities Assessment in 2002 reported that it was "very attractive architecturally and merits any means required to preserve it", and that residential units would be the best use, but that a major redevelopment project, while attractive to private developers, would be prohibitively expensive. The area surrounding the old building has seen a resurgence in recent years including a public green space named Cutter Playground directly north of the building, currently home to the OTR Urban Kickball League. In November, 2012, the building was sold at auction to Core Redevelopment of Indianapolis for $1.3 million (~$1.75 million in 2024). It had been appraised at $8.5 million. The developer's plans for the building were not made clear at the time.

== Curriculum ==
=== Arts ===
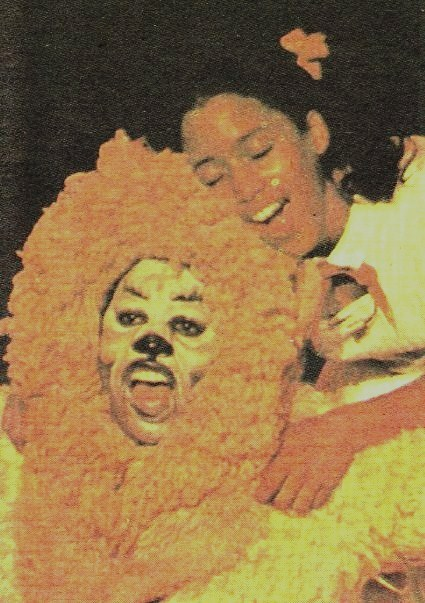
SCPA performance of The Wiz at the National Theatre in Washington, D.C. in 1981

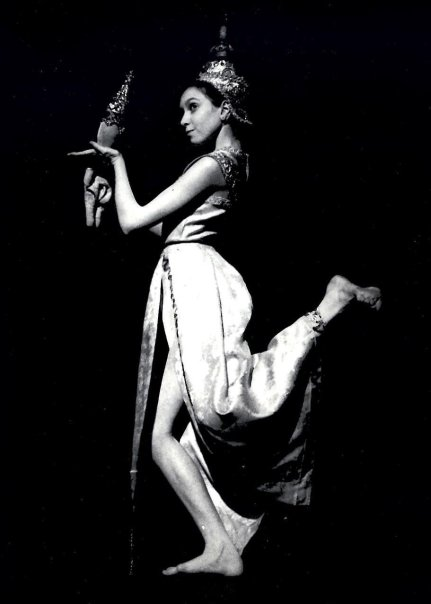
SCPA student performs "The Small House of Uncle Thomas" in The King and I in 1982

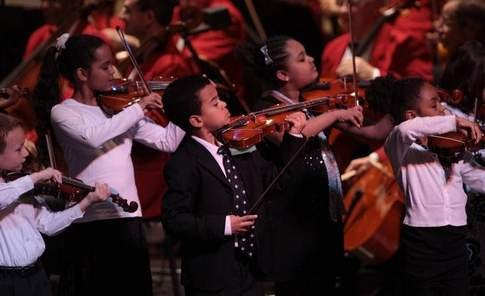
Suzuki strings students from the Schiel school perform with the Cincinnati Pops at the opening of the new building in 2010

The curriculum is designed to prepare students for professional careers in the arts. Each student concentrates in at least one major area: creative writing, dance, drama, music, stagecraft, and visual art. Younger students often concentrate in two or more. High school students are required to specialize and major only in the areas in which they have potential to do professional work. Advanced students study up to two hours each day in their major. Forty percent of the students stay at least two hours after school for rehearsals, private lessons, and productions.

The program stresses discipline and performance. There are no appreciation courses; the curriculum emphasizes that arts appreciation grows from practicing an art. The interrelation of the arts is also stressed. All students take at least one course in each major area. A dancer, for example, will be required to study visual art, drama, and music.

The visual arts program includes drawing, painting, photography, sculpting, digital art, and art history. The program is highly structured, emphasizing technique and control over free expression, which has attracted criticism from the local art community. Art students receive individualized instruction, participate in art exhibits and competitions, undertake commissioned work, and work at in-house galleries and off-site exhibits. Most art majors take Advanced Placement art courses by the end of their sophomore year, and many attend pre-college programs at major universities between their high school years.

The drama program stresses technique and performance; students must perform in public at least twice a year. There are three major dramatic productions each season, and high school students are required to compete in the English Speaking Union Shakespeare Contest. Advanced students audition for the Acting Ensemble Company, which provides a full season of performances in venues outside the school. The creative writing program focuses on writing as an art in journalism, script writing, poetry, and creative non-fiction. Students participate in writing competitions, internships, and develop portfolios to showcase their work.

The dance program was founded on the training principles of the "most famous dance schools of Europe", which emphasize body training. All dancers are required to study ballet, but may also learn modern dance, jazz, tap, and other forms of dance. There are nine levels of ballet, and students begin intensive training in fourth grade. Dance classes meet for at least two 45-minute periods every day; advanced students may train for three or more. Dance Ensemble, selected by audition, stages public performances throughout the year.

The instrumental music program offers specializations in orchestra, band, piano, jazz, percussion, and harp. Students major in an instrument and specialized training begins in grade four. Advanced students take private lessons, arranged by the school, and have master classes with guest instructors from the Cincinnati Symphony Orchestra. Vocal music students audition to perform in one of 13 vocal performance groups. High school students may audition for the most selective of these, "13th & Broadway", which performs throughout the region.

The technical theater program offers college-level training in stage management, lighting, sound, and set and costume design. Each specialty has a lab for students to develop concepts and practice technique, and students work side by side with professional trades people in their chosen field.

Student present to the faculty of their major department twice a year in a "proficiency review" to assess their progress. It is a learning experience for younger students, but students in grades 7–12 who fail to attain a passing rating are placed on probation and must pass their subsequent review to be allowed to continue in that major. Students must audition if they wish to change majors for the following year.

The highlight of the performance season is a major musical production which is an important source of revenue for the school. There are two ballets each year: The Nutcracker in the winter and a piece from repertoire in the spring. The technical and production aspects of performances are handled entirely by students, a level of responsibility the school claims is unusual even among arts schools. Strict racial balance is maintained in all school performances through "non-traditional casting", in which the race of each lead role alternates in each production.

SCPA students and faculty have performed with professional companies and in major venues including Carnegie Hall and the Kennedy Center. Students are selected to perform with every major local arts company, including the Cincinnati Opera, Cincinnati Playhouse in the Park, and the Cincinnati Ballet, and appear in local television programs and commercials. SCPA students have performed on PBS with the Cincinnati Pops and toured with Broadway productions including 42nd Street and The King and I. Students on tour continue their studies at "set school" and rejoin their classmates when they return.

SCPA students are encouraged to compete in arts competitions at all levels, including international contests like the World Piano Competition and the American High School Theater Festival in Edinburgh. Honors since 2008 have included first place in the Ohioana Robert Fox Award for Young Writers, a bronze medal at the Cincinnati World Piano Competition, top honors at the Days of International Choir Music Competition, and the 2008 Cincinnati Arts Association Overture Award in Visual Art.

=== Academics ===
Students are required to complete a standard CPS academic curriculum alongside their arts studies and the school day is 45 minutes longer than other Cincinnati public schools. SCPA ranks first in the district on standardized test scores at the elementary school level. At the high school level, only Walnut Hills High School, Cincinnati's selective public college preparatory magnet, ranks higher. In 2009, the graduation rate was 95.5 percent and the mean score on the ACT, a standardized college admissions test, was 23 (at the 69th percentile). On the Ohio Department of Education 2009–2010 School Year Report card, SCPA was designated "Effective" and Schiel was designated "Excellent." Ninety percent of graduating seniors continue on to college, and those students receive one of the highest levels of scholarship funding in the city. In 2007, the 98 graduating seniors received a combined $7.1 million in scholarships and SCPA averaged $72,449 per student, the third most of any public or private school in Cincinnati.

== Extracurricular activities ==
SCPA offers a limited range of sports and other activities compared to other CPS schools, as students are expected to commit significant after-school time to practice and performance. Volunteer community service opportunities are organized by the Positive School Culture committee and made available to students in every grade. Student Council is elected from each grade and raises funds for student activities. National Honor Society (for grades ten to twelve) and National Junior Honor Society (for grades seven through nine) are by invitation only to students who demonstrate outstanding achievement, service, leadership, and citizenship.

German, French, and Spanish clubs are open to all students and plan language-related activities. The Astronomy Club for Girls for fourth through sixth graders takes advantage of the nearby Cincinnati Observatory to explore astronomy. The Brain Bowl team, also for fourth through sixth graders, participates in academic competitions. Students Involved in Fostering Tolerance (SIFT) works to promote tolerance and diversity through awareness field trips and fundraisers.

Student publications include the yearbook, 1310 Address of the Arts, a monthly newspaper published by the Creative Writing department, but open to contributions by all students, and Pandora's Backpages, a full-color magazine featuring creative writing, visual art and musical compositions by students, faculty, and alumni.

The school competes athletically in Cincinnati's Independent conference in boys' and girls' basketball, boys' baseball, and girls' softball. Intramural sports are open to all high school students.

== Campus ==
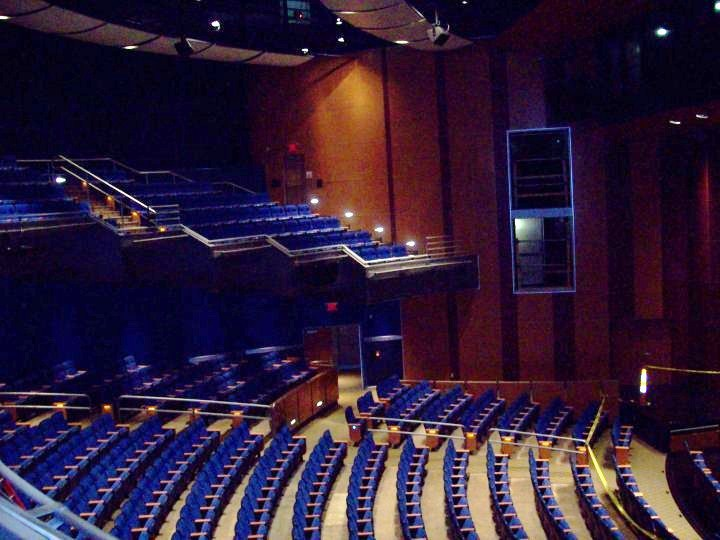
The Corbett Theater, called the "jewel of the project" by lead architect Curtis Moody. It is named for Cincinnati's most important benefactors of the arts, J. Ralph and Patricia Corbett, whose $2.6 million lead donation was instrumental in building the new school.

The new building, called the Erich Kunzel Center for Arts and Education, opened for 1,350 students in August, 2010. The $72 million facility, bordered by Elm, Race, and 12th streets and facing Central Parkway, was designed by Moody Nolan, a large minority-owned architectural firm known for its numerous design awards, and is the largest development project in Over-the-Rhine since Music Hall. Civic leaders have called construction of the school "key to renovation of Over-the-Rhine" and development plans for the area include the renovation of Music Hall, a new parking garage and public plaza nearby, and a major expansion of Washington Park.

A reflective stainless steel panel with a diapering pattern curves around the L-shaped building and an "urban curve" of zinc wraps the main theater at the front of the building, contrasting with the brick walls of the school, the design and materials of which reflect those used in the building's neighborhood. The box office is a red, smokestack-shaped structure that projects a beam of light up into the sky. The four-story, disabled accessible building of 250,000 sq ft (23,000 m^{2}) combines arts and academic spaces on each floor, arranged by grade, with the youngest students on the lowest floor. The main entrance features student sculptures selected by contest. An "Avenue of the Arts", with gallery space for more student artwork, links the 750-seat main Corbett Theater, the 350-seat Mayerson Theater, and a 120-seat black box theater. The Corbett Theater has an 80-foot-high (24 m) stage, a hydraulically operated orchestra pit, and is acoustically isolated from the rest of the building. An outdoor amphitheater is also planned.

The music facilities include rooms for band, orchestra, jazz ensemble, and vocal music, along with a music library, a grand piano studio, and twelve soundproof practice rooms. Other arts-specific spaces include specialized drama rooms, four rooms for painting and sculpture, and a photography studio with adjoining darkroom. The technical theater facilities include labs for lighting and sound engineering, as well as costume, scenery, and stage prop shops. The main 5,500 sq ft (510 m^{2}) gymnasium is augmented by a fitness center and six multipurpose spaces for gym and dance. Academic facilities include four project labs, two chemistry rooms, two biology rooms, and a 4,300 sq ft (400 m^{2}) library, with 45 academic classrooms designed around flexible "extended learning areas" where students from different classes can study in groups.

== People ==
SCPA has produced notable graduates in a wide range of artistic fields. Alumni include Cyrus Voris, producer of Bulletproof Monk, Kung Fu Panda, Robin Hood and the Emmy-nominated miniseries Sleeper Cell and Todd Louiso, director of Love Liza and actor in Apollo 13, High Fidelity and other films. Andy Biersack, lead vocalist of Black Veil Brides also attended this school.

Emmy- and Golden Globe-winning Sex and the City star Sarah Jessica Parker attended SCPA in 4th and 5th grades before leaving to return to her former school, Clifton School. Four-time Emmy nominee Rebecca Budig of soap opera Guiding Light also attended SCPA, as did Emmy-nominated Chicago Hope and NCIS star Rocky Carroll, film and TV actor Jeff Sams, and Baywatch actress Carmen Electra. Nick Lachey, Drew Lachey, and Justin Jeffre of the multi-platinum album group 98 Degrees graduated from SCPA, as did Canadian Jazz Vocalist of the Year nominee George Evans, Broadway star Ron Bohmer, and actor/Obama impressionist Iman Crosson.

== Notes ==
a: By 1976, there were 16 different programs in 41 locations. The city was not successful in avoiding civil rights litigation. In 1974, the National Association for the Advancement of Colored People filed suit demanding an end to segregated schooling in Cincinnati. The settlement, reached in 1984, was, the court reported, "historic in allowing the school district charged with promoting or allowing unconstitutional desegregation to choose for itself the means to arrive at desegregation goals." Namely, the magnet school system, which was to operate under federal court supervision until 1991.
b: New York City had established the High School of Music and Art in 1936 and the High School of Performing Arts (for dance and drama) in 1948. They were combined in 1984 as the Fiorello H. LaGuardia High School of Music & Art and Performing Arts.
c: As part of school tradition, graduating seniors walk outside around the building as part of the Class Day ceremony on their final day at SCPA to commemorate this daily trek.
d: Plans for Kunzel's original vision of an entire arts complex anchored by Music Hall were scaled back due to lack of funding.

== Works cited ==
- Borman, Kathryn M.; Spring, Joel H. (1984). Schools in Central Cities: Structure and Process. New York: Longman. ISBN 0-582-28405-8.
- Cromwell, David; North, Rob (writers and producers) (1982). Dare to be Different (Television production). Cincinnati, OH: WKRC-TV Taft Broadcasting.
- Fine, John S.; Krome, Fredric (2007). Jews of Cincinnati. Images of America. Charleston, S.C.: Arcadia. ISBN 978-0-7385-5106-7.
- Griffin, Virginia K. Chapter 4: Desegregation in Cincinnati: The Legal Background. In Levine & Havighurst 1977.
- Jacobs, James N; Felix, Joseph L. Chapter 6: Issues in Implementing and Evaluating Alternative Programs in Cincinnati. p. 110. In Levine & Havighurst 1977.
- Levine, Daniel U.; Havighurst, Robert J., eds. (1977). The Future of Big City Schools: Desegregation Policies and Magnet Alternatives. Series on Contemporary Educational Issues. Berkeley, CA: McCutchan Publishing. ISBN 0-8211-1113-2.
- Miller, Zane L; Tucker, Edward Bruce (1998). Changing Plans for America's Inner Cities: Cincinnati's Over-The-Rhine and Twentieth-Century Urbanism. Urban Life and Urban Landscape Series. Columbus: Ohio State University Press. ISBN 0-8142-0762-6.
- "2007–08 Student Handbook" (PDF). School for Creative and Performing Arts. 2007. Archived from the original (PDF) on May 9, 2010.
- "2009–10 Student Handbook" (PDF). School for Creative and Performing Arts. 2009. Archived from the original (PDF) on March 31, 2022.
- Vaccariello, Linda; Pyle, Albert (October 1993). "Drama School". Cincinnati Magazine. Vol. 27, no. 1. pp. 99–107.
- Vaccariello, Linda (November 1997). "Turnaround at the SCPA". Cincinnati Magazine. Vol. 31, no. 2. pp. 77–80.
- Waldrip, Donald R. (April 1976). "Alternative Schools: Schools to Rescue Cities as Well as Kids". Cincinnati Magazine. Vol. 9, no. 7.
- Waldrip, Donald R. (1979). "The Cincinnati Alternative Schools". The Cincinnati Historical Society Bulletin. 38: 129–135. ISSN 0194-2883.
