= South Fairmount, Cincinnati =

Coordinates: 39°07′33″N 84°33′10″W

South Fairmount
- Neighborhood of Cincinnati
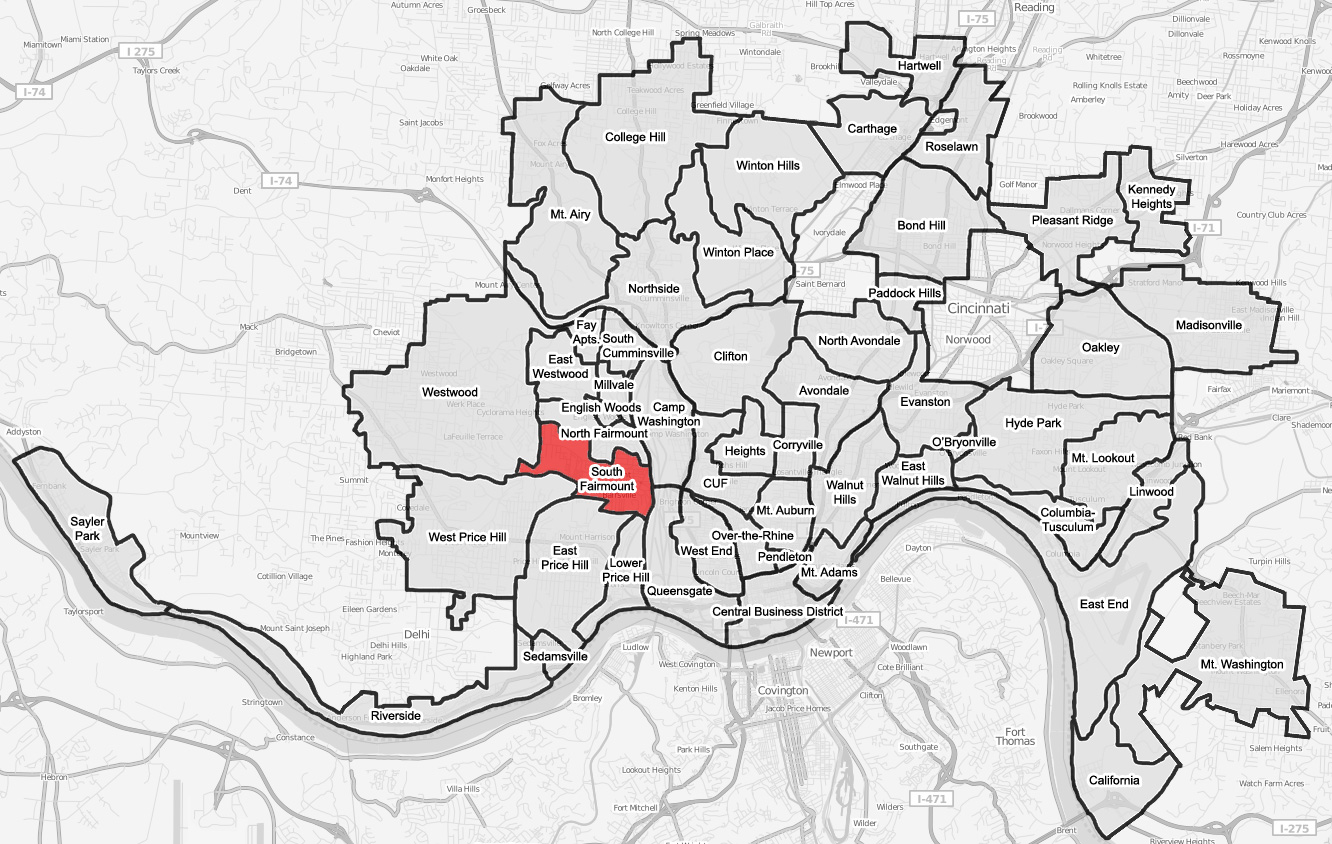
- South Fairmount (red) within Cincinnati, Ohio.
- Country: United States
- State: Ohio
- City: Cincinnati

Population (2020)
  - Total: 2,181
- Time zone: UTC-5 (EST)
  - Summer (DST): UTC-4 (EDT)
- ZIP code: 45214

South Fairmount is one of the 52 neighborhoods of Cincinnati, Ohio. Located in the western part of the city, it contains one of the highest concentrations of Section 8 housing in Hamilton County. The population was 2,181 at the 2020 census.

== History ==
Fairmount began as a sprinkling of farm homes in the early 1800s. Later as the Mill Creek valley became industrialized, the creek bed was spanned and factories were located at the base of the hill. The first newcomers were a few French and German immigrants.

In the 1920s, Fairmount developed distinct neighborhoods: North Fairmount, South Fairmount, Millvale, and English Woods.

In the late 19th century at least 2 breweries were in operation, Herancourt Brewery (est.1847) and Fairmount Brewing Company (est.1885). However, both closed due to prohibition in 1919. Around this time, more Italian families moved into the area. During this period the neighborhood gained the nickname "Cincinnati's little Italy". San Antonio Italian Church inspired the creation of LaRosa's, a regional pizza chain founded in 1954.

The neighborhood housed Lunkenheimer Valve Co., from the late 19th century until it closed in 1968. The factory produced parts for ships, steam locomotives and aircraft, and employed 2,000 at its height in the 1950s. One notable component was used in Charles Lindberg's Spirit of St. Louis airplane. The abandoned industrial site was designated a national historical site in January 2026.

Italian families started to move westward as suburbs developed in the 1950s and by the 1970s most had left. The population was around 6,000 in 1970, but dropped to 3,250 by 2000. Between 2006 and 2013, 236 homes were sold in foreclosure sales, nearly 18 percent of the available housing.

In 2021, the Metropolitan Sewer District of Greater Cincinnati (MSD) completed a stream daylighting project to restore the Lick Run and build an accompanying greenspace costing $100 million(See Infrastructure).

== Geography ==
South Fairmount borders the following neighborhoods: Camp Washington, East Price Hill, Lower Price Hill, North Fairmount, Queensgate, West Price Hill, and Westwood.

== Demographics ==
Population of South Fairmount 1980-2020
Year	Pop.	±%
1980	4,104	—
1990	3,998	−2.6%
2000	3,251	−18.7%
2010	2,368	−27.2%
2020	2,181	−7.9%

As of the census of 2020, there were 2,181 people living in the neighborhood. There were 1,096 housing units. The racial makeup of the neighborhood was 33.2% White, 58.8% Black or African American, 0.0% Native American, 0.3% Asian, 0.0% Pacific Islander, 3.5% from some other race, and 4.3% from two or more races. 4.9% of the population were Hispanic or Latino of any race.

There were 853 households, of which 36.1% were families. About 58.3% of all households were made up of individuals.

19.4% of the neighborhood's population were under the age of 18, 71.3% were 18 to 64, and 9.3% were 65 years of age or older. 49.1% of the population were male and 50.9% were female.

According to the U.S. Census American Community Survey, for the period 2016-2020 the estimated median annual income for a household in the neighborhood was $19,343. About 26.3% of family households were living below the poverty line. About 16.0% of adults had a bachelor's degree or higher.

== Infrastructure ==
=== Lick Run Greenway ===
In 2021, the Metropolitan Sewer District of Greater Cincinnati (MSD) completed a stream daylighting project to restore the Lick Run which used to flow between Queen City Avenue and Westwood Avenue. MSD was required to remove 85% of the annual 14 billion gallons of the combined sewer overflows (CSOs) that entered the local rivers and streams due to outdated sewer systems. The largest contributor to the overflows was CSO 5 in the Lick Run Watershed which dumped 1.7 billion gallons of raw sewage into the Mill Creek annually. By separating the storm water from the sanitary sewage most of the rain water can be sent straight into a creek, thus alleviating the watershed from CSOs.

After completion, MSD claimed that the Lick Run Greenway has eliminated 800 million gallons of CSO annually from entering the Mill creek. In all, the greenway, which began in 2013, consisted of 12 projects in which 4 were green infrastructure and the remaining 8 were storm sewers. As of 2021, MSD claimed that there were at least 9 new species of fish in the creek, including small mouth bass. The project also provides amenities such as basketball courts, a playground, water spray park, two shelters, an uncovered event stage, 1.5 miles of Walking/bike paths and the Lick Run Heritage Trail.

The Lick Run Greenway cost around $103 million to complete. Some community opposition was raised before it was completed in which residents likening it to an "open drainage ditch" and were concerned about the existing businesses and building stock.

There was also an alternative "grey" solution that they did not end up building that would have consisted of constructing a new 25-foot diameter tunnel to replace the 19.5-foot tunnel that was in place. This alternative would not have separated the storm water from the sanitary sewage so MSD would have been responsible for treating the storm water as if it was sewage. This alternative could have cost about $312 million.
