= North Fairmount, Cincinnati =

Coordinates: 39°08′08″N 84°33′23″W

North Fairmount
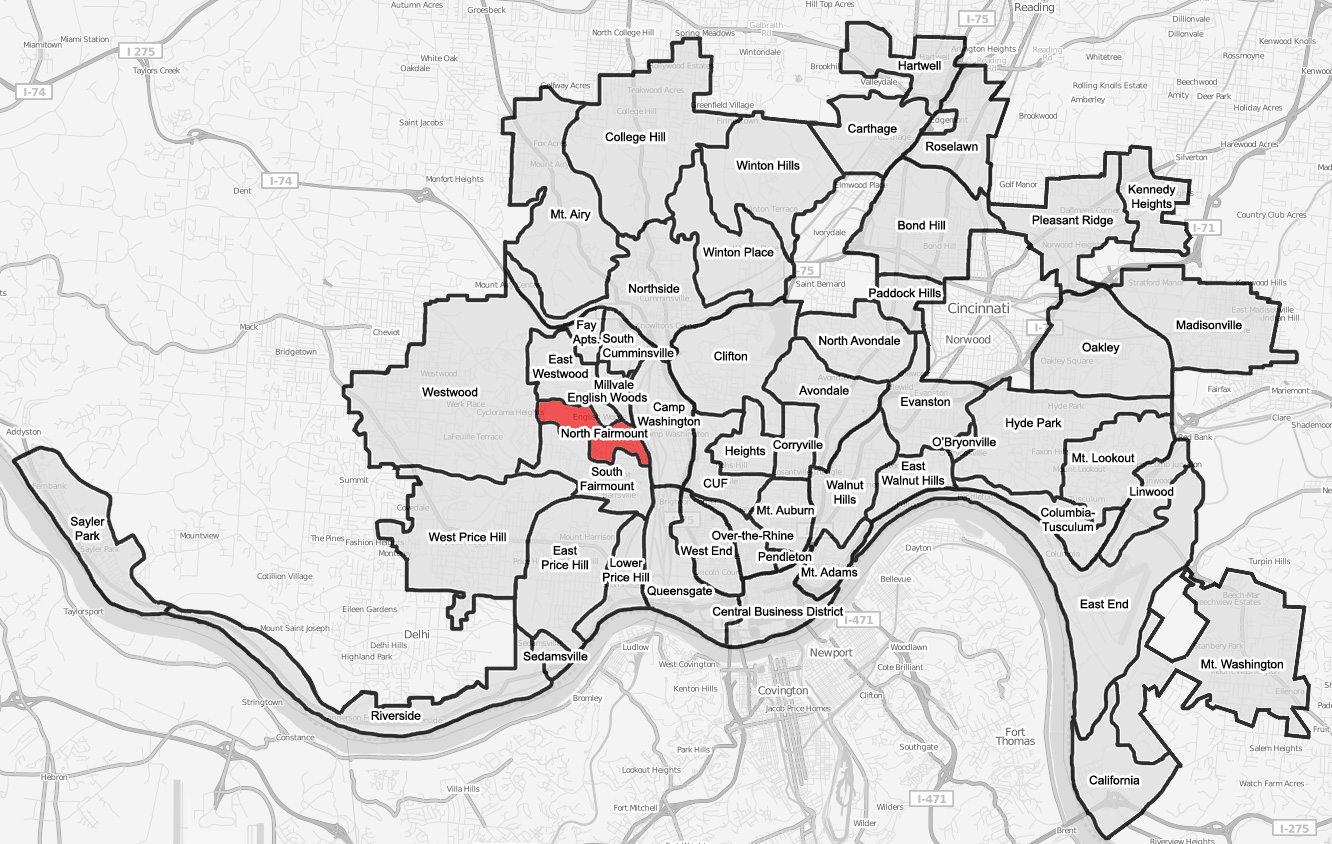
- North Fairmount (red) within Cincinnati, Ohio.
- Country: United States
- State: Ohio
- City: Cincinnati

Population (2020)
  - Total: 1,590

North Fairmount is one of the 52 neighborhoods of Cincinnati, Ohio. The neighborhood lies south of East Westwood, southwest of Millvale, and north of South Fairmount. The population was 1,590 at the 2020 census.

== History ==
Fairmount began as a sprinkling of farm homes in the early 1800s. Later as the Mill Creek valley became industrialized, the creek bed was spanned and factories were located at the base of the hill. A brewery was established as early as 1825, and several more beer makers arrived in the next decades. The first newcomers were a few French and German immigrants. The community attracted Italians near the turn of the century. Fairmount developed distinct neighborhoods, including North Fairmount, South Fairmount, Millvale (in northeast Fairmount), and English Woods (an early federal housing project).

== Demographics ==
Population of North Fairmount 1990-2020
Year	Pop.	±%
1990	5,334	—
2000	4,510	−15.4%
2010	1,812	−59.8%
2020	1,590	−12.3%
In 1990 and 2000, English Woods was included as part of population count.

As of the census of 2020, there were 1,590 people living in the neighborhood. There were 737 housing units. The racial makeup of the neighborhood was 17.2% White, 74.3% Black or African American, 0.2% Native American, 0.3% Asian, 0.0% Pacific Islander, 3.9% from some other race, and 4.2% from two or more races. 4.2% of the population were Hispanic or Latino of any race.

There were 709 households, out of which 54.7% were families. 41.7% of all households were made up of individuals.

26.4% of the neighborhood's population were under the age of 18, 63.7% were 18 to 64, and 9.9% were 65 years of age or older. 52.6% of the population were male and 47.4% were female.

According to the U.S. Census American Community Survey, for the period 2016-2020 the estimated median annual income for a household in the neighborhood was $33,882. About 25.5% of family households were living below the poverty line. About 16.6% of adults had a bachelor's degree or higher.
