= Paddock Hills, Cincinnati =

Coordinates: 39°10′0″N 84°28′30″W

Paddock Hills
- Neighborhood of Cincinnati
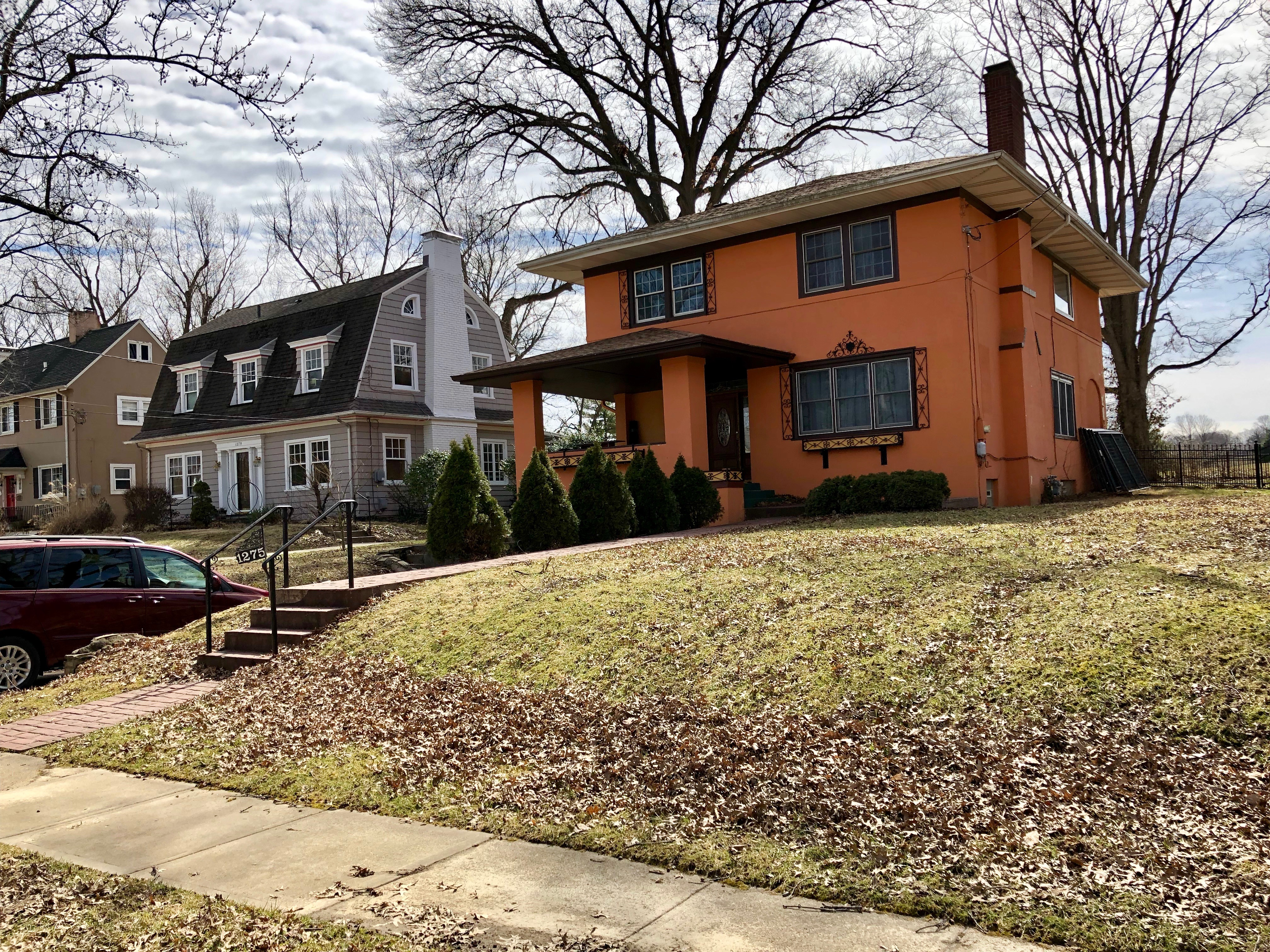
- Houses along Paddock Hills Avenue, Paddock Hills, Cincinnati, OH

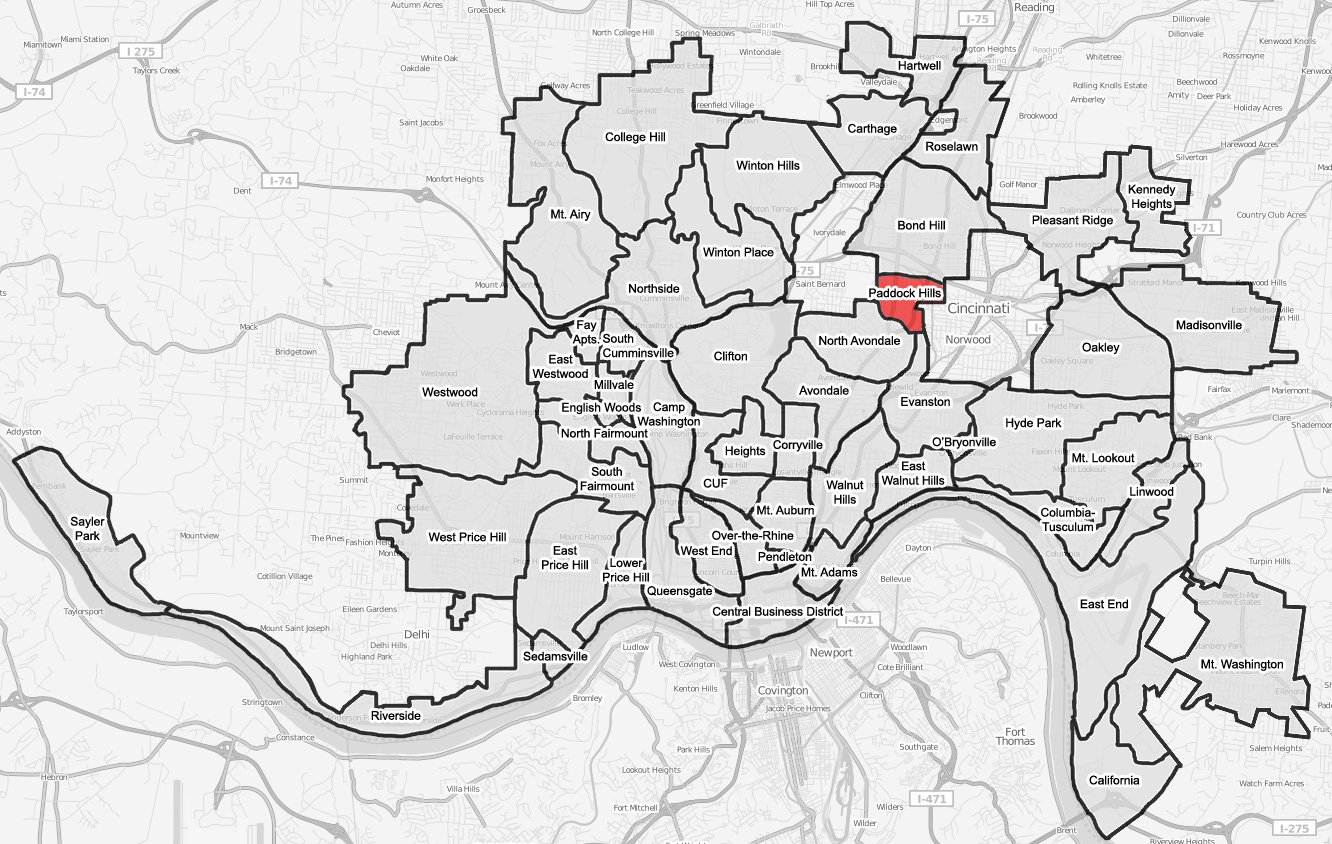
- Paddock Hills (red) within Cincinnati, Ohio
- Country: United States
- State: Ohio
- County: Hamilton
- City: Cincinnati

Population (2020)
  - Total: 1,038

Paddock Hills is one of the 52 neighborhoods of Cincinnati, Ohio. The population was 1,038 at the 2020 census.

The neighborhood is noted for its stock of Dutch Colonial Revival architecture, Tudor Revival architecture and bungalow houses.

== Demographics ==
As of the census of 2020, there were 1,038 people living in the neighborhood. There were 547 housing units. The racial makeup of the neighborhood was 34.2% White, 56.4% Black or African American, 0.0% Native American, 2.3% Asian, 0.0% Pacific Islander, 1.3% from some other race, and 5.9% from two or more races. 1.1% of the population were Hispanic or Latino of any race.

There were 448 households, out of which 53.3% were families. 38.4% of all households were made up of individuals.

19.3% of the neighborhood's population were under the age of 18, 69.6% were 18 to 64, and 11.1% were 65 years of age or older. 52.6% of the population were male and 47.4% were female.

According to the U.S. Census American Community Survey, for the period 2016-2020 the estimated median annual income for a household in the neighborhood was $34,079. About 0.0% of family households were living below the poverty line. About 28.6% of adults had a bachelor's degree or higher.
