= English Woods, Cincinnati =

Coordinates: 39°08′16″N 84°33′09″W

English Woods
- Neighborhood of Cincinnati
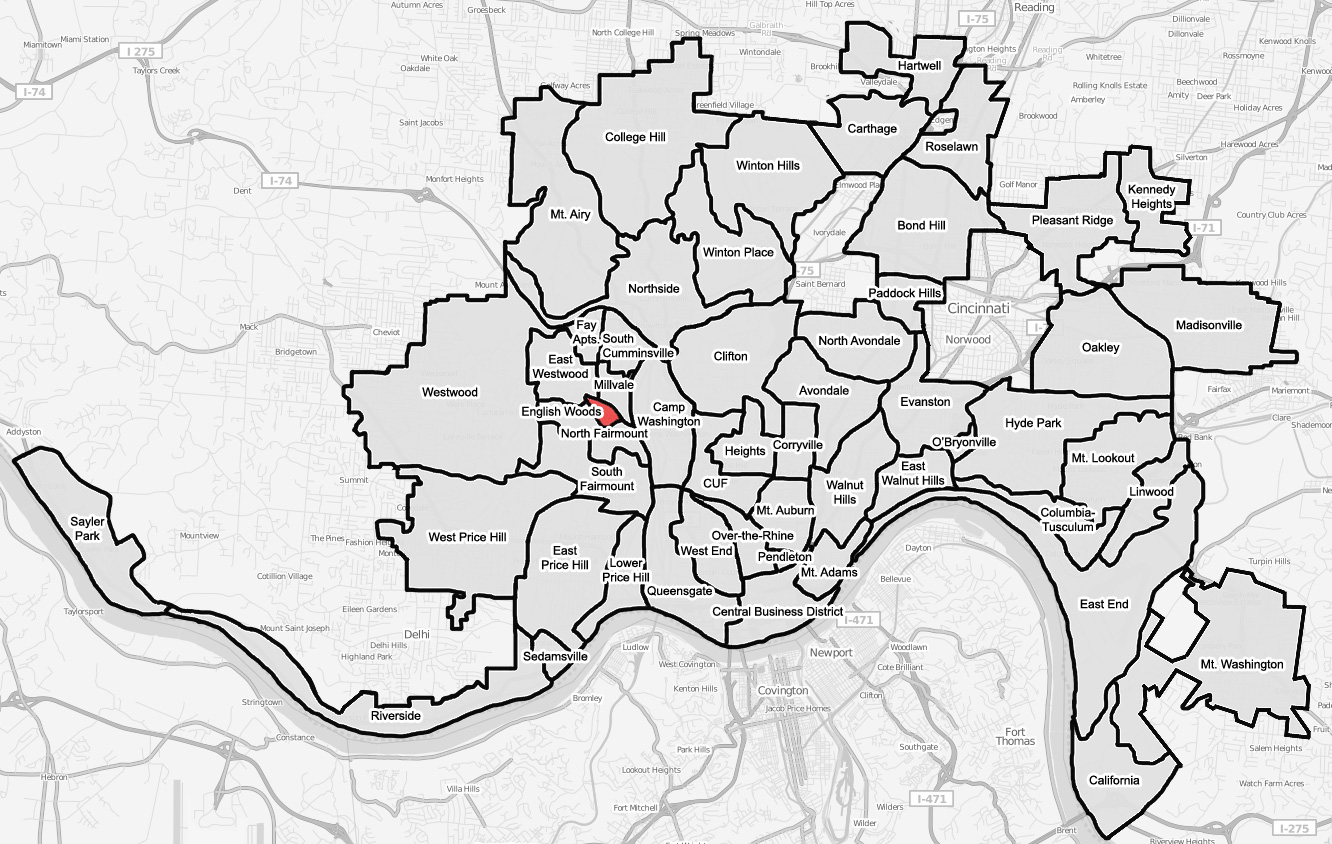
- English Woods (red) within Cincinnati, Ohio.
- Country: United States
- State: Ohio
- City: Cincinnati

Population (2020)
  - Total: 361
- Time zone: UTC-5 (EST)
  - Summer (DST): UTC-4 (EDT)
- ZIP code: 45225

English Woods is one of the 52 neighborhoods of Cincinnati, Ohio. Owned by the Cincinnati Metropolitan Housing Authority, the neighborhood originally consisted of housing projects built in 1940 and 1960, but the majority of the projects were demolished in 2005. The population was 361 at the 2020 census.

== History ==
In 1940, the Cincinnati Metropolitan Housing Authority (CMHA) established English Woods as a planned housing project. The establishment of the neighborhood was born out of local reformers' push to address the city's housing shortage in the late nineteenth and early twentieth century, with organizations such as the Better Housing League arguing that the shortage caused Cincinnati's urban core to deteriorate into slums. With financial support from the federal government due to the Housing Act of 1937, the CMHA opted for a two-pronged approach to the housing crisis, coupling the construction of public housing with the future clearance of neighborhoods the government considered slums. Because the CMHA's housing projects were racially segregated, after the construction of the city's first housing projects in the predominately black neighborhood of the West End, the CMHA sought to build their next projects as white-only communities in predominately white neighborhoods. Constructed along with Winton Terrace in Winton Place, English Woods's site was chosen due to its location in the predominately white neighborhood of North Fairmount. The projects opened in 1942, with the CMHA naming the neighborhood after David English, a local early settler.

The neighborhood expanded in 1960 with the construction of another public housing project known as Sutterview. That same decade, English Woods was desegregated after years of activism from local groups and leaders such as Ted Berry and the NAACP. In 2005, the CMHA demolished the original housing projects. Plans to redevelop English Woods by the CMHA in the subsequent decade were not enacted, leaving the majority of the neighborhood abandoned except for Sutterview and one high-rise apartment building.

== Demographics ==
Population of 1990-2020
Year	Pop.	±%
1990	5,334	—
2000	4,510	−15.4%
2010	405	−91.0%
2020	361	−10.9%

As of the census of 2020, there were 361 people living in the neighborhood. There were 242 housing units. The racial makeup of the neighborhood was 7.8% White, 87.3% Black or African American, 1.1% Native American, 0.0% Asian, 0.6% Pacific Islander, 0.8% from some other race, and 2.5% from two or more races. 3.3% of the population were Hispanic or Latino of any race.

There were 251 households, out of which 31.1% were families. 68.9% of all households were made up of individuals.

51.0% of the neighborhood's population were under the age of 18, 49.0% were 18 to 64, and 0.0% were 65 years of age or older. 39.6% of the population were male and 60.4% were female.

According to the U.S. Census American Community Survey, for the period 2016-2020 the estimated median annual income for a household in the neighborhood was $14,309. About 80.8% of family households were living below the poverty line. About 8.0% had a bachelor's degree or higher.
