= Carthage, Cincinnati =

Coordinates: 39°11′45″N 84°29′0″W

Carthage
- Neighborhood of Cincinnati
- Flag

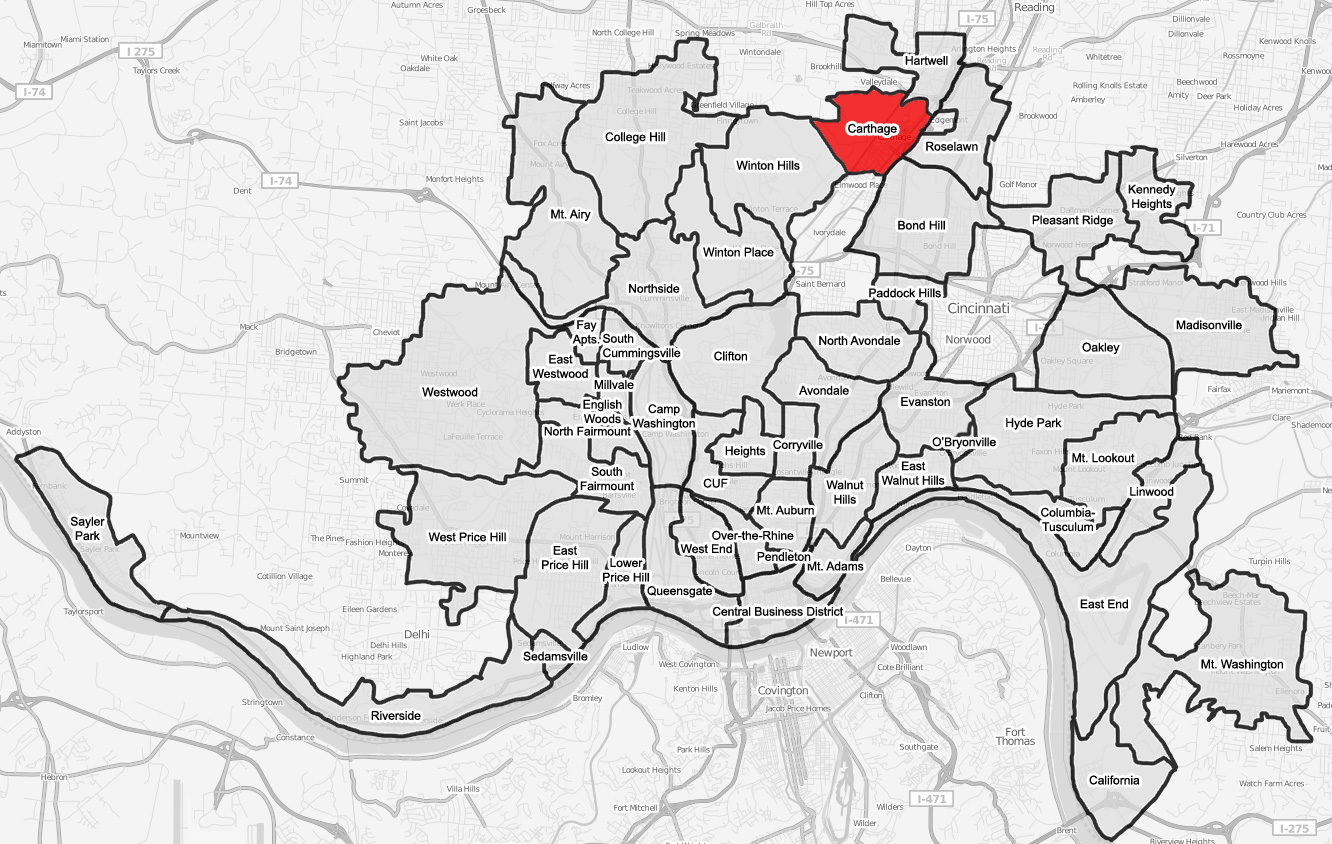
- Carthage (red) within Cincinnati, Ohio
- Country: United States
- State: Ohio
- County: Hamilton
- City: Cincinnati

Population (2020)
  - Total: 2,781

Carthage is one of the 52 neighborhoods of Cincinnati, Ohio. Established in 1791 or 1792 and annexed in 1911, it is located in the northern part of the city's Mill Creek valley. The neighborhood is predominantly residential, and is center of the city's Hispanic community. It shares a border with Elmwood Place, Ohio, which, with adjacent St. Bernard, Ohio, forms an enclave in the middle of Cincinnati. The population was 2,781 at the 2020 census.

== History ==
This area was first settled in 1791 or 1792, when Capt. Jacob White, from Redstone (Brownsville), Pennsylvania settled and founded White's Station in the extreme southeastern section of Springfield Township. White's Station, a small log blockhouse, was attacked by a party of Native Americans on the 19th of October, 1793.

Carthage had 148 inhabitants in the 1830 United States census.

Carthage was incorporated as a village in 1868 and then annexed into Cincinnati in 1911.

The Vine Street corridor in Carthage was once a major concentration of Cincinnati’s automobile dealerships. A prominent remnant of that period is the tall vintage ‘Big Indian’ sign, installed in 1954 as advertising for a former car lot and now recognized as a longstanding local landmark. The sign’s depiction of a Native American chieftain has periodically drawn criticism in local media, with some residents arguing that it reflects outdated stereotypes, while others view it as a piece of mid‑century roadside advertising history.

Carthage began to experience significant Hispanic migration in the 1990s, resulting in the creation of a Hispanic community around the business district along Vine Street.

== Demographics ==
As of the census of 2020, there were 2,781 people living in the neighborhood. There were 1,187 housing units. The racial makeup of the neighborhood was 39.1% White, 25.0% Black or African American, 1.0% Native American, 1.6% Asian, 0.1% Pacific Islander, 24.2% from some other race, and 9.0% from two or more races. 31.6% of the population were Hispanic or Latino of any race.

There were 1,040 households, out of which 68.5% were families. 24.2% of all households were made up of individuals.

32.8% of the neighborhood's population were under the age of 18, 55.5% were 18 to 64, and 11.7% were 65 years of age or older. 49.6% of the population were male and 50.4% were female.

According to the U.S. Census American Community Survey, for the period 2016-2020 the estimated median annual income for a household in the neighborhood was $37,389. About 18.4% of family households were living below the poverty line. About 11.6% had a bachelor's degree or higher.
