= Hartwell, Cincinnati =

Coordinates: 39°12′40″N 84°28′30″W

Hartwell
- Neighborhood of Cincinnati
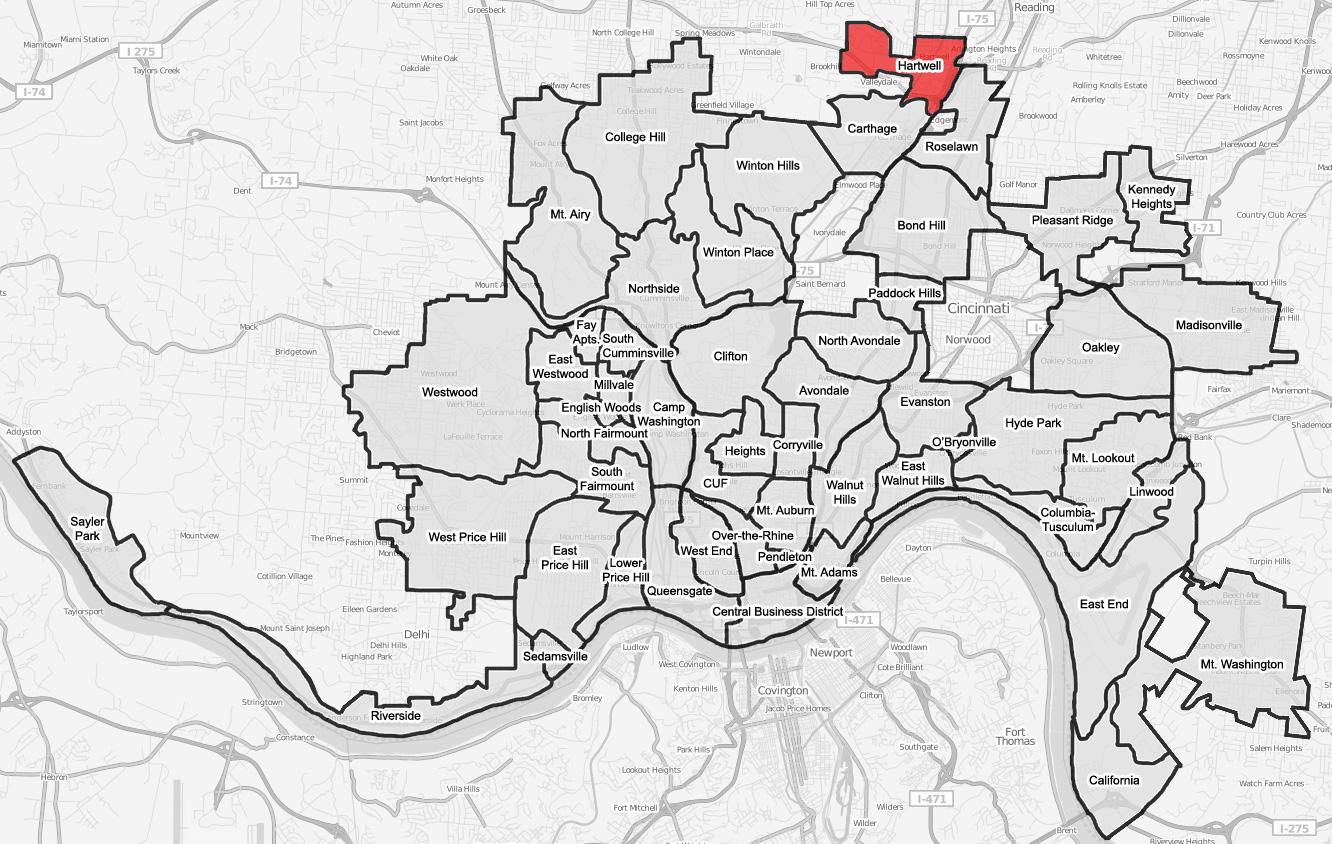
- Hartwell (red) within Cincinnati, Ohio
- Country: United States
- State: Ohio
- County: Hamilton
- City: Cincinnati

Population (2020)
  - Total: 5,806

Hartwell is one of the 52 neighborhoods of Cincinnati, Ohio. Established in 1868 and annexed in 1912, it is the city's northernmost neighborhood, centered roughly on the intersections of I-75 and Ronald Reagan Cross County Highway. Its boundaries are a combination of Caldwell Park and Ronald Reagan Cross County Highway to the south, I-75 to the east, and a combination of Millsdale Street and Compton Road to the North. The population was 5,806 at the 2020 census.

== History ==
Hartwell was platted in 1868 by the Hamilton County Building Association. It was named for John W. Hartwell, who was vice president of the Cincinnati, Hamilton and Dayton Railway when the station was located.

Hartwell was incorporated as a village in 1876. In 1912, the village was annexed by the City of Cincinnati.

== Demographics ==
As of the census of 2020, there were 5,806 people living in the neighborhood. There were 2,891 housing units. The racial makeup of the neighborhood was 44.6% White, 44.7% Black or African American, 0.7% Native American, 2.5% Asian, 0.2% Pacific Islander, 7.3% from some other race, and 6.5% from two or more races. 10.3% of the population were Hispanic or Latino of any race.

There were 2,384 households, out of which 43.5% were families. 44.6% of all households were made up of individuals.

18.1% of the neighborhood's population were under the age of 18, 67.8% were 18 to 64, and 14.1% were 65 years of age or older. 47.4% of the population were male and 52.6% were female.

According to the U.S. Census American Community Survey, for the period 2016-2020 the estimated median annual income for a household in the neighborhood was $52,396. About 13.3% of family households were living below the poverty line. About 23.3% had a bachelor's degree or higher.
