= Winton Hills, Cincinnati =

Coordinates: 39°11′20″N 84°30′45″W

Winton Hills
- Neighborhood of Cincinnati
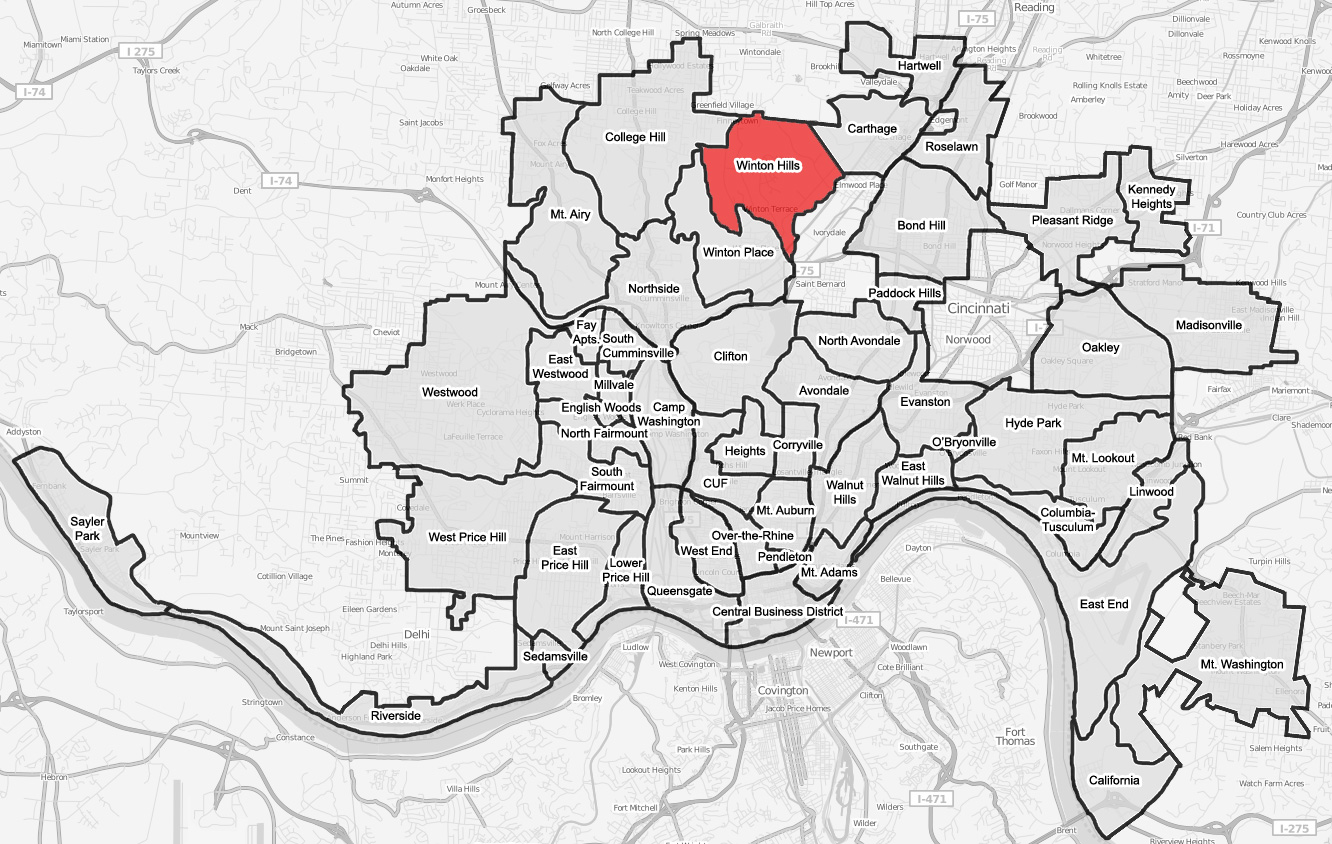
- Winton Hills (red) within Cincinnati, Ohio
- Country: United States
- State: Ohio
- County: Hamilton
- City: Cincinnati

Population (2020)
  - Total: 5,684

Winton Hills is one of the 52 neighborhoods of Cincinnati, Ohio. The neighborhood primarily consists of housing projects known as Winton Terrace. The population was 5,684 at the 2020 census.

== History ==
In 1940, the Cincinnati Metropolitan Housing Authority (CMHA) established Winton Terrace as a planned housing project. The establishment of the neighborhood was born out of local reformers' push to address the city's housing shortage in the late nineteenth and early twentieth century, with organizations such as the Better Housing League arguing that the shortage caused Cincinnati's urban core to deteriorate into slums. With financial support from the federal government due to the Housing Act of 1937, the CMHA opted for a two-pronged approach to the housing crisis, coupling the construction of public housing with the future clearance of neighborhoods the government considered slums. Because the CMHA's housing projects were racially segregated, after the construction of the city's first housing projects in the predominantly black neighborhood of the West End, the CMHA sought to build their next projects as white-only communities in predominantly white neighborhoods. Therefore, Winton Terrace's site was chosen due to its location in the predominantly white neighborhood of Winton Place (now Spring Grove Village). The neighborhood opened in 1941.

Winton Terrace continued to exclude black residents until the neighborhood expanded in 1958 with the construction of another public housing project known as Findlater Gardens. The CMHA intended Findlater Gardens to be an experiment in racial integration in an effort to combat white flight and other segregationist housing patterns in the city. Initially, only a limited black residents were allowed in Findlater Gardens to try to prevent white flight from the neighborhood. However, white flight continued throughout the 1960s, causing the CMHA to fully desegregate the neighborhood.

== Demographics ==
As of the census of 2020, there were 5,648 people living in the neighborhood. There were 2,392 housing units. The racial makeup of the neighborhood was 8.5% White, 80.2% Black or African American, 0.5% Native American, 0.7% Asian, 0.0% Pacific Islander, 3.1% from some other race, and 7.6% from two or more races. 5.1% of the population were Hispanic or Latino of any race.

There were 2,646 households, out of which 57.5% were families. About 41.1% of all households were made up of individuals.

52.3% of the neighborhood's population were under the age of 18, 39.2% were 18 to 64, and 8.5% were 65 years of age or older. 40.3% of the population were male and 59.7% were female.

According to the U.S. Census American Community Survey, for the period 2016-2020 the estimated median annual income for a household in the neighborhood was $17,949. About 53.5% of family households were living below the poverty line. About 7.8% of adults had a bachelor's degree or higher.
