= Glencoe–Auburn Hotel and Glencoe–Auburn Place Row Houses =

- U.S. National Register of Historic Places
- U.S. Historic district
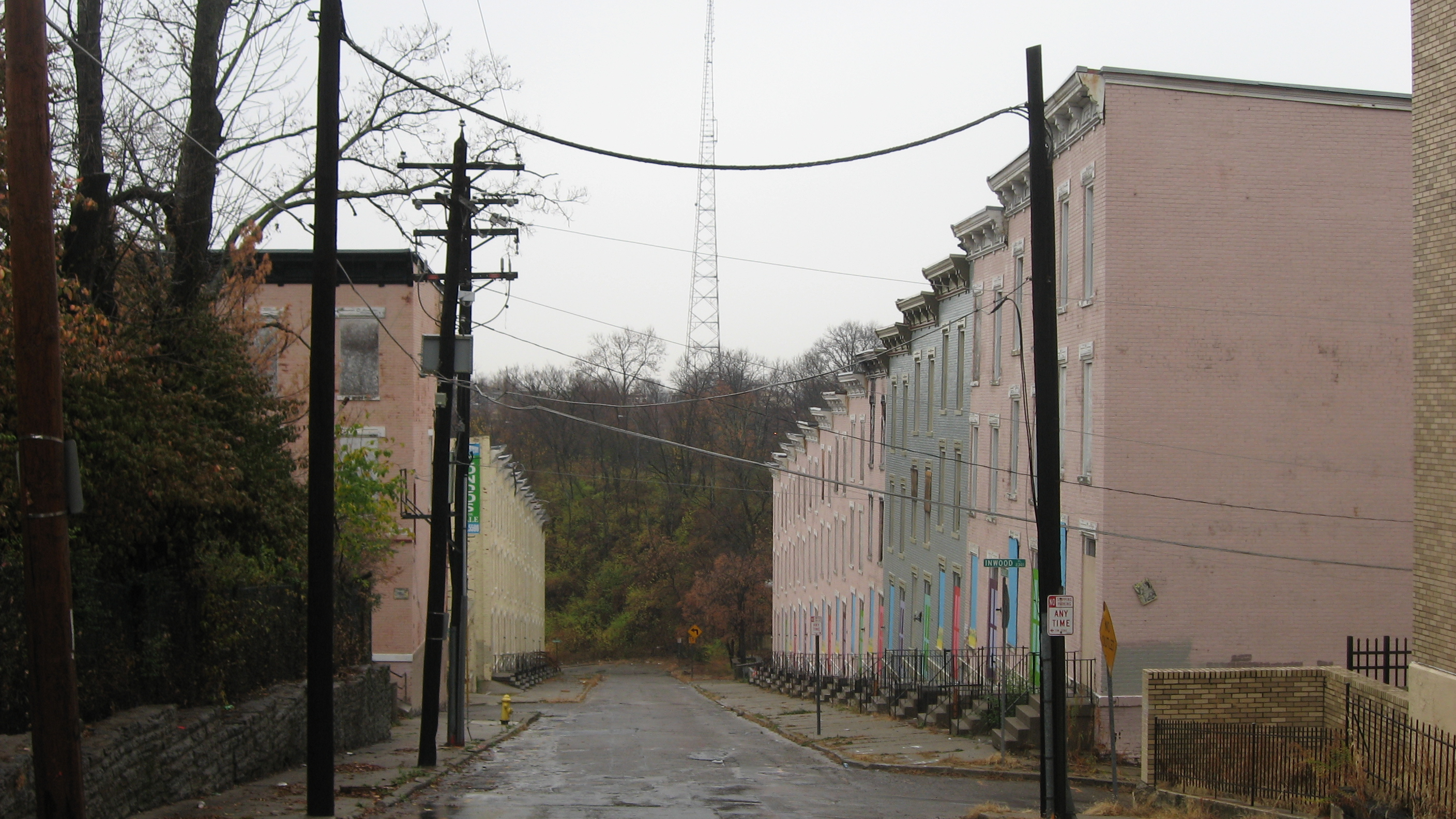
- Looking down Glencoe Place

- Location within Ohio Location within the United States
- Location: Glencoe Place, Leroy Court, View Court, Cincinnati, Ohio
- Coordinates: 39°7′22″N 84°30′37″W
- Area: 40 acres (160,000 m^{2})
- Built: 1884
- Architectural style: Italianate, Queen Anne
- NRHP reference No.: 03001286
- Added to NRHP: December 10, 2003

Glencoe–Auburn Hotel and Glencoe–Auburn Place Row Houses was a registered historic district in Cincinnati, Ohio, listed in the National Register of Historic Places on December 10, 2003. It contained 54 contributing buildings. The complex was originally constructed between 1884 and 1891, by a Jethro Mitchell.

== History ==
The exact date of construction of the Glencoe Complex is disputed amongst sources. Hamilton County tax records list the buildings as being constructed between 1870 and 1875, although the application for historic status lists the years 1884 to 1891 as the dates of construction. 1891 is also the first year the buildings are shown on a Sanborn Fire Insurance Map.

The architect of the building is unknown, however the builders/developers are often listed as being either Truman B. Handy or Jethro Mitchell. Both were prominent figures of the time, and Mitchell was Handy's son in law (having married his daughter despite being 42 years older). Jethro Mitchell can be inferred as the official builder, for Handy died in a carriage accident in 1884. Handy and Mitchell both spent time working with famous Cincinnati architect James W. McLaughlin, so it is possible that he may have had a hand in the design of the complex.

Despite the outward appearance of the facade, the buildings are divided up into single story apartments rather than walkup row houses. It is for this reason, along with early accounts and descriptions of the hotel, that the complex was, and has been intended to be housing for the poor.

== Rehabilitation ==
The first rent strike to occur in the city of Cincinnati took place at the Glencoe complex. After this, a proposal was made to rehabilitate the property. The redevelopment plan went through, and saw initial promise. Of the nearly 250 to 500 existing units in 1964 (sources disagree on the actual number, either way there were a large number of small units), renovations led to 99 units of a more comfortable size. The success was great, The Bicentennial Guide to Greater Cincinnati, published in 1988, still described the area as being successful almost 15 years after the renovation, stating that “the Glencoe Place Redevelopment has been honored by local, state, and national urban development organizations.”

In the 1990s, however, the site fell into disrepair and poverty, and once again became known for its drugs and crime rather than its redevelopment success. When area developer Pauline Van der Haer of Dorian Development purchased the property in 2004, the buildings had been vacant and boarded up for two years. Initial plans were to renovate the structures into 68 medium- and high-class condominia (priced between $200,000 and $300,000), and add a parking garage – almost a necessity for the occupant target market. The project was never completed due to funding problems and disagreements between the developer and city council. The city of Cincinnati agreed to fund improvements to city-owned land.

A demolition permit was filed on December 20, 2012 and was issued on March 13, 2013. Demolition began five days later.
