= Mount Adams Public School =

- U.S. National Register of Historic Places
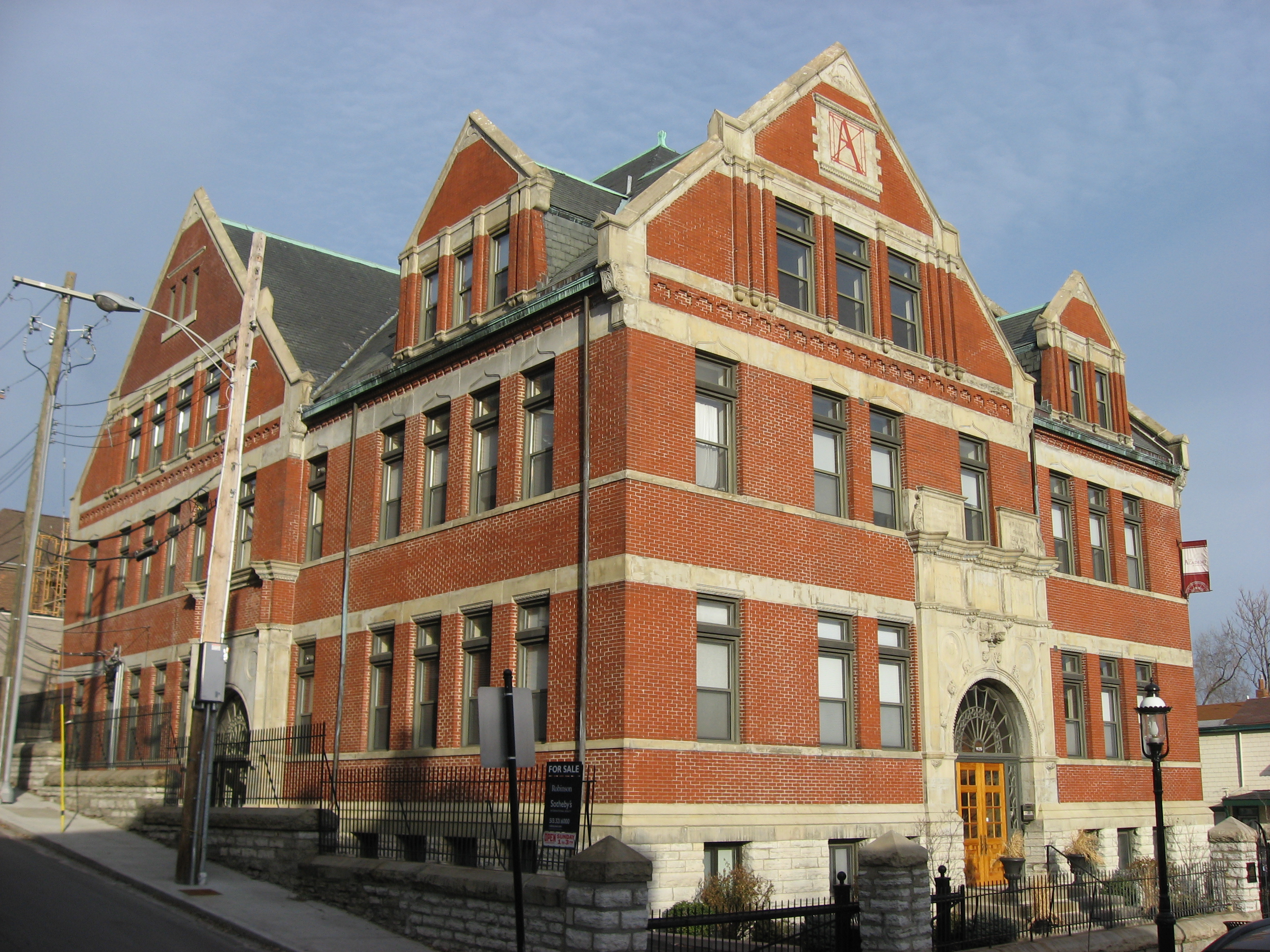
- Front and southern side of the school
- Location: Cincinnati, Ohio
- Coordinates: 39°06′31″N 84°29′52″W
- Architect: Henry E. Siter
- Architectural style: Romanesque
- NRHP reference No.: 80003066
- Added to NRHP: November 24, 1980

Mount Adams Public School is a registered historic building in Cincinnati, Ohio, listed in the National Register on November 24, 1980.

It was the first home of the School for Creative and Performing Arts from 1973 to 1975.
