= Villages at Roll Hill, Cincinnati =

Coordinates: 39°09′22″N 84°33′38″W

Villages at Roll Hill
- Neighborhood of Cincinnati
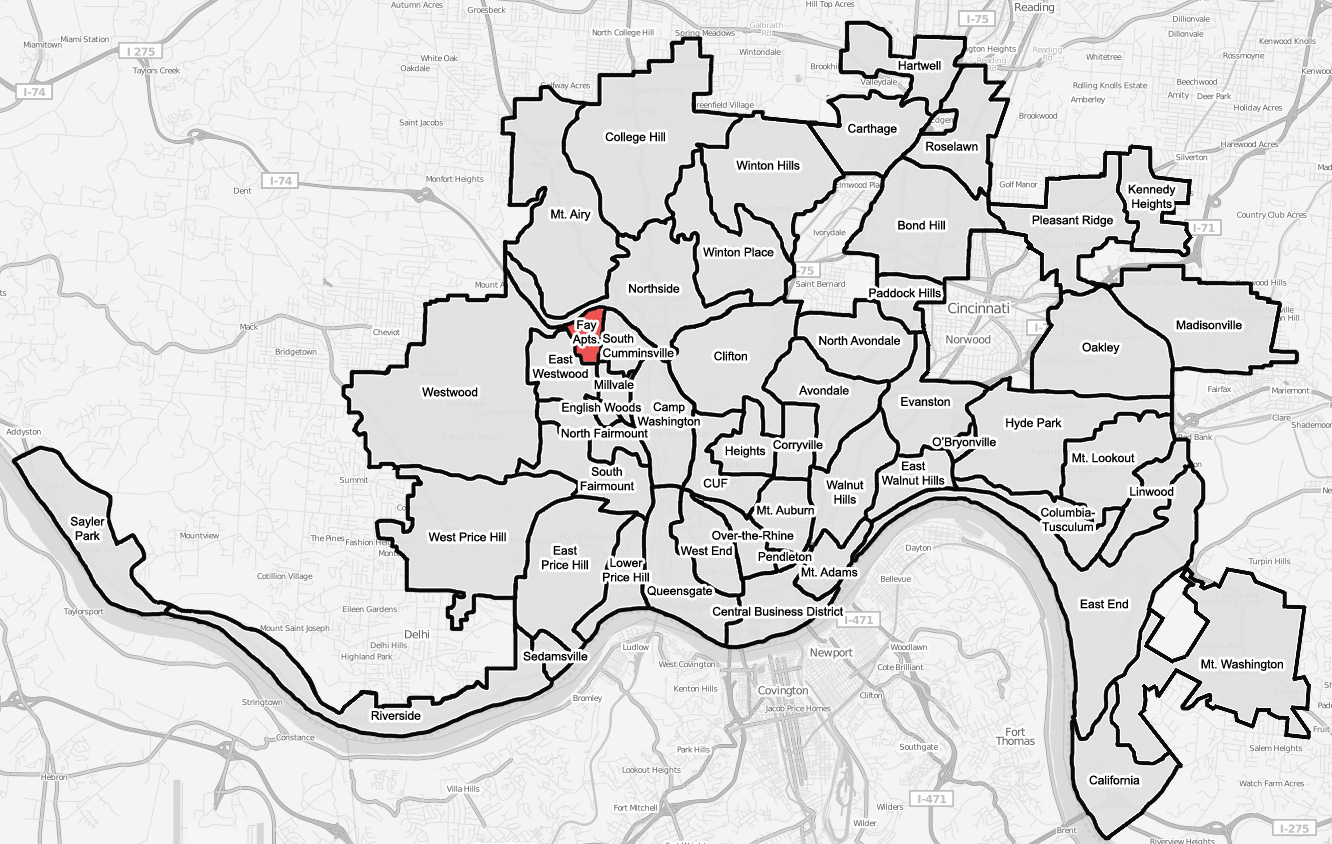
- Villages at Roll Hill (red) within Cincinnati, Ohio
- Country: United States
- State: Ohio
- County: Hamilton
- City: Cincinnati

Population (2020)
  - Total: 1,918

Villages at Roll Hill (formerly called Fay Apartments) is one of the 52 neighborhoods of Cincinnati, Ohio. The neighborhood predominantly consists of Section 8 housing. The population was 1,918 at the 2020 census.

== History ==
In the 1850s, Roll Hill was the site of tunneling project as part of the Cincinnati Western Railroad's attempt to build a standard-gauge track from Cincinnati to Chicago. The company went bankrupt in 1860, leaving the railroad tunnel under Roll Hill unfinished.

Roll Hill was transformed into a public housing project in the 1960s, with the projects receiving the name Fay Apartments. In the 2010s, the neighborhood's projects received a $36 million renovation. The neighborhood was renamed from Fay Apartments to Villages at Roll Hill in December 2012 during the renovations.

== Demographics ==
As of the census of 2020, there were 1,918 people living in the neighborhood. There were 744 housing units. The racial makeup of the neighborhood was 5.8% White, 83.3% Black or African American, 0.3% Native American, 0.2% Asian, 0.0% Pacific Islander, 3.1% from some other race, and 7.4% from two or more races. 6.4% of the population were Hispanic or Latino of any race.

There were 844 households, out of which 82.5% were families. About 15.8% of all households were made up of individuals.

66.0% of the neighborhood's population were under the age of 18, 32.8% were 18 to 64, and 1.2% were 65 years of age or older. 35.2% of the population were male and 64.8% were female.

According to the U.S. Census American Community Survey, for the period 2016-2020 the estimated median annual income for a household in the neighborhood was $11,327. About 80.0% of family households were living below the poverty line. About 1.2% of adults had a bachelor's degree or higher.
