= East Westwood, Cincinnati =

Coordinates: 39°9′N 84°34′W

East Westwood
- Neighborhood of Cincinnati
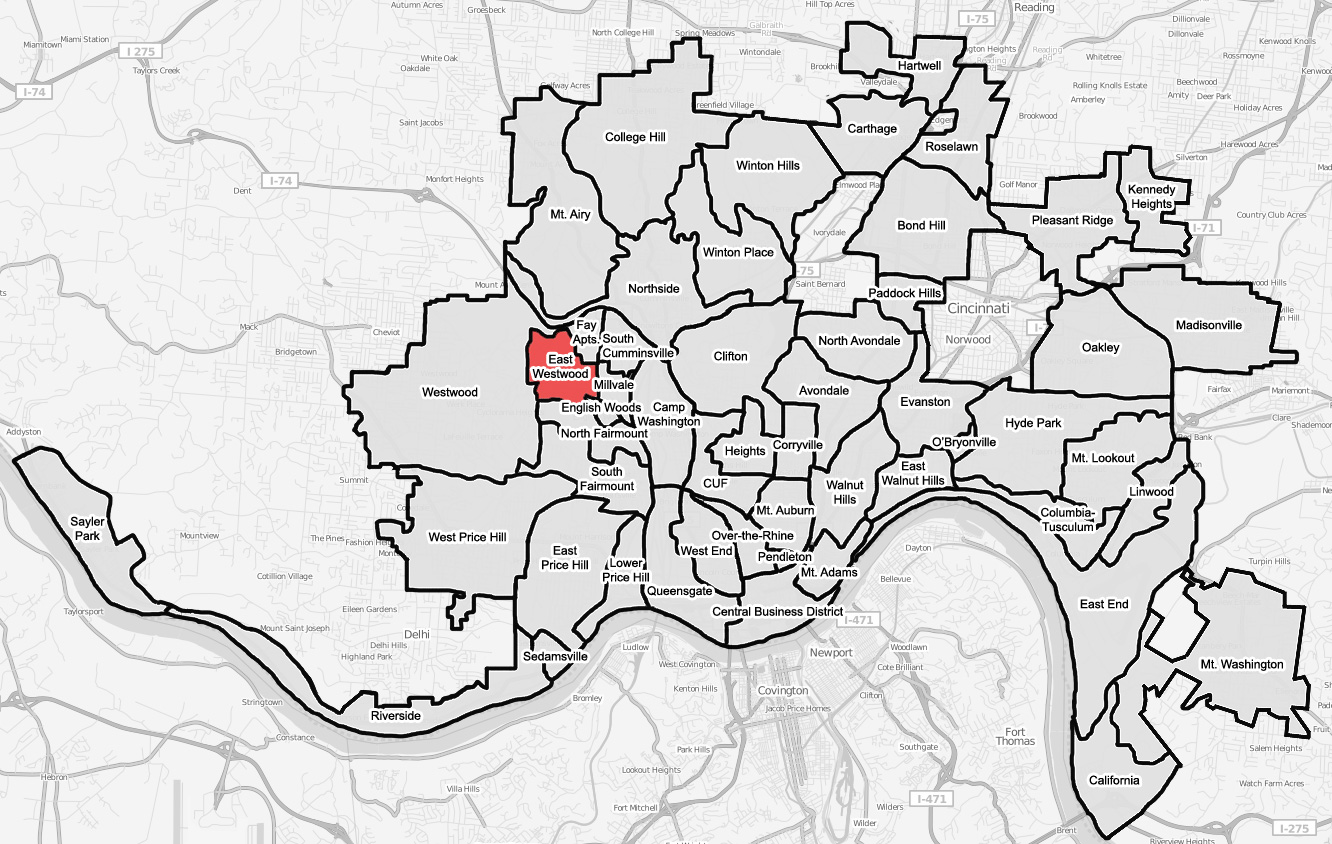
- Country: United States
- State: Ohio
- City: Cincinnati

Population (2020)
  - Total: 2,458
- Time zone: UTC-5 (EST)
  - Summer (DST): UTC-4 (EDT)

East Westwood is one of the 52 neighborhoods of Cincinnati, Ohio. The population was 2,458 at the 2020 census.

== Demographics ==
Population of 2010-2020
Year	Pop.	±%
2010	2,445	—
2020	2,458	+0.5%

As of the census of 2020, there were 2,458 people living in the neighborhood. There were 1,438 housing units. The racial makeup of the neighborhood was 12.3% White, 79.9% Black or African American, 0.3% Native American, 0.4% Asian, 0.1% Pacific Islander, 2.1% from some other race, and 4.9% from two or more races. 2.5% of the population were Hispanic or Latino of any race.

There were 1,431 households, out of which 56.4% were families. 37.9% of all households were made up of individuals.

34.5% of the neighborhood's population were under the age of 18, 49.9% were 18 to 64, and 15.6% were 65 years of age or older. 58.8% of the population were male and 41.2% were female.

According to the U.S. Census American Community Survey, for the period 2016-2020 the estimated median annual income for a household in the neighborhood was $20,929. About 48.5% of family households were living below the poverty line. About 3.4% had a bachelor's degree or higher.
