= Roselawn, Cincinnati =

Coordinates: 39°11′42″N 84°27′45″W

Roselawn
- Neighborhood of Cincinnati
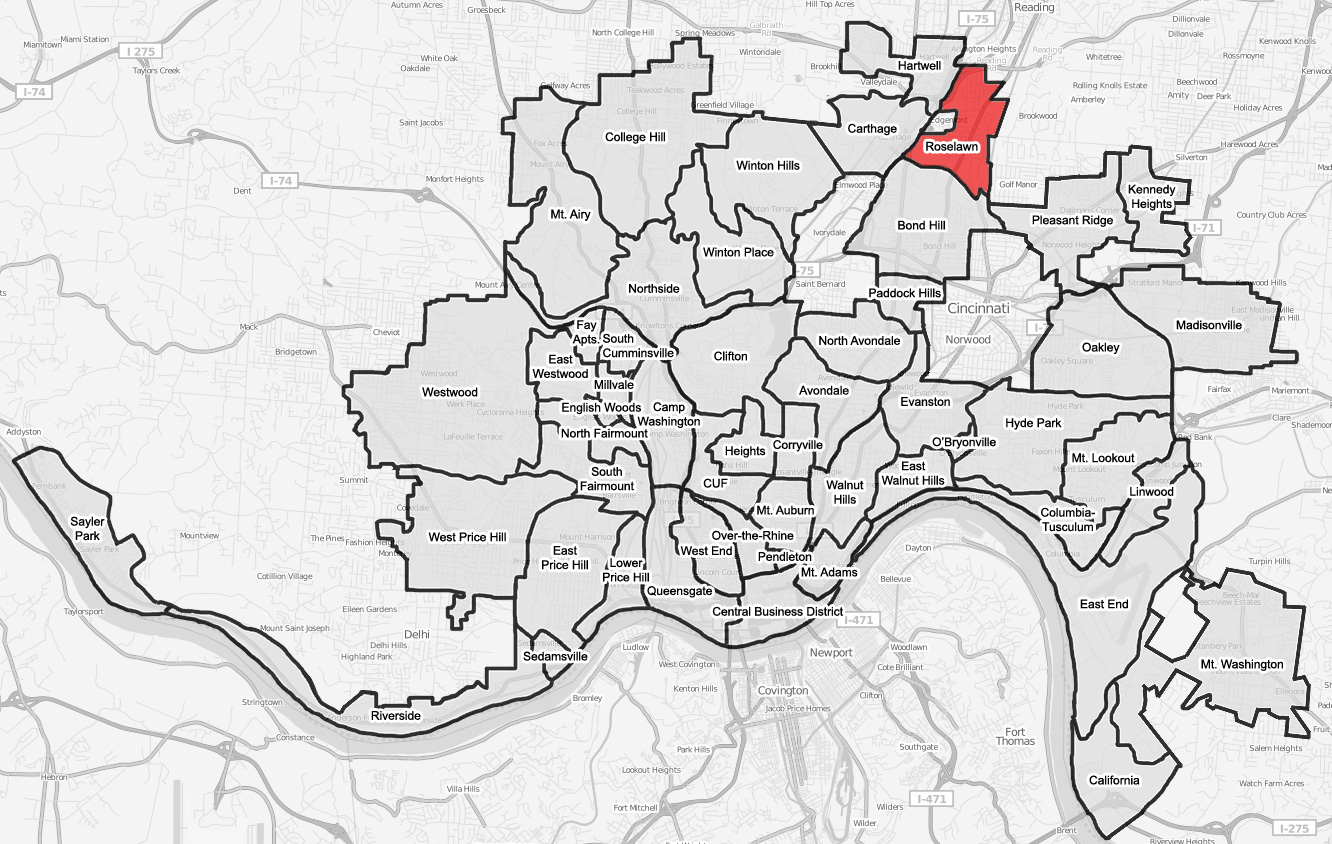
- Roselawn (red) within Cincinnati, Ohio
- Country: United States
- State: Ohio
- County: Hamilton
- City: Cincinnati

Population (2020)
  - Total: 7,039

Roselawn is one of the 52 neighborhoods of Cincinnati, Ohio. The population was 7,039 at the 2020 census.

== History ==
Roselawn was annexed to the city of Cincinnati in 1905.

== Demographics ==
As of the census of 2020, there were 7,039 people living in the neighborhood. There were 3,672 housing units. The racial makeup of the neighborhood was 11.3% White, 82.7% Black or African American, 0.3% Native American, 0.6% Asian, 0.1% Pacific Islander, 1.0% from some other race, and 4.0% from two or more races. 1.7% of the population were Hispanic or Latino of any race.

There were 3,692 households, out of which 49.7% were families. 49.1% of all households were made up of individuals.

25.9% of the neighborhood's population were under the age of 18, 51.7% were 18 to 64, and 22.4% were 65 years of age or older. 44.0% of the population were male and 56.0% were female.

According to the U.S. Census American Community Survey, for the period 2016-2020 the estimated median annual income for a household in the neighborhood was $24,575. About 29.0% of family households were living below the poverty line. About 16.7% of adults had a bachelor's degree or higher.
