= Sycamore-13th Street Grouping =

- U.S. National Register of Historic Places
- U.S. Historic district
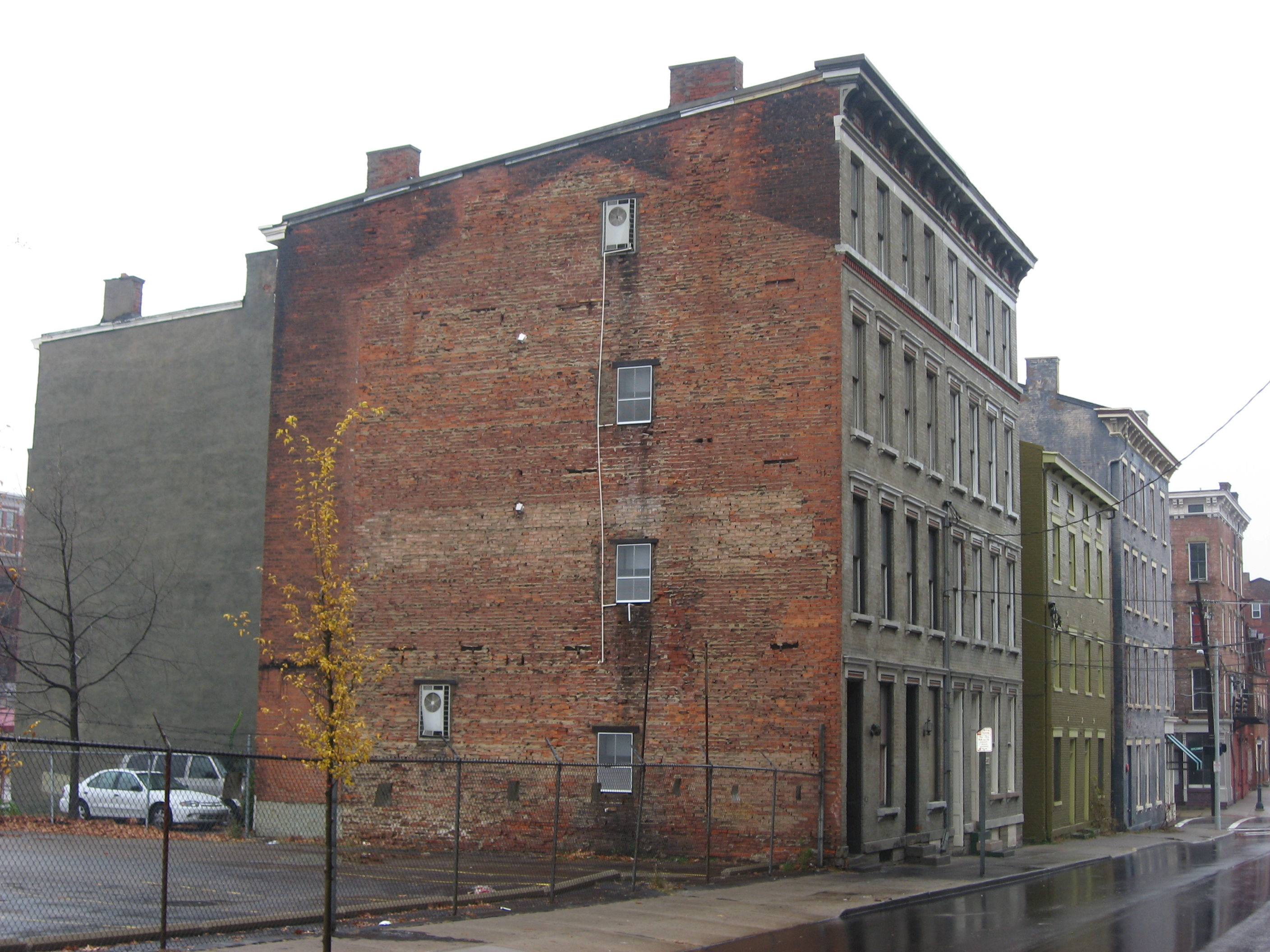
- Eastern side of the district

- Location within Ohio Location within the United States
- Location: 12th, 13th, and Sycamore Sts., Cincinnati, Ohio
- Coordinates: 39°6′35″N 84°30′35″W
- Area: 1.5 acres (0.61 ha)
- Built: 1853
- Architectural style: Greek Revival, Italianate, Queen Anne
- NRHP reference No.: 82003588
- Added to NRHP: June 1, 1982

The Sycamore-13th Street Grouping is a cluster of historic buildings in the Over-the-Rhine neighborhood of Cincinnati, Ohio, United States. Built during the middle and later years of the nineteenth century, these eighteen buildings are built of brick and sandstone with elements of stone and iron. Some of the buildings feature elements of the Greek Revival, Italianate, or Queen Anne styles of architecture, but the majority of the buildings in the cluster are simple vernacular structures. Virtually all of the buildings in the grouping were constructed for residential purposes, although some were built exclusively as apartment buildings, while some originally had both residential and commercial space. The structures built as commercial-and-residential buildings are those most likely to feature defined architectural styles, rather than vernacular designs.

Nearly all of the buildings in the grouping, if not all, were built according to plans in common carpenters' books of the day. As such, they are important examples of late nineteenth-century architecture in built-up urban areas; although they are architecturally different, their similar methods of construction combines them into a unified cluster. In recognition of its distinctive historic architecture, the Sycamore-13th Street Grouping was declared a historic district and listed on the National Register of Historic Places in 1982. One year later, virtually all of Over-the-Rhine (more than 1,200 buildings) was similarly designated and added to the Register.
