= Millvale, Cincinnati =

Coordinates: 39°08′51″N 84°33′05″W

Millvale
- Neighborhood of Cincinnati
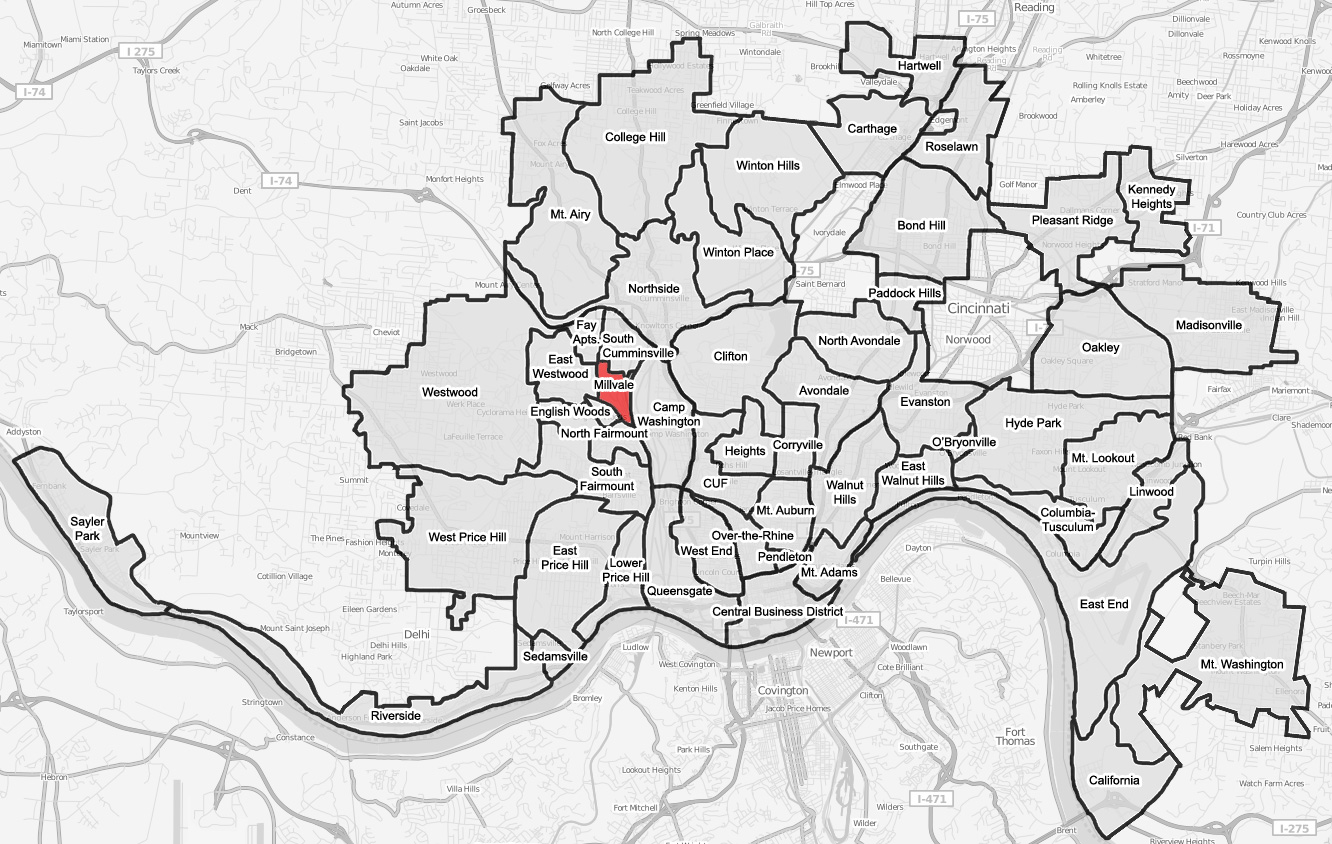
- Millvale (red) within Cincinnati, Ohio
- Country: United States
- State: Ohio
- County: Hamilton
- City: Cincinnati

Population (2020)
  - Total: 1,965

Millvale is one of the 52 neighborhoods of Cincinnati, Ohio. The population was 1,965 at the 2020 census. Millvale is predominantly black. About a third of residents live in public housing.

== Demographics ==
As of the census of 2020, there were 1,965 people living in the neighborhood. There were 817 housing units. The racial makeup of the neighborhood was 5.9% White, 86.5% Black or African American, 0.5% Native American, 0.1% Asian, 0.0% Pacific Islander, 1.4% from some other race, and 5.6% from two or more races. 1.7% of the population were Hispanic or Latino of any race.

There were 893 households, out of which 70.8% were families. 24.4% of all households were made up of individuals.

49.7% of the neighborhood's population were under the age of 18, 45.3% were 18 to 64, and 5.0% were 65 years of age or older. 40.7% of the population were male and 59.3% were female.

According to the U.S. Census American Community Survey, for the period 2016-2020 the estimated median annual income for a household in the neighborhood was $12,272. About 66.0% of family households were living below the poverty line. About 3.2% had a bachelor's degree or higher.

== Recreation ==
Cincinnati Recreation Commission operates the Millvale Recreation Center.
