= List of census-designated places in Ohio =

Map of the United States with Ohio highlighted

This article lists census-designated places (CDPs) in the U.S. state of Ohio. As of 2020, there were a total of 341 census-designated places in Ohio.

== List of census-designated places (CDPs) in Ohio ==
CDP	Population	County
Ai	322	Fulton
Alvordton	200	Williams
Amelia	12,575	Clermont
Andersonville	778	Ross
Apple Valley	5,352	Knox
Atwater	776	Portage
Austinburg	505	Ashtabula
Austintown	29,594	Mahoning
Bainbridge	9,242	Geauga
Ballville	3,823	Sandusky
Bannock	159	Belmont
Bascom	397	Seneca
Bass Lake	530	Geauga
Beckett Ridge	9,192	Butler
Beechwood Trails	3,276	Licking
Bentonville	253	Adams
Berlin	1,447	Holmes
Beulah Beach	75	Erie
Bidwell	863	Gallia
Birmingham	286	Erie
Blacklick Estates	8,990	Franklin
Bladensburg	180	Knox
Blaine	473	Belmont
Bloomingville	255	Erie
Blue Jay	1,427	Hamilton
Bolindale	1,921	Trumbull
Bolton	654	Stark
Bourneville	241	Ross
Brady Lake	1,222	Portage
Brandt	282	Miami
Brecon	408	Hamilton
Bridgetown	14,731	Hamilton
Brilliant	1,317	Jefferson
Brimfield	3,365	Portage
Brookfield Center	1,141	Trumbull
Brownsville	214	Licking
Brunersburg	314	Defiance
Buffalo	373	Guernsey
Buford	306	Highland
Burlington	2,416	Lawrence
Calcutta	3,941	Columbiana
Camp Dennison	384	Hamilton
Canal Lewisville	417	Coshocton
Candlewood Lake	1,329	Morrow
Carbon Hill	178	Hocking
Celeryville	222	Huron
Champion Heights	6,386	Trumbull
Cherry Fork	170	Adams
Cherry Grove	4,419	Hamilton
Chesterland	7,074	Geauga
Chippewa Park	819	Logan
Choctaw Lake	2,047	Madison
Churchill	2,176	Trumbull
Cinnamon Lake	1,237	Ashland
Clarktown	911	Scioto
Coldstream	1,322	Hamilton
Collins	628	Huron
Concorde Hills	644	Hamilton
Connorville	160	Jefferson
Covedale	6,472	Hamilton
Crystal Lakes	1,394	Clark
Crystal Rock	138	Erie
Curtice	1,552	Lucas and Ottawa
Cynthiana	57	Pike
Damascus	418	Columbiana and Mahoning
Darbydale	768	Franklin
Darrtown	514	Butler
Day Heights	2,625	Clermont
Delhi Hills	5,022	Hamilton
Delshire	3,158	Hamilton
Dent	12,301	Hamilton
Derby	355	Pickaway
Devola	2,639	Washington
Dillonvale	3,436	Hamilton
Dola	143	Hardin
Drexel	1,693	Montgomery
Dry Ridge	2,698	Hamilton
Dry Run	7,672	Hamilton
Duncan Falls	898	Muskingum
Dundee	269	Tuscarawas
Dunlap	1,658	Hamilton
East Alliance	268	Mahoning
East Fultonham	290	Muskingum
East Liberty	371	Logan
East Rochester	224	Columbiana
East Springfield	185	Jefferson
Eaton Estates	1,155	Lorain
Edgewood	4,185	Ashtabula
Elizabethtown	323	Hamilton
Etna	1,209	Licking
Fairfield Beach	1,267	Fairfield
Finneytown	12,399	Hamilton
Five Points	2,247	Warren
Flat Rock	227	Seneca
Forestville	10,615	Hamilton
Fort McKinley	3,473	Montgomery
Fort Seneca	230	Seneca
Fort Shawnee	6,263	Allen
Four Bridges	3,401	Butler
Franklin Furnace	1,525	Scioto
Fresno	140	Coshocton
Friendship	343	Scioto
Fruit Hill	3,748	Hamilton
Glencoe	264	Belmont
Glenmoor	1,829	Columbiana
Gomer	345	Allen
Good Hope	202	Fayette
Goshen	715	Clermont
Grandview	1,312	Hamilton
Granville South	1,420	Licking
Green Meadows	2,373	Clark
Greentown	3,382	Stark
Groesbeck	7,365	Hamilton
Guilford Lake	1,188	Columbiana
Hamburg	456	Fairfield
Hannibal	314	Monroe
Harbor Hills	1,565	Licking
Harrisburg	306	Franklin and Pickaway
Haydenville	337	Hocking
Hessville	174	Sandusky
Hide-A-Way Hills	976	Fairfield and Hocking
Hidden Lakes	16	Morrow
Highland Holiday	571	Highland
Highpoint	1,558	Hamilton
Hilltop	658	Trumbull
Hockingport	205	Athens
Holiday Lakes	828	Huron
Holiday Valley	1,480	Clark
Homeworth	492	Columbiana
Hooven	464	Hamilton
Howard	246	Knox
Howland Center	6,351	Trumbull
Huber Ridge	4,940	Franklin
Hunter	3,363	Warren
Iberia	431	Morrow
Jacksontown	402	Licking
Jersey	427	Licking
Kanauga	185	Gallia
Kansas	175	Seneca
Kenwood	7,570	Hamilton
Kidron	966	Wayne
Kilbourne	127	Delaware
Kimbolton	152	Guernsey
Kings Mills	1,336	Warren
Kingsville	824	Ashtabula
Kinsman Center	574	Trumbull
Kunkle	173	Williams
La Croft	1,078	Columbiana
Lafayette	206	Madison
Lafferty	255	Belmont
Lake Buckhorn	720	Holmes
Lake Darby	4,731	Franklin
Lake Lakengren	3,387	Preble
Lake Lorelei	1,172	Brown
Lake Milton	637	Mahoning
Lake Mohawk	1,601	Carroll
Lake Seneca	529	Williams
Lake Tomahawk	494	Columbiana
Lake Waynoka	1,381	Brown
Lakeside	668	Ottawa
Landen	6,995	Warren
Lansing	596	Belmont
Lawrenceville	667	Clark
Leavittsburg	1,571	Trumbull
Lewistown	202	Logan
Limaville	151	Stark
Lincoln Heights	1,039	Richland
Lincoln Village	9,702	Franklin
Little Hocking	244	Washington
Lloydsville	280	Belmont
Logan Elm Village	1,045	Pickaway
Loveland Park	1,737	Hamilton and Warren
Lucasville	1,655	Scioto
Mack	11,088	Hamilton
Madison Place	572	Hamilton
Maple Ridge	667	Mahoning
Maplewood Park	243	Trumbull
Marathon	155	Clermont
Maria Stein	1,067	Mercer
Marlboro	247	Stark
Marne	772	Licking
Massieville	584	Ross
Masury	2,001	Trumbull
McCutchenville	371	Seneca and Wyandot
McDermott	308	Scioto
McKinley Heights	950	Trumbull
Medway	627	Clark
Melmore	173	Seneca
Miami Heights	5,166	Hamilton
Miamitown	1,256	Hamilton
Miamiville	205	Clermont
Middlebranch	2,117	Stark
Miller	455	Lawrence
Millfield	311	Athens
Mineral Ridge	3,951	Mahoning and Trumbull
Minford	641	Scioto
Mitiwanga	326	Erie
Monfort Heights	12,070	Hamilton
Montrose-Ghent	5,254	Summit
Morgandale	1,139	Trumbull
Mount Carmel	4,828	Clermont
Mount Healthy Heights	2,918	Hamilton
Mount Hope	197	Holmes
Mount Repose	4,648	Clermont
Mulberry	3,459	Clermont
Nankin	435	Ashland
Nashport	449	Muskingum
Neapolis	497	Lucas
Neffs	878	Belmont
Negley	274	Columbiana
Nettle Lake	210	Williams
New Baltimore	1,596	Hamilton
New Burlington	5,049	Hamilton
New California	2,225	Union
New Hampshire	150	Auglaize
New Haven	572	Hamilton
New Haven	356	Huron
New Marshfield	316	Athens
New Pittsburg	303	Wayne
New Springfield	579	Mahoning
Newport	169	Shelby
Newport	895	Washington
North Industry	1,528	Stark
North Lawrence	212	Stark
North Lima	1,369	Mahoning
North Madison	8,188	Lake
North Zanesville	3,116	Muskingum
Northbrook	10,912	Hamilton
Northgate	7,277	Hamilton
Northridge	8,369	Clark
Oceola	156	Crawford
Olde West Chester	201	Butler
Old Fort	143	Seneca
Orient	246	Pickaway
Pancoastburg	68	Fayette
Park Layne	4,248	Clark
Parkman	282	Geauga
Pekin	314	Carroll
Perry Heights	8,391	Stark
Petersburg	405	Mahoning
Pettisville	469	Fulton
Pheasant Run	1,362	Lorain
Pigeon Creek	886	Summit
Plainville	120	Hamilton
Pleasant Grove	1,726	Muskingum
Pleasant Hills	950	Hamilton
Pleasant Run	4,861	Hamilton
Pleasant Run Farm	4,779	Hamilton
Plumwood	257	Madison
Portage Lakes	6,407	Summit
Pottery Addition	258	Jefferson
Pulaski	121	Williams
Radnor	180	Delaware
Raymond	280	Union
Reedurban	5,889	Stark
Remington	368	Hamilton
Reno	1,129	Washington
Reno Beach	713	Lucas
Richmond Dale	386	Ross
Richville	3,209	Stark
Ridgeville Corners	416	Henry
Ridgewood	506	Hamilton
Roachester	579	Warren
Robertsville	293	Stark
Rockbridge	160	Hocking
Rocky Fork Point	742	Highland
Rose Farm	111	Morgan and Perry
Roseland	1,495	Richland
Rosemount	2,117	Scioto
Rosewood	224	Champaign
Ross	3,478	Butler
Rossmoyne	1,788	Hamilton
Rudolph	415	Wood
Saint Johns	181	Auglaize
Saint Martin	200	Brown
Salem Heights	336	Columbiana
Salem Heights	3,862	Hamilton
Salesville	123	Guernsey
Sandyville	350	Tuscarawas
Sardis	522	Monroe
Sawyerwood	1,382	Summit
Saybrook-on-the-Lake	1,050	Ashtabula
Sciotodale	1,049	Scioto
Sharon Center	918	Medina
Shawnee	747	Hamilton
Shawnee Hills	2,230	Greene
Sherwood	3,633	Hamilton
Shiloh	10,952	Montgomery
Sixteen Mile Stand	3,091	Hamilton
Skyline Acres	1,446	Hamilton
Somerville	258	Butler
South Canal	1,101	Trumbull
South Mount Vernon	714	Knox
Sterling	432	Wayne
Stewart	221	Athens
Stockdale	111	Pike
Stony Prairie	1,218	Sandusky
Stony Ridge	434	Wood
Suffield	949	Portage
Sullivan	603	Ashland
Sulphur Springs	197	Crawford
Summerside	4,941	Clermont
Taylor Creek	4,056	Hamilton
Tedrow	168	Fulton
The Plains	3,140	Athens
Thornport	1,120	Perry
Tippecanoe	83	Harrison
Trinway	358	Muskingum
Tuppers Plains	438	Meigs
Turpin Hills	5,162	Hamilton
Twinsburg Heights	999	Summit
Uniontown	7,173	Stark
Uniopolis	188	Auglaize
Valley City	943	Medina
Vaughnsville	278	Putnam
Vickery	101	Sandusky
Vienna Center	622	Trumbull
Vincent	329	Washington
Walnut Creek	908	Holmes
Waterford	384	Washington
West Hill	2,218	Trumbull
West Logan	912	Hocking
West Portsmouth	2,928	Scioto
Westminster	406	Allen
Wetherington	1,381	Butler
Wheelersburg	6,531	Scioto
White Oak	19,541	Hamilton
Whites Landing	350	Erie and Sandusky
Wightmans Grove	55	Sandusky
Wilberforce	2,410	Greene
Wilkshire Hills	2,940	Tuscarawas
Williamsdale	578	Butler
Williston	439	Ottawa
Winesburg	340	Holmes
Withamsville	7,357	Clermont
Wolfhurst	1,119	Belmont
Woodsdale	442	Butler
Woodworth	1,784	Mahoning
Wright-Patterson AFB	1,567	Greene

== See also ==
- List of cities in Ohio
- List of counties in Ohio
- List of townships in Ohio
- List of villages in Ohio
