= Skyline Acres, Ohio =

- Census-designated place
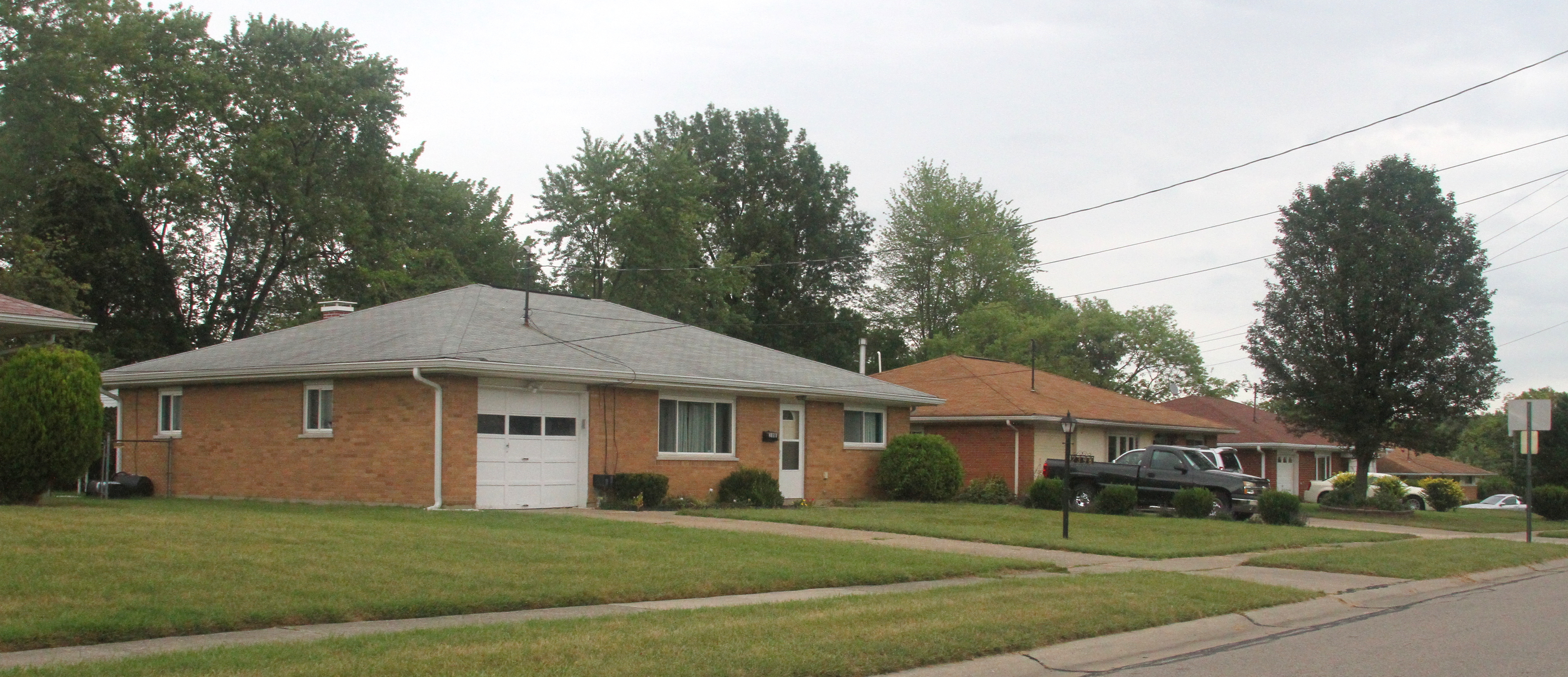
- Typical residential housing in Skyline Acres

- Location in Hamilton County and the state of Ohio
- Coordinates: 39°13′42″N 84°33′58″W
- Country: United States
- State: Ohio
- County: Hamilton

Area
  - Total: 0.60 sq mi (1.55 km^{2})
  - Land: 0.59 sq mi (1.54 km^{2})
  - Water: 0.0039 sq mi (0.01 km^{2})
- Elevation: 840 ft (260 m)

Population (2020)
  - Total: 1,446
  - Density: 2,429.6/sq mi (938.07/km^{2})
- Time zone: UTC-5 (Eastern (EST))
  - Summer (DST): UTC-4 (EDT)
- FIPS code: 39-72648
- GNIS feature ID: 2585528

Skyline Acres is a census-designated place (CDP) in Colerain and Springfield townships, Hamilton County, Ohio, United States. The population was 1,446 at the 2020 census.

== Geography ==
Skyline Acres is located 11 miles (18 km) north of downtown Cincinnati. It is bordered by Mount Healthy to the east, North College Hill to the southeast, White Oak to the southwest, Groesbeck to the west, and Northbrook to the north. Ohio State Route 126, the Ronald Reagan Cross County Highway, runs through the southern part of the CDP.

According to the United States Census Bureau, the CDP has a total area of 0.66 square miles (1.7 km^{2}), all land.

== Demographics ==
Historical population
Census	Pop.	Note	%±
2010	1,717		—
2020	1,446		−15.8%
U.S. Decennial Census

Skyline Acres first appeared as a census designated place in the 2010 U.S. census.

=== 2020 census ===
Skyline Acres CDP, Ohio – Racial and ethnic composition Note: the US Census treats Hispanic/Latino as an ethnic category. This table excludes Latinos from the racial categories and assigns them to a separate category. Hispanics/Latinos may be of any race.
Race / Ethnicity (NH = Non-Hispanic)	Pop 2010	Pop 2020	% 2010	% 2020
White alone (NH)	260	156	15.14%	10.79%
Black or African American alone (NH)	1,398	1,173	81.42%	81.12%
Native American or Alaska Native alone (NH)	3	6	0.17%	0.41%
Asian alone (NH)	5	2	0.29%	0.14%
Native Hawaiian or Pacific Islander alone (NH)	1	6	0.06%	0.41%
Other race alone (NH)	0	3	0.00%	0.21%
Mixed race or Multiracial (NH)	43	52	2.50%	3.60%
Hispanic or Latino (any race)	7	48	0.41%	3.32%
Total	1,717	1,446	100.00%	100.00%

As of the census of 2020, there were 1,446 people living in the CDP, for a population density of 2,430.25 people per square mile (938.07/km^{2}). There were 570 housing units. The racial makeup of the CDP was 11.5% White, 81.8% Black or African American, 1.0% Native American, 0.1% Asian, 0.4% Pacific Islander, 0.9% from some other race, and 0.5% from two or more races. 3.3% of the population were Hispanic or Latino of any race.

There were 531 households, out of which 39.7% had children under the age of 18 living with them, 17.1% were married couples living together, 13.0% had a male householder with no spouse present, and 61.2% had a female householder with no spouse present. 26.9% of all households were made up of individuals, and 25.6% were someone living alone who was 65 years of age or older. The average household size was 2.85, and the average family size was 3.65.

35.0% of the CDP's population were under the age of 18, 50.2% were 18 to 64, and 14.2% were 65 years of age or older. The median age was 31.1. For every 100 females, there were 84.3 males.

According to the U.S. Census American Community Survey, for the period 2016-2020 the estimated median annual income for a household in the CDP was $22,891, and the median income for a family was $22,630. About 56.2% of the population were living below the poverty line, including 80.4% of those under age 18 and 27.0% of those age 65 or over. About 48.9% of the population were employed, and 10.9% had a bachelor's degree or higher.
