= Colerain Township, Hamilton County, Ohio =

Township in Ohio, US

- Township
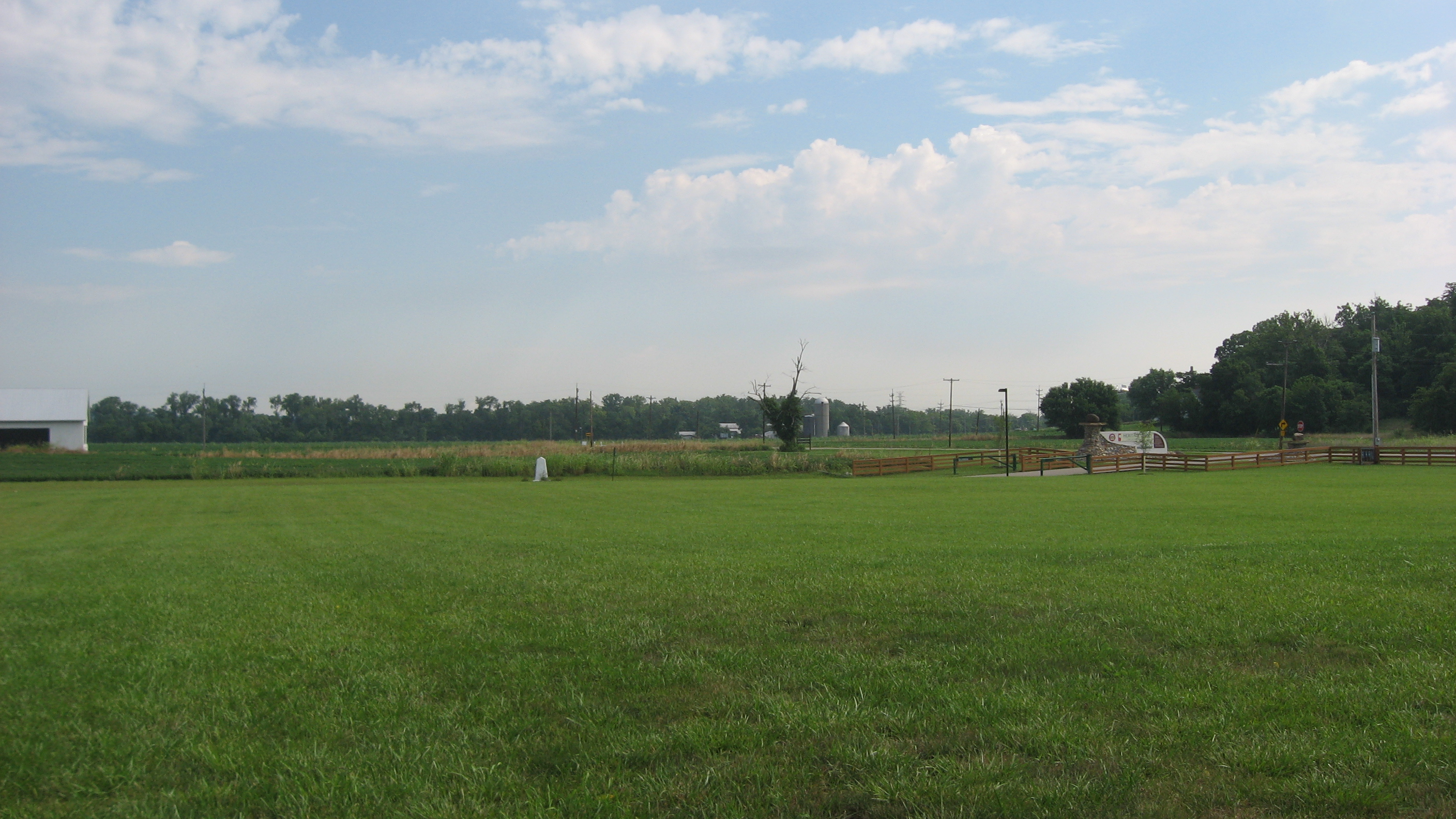
- Fields at Fort Dunlap

- Location in Hamilton County and the state of Ohio.
- Coordinates: 39°14′54″N 84°35′57″W
- Country: United States
- State: Ohio
- County: Hamilton

Area
  - Total: 43.2 sq mi (111.8 km^{2})
  - Land: 42.9 sq mi (111.0 km^{2})
  - Water: 0.35 sq mi (0.9 km^{2})
- Elevation: 850 ft (260 m)

Population (2020)
  - Total: 59,239
  - Density: 1,382/sq mi (533.7/km^{2})
- Time zone: UTC-5 (Eastern (EST))
  - Summer (DST): UTC-4 (EDT)
- ZIP codes: 45239, 45247, 45251, 45252, 45253 (P.O. Boxes only), also a small part of 45231
- Area code: 513
- FIPS code: 39-16616
- GNIS feature ID: 1086202
- Website: www.colerain.org

Colerain Township is one of the twelve townships of Hamilton County, Ohio, United States. The population of the township was 59,037 at the 2020 census.

== Name and history ==
Statewide, other Colerain Townships are located in Belmont and Ross counties. The village of Colerain was laid out in 1790 by surveyor John Dunlap, who was Scots-Irish and a native of the town Coleraine, in County Londonderry, Ireland. Fort Coleraine, aka Dunlap's Station, was one of the earliest attempts to settle the area despite the natives who had resided here for centuries without signing any land treaties.

The township was organized in 1794.

== Geography ==
Located in the northern part of the county, it borders the following townships and cities:

- Ross Township, Butler County - north
- Fairfield - northeast
- Springfield Township - east
- Forest Park - east, between sections of Springfield Township
- Cincinnati - southeast
- Green Township - south
- Miami Township - southwest
- Whitewater Township - west
- Crosby Township - northwest

The only municipality in Colerain Township is a small part of the city of North College Hill in the far southeast, but ten census-designated places occupy most of the township in the east

- Dry Ridge, in the center, north of Northgate
- Dunlap, in the north
- Groesbeck, in the southeast, north of White Oak
- Mount Healthy Heights, in the northeast, south of Pleasant Run
- Northbrook, in the east
- Northgate, in the center
- Pleasant Run, in the northeast
- Skyline Acres, in the southeast, also in bordering Springfield Township
- Taylor Creek, in the southwest
- White Oak, in the southeast. White Oak is situated in both Colerain and Green Townships.

The unincorporated communities of White Oak, Groesbeck, Northbrook, and Northgate are all within the township. White Oak is unique in its geography, in that it is part in Colerain Township and part in Green Township to the south.

The township is composed of 42.9 sq mi (111 km^{2}) of gentle wooded hills separating the Mill Creek and Great Miami River basins, sloping down to the flood plain of the Miami. The terrain generally rises toward the north of the township. As of 1990, 29% of the township's land had been urbanized, and 15% developed as agricultural property, while half remained as woodlands. The township is crossed by Interstates 74 and 275, while the main north–south artery is Colerain Avenue (U.S. Route 27).

== Demographics ==
Historical population
Census	Pop.	Note	%±
1820	1,906		—
1850	3,125		—
1860	3,933		25.9%
1870	3,689		−6.2%
1880	3,722		0.9%
1890	3,348		−10.0%
1900	3,410		1.9%
1910	3,034		−11.0%
1920	2,891		−4.7%
1930	3,664		26.7%
1940	4,627		26.3%
1950	7,473		61.5%
1960	28,632		283.1%
1970	50,971		78.0%
1980	56,583		11.0%
1990	56,781		0.3%
2000	60,144		5.9%
2010	58,499		−2.7%
2020	59,239		1.3%

=== 2020 census ===
As of the census of 2020, there were 59,239 people living in the township, for a population density of 1,380.86 people per square mile (533.68/km^{2}). There were 24,621 housing units. The racial makeup of the township was 66.1% White, 22.1% Black or African American, 0.3% Native American, 3.4% Asian, 0.1% Pacific Islander, 1.9% from some other race, and 6.0% from two or more races. 3.3% of the population were Hispanic or Latino of any race.

There were 22,838 households, out of which 31.8% had children under the age of 18 living with them, 46.8% were married couples living together, 16.1% had a male householder with no spouse present, and 29.6% had a female householder with no spouse present. 26.2% of all households were made up of individuals, and 10.5% were someone living alone who was 65 years of age or older. The average household size was 2.58, and the average family size was 3.07.

24.0% of the township's population were under the age of 18, 60.5% were 18 to 64, and 15.5% were 65 years of age or older. The median age was 39.0. For every 100 females, there were 94.8 males.

According to the U.S. Census American Community Survey, for the period 2016-2020 the estimated median annual income for a household in the township was $66,753, and the median income for a family was $79,805. About 10.4% of the population were living below the poverty line, including 18.7% of those under age 18 and 6.2% of those age 65 or over. About 63.8% of the population were employed, and 26.4% had a bachelor's degree or higher.

== Government ==
As with other townships in Ohio, the township is governed by a three-member board of trustees, who are elected in November of odd-numbered years to a four-year term beginning on the following January 1. Two are elected in the year after the presidential election and one is elected in the year before it. There is also an elected township fiscal officer, who serves a four-year term beginning on April 1 of the year after the election, which is held in November of the year before the presidential election. Vacancies in the fiscal officership or on the board of trustees are filled by the remaining trustees.

In 2010, Colerain Township adopted a limited home rule system of government.

Colerain Township has a sister city arrangement with Obergiesing, a suburb of the German city of Munich.

== Recreation ==
- Clippard Park
