= White Oak East, Ohio =

- Former CDP
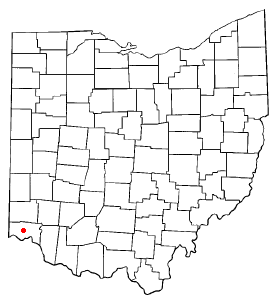
- Location of White Oak East, Ohio
- Coordinates: 39°12′8″N 84°35′24″W
- Country: United States
- State: Ohio
- County: Hamilton

Area
  - Total: 0.81 sq mi (2.1 km^{2})
  - Land: 0.81 sq mi (2.1 km^{2})
  - Water: 0 sq mi (0.0 km^{2})

Population (2000)
  - Total: 3,508
  - Density: 4,393/sq mi (1,696.2/km^{2})
- Time zone: UTC-5 (Eastern (EST))
  - Summer (DST): UTC-4 (EDT)
- FIPS code: 39-84831

White Oak East was a census-designated place (CDP) in Hamilton County, Ohio in the United States. The population was 3,508 at the 2000 census. As of the 2010 census it had been merged into the larger White Oak CDP.

== Geography ==
White Oak East was located at 39°12′8″N 84°35′24″W (39.202091, -84.590114).

According to the United States Census Bureau, the CDP had a total area of 0.8 square miles (2.1 km^{2}), all of it land.

== Demographics ==
As of the census of 2000, there were 3,508 people, 1,439 households, and 955 families residing in the CDP. The population density was 4,393.1 inhabitants per square mile (1,696.2/km^{2}). There were 1,491 housing units at an average density of 1,867.2 per square mile (720.9/km^{2}). The racial makeup of the CDP was 97.09% White, 1.23% African American, 0.23% Native American, 0.91% Asian, 0.26% from other races, and 0.29% from two or more races. Hispanic or Latino of any race were 0.46% of the population.

There were 1,439 households, out of which 29.3% had children under the age of 18 living with them, 55.3% were married couples living together, 7.9% had a female householder with no husband present, and 33.6% were non-families. 29.5% of all households were made up of individuals, and 13.6% had someone living alone who was 65 years of age or older. The average household size was 2.44 and the average family size was 3.07.

In the CDP, the population was spread out, with 23.3% under the age of 18, 7.7% from 18 to 24, 29.7% from 25 to 44, 19.7% from 45 to 64, and 19.6% who were 65 years of age or older. The median age was 38 years. For every 100 females, there were 90.2 males. For every 100 females age 18 and over, there were 87.8 males.

The median income for a household in the CDP was $54,643, and the median income for a family was $66,979. Males had a median income of $42,454 versus $27,296 for females. The per capita income for the CDP was $27,883. About 1.0% of families and 2.5% of the population were below the poverty line, including 1.3% of those under age 18 and 4.9% of those age 65 or over.
