= New Burlington, Hamilton County, Ohio =

New Burlington, Ohio
- Census-designated place
- Location in Hamilton County and the state of Ohio
- Coordinates: 39°15′48″N 84°33′25″W
- Country: United States
- State: Ohio
- County: Hamilton

Area
  - Total: 3.41 sq mi (8.84 km^{2})
  - Land: 3.41 sq mi (8.83 km^{2})
  - Water: 0 sq mi (0.00 km^{2})
- Elevation: 791 ft (241 m)

Population (2020)
  - Total: 5,049
  - Density: 1,480.2/sq mi (571.52/km^{2})
- Time zone: UTC-5 (Eastern (EST))
  - Summer (DST): UTC-4 (EDT)
- FIPS code: 39-54264
- GNIS feature ID: 2585517

New Burlington is a census-designated place (CDP) in Springfield Township, Hamilton County, Ohio, United States. The population was 5,049 at the 2020 census.

== History ==
New Burlington was laid out by John Pegg in 1816.

== Geography ==
New Burlington is located 12 miles (19 km) north of downtown Cincinnati. U.S. Route 127 (Hamilton Avenue) is the main road through the area, running north towards Hamilton and south through Mount Healthy into downtown Cincinnati. Neighbors of New Burlington include Forest Park to the north, Greenhills to the east, Mount Healthy to the south, Northbrook to the southwest, and Mount Healthy Heights to the west.

According to the United States Census Bureau, the CDP has a total area of 3.1 square miles (7.9 km^{2}), all land.

== Demographics ==
As of the census of 2020, there were 5,049 people living in the CDP, for a population density of 1,480.21 people per square mile (571.52/km^{2}). There were 2,028 housing units. The racial makeup of the CDP was 42.8% White, 45.5% Black or African American, 0.3% Native American, 2.3% Asian, 0.4% Pacific Islander, 2.8% from some other race, and 6.0% from two or more races. 4.8% of the population were Hispanic or Latino of any race.

There were 1,958 households, out of which 19.7% had children under the age of 18 living with them, 39.7% were married couples living together, 16.4% had a male householder with no spouse present, and 37.4% had a female householder with no spouse present. 32.5% of all households were made up of individuals, and 13.6% were someone living alone who was 65 years of age or older. The average household size was 2.35, and the average family size was 3.02.

21.1% of the CDP's population were under the age of 18, 54.2% were 18 to 64, and 24.7% were 65 years of age or older. The median age was 50.7. For every 100 females, there were 100.2 males.

According to the U.S. Census American Community Survey, for the period 2016-2020 the estimated median annual income for a household in the CDP was $53,857, and the median income for a family was $64,978. About 22.8% of the population were living below the poverty line, including 59.5% of those under age 18 and 12.1% of those age 65 or over. About 53.0% of the population were employed, and 21.1% had a bachelor's degree or higher.
