= Dunlap Archeological District =

Archaeological site in Ohio, United States

- U.S. National Register of Historic Places
- U.S. Historic district
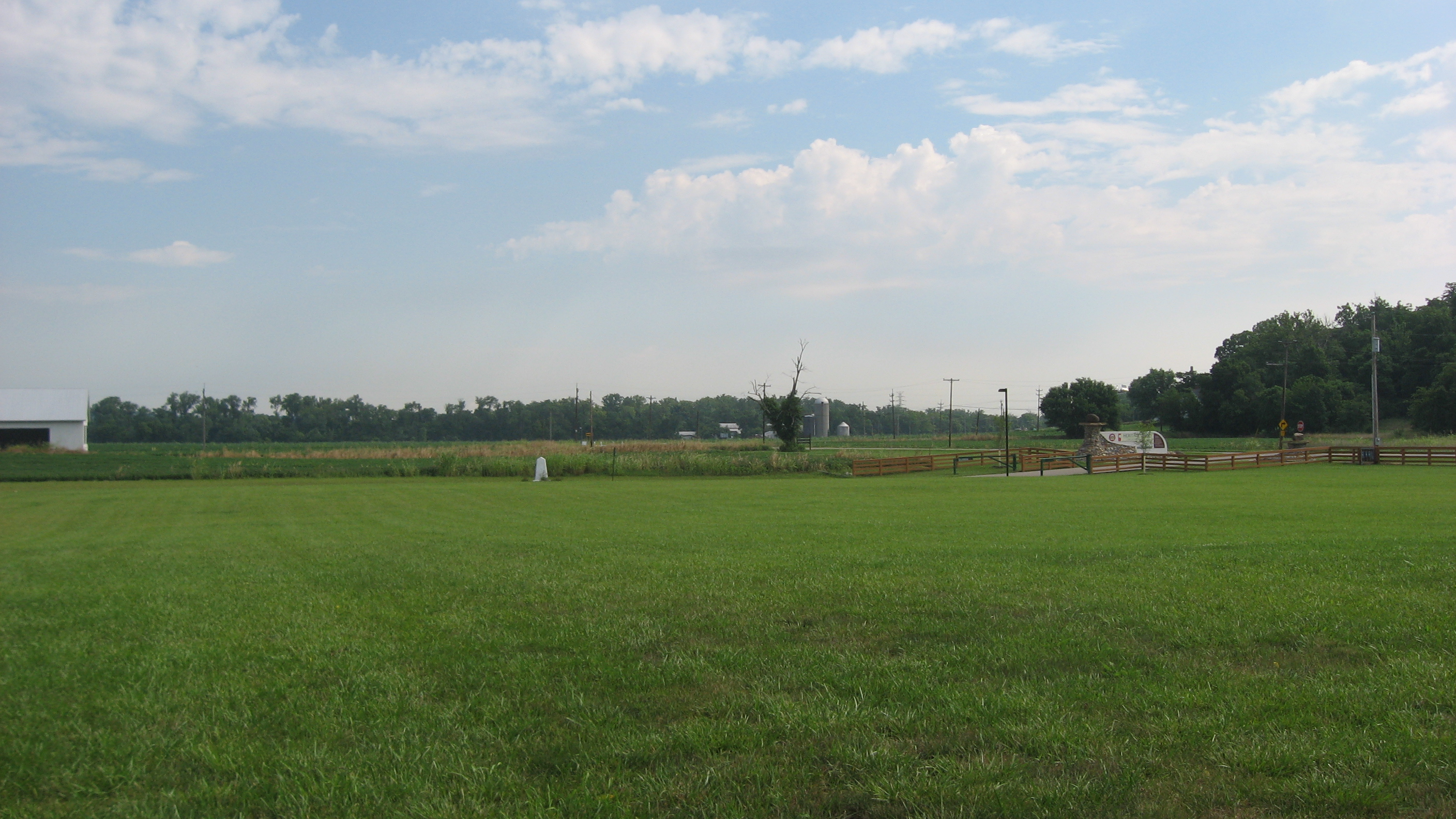
- Fields at the site
- Nearest city: Dunlap, Ohio
- Area: 39 acres (16 ha)
- NRHP reference No.: 75001421
- Added to NRHP: October 21, 1975

Dunlap Archeological District is a registered historic district near Dunlap, Ohio, listed in the National Register of Historic Places on October 21, 1975. It does not contain any contributing buildings.

== Historic uses ==
- Village Site
- Fortification
