= Northgate Mall (Ohio) =

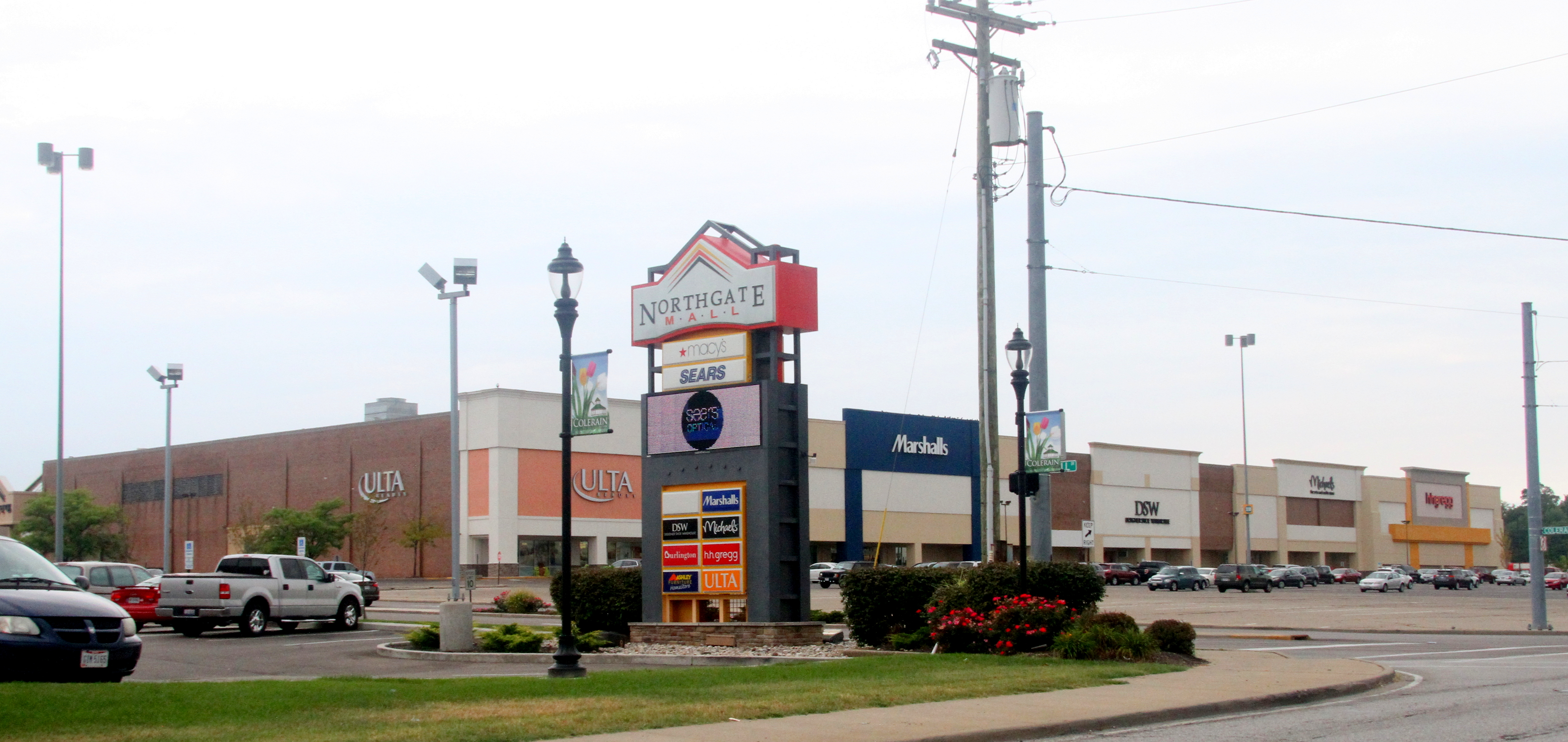
- Exterior view of Northgate Mall, September 2015
- Location: Cincinnati, Ohio, United States
- Coordinates: 39°14′41″N 84°35′57″W
- Address: 9501 Colerain Ave
- Opened: 1972
- Closed: September 14, 2026 (enclosed mall only)
- Developer: Northgate Mall Associates
- Owner: Tabani
- Num. of stores: 36
- Num. of anchor tenants: All vacant (2 at peak)
- Floor area: 915,956 sq ft (85,095.1 m^{2})
- Floors: 1 (2 in former Macy's, Sears, and JC Penny)
- Public transit: Metro

Northgate Mall is a defunct enclosed shopping mall in Northgate, Ohio.

== History ==
Construction on the mall began in 1970, on the site of a former airport. It opened on September 10, 1972, anchored by Sears, McAlpin's and Pogue's. The mall also included a Kroger supermarket. Pogue's became L. S. Ayres in 1984, and then J. C. Penney in 1988. Lazarus was added as a fourth anchor in 1993 and became Lazarus-Macy's in 2003 and then Macy's in 2005. Dillard's acquired McAlpin's in 1999, and that anchor store closed in 2009.

JCPenney closed their anchor store in 2006 and moved to a new location at Stone Creek Towne Center, just north of the mall property. The Pogue's/JCPenney anchor store was demolished in 2007 for construction of a 14-screen Rave multiplex movie theater, but construction on the theater never began, after the mall's then-owners defaulted on a $74 million loan.

In 2012, the mall was sold to Tabani Group. The vacant Dillard's anchor store was subdivided into four big-box stores in 2013 - DSW, Marshalls, Michaels, and Ulta. A space briefly occupied by Famous Labels in 2010 became Burlington Coat Factory in 2013. In 2014, an H. H. Gregg store was added in a new structure on the north side of the old Dillard's structure. That store closed in 2017. Ashley Furniture also opened in 2014, and closed in 2024 when a new Ashley opened nearby. In 2015, the site of the demolished JCPenney anchor was filled when an Xscape theater was built.

The Sears anchor store closed in November 2018, as part of a plan to close 46 stores nationwide, leaving Macy's as the sole remaining anchor.

In January 2020, Macy's announced that they would close in March 2020 as part of a plan to close 125 stores nationwide. This left the mall with no traditional anchor stores.

In October 2023, Marshalls moved to Stone Creek Towne Center, and in December of the same year the Xscape theater closed.

In June 2025, demolition began on the former Sears building.

In August 2026, several tenants at Northgate Mall were given notices requiring them to vacate the property by September 14. Tundra Realty had not publicly announced its plans for the property at that time. The remaining interior tenants were required to vacate Northgate Mall by September 14, 2026, effectively ending operations of the enclosed portion of the mall.
