= Dry Ridge, Ohio =

- Census-designated place
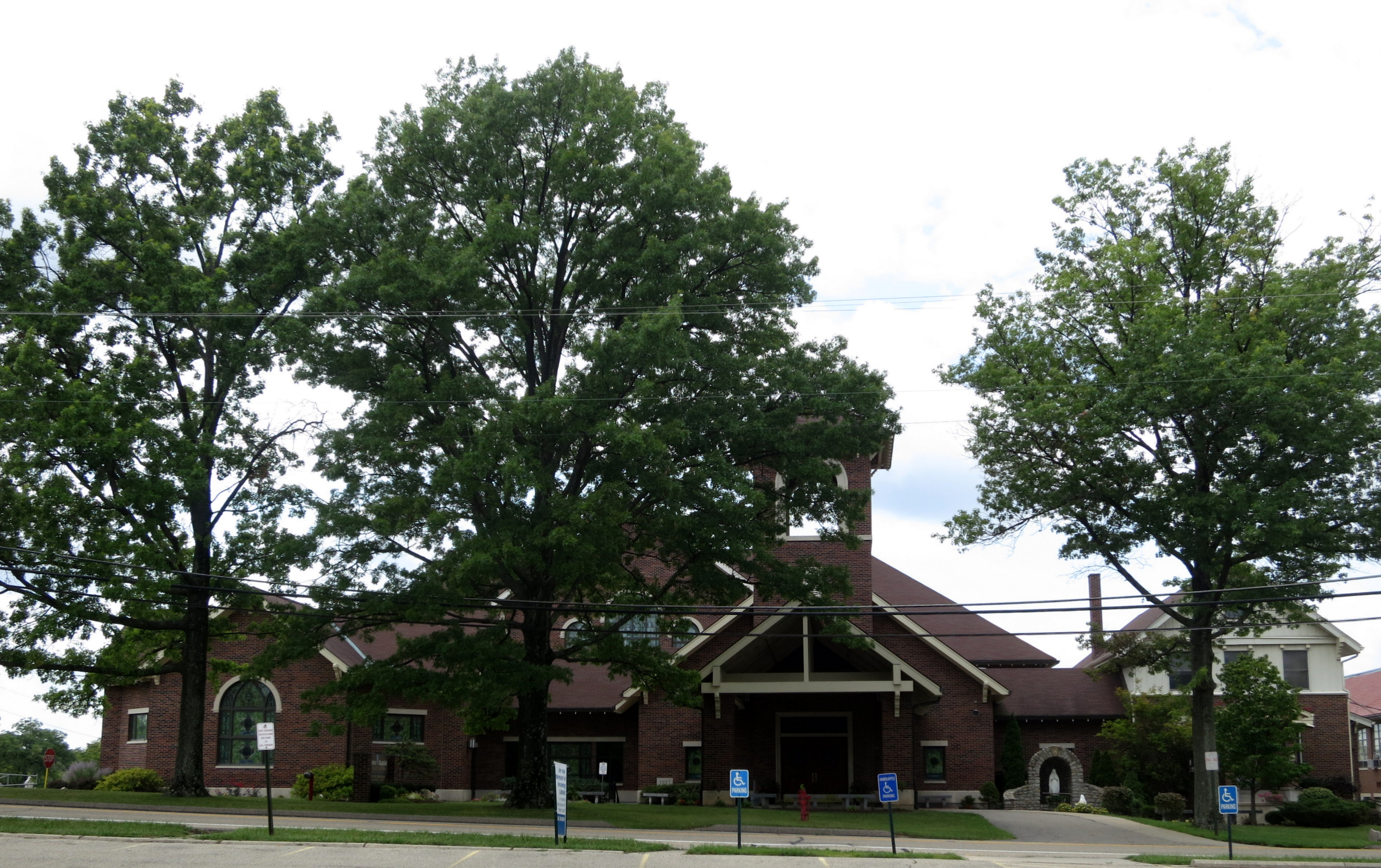
- St. John the Baptist Catholic Church in Dry Ridge

- Location in Hamilton County and the state of Ohio.
- Coordinates: 39°14′56″N 84°37′10″W
- Country: United States
- State: Ohio
- County: Hamilton

Area
  - Total: 4.15 sq mi (10.76 km^{2})
  - Land: 4.12 sq mi (10.68 km^{2})
  - Water: 0.027 sq mi (0.07 km^{2})
- Elevation: 810 ft (250 m)

Population (2020)
  - Total: 2,698
  - Density: 654.1/sq mi (252.55/km^{2})
- Time zone: UTC-5 (Eastern (EST))
  - Summer (DST): UTC-4 (EDT)
- FIPS code: 39-22660
- GNIS feature ID: 2585507

Dry Ridge is a census-designated place (CDP) in Colerain Township, Hamilton County, Ohio, United States. The population was 2,698 at the 2020 census.

== Geography ==
Dry Ridge is located 14 miles (23 km) northwest of downtown Cincinnati. Interstate 275 forms the southeastern edge of the CDP, and Colerain Avenue (U.S. Route 27) forms the eastern edge. Dry Ridge Road runs east–west through the CDP, which extends west to the Great Miami River.

According to the United States Census Bureau, the CDP has a total area of 4.1 square miles (10.7 km^{2}), all land.

== Demographics ==
As of the census of 2020, there were 2,698 people living in the CDP, for a population density of 654.06 people per square mile (252.55/km^{2}). There were 1,248 housing units. The racial makeup of the CDP was 85.8% White, 8.3% Black or African American, 0.1% Native American, 1.6% Asian, 0.0% Pacific Islander, 0.4% from some other race, and 3.9% from two or more races. 1.5% of the population were Hispanic or Latino of any race.

There were 1,149 households, out of which 27.0% had children under the age of 18 living with them, 52.0% were married couples living together, 14.1% had a male householder with no spouse present, and 28.6% had a female householder with no spouse present. 23.6% of all households were made up of individuals, and 6.7% were someone living alone who was 65 years of age or older. The average household size was 2.69, and the average family size was 3.05.

24.3% of the CDP's population were under the age of 18, 58.4% were 18 to 64, and 17.3% were 65 years of age or older. The median age was 39.6. For every 100 females, there were 92.0 males.

According to the U.S. Census American Community Survey, for the period 2016-2020 the estimated median annual income for a household in the CDP was $92,645, and the median income for a family was $98,214. About 6.2% of the population were living below the poverty line, including 1.2% of those under age 18 and 5.4% of those age 65 or over. About 58.6% of the population were employed, and 38.8% had a bachelor's degree or higher.
