= Turpin Hills, Ohio =

- Census-designated place
- Location in Hamilton County and the state of Ohio
- Coordinates: 39°06′32″N 84°22′40″W
- Country: United States
- State: Ohio
- County: Hamilton

Area
  - Total: 2.97 sq mi (7.69 km^{2})
  - Land: 2.97 sq mi (7.68 km^{2})
  - Water: 0.0039 sq mi (0.01 km^{2})
- Elevation: 646 ft (197 m)

Population (2020)
  - Total: 5,162
  - Density: 1,740.1/sq mi (671.87/km^{2})
- Time zone: UTC-5 (Eastern (EST))
  - Summer (DST): UTC-4 (EDT)
- FIPS code: 39-77840
- GNIS feature ID: 2393259

Turpin Hills is a census-designated place (CDP) in Anderson Township, Hamilton County, Ohio, United States. The population was 5,162 at the 2020 census.

== Geography ==
According to the United States Census Bureau, the CDP has a total area of 3.0 square miles (7.8 km^{2}), all land.

== Demographics ==
Historical population
Census	Pop.	Note	%±
2020	5,162		—
U.S. Decennial Census

=== 2020 census ===
As of the census of 2020, there were 5,162 people living in the CDP, for a population density of 1,740.39 people per square mile (671.87/km^{2}). There were 1,987 housing units. The racial makeup of the CDP was 90.1% White, 2.2% Black or African American, 0.1% Native American, 2.1% Asian, 0.0% Pacific Islander, 0.3% from some other race, and 5.2% from two or more races. 2.1% of the population were Hispanic or Latino of any race.

There were 1,847 households, out of which 53.5% had children under the age of 18 living with them, 76.3% had children under the age of 18 living with them, 13.9% had a male householder with no spouse present, and 7.4% had a female householder with no spouse present. 12.9% of all households were made up of individuals, and 2.6% were someone living alone who was 65 years of age or older. The average household size was 3.09, and the average family size was 3.46.

33.3% of the CDP's population were under the age of 18, 56.6% were 18 to 64, and 10.1% were 65 years of age or older. The median age was 39.1. For every 100 females, there were 124.0 males.

According to the U.S. Census American Community Survey, for the period 2016-2020 the estimated median annual income for a household in the CDP was $139,886, and the median income for a family was $165,781. About 1.1% of the population were living below the poverty line, including 0.0% of those under age 18 and 0.0% of those age 65 or over. About 72.6% of the population were employed, and 65.0% had a bachelor's degree or higher.

=== 2000 census ===
At the 2000 census there were 4,960 people, 1,741 households, and 1,448 families living in the CDP. The population density was 1,668.5 inhabitants per square mile (644.2/km^{2}). There were 1,810 housing units at an average density of 608.9 per square mile (235.1/km^{2}). The racial makeup of the CDP was 96.63% White, 0.62% African American, 0.34% Native American, 1.63% Asian, 0.30% from other races, and 0.46% from two or more races. Hispanic or Latino of any race were 1.07%.

Of the 1,741 households 42.7% had children under the age of 18 living with them, 75.0% were married couples living together, 6.1% had a female householder with no husband present, and 16.8% were non-families. 13.6% of households were one person and 4.0% were one person aged 65 or older. The average household size was 2.85 and the average family size was 3.16.

The age distribution was 30.6% under the age of 18, 5.3% from 18 to 24, 26.0% from 25 to 44, 29.2% from 45 to 64, and 9.0% 65 or older. The median age was 39 years. For every 100 females, there were 96.3 males. For every 100 females age 18 and over, there were 93.1 males.

The median household income was $84,354 and the median family income was $93,471. Males had a median income of $63,077 versus $36,795 for females. The per capita income for the CDP was $39,094. About 0.4% of families and 1.0% of the population were below the poverty line, including 0.5% of those under age 18 and 1.8% of those age 65 or over.
