= Taylor Creek, Ohio =

- Census-designated place
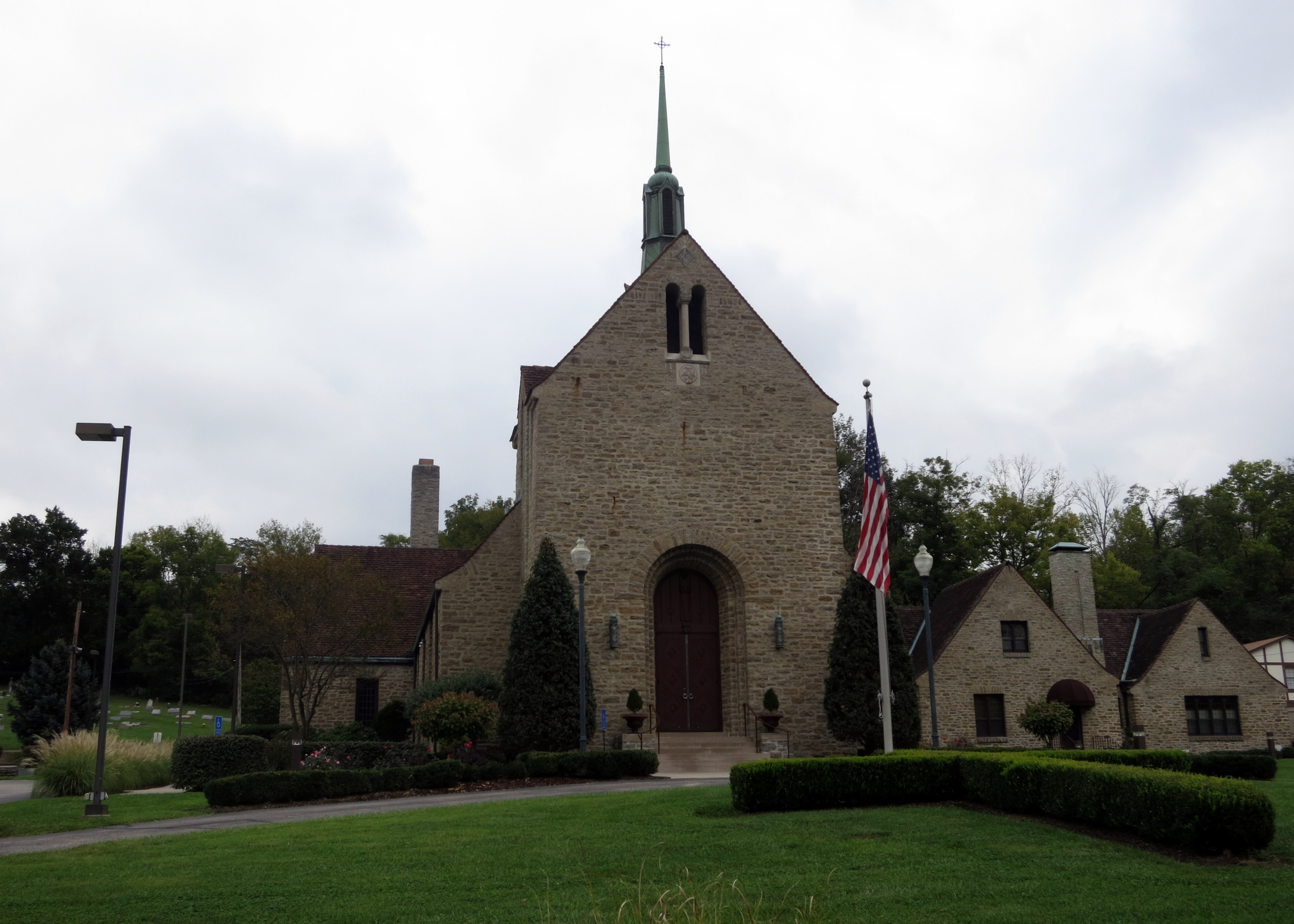
- Saint Bernard of Clairvaux Church is on Harrison Avenue in Taylor Creek

- Location in Hamilton County and the state of Ohio
- Coordinates: 39°14′51″N 84°40′49″W
- Country: United States
- State: Ohio
- County: Hamilton

Area
  - Total: 8.74 sq mi (22.63 km^{2})
  - Land: 8.57 sq mi (22.20 km^{2})
  - Water: 0.17 sq mi (0.43 km^{2})
- Elevation: 778 ft (237 m)

Population (2020)
  - Total: 4,056
  - Density: 473.2/sq mi (182.71/km^{2})
- Time zone: UTC-5 (Eastern (EST))
  - Summer (DST): UTC-4 (EDT)
- FIPS code: 39-76197
- GNIS feature ID: 2585529

Taylor Creek is a census-designated place (CDP) in Colerain Township, Hamilton County, Ohio, United States. The population was 4,056 at the 2020 census.

== History ==
Taylor Creek was originally known as Sheartown in the 19th century.

== Geography ==
Taylor Creek is located 15 miles (24 km) northwest of downtown Cincinnati. It occupies the southwestern portion of Colerain Township, bounded on the west and north by the Great Miami River.

According to the United States Census Bureau, the CDP has a total area of 8.4 square miles (21.8 km^{2}). This area was all land.

== Demographics ==
Historical population
Census	Pop.	Note	%±
2020	4,056		—
U.S. Decennial Census

=== 2020 census ===
As of the 2020 census, Taylor Creek had a population of 4,056. The population density was 473.22 people per square mile (182.71/km^{2}). The median age was 39.9 years. 24.0% of residents were under the age of 18 and 16.3% were 65 years of age or older. For every 100 females, there were 100.6 males, and for every 100 females age 18 and over, there were 97.2 males.

80.4% of residents lived in urban areas, while 19.6% lived in rural areas.

There were 1,598 households in Taylor Creek, of which 31.4% had children under the age of 18 living in them. Of all households, 57.1% were married-couple households, 17.1% were households with a male householder and no spouse or partner present, and 19.3% were households with a female householder and no spouse or partner present. About 24.3% of all households were made up of individuals, and 7.6% had someone living alone who was 65 years of age or older. The average household size was 2.55, and the average family size was 2.94.

There were 1,671 housing units, of which 4.4% were vacant. The homeowner vacancy rate was 1.2% and the rental vacancy rate was 4.3%.

Racial composition as of the 2020 census
Race	Number	Percent
White	3,468	85.5%
Black or African American	340	8.4%
American Indian and Alaska Native	3	0.1%
Asian	41	1.0%
Native Hawaiian and Other Pacific Islander	0	0.0%
Some other race	26	0.6%
Two or more races	178	4.4%
Hispanic or Latino (of any race)	69	1.7%

=== Income and poverty ===
According to the U.S. Census American Community Survey, for the period 2016-2020 the estimated median annual income for a household in the CDP was $84,962, and the median income for a family was $102,417. About 2.4% of the population were living below the poverty line, including 2.3% of those under age 18 and 1.3% of those age 65 or over. About 68.3% of the population were employed, and 33.9% had a bachelor's degree or higher.
