= Clippard Park =

Park in Ohio, United States

Coordinates: 39.259°N 84.593°W

Clippard Park is located near Cincinnati, Colerain Township, Ohio.

== Re-opening ==
Clippard re-opened on September 18, 2010 In January 2008, the township held the first of several public meetings at a local elementary school to find out from residents what they would like to have at the new Clippard Park. Clippard has been upgraded from antiquated play equipment, three poor ball fields, one small shelter and no restroom or fountains construction for the park started in July 2009. Now after the reconstruction Clippard park now has a sprayground, a basketball court, two ball fields, a paved walking trail, a nature trail, three shelter houses, four shade umbrellas, two bathroom buildings, five drinking fountains, a doggie fountain, a new paved vehicle entry road, parking lots and landscaping. A Tony Hawk Foundation grant in the amount of $5,000 helped with the funding of the Grindline Skateparks-designed facility. The skate park design was reviewed and approved by professional skater and designer Tony Hawk.

== Results ==
The new and improved Clippard Park has drawn increased patrons to enjoy the many diverse facilities at the park. User evaluations have all rated the park and its amenities as either highly satisfied or extremely satisfied. Instrument Skate Board, a professional skate team, has indicated that the skate park is the best skate park for both vertical and street skaters in the region.
