= Northgate, Ohio =

- Census-designated place
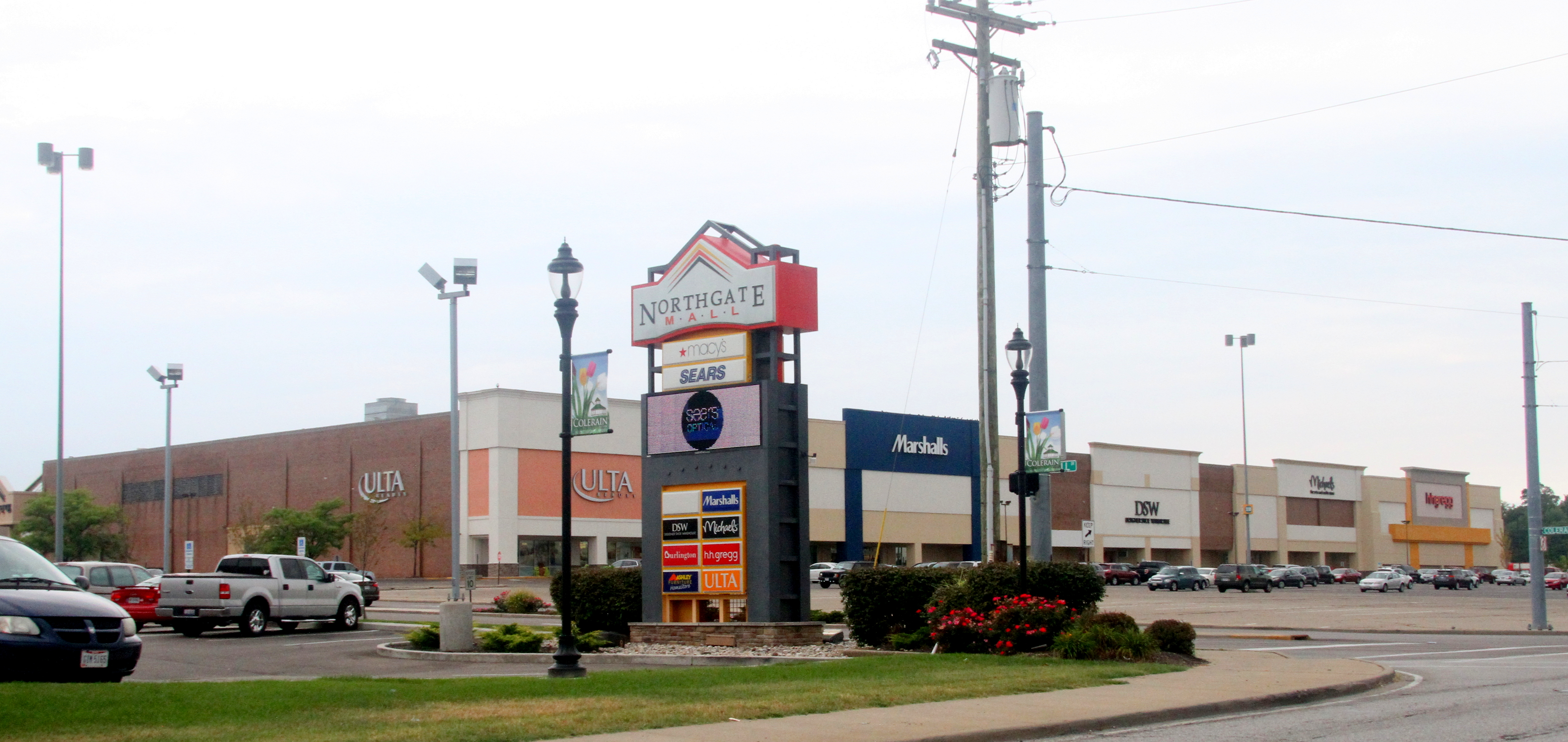
- Northgate Mall

- Location in Hamilton County and the state of Ohio
- Coordinates: 39°14′52″N 84°35′54″W
- Country: United States
- State: Ohio
- County: Hamilton
- Township: Colerain

Area
  - Total: 2.55 sq mi (6.60 km^{2})
  - Land: 2.53 sq mi (6.54 km^{2})
  - Water: 0.023 sq mi (0.06 km^{2})
- Elevation: 876 ft (267 m)

Population (2020)
  - Total: 7,277
  - Density: 2,880.7/sq mi (1,112.25/km^{2})
- Time zone: UTC-5 (Eastern (EST))
  - Summer (DST): UTC-4 (EDT)
- FIPS code: 39-56553
- GNIS feature ID: 2393158

Northgate is a census-designated place (CDP) in Colerain Township, Hamilton County, Ohio, United States. The population was 7,277 at the 2020 census.

Northgate Mall serves as a shopping hub for the west side of Cincinnati.

== Geography ==
According to the United States Census Bureau, the CDP has a total area of 2.5 square miles (6.5 km^{2}), of which 2.5 square miles (6.5 km^{2}) is land and 0.04 square miles (0.10 km^{2}), or 0.79%, is water.

== Demographics ==
Historical population
Census	Pop.	Note	%±
2020	7,277		—
U.S. Decennial Census

=== 2020 census ===
As of the census of 2020, there were 7,277 people living in the CDP, for a population density of 2,880.84 people per square mile (1,112.25/km^{2}). There were 2,853 housing units. The racial makeup of the CDP was 66.1% White, 21.3% Black or African American, 0.4% Native American, 4.4% Asian, 0.4% Pacific Islander, 1.4% from some other race, and 6.0% from two or more races. 3.2% of the population were Hispanic or Latino of any race.

There were 2,568 households, out of which 27.8% had children under the age of 18 living with them, 48.9% were married couples living together, 14.8% had a male householder with no spouse present, and 29.7% had a female householder with no spouse present. 29.7% of all households were made up of individuals, and 18.8% were someone living alone who was 65 years of age or older. The average household size was 2.38, and the average family size was 2.91.

21.3% of the CDP's population were under the age of 18, 56.0% were 18 to 64, and 22.7% were 65 years of age or older. The median age was 42.6. For every 100 females, there were 90.0 males.

According to the U.S. Census American Community Survey, for the period 2016-2020 the estimated median annual income for a household in the CDP was $60,192, and the median income for a family was $77,500. About 12.3% of the population were living below the poverty line, including 22.4% of those under age 18 and 17.3% of those age 65 or over. About 59.5% of the population were employed, and 18.4% had a bachelor's degree or higher.

=== 2000 census ===
At the 2000 census there were 8,016 people, 2,747 households, and 2,214 families living in the CDP. The population density was 3,178.6 inhabitants per square mile (1,227.3/km^{2}). There were 2,805 housing units at an average density of 1,112.3 per square mile (429.5/km^{2}). The racial makeup of the CDP was 86.22% White, 10.37% African American, 0.09% Native American, 1.31% Asian, 0.07% Pacific Islander, 0.64% from other races, and 1.31% from two or more races. Hispanic or Latino of any race were 1.43%.

Of the 2,747 households 39.3% had children under the age of 18 living with them, 65.4% were married couples living together, 10.8% had a female householder with no husband present, and 19.4% were non-families. 16.5% of households were one person and 7.7% were one person aged 65 or older. The average household size was 2.87 and the average family size was 3.21.

The age distribution was 27.4% under the age of 18, 8.3% from 18 to 24, 29.9% from 25 to 44, 23.1% from 45 to 64, and 11.4% 65 or older. The median age was 36 years. For every 100 females, there were 98.4 males. For every 100 females age 18 and over, there were 95.7 males.

The median household income was $52,872 and the median family income was $60,000. Males had a median income of $38,558 versus $26,943 for females. The per capita income for the CDP was $21,799. About 2.7% of families and 3.7% of the population were below the poverty line, including 4.5% of those under age 18 and 7.3% of those age 65 or over.
