= Mount Healthy Heights, Ohio =

- Census-designated place
- Location in Hamilton County and the state of Ohio
- Coordinates: 39°16′13″N 84°34′09″W
- Country: United States
- State: Ohio
- County: Hamilton

Area
  - Total: 0.74 sq mi (1.92 km^{2})
  - Land: 0.73 sq mi (1.90 km^{2})
  - Water: 0.0039 sq mi (0.01 km^{2})
- Elevation: 853 ft (260 m)

Population (2020)
  - Total: 2,918
  - Density: 3,974.6/sq mi (1,534.62/km^{2})
- Time zone: UTC-5 (Eastern (EST))
  - Summer (DST): UTC-4 (EDT)
- ZIP code: 45231
- Area codes: 283 and 513
- FIPS code: 39-52780
- GNIS feature ID: 2393139

Mount Healthy Heights is a census-designated place (CDP) in Colerain Township, Hamilton County, Ohio, United States. The population was 2,918 at the 2020 census.

== Geography ==
According to the United States Census Bureau, the CDP has a total area of 0.8 square mile (2.0 km^{2}), all land.

== Demographics ==
Historical population
Census	Pop.	Note	%±
2020	2,918		—
U.S. Decennial Census

=== 2020 census ===
As of the census of 2020, there were 2,918 people living in the CDP, for a population density of 3,975.48 people per square mile (1,534.62/km^{2}). There were 1,409 housing units. The racial makeup of the CDP was 49.8% White, 36.2% Black or African American, 0.1% Native American, 3.6% Asian, 0.1% Pacific Islander, 2.7% from some other race, and 7.4% from two or more races. 4.7% of the population were Hispanic or Latino of any race.

There were 1,081 households, out of which 53.3% had children under the age of 18 living with them, 50.5% were married couples living together, 11.8% had a male householder with no spouse present, and 34.1% had a female householder with no spouse present. 14.3% of all households were made up of individuals, and 4.6% were someone living alone who was 65 years of age or older. The average household size was 3.29, and the average family size was 3.70.

45.6% of the CDP's population were under the age of 18, 48.1% were 18 to 64, and 6.3% were 65 years of age or older. The median age was 27.0. For every 100 females, there were 98.1 males.

According to the U.S. Census American Community Survey, for the period 2016-2020 the estimated median annual income for a household in the CDP was $56,042, and the median income for a family was $73,220. About 24.5% of the population were living below the poverty line, including 37.0% of those under age 18 and 0.0% of those age 65 or over. About 73.8% of the population were employed, and 25.5% had a bachelor's degree or higher.

=== 2000 census ===
As of the census of 2000, there were 3,450 people, 1,281 households, and 959 families living in the CDP. The population density was 4,489.7 inhabitants per square mile (1,733.5/km^{2}). There were 1,320 housing units at an average density of 1,717.8 per square mile (663.2/km^{2}). The racial makeup of the CDP was 73.28% White, 23.33% African American, 0.09% Native American, 1.22% Asian, 0.55% from other races, and 1.54% from two or more races. Hispanic or Latino of any race were 0.99% of the population.

There were 1,281 households, out of which 38.5% had children under the age of 18 living with them, 53.6% were married couples living together, 15.8% had a female householder with no husband present, and 25.1% were non-families. 18.3% of all households were made up of individuals, and 3.5% had someone living alone who was 65 years of age or older. The average household size was 2.69 and the average family size was 3.08.

In the CDP, the population was spread out, with 27.3% under the age of 18, 11.3% from 18 to 24, 33.7% from 25 to 44, 21.5% from 45 to 64, and 6.2% who were 65 years of age or older. The median age was 31 years. For every 100 females, there were 95.5 males. For every 100 females age 18 and over, there were 91.5 males.

The median income for a household in the CDP was $45,245, and the median income for a family was $49,929. Males had a median income of $32,750 versus $25,101 for females. The per capita income for the CDP was $20,726. About 2.5% of families and 4.2% of the population were below the poverty line, including 7.4% of those under age 18 and 7.8% of those age 65 or over.
