= Groesbeck, Ohio =

- Census-designated place
- Location in Hamilton County and the state of Ohio.
- Coordinates: 39°13′53″N 84°36′30″W
- Country: United States
- State: Ohio
- County: Hamilton

Area
  - Total: 2.93 sq mi (7.60 km^{2})
  - Land: 2.93 sq mi (7.60 km^{2})
  - Water: 0 sq mi (0.00 km^{2})
- Elevation: 866 ft (264 m)

Population (2020)
  - Total: 7,365
  - Density: 2,510.8/sq mi (969.44/km^{2})
- Time zone: UTC-5 (Eastern (EST))
  - Summer (DST): UTC-4 (EDT)
- Area code: 513
- FIPS code: 39-32536
- GNIS feature ID: 2393033

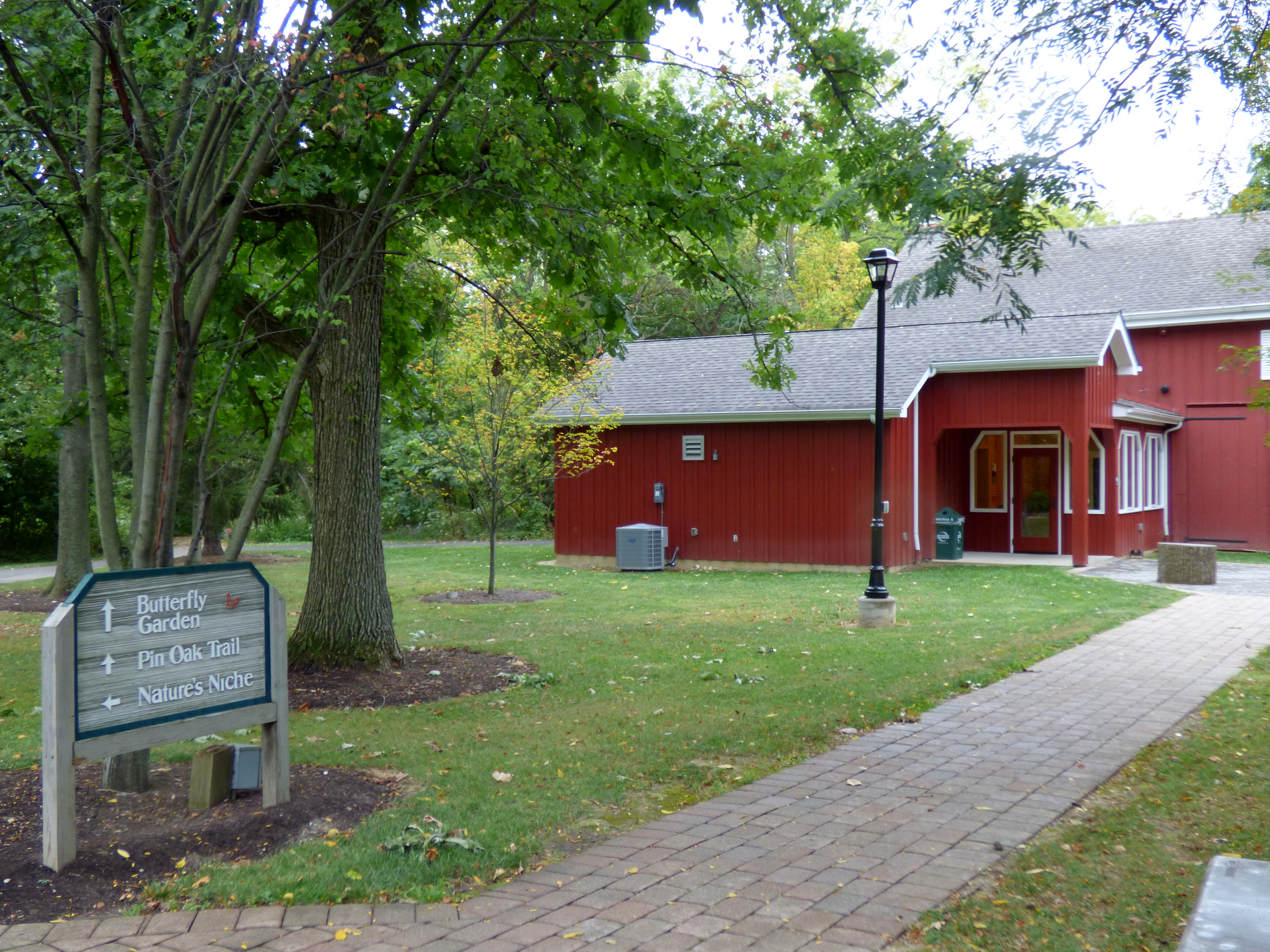
Farbach-Werner Nature Preserve in Groesbeck, Ohio

Groesbeck is a census-designated place (CDP) in Colerain Township, Hamilton County, Ohio, United States. The population was 7,365 at the 2020 census. It is a suburb of Cincinnati.

== History ==
Groesbeck was founded as West Union. When the community established a post office in 1857 it was discovered there was already a West Union in Ohio and so the name was changed. The new name was taken from the surname of William S. Groesbeck, a United States Representative from Ohio.

In 1894, Groesbeck was described as having two hotels, a blacksmith shop, and a church.

== Geography ==
According to the United States Census Bureau, the CDP has a total area of 2.9 square miles (7.5 km^{2}), all land.

== Demographics ==
Historical population
Census	Pop.	Note	%±
2020	7,365		—
U.S. Decennial Census

=== 2020 census ===
As of the census of 2020, there were 7,365 people living in the CDP, for a population density of 2,511.08 people per square mile (969.44/km^{2}). There were 3,069 housing units. The racial makeup of the CDP was 66.9% White, 20.5% Black or African American, 0.4% Native American, 3.4% Asian, 0.0% Pacific Islander, 2.3% from some other race, and 6.4% from two or more races. 3.7% of the population were Hispanic or Latino of any race.

There were 3,233 households, out of which 31.5% had children under the age of 18 living with them, 41.4% were married couples living together, 16.2% had a male householder with no spouse present, and 33.4% had a female householder with no spouse present. 33.4% of all households were made up of individuals, and 9.3% were someone living alone who was 65 years of age or older. The average household size was 2.51, and the average family size was 3.13.

22.5% of the CDP's population were under the age of 18, 64.6% were 18 to 64, and 12.9% were 65 years of age or older. The median age was 33.8. For every 100 females, there were 83.0 males.

According to the U.S. Census American Community Survey, for the period 2016-2020 the estimated median annual income for a household in the CDP was $63,193, and the median income for a family was $74,959. About 4.3% of the population were living below the poverty line, including 4.6% of those under age 18 and 5.1% of those age 65 or over. About 65.8% of the population were employed, and 22.4% had a bachelor's degree or higher.

=== 2000 census ===
As of the census of 2000, there were 7,202 people, 2,771 households, and 1,986 families residing in the CDP. The population density was 2,451.1 inhabitants per square mile (946.4/km^{2}). There were 2,857 housing units at an average density of 972.3 per square mile (375.4/km^{2}). The racial makeup of the CDP was 91.92% White, 5.67% African American, 0.07% Native American, 0.67% Asian, 0.03% Pacific Islander, 0.33% from other races, and 1.32% from two or more races. Hispanic or Latino of any race were 0.60% of the population.

There were 2,771 households, out of which 36.1% had children under the age of 18 living with them, 56.0% were married couples living together, 11.7% had a female householder with no husband present, and 28.3% were non-families. 24.5% of all households were made up of individuals, and 11.2% had someone living alone who was 65 years of age or older. The average household size was 2.60 and the average family size was 3.11.

In the CDP, the population was spread out, with 27.7% under the age of 18, 8.1% from 18 to 24, 29.0% from 25 to 44, 20.0% from 45 to 64, and 15.3% who were 65 years of age or older. The median age was 36 years. For every 100 females, there were 96.0 males. For every 100 females age 18 and over, there were 88.0 males.

The median income for a household in the CDP was $49,253, and the median income for a family was $56,843. Males had a median income of $40,323 versus $27,825 for females. The per capita income for the CDP was $21,525. About 4.9% of families and 5.6% of the population were below the poverty line, including 5.8% of those under age 18 and 6.8% of those age 65 or over.
