= Dunlap, Ohio =

- Census-designated place
- Location in Hamilton County and the state of Ohio.
- Coordinates: 39°17′26″N 84°37′35″W
- Country: United States
- State: Ohio
- County: Hamilton

Area
  - Total: 6.66 sq mi (17.26 km^{2})
  - Land: 6.53 sq mi (16.91 km^{2})
  - Water: 0.13 sq mi (0.34 km^{2})
- Elevation: 653 ft (199 m)

Population (2020)
  - Total: 1,658
  - Density: 253.9/sq mi (98.02/km^{2})
- Time zone: UTC−5 (Eastern (EST))
  - Summer (DST): UTC−4 (EDT)
- FIPS code: 39-22960
- GNIS feature ID: 2585508

Dunlap is a census-designated place (CDP) in Colerain Township, Hamilton County, Ohio, United States. The population was 1,658 at the 2020 census. The siege of Dunlap's Station was a battle that took place near here on the Great Miami in 1791 during the Northwest Indian War.

== History ==
A large part of Dunlap was originally owned by William and Asher Williamson. They sold their land in 1849 to a Mr. Parker who platted a number of lots along the Colerain Pike and Hamilton Road. In 1850, Oliver S. Glisson, an officer in the United States Navy, hired attorney Thomas S. Yeatman to lay out a subdivision south of the village on the farm of Glisson's recently deceased father. George Struble built several of the first houses in the village on his farmland east of the pike. The village was originally named Georgetown in his honor.

The first business established was a blacksmith shop. Asher Williamson kept the first store and George Struble the first hotel. The Dunlap post office, which had operated out of a cotton factory elsewhere in Colerain Township, was moved to the village. As a result, Dunlap became the de facto name the village. By 1894, there were two churches, a schoolhouse, several stores and industries.

== Geography ==
Dunlap is located 15 miles (24 km) north of downtown Cincinnati. U.S. Route 27 runs through the eastern part of the CDP, and Colerain Avenue is the main road through the center of the community.

According to the United States Census Bureau, the CDP has a total area of 6.7 square miles (17.3 km^{2}), of which 6.5 square miles (16.9 km^{2}) is land and 0.15 square miles (0.4 km^{2}), or 2.39%, is water.

== Demographics ==
As of the census of 2020, there were 1,658 people living in the CDP, for a population density of 253.87 people per square mile (98.02/km^{2}). There were 695 housing units. The racial makeup of the CDP was 93.3% White, 1.6% Black or African American, 0.1% Native American, 0.5% Asian, 0.0% Pacific Islander, 0.4% from some other race, and 4.2% from two or more races. 1.0% of the population were Hispanic or Latino of any race.

There were 559 households, out of which 25.4% had children under the age of 18 living with them, 74.1% were married couples living together, 18.2% had a male householder with no spouse present, and 6.3% had a female householder with no spouse present. 14.1% of all households were made up of individuals, and 5.9% were someone living alone who was 65 years of age or older. The average household size was 2.31, and the average family size was 2.51.

13.3% of the CDP's population were under the age of 18, 63.8% were 18 to 64, and 22.9% were 65 years of age or older. The median age was 55.8. For every 100 females, there were 132.9 males.

According to the U.S. Census American Community Survey, for the period 2016-2020 the estimated median annual income for a household in the CDP was $95,125, and the median income for a family was $113,125. About 14.4% of the population were living below the poverty line, including 27.5% of those under age 18 and 4.4% of those age 65 or over. About 56.2% of the population were employed, and 39.1% had a bachelor's degree or higher.
