= Hamilton County, Ohio =

County in Ohio, United States

- County
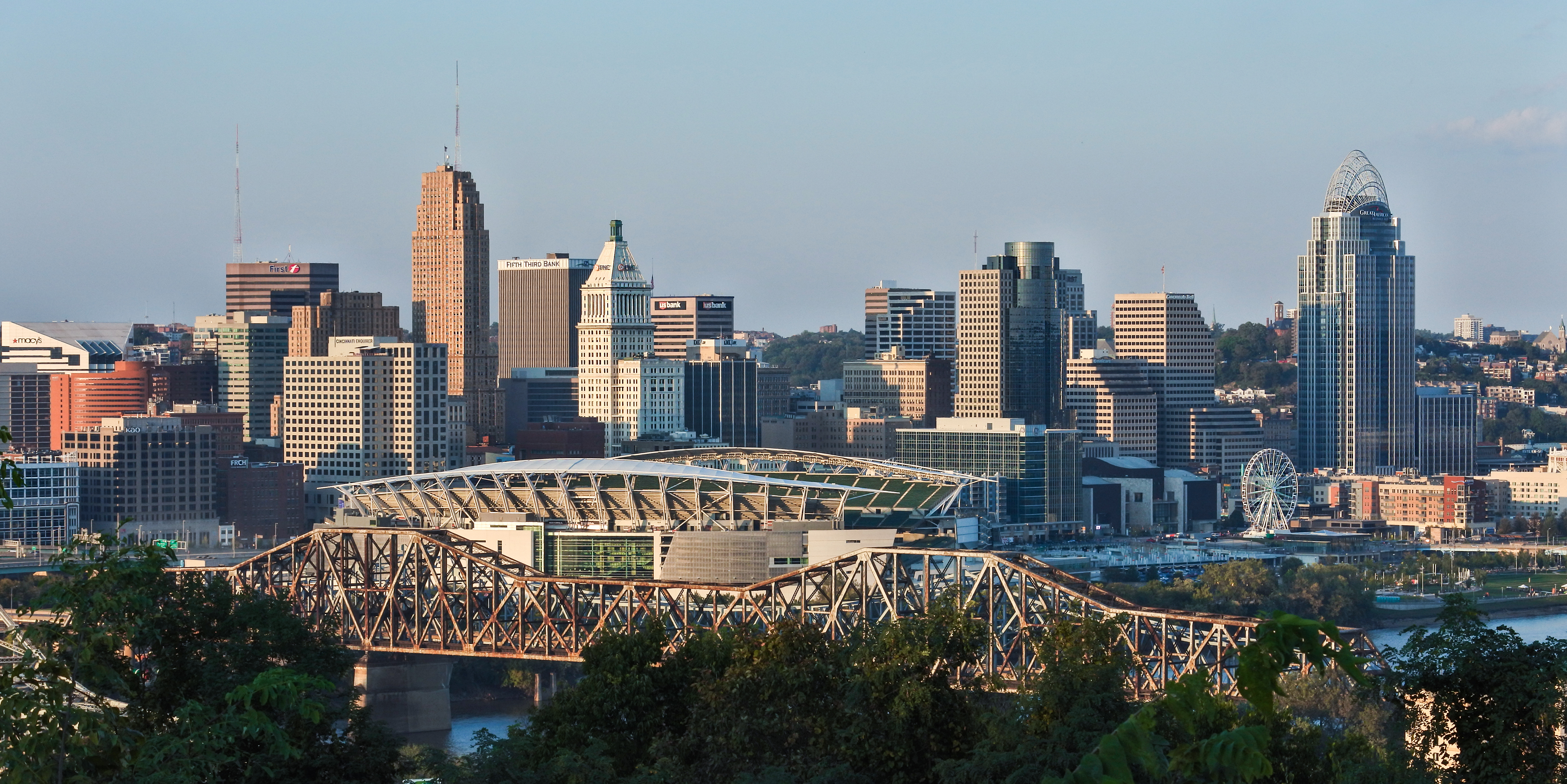
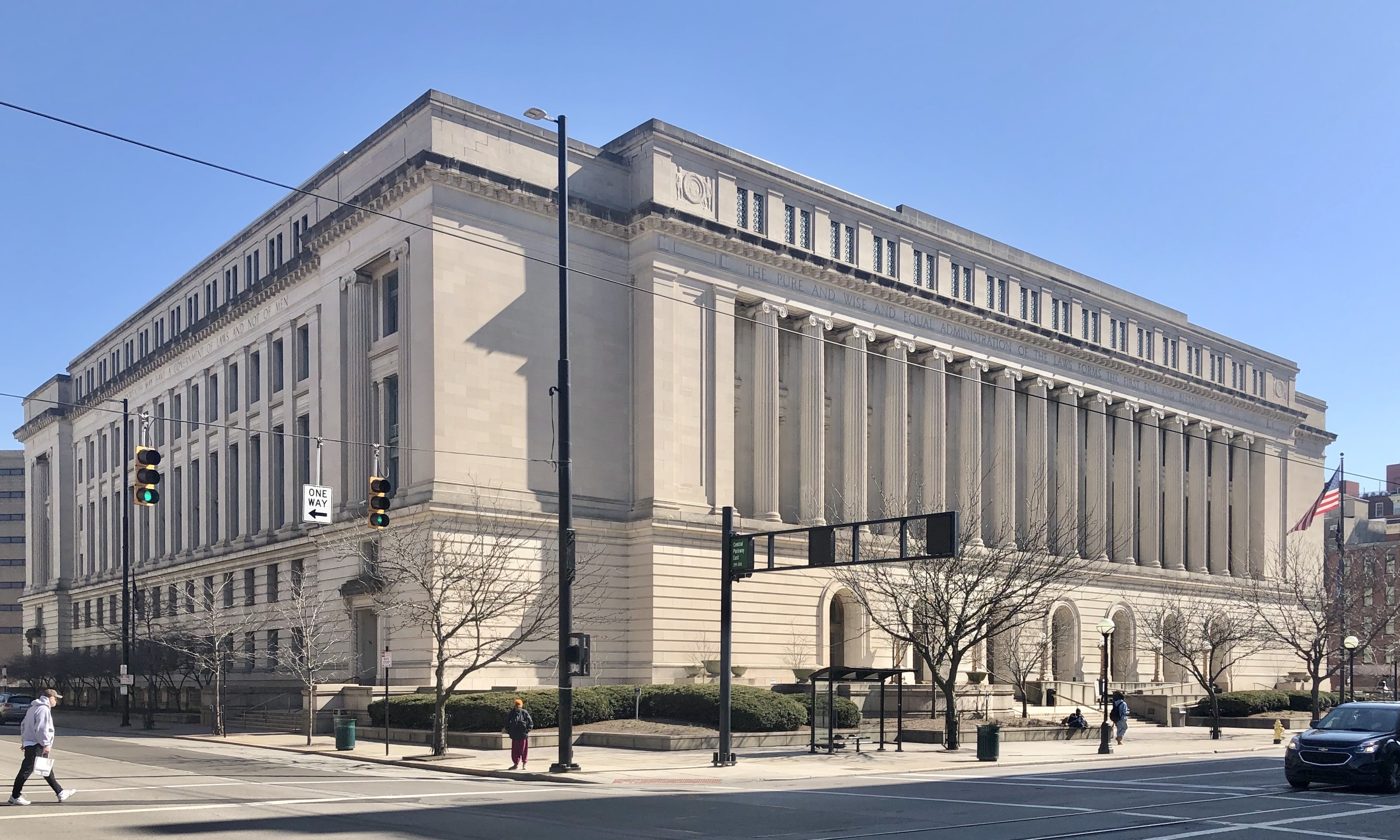
- Cincinnati Hamilton County Courthouse

- Flag Seal Logo

- Location within the U.S. state of Ohio
- Coordinates: 39°12′N 84°32′W
- Country: United States
- State: Ohio
- Founded: January 2, 1790
- Named for: Alexander Hamilton
- Seat: Cincinnati
- Largest city: Cincinnati

Area
  - Total: 413 sq mi (1,070 km^{2})
  - Land: 406 sq mi (1,050 km^{2})
  - Water: 6.7 sq mi (17 km^{2}) 1.6%

Population (2020)
  - Total: 830,639
  - Estimate (2025): 838,418 ▲
  - Density: 2,050/sq mi (790/km^{2})
- Time zone: UTC−5 (Eastern)
  - Summer (DST): UTC−4 (EDT)
- Congressional districts: 1st, 8th
- Website: www.hamiltoncountyohio.gov

Hamilton County is located in the southwestern corner of the U.S. state of Ohio. As of the 2020 census, the population was 830,639, making it the third-most populous county in Ohio. The county seat and most populous city is Cincinnati. The county is named for the first Secretary of the Treasury, Alexander Hamilton. Hamilton County is part of the Cincinnati–Middletown, OH–KY–IN Metropolitan Statistical Area.

== History ==
The southern portion of Hamilton County was originally owned and surveyed by John Cleves Symmes, and the region was a part of the Symmes Purchase. The first settlers rafted down the Ohio River in 1788 following the American Revolutionary War. They established the towns of Losantiville (later Cincinnati), North Bend, and Columbia.

Hamilton County was organized in 1790 by order of Arthur St. Clair, governor of the Northwest Territory, as the second county in the Northwest Territory. Cincinnati was named as the seat. Residents named the county in honor of Alexander Hamilton, who was the first Secretary of the Treasury of the United States and a founder of the Federalist Party. Its original boundaries were those defined for the Symmes purchase contract in 1788: the Ohio River in the South, Great Miami River to the west, the Lesser Miami River to the east, and the Cuyahoga River to the North. Its area then included about one-eighth of Ohio and had about 2,000 inhabitants (not including the remaining Native Americans).

The county was greatly expanded in 1792 to include what is today the lower peninsula of Michigan. Since 1796, other counties were created from Hamilton, reducing the county to its present size. The county was the location of much of the Northwest Indian War before and after its organization.

The United States forcibly removed most of the Shawnee and other Indian peoples to move to locations west of the Mississippi River in the 1820s.

Rapid growth occurred during the 1830s and 1840s as the area attracted many German and Irish immigrants, especially after the Great Famine in Ireland and the revolutions in Germany in 1848.

During the Civil War, Morgan's Raid (a Confederate cavalry campaign from Kentucky) passed through the northern part of the county during the summer of 1863.

The Sharonville Engineer Depot was constructed by the United States Army in northern Hamilton County in 1942, and continued to be used by the General Services Administration and then the Defense Logistics Agency after 1949. It is currently mostly redeveloped for industrial purposes.

== Geography ==
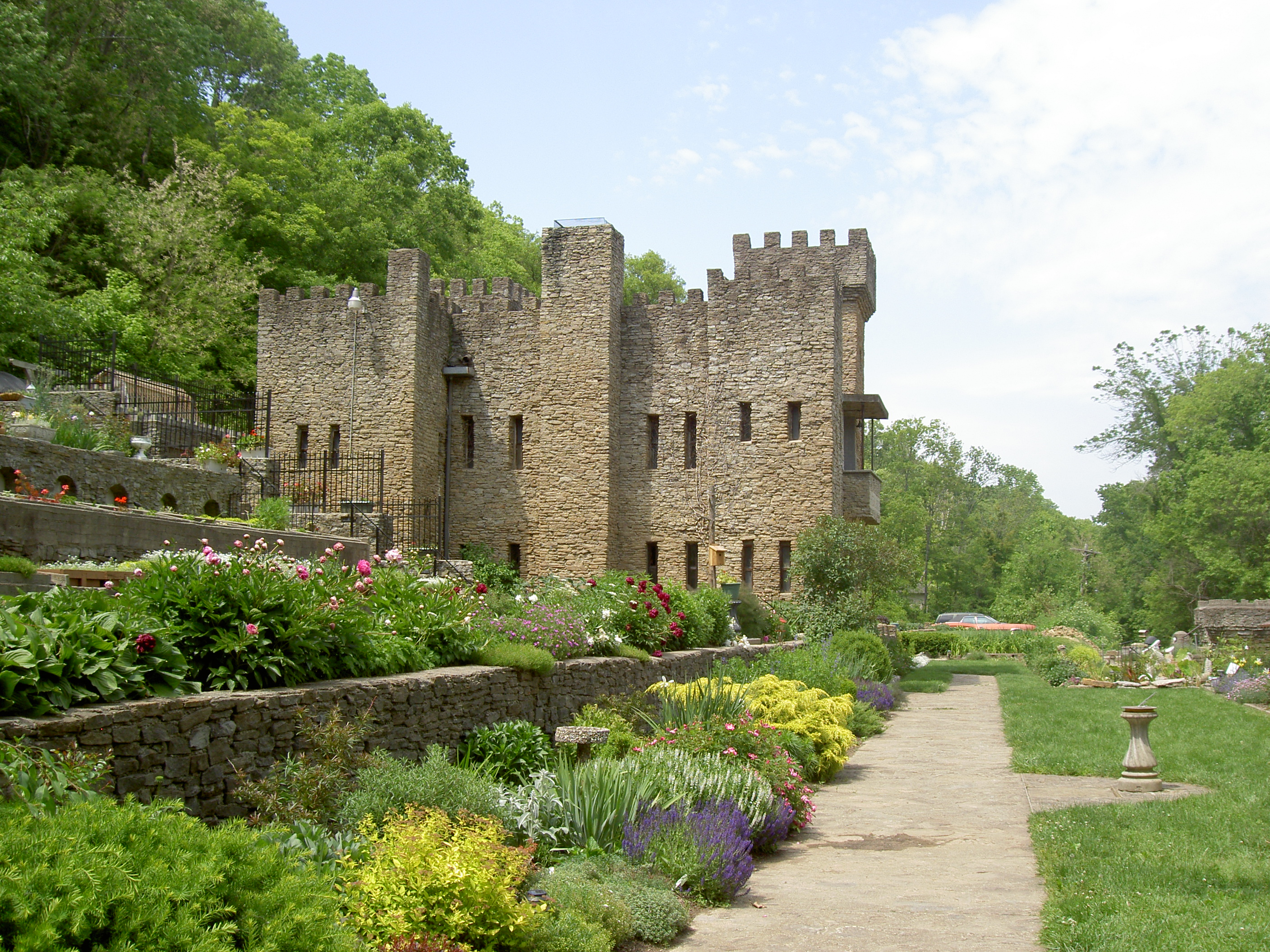
Château Laroche in Symmes Township lies in the Little Miami Valley.

According to the U.S. Census Bureau, the county has a total area of 413 square miles (1,070 km^{2}), of which 406 square miles (1,050 km^{2}) is land and 6.7 square miles (17 km^{2}) (1.6%) is water.

=== Adjacent counties ===
- Franklin County, Indiana (northwest)
- Dearborn County, Indiana (west)
- Butler County (north)
- Warren County (northeast)
- Clermont County (east)
- Campbell County, Kentucky (southeast)
- Kenton County, Kentucky (south)
- Boone County, Kentucky (southwest)

=== Geographic features ===
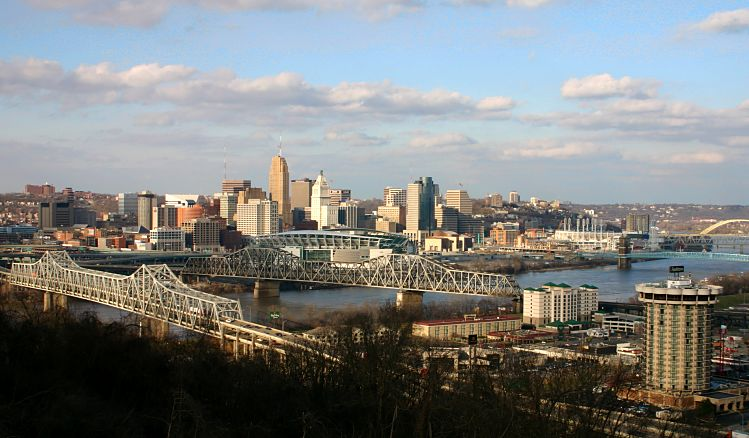
Cincinnati, Ohio viewed from the SW, across the Ohio River, in Kentucky

The county lies in a region of gentle hills formed by the slopes of the Ohio River valley and its tributaries. The Great Miami River, the Little Miami River, and the Mill Creek also contribute to this system of hillsides and valleys. No naturally occurring lakes exist, but three major humanmade lakes are part of the Great Parks of Hamilton County. The largest lake by far is Winton Woods Lake, covering 188 surface acres, followed by Miami Whitewater Lake, covering 85 surface acres, and Sharon Lake, covering 36 surface acres.

The county boundaries include the lowest point in Ohio, in Miami Township, where the Ohio River flows out of Ohio and into Indiana. This is the upper pool elevation behind the Markland Dam, 455 feet (139 m) above sea level.

The highest land elevation in Hamilton County is the Rumpke Sanitary Landfill at 1,045 feet (319 m) above sea level in Colerain Township.

== Demographics ==
Historical population
Census	Pop.	Note	%±
1800	14,692		—
1810	15,258		3.9%
1820	31,764		108.2%
1830	52,317		64.7%
1840	80,145		53.2%
1850	156,844		95.7%
1860	216,410		38.0%
1870	260,370		20.3%
1880	313,374		20.4%
1890	374,573		19.5%
1900	409,479		9.3%
1910	460,732		12.5%
1920	493,678		7.2%
1930	589,356		19.4%
1940	621,987		5.5%
1950	723,952		16.4%
1960	864,121		19.4%
1970	924,018		6.9%
1980	873,224		−5.5%
1990	866,218		−0.8%
2000	845,303		−2.4%
2010	802,374		−5.1%
2020	830,639		3.5%
2025 (est.)	838,418	▲	0.9%

=== 2020 census ===
As of the 2020 census, the county had 830,639 residents, which yielded a population density of 2,045.91 people per square mile (791.08/km^{2}). The median age was 36.9 years, with 22.3% of residents under the age of 18 and 16.2% aged 65 or older; for every 100 females there were 93.6 males, and for every 100 females age 18 and over there were 90.9 males.

There were 347,126 households in the county, of which 27.4% had children under the age of 18 living in them. Of all households, 37.9% were married-couple households, 21.7% were households with a male householder and no spouse or partner present, and 33.3% were households with a female householder and no spouse or partner present. About 34.6% of all households were made up of individuals and 11.8% had someone living alone who was 65 years of age or older. The county had 379,015 housing units, 8.4% of which were vacant; of the occupied units, 57.4% were owner-occupied and 42.6% were renter-occupied, and the homeowner and rental vacancy rates were 1.4% and 8.6%, respectively.

The racial makeup of the county was 63.3% White, 25.2% Black or African American, 0.3% American Indian and Alaska Native, 3.0% Asian, 0.1% Native Hawaiian and Pacific Islander, 2.4% from some other race, and 5.7% from two or more races; Hispanic or Latino residents of any race comprised 4.4% of the population.

97.6% of residents lived in urban areas, while 2.4% lived in rural areas.

=== Racial and ethnic composition ===
Hamilton County, Ohio – racial and ethnic composition Note: the US Census treats Hispanic/Latino as an ethnic category. This table excludes Latinos from the racial categories and assigns them to a separate category. Hispanics/Latinos may be of any race.
Race / ethnicity (NH = Non-Hispanic)	Pop 1980	Pop 1990	Pop 2000	Pop 2010	Pop 2020	% 1980	% 1990	% 2000	% 2010	% 2020
White alone (NH)	695,958	669,704	611,767	542,273	519,734	79.70%	77.31%	72.37%	67.58%	62.57%
Black or African American alone (NH)	164,744	180,531	197,192	204,748	207,764	18.87%	20.84%	23.33%	25.52%	25.01%
Native American or Alaska Native alone (NH)	763	1,125	1,330	1,219	1,173	0.09%	0.13%	0.16%	0.15%	0.14%
Asian alone (NH)	4,846	8,965	13,530	16,080	25,160	0.55%	1.03%	1.60%	2.00%	3.03%
Native Hawaiian or Pacific Islander alone (NH)	x	x	207	474	618	x	x	0.02%	0.06%	0.07%
Other race alone (NH)	1,397	705	1,616	1,665	3,959	0.16%	0.08%	0.19%	0.21%	0.48%
Mixed-race or multiracial (NH)	x	x	10,147	15,308	35,981	x	x	1.20%	1.91%	4.33%
Hispanic or Latino (any race)	5,516	5,198	9,514	20,607	36,250	0.63%	0.60%	1.13%	2.57%	4.36%
Total	873,224	866,228	845,303	802,374	830,639	100.00%	100.00%	100.00%	100.00%	100.00%

=== 2016–2020 American Community Survey ===
According to the U.S. Census American Community Survey, for the period 2016-2020 the estimated median annual income for a household in the county was $66,878, and the median income for a family was $92,480. About 15.3% of the population were living below the poverty line, including 17.6% of those under age 18 and 10.8% of those age 65 or over. About 64.1% of the population were employed, and 41.8% had a bachelor's degree or higher.

=== 2010 census ===
As of the 2010 census, there were 802,374 people, 333,945 households, and 197,571 families living in the county. The population density was 1,976.7 inhabitants per square mile (763.2/km^{2}). There were 377,364 housing units at an average density of 929.7 per square mile (359.0/km^{2}). The racial makeup of the county was 68.8% white, 25.7% black or African American, 2.0% Asian, 0.2% American Indian, 0.1% Pacific islander, 1.1% from other races, and 2.1% from two or more races. Those of Hispanic or Latino origin made up 2.6% of the population. In terms of ancestry, 31.0% were German, 14.7% were Irish, 7.7% were English, and 6.6% were American.

Of the 333,945 households, 29.7% had children under the age of 18 living with them, 39.4% were married couples living together, 15.4% had a female householder with no husband present, 40.8% were non-families, and 33.9% of all households were made up of individuals. The average household size was 2.34 and the average family size was 3.04. The median age was 37.1 years.

The median income for a household in the county was $48,234 and the median income for a family was $64,683. Males had a median income of $48,344 versus $37,310 for females. The per capita income for the county was $28,799. About 11.1% of families and 15.4% of the population were below the poverty line, including 22.9% of those under age 18 and 9.0% of those age 65 or over.

=== 2000 census ===
As of the 2000 census, there were 845,303 people, 346,790 households, and 212,582 families living in the county. The population density was 2,075 inhabitants per square mile (801/km^{2}). There were 373,393 housing units at an average density of 917 per square mile (354/km^{2}). The racial makeup of the county was 69.2% White, 26.0% Black or African American, 0.1% Native American, 2.3% Asian, 0.01% Pacific Islander, 0.51% from other races, and 2.2% from two or more races. 2.8% of the population were Hispanic or Latino of any race.

There were 346,790 households, out of which 30.20% had children under the age of 18 living with them, 43.40% were married couples living together, 14.30% had a female householder with no husband present, and 38.70% were non-families. 32.90% of all households were made up of individuals, and 10.60% had someone living alone who was 65 years of age or older. The average household size was 2.38 and the average family size was 3.07.

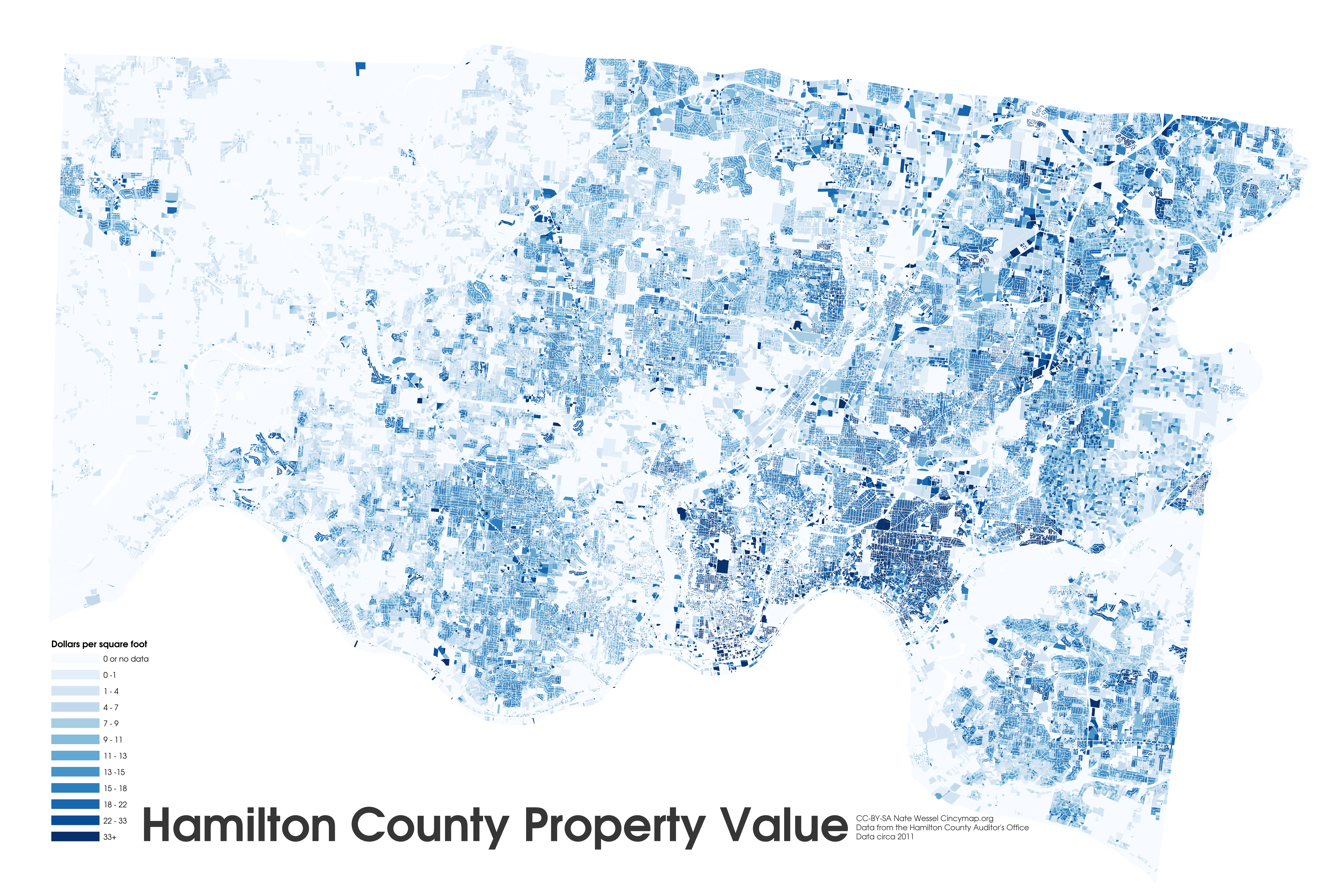
Hamilton County property value, dollars per square foot in 2011

In the county, the population was spread out, with 25.80% under the age of 18, 9.60% from 18 to 24, 29.70% from 25 to 44, 21.50% from 45 to 64, and 13.50% who were 65 years of age or older. The median age was 36 years. For every 100 females there were 91.10 males. For every 100 females age 18 and over, there were 86.80 males.

The median income for a household in the county was $40,964, and the median income for a family was $53,449. Males had a median income of $39,842 versus $28,550 for females. The per capita income for the county was $24,053. About 8.80% of families and 11.80% of the population were below the poverty line, including 16.20% of those under age 18 and 8.70% of those age 65 or over.

=== Population ===
The county's highest population was recorded in the 1970 U.S. Census. Since then, the county has lost population at an average rate of three percent per decade. Although Hamilton County is experiencing a decline in birth rates and has higher death rates in older age groups (cohorts), out-migration of residents is the key factor in population loss. In the last decade, this population loss has been reversed, and it is estimated that both Hamilton County and the City of Cincinnati have grown their populations. The Cincinnati Metropolitan Statistical Area, over the last three decades has seen a 19 percent increase in population. Much of the region's growth has been through movement of Cincinnati and Hamilton County residents into neighboring counties.

== Government ==
As of 2020, the members of the Hamilton Board of County Commissioners are Denise Driehaus, Stephanie Summerow Dumas, and Alicia Reece.

Since 1963, the Board has employed an administrator to run the day-to-day operations of the county; the current administrator is Jeffrey Aluotto. Other elected officers include Dusty Rhodes (Auditor), Connie Pillich (Prosecutor), Charmaine McGuffey (Sheriff), Eric Beck (Engineer), Scott Crowley (Recorder), Jill Schiller (Treasurer), and Lakshmi Sammarco (Coroner).

As of 2021, the elected Common Pleas Court include Judge Jody Luebbers, Judge Lisa Allen, Judge Jennifer Branch, Judge Wende Cross, Judge Leslie Ghiz, Judge Robert Goering, Judge Tom Heekin, Judge Christian Jenkins, Judge Charles Kubicki, Judge Melba Marsh, Judge Terry Nestor, Judge Robert Ruehlman, Judge Nicole Sanders, Judge Megan Shanahan, Judge Alan Triggs, and Judge Christopher Wagner.

=== Politics ===
Hamilton County was historically rather conservative for an urban county. It long favored Republican candidates in national elections, but has trended Democratic in recent years. In 2008, Barack Obama was the first Democratic presidential candidate to win the county since 1964, and only the second since 1936. The county continued to lean Democratic, voting for Obama again in 2012 and for Democratic candidate Hillary Clinton in 2016. It was one of the few counties in Ohio to swing toward the Democrats in 2016 even as the state as a whole swung toward the Republicans.

In other state elections, the county also tended to favor Republican candidates. Richard Cordray in his failed 2018 bid was the first Democrat to win the county in a gubernatorial election since Dick Celeste in 1982, and only the second since Michael DiSalle in 1958. In Senate elections, the county also tended to back Republicans, but has been won by Frank Lausche in 1962, John Glenn in all four of his elections and Howard Metzenbaum and Sherrod Brown in two out of three elections for both (1982 and 1988, and 2012 and 2018). In the 2006 Ohio elections, both Ted Strickland and Sherrod Brown lost the county by less than 2,000 votes while winning statewide by 24 and 12 points, respectively.

With the election of Democrat Stephanie Summerow Dumas in 2018 midterm elections, the Hamilton County Board of Commissioners was entirely Democratic for the first time ever. Democrats had previously regained majority control of the Board of Commissioners in 2016 with the election of Denise Driehaus. In 2019, longtime Democratic Commissioner Todd Portune announced his resignation from the Board due to health problems. Portune's chief of staff, Victoria Parks, was appointed to serve the remainder of his term (through the November 2020 general election). With Parks' appointment, the Board of Commissioners became for the first time all-female and majority Black. In the November 2020 election, Democrat Alicia Reece was elected to fill Parks' seat, thereby retaining the Board's status as all-female and majority Black.

Historically, due to its tight races and its position in the swing state of Ohio, Hamilton County was regarded as a crucial county to win in presidential elections. In 2012, The Washington Post named Hamilton as one of the seven most important counties in the country for that year's election. Time characterized Hamilton County's political scene as "a battle between conservative suburbs and a Democratic urban center, though Cincinnati is one of the most conservative metro areas in the Midwest." Those characterizations became less true in recent years. While many of Cincinnati's western suburbs, like Green and Delhi Townships, continue to strongly support Republican candidates, the city itself and most of its northern suburbs vote strongly Democratic.

United States presidential election results for Hamilton County, Ohio
Year	Republican		Democratic		Third party(ies)	
Year	No.	%	No.	%	No.	%
1856	9,345	33.28%	13,051	46.48%	5,685	20.25%
1860	16,182	45.37%	15,431	43.27%	4,051	11.36%
1864	22,833	57.89%	16,606	42.11%	0	0.00%
1868	24,167	56.29%	18,768	43.71%	0	0.00%
1872	20,083	44.60%	24,941	55.39%	1	0.00%
1876	28,869	49.46%	29,451	50.46%	43	0.07%
1880	35,173	53.76%	30,122	46.04%	133	0.20%
1884	38,744	53.45%	33,248	45.87%	494	0.68%
1888	41,507	51.50%	37,661	46.73%	1,423	1.77%
1892	41,963	51.15%	38,392	46.80%	1,685	2.05%
1896	57,749	59.86%	38,165	39.56%	561	0.58%
1900	55,466	56.88%	40,228	41.25%	1,821	1.87%
1904	65,129	66.43%	24,936	25.44%	7,973	8.13%
1908	63,803	56.49%	45,429	40.22%	3,714	3.29%
1912	42,119	38.31%	42,909	39.03%	24,921	22.67%
1916	64,030	53.33%	51,990	43.30%	4,049	3.37%
1920	112,590	57.16%	77,598	39.40%	6,778	3.44%
1924	115,950	60.70%	34,916	18.28%	40,163	21.02%
1928	147,534	57.03%	110,151	42.58%	1,007	0.39%
1932	118,804	47.70%	123,109	49.43%	7,163	2.88%
1936	108,506	38.69%	153,117	54.60%	18,813	6.71%
1940	154,733	50.96%	148,907	49.04%	0	0.00%
1944	154,960	51.75%	144,470	48.25%	0	0.00%
1948	151,055	52.37%	135,290	46.91%	2,068	0.72%
1952	207,690	59.60%	140,785	40.40%	0	0.00%
1956	222,009	66.11%	113,797	33.89%	0	0.00%
1960	211,068	54.50%	176,215	45.50%	0	0.00%
1964	161,179	44.73%	199,127	55.27%	0	0.00%
1968	183,611	50.24%	135,057	36.95%	46,815	12.81%
1972	239,212	65.65%	119,054	32.67%	6,119	1.68%
1976	211,267	59.84%	135,605	38.41%	6,207	1.76%
1980	206,979	57.73%	129,114	36.01%	22,448	6.26%
1984	246,288	63.34%	140,350	36.10%	2,177	0.56%
1988	227,004	61.29%	140,354	37.89%	3,026	0.82%
1992	192,447	47.70%	148,409	36.79%	62,564	15.51%
1996	186,493	50.12%	160,458	43.13%	25,117	6.75%
2000	204,175	54.03%	161,578	42.76%	12,146	3.21%
2004	222,616	52.50%	199,679	47.09%	1,730	0.41%
2008	195,530	46.00%	225,213	52.98%	4,343	1.02%
2012	193,326	46.15%	219,927	52.50%	5,641	1.35%
2016	173,665	42.45%	215,719	52.73%	19,725	4.82%
2020	177,886	41.28%	246,266	57.15%	6,777	1.57%
2024	172,365	41.71%	233,360	56.47%	7,488	1.81%

United States Senate election results for Hamilton County, Ohio1
Year	Republican		Democratic		Third party(ies)	
Year	No.	%	No.	%	No.	%
2024	158,523	38.88%	235,825	57.84%	13,394	3.28%

=== Hamilton County officials ===
Office	Officeholder	Party
County commissioner	Stephanie Summerow Dumas	Democratic
County commissioner	Alicia Reece	Democratic
County commissioner	Denise Driehaus	Democratic
Auditor	Jessica Miranda	Democratic
Clerk of courts	Pavan Parikh	Democratic
Coroner	Lakshmi Kode Sammarco	Democratic
Engineer	Eric Beck	Republican
Prosecutor	Connie Pillich	Democratic
Recorder	Scott Crowley	Democratic
Sheriff	Charmaine McGuffey	Democratic
Treasurer	Jill Schiller	Democratic

=== Ohio House of Representatives ===
District	Representative	Party
24	Dani Isaacsohn	Democratic
25	Cecil Thomas	Democratic
26	Sedrick Denson	Democratic
27	Rachel Baker	Democratic
28	Karen Brownlee	Democratic
29	Cindy Abrams	Republican
30	Mike Odioso	Republican

=== Ohio State Senate ===
District	Senator	Party
7	Steve Wilson	Republican
8	Louis Blessing	Republican
9	Catherine Ingram	Democratic

=== United States House of Representatives ===
District	Representative	Party
1	Greg Landsman	Democratic
8	Warren Davidson	Republican

=== United States Senate ===
Senator	Party
Bernie Moreno	Republican
Jon Husted	Republican

== Education ==
=== K-12 education ===
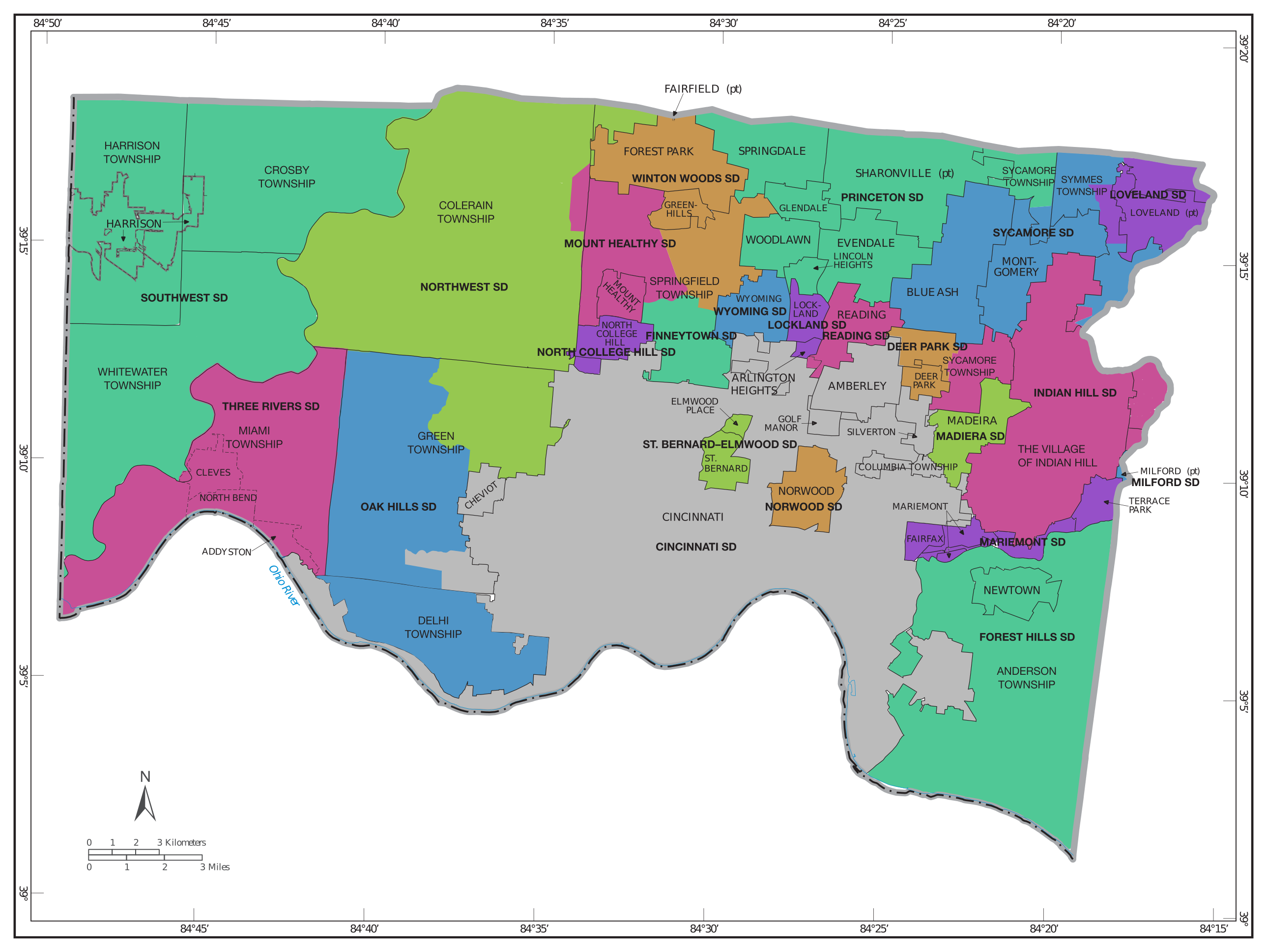
School districts in Hamilton County

Public elementary and secondary education is provided by 23 school districts:

- Cincinnati Public Schools
- Deer Park Community City
- Finneytown Local
- Forest Hills Local
- Indian Hill Exempted Village
- Lockland Local
- Loveland City
- Madeira City
- Mariemont City
- Milford Exempted Village
- Mount Healthy City
- North College Hill City
- Northwest Local
- Norwood City
- Oak Hills Local
- Princeton City
- Reading City
- Southwest Local
- St. Bernard - Elmwood Place City
- Sycamore Community
- Three Rivers Local
- Winton Woods City
- Wyoming City

In 2016, Cincinnati Public Schools had 35,000 students, 63% of which were African-American. The county also has a vocational school district, the Great Oaks Career Campuses. Parochial schools of various denominations add to this base. Among these the Roman Catholic Archdiocese of Cincinnati maintains a system of 108 elementary and 22 secondary schools, the ninth largest private school system in the United States.

=== Colleges and universities ===
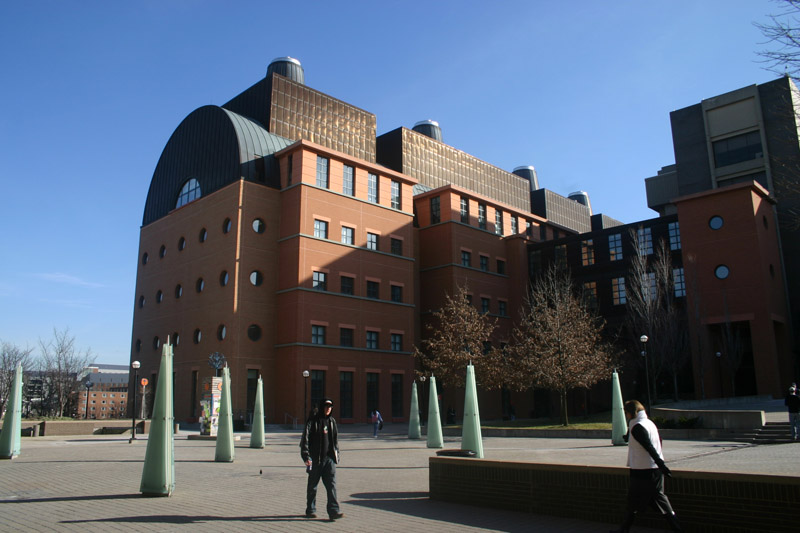
The University of Cincinnati was founded in 1819; the Engineering Research Center, designed by UC Alumnus Michael Graves, was designed to look like a 4-cylinder engine.

- Art Academy of Cincinnati
- Athenaeum of Ohio
- Mount St. Joseph University
- Chatfield College
- Cincinnati College of Mortuary Science
- Cincinnati State Technical and Community College
- God's Bible School and College
- Hebrew Union College
- Mount St. Mary's Seminary of the West
- Union Institute and University
- University of Cincinnati
- Xavier University

== Transportation ==
=== Major highways ===
- I-71
- I-74
- I-75
- I-275
- I-471
- US 22 / SR 3
- US 27
- US 42
- US 50
- US 52
- US 127
- SR 4
- SR 32
- SR 125
- SR 126
- SR 128
- SR 264
- SR 561
- SR 562
- SR 747

=== Public transportation ===
- Southwest Ohio Regional Transit Authority (SORTA, branded as Metro)
- The Connector streetcar

=== Railroads ===
Railroads include CSX Transportation, Norfolk Southern, RailAmerica, and Amtrak.

== Recreation ==
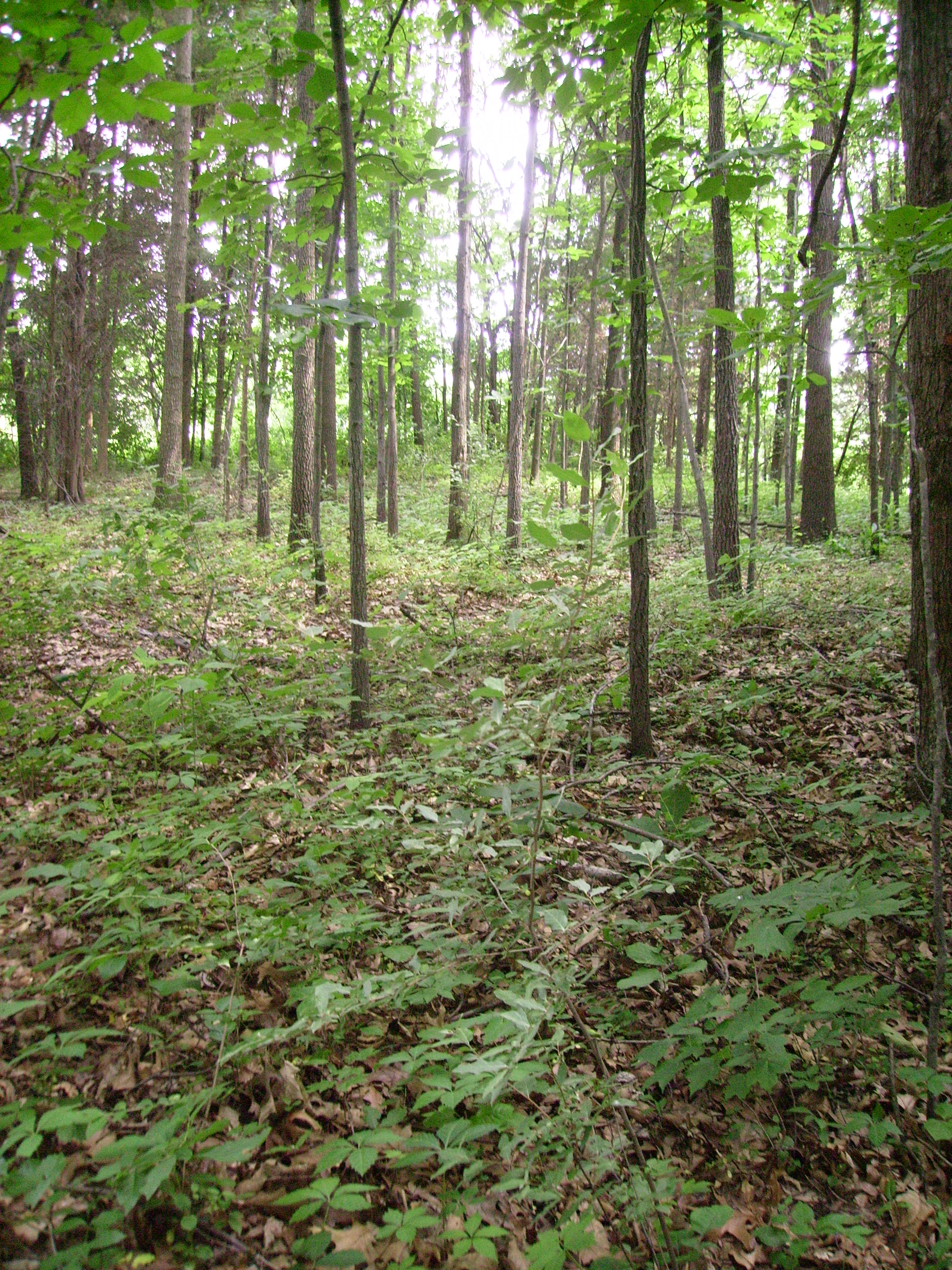
Miami Whitewater Forest was the second park to join the Great Parks of Hamilton County in 1949; it now spans 4,279 acres.

The county, in cooperation with the City of Cincinnati, operates the Public Library of Cincinnati and Hamilton County system with a main library and 41 branches.

Major sports teams are listed under the communities in which they are located, primarily Cincinnati.

The Great Parks of Hamilton County district resides within Hamilton County, and maintains a series of preserves and educational facilities. Three of the largest parks in the system are Miami Whitewater Forest, Winton Woods, and Sharon Woods.

The Hamilton County Fair is the oldest county fair in Ohio.

== Communities ==
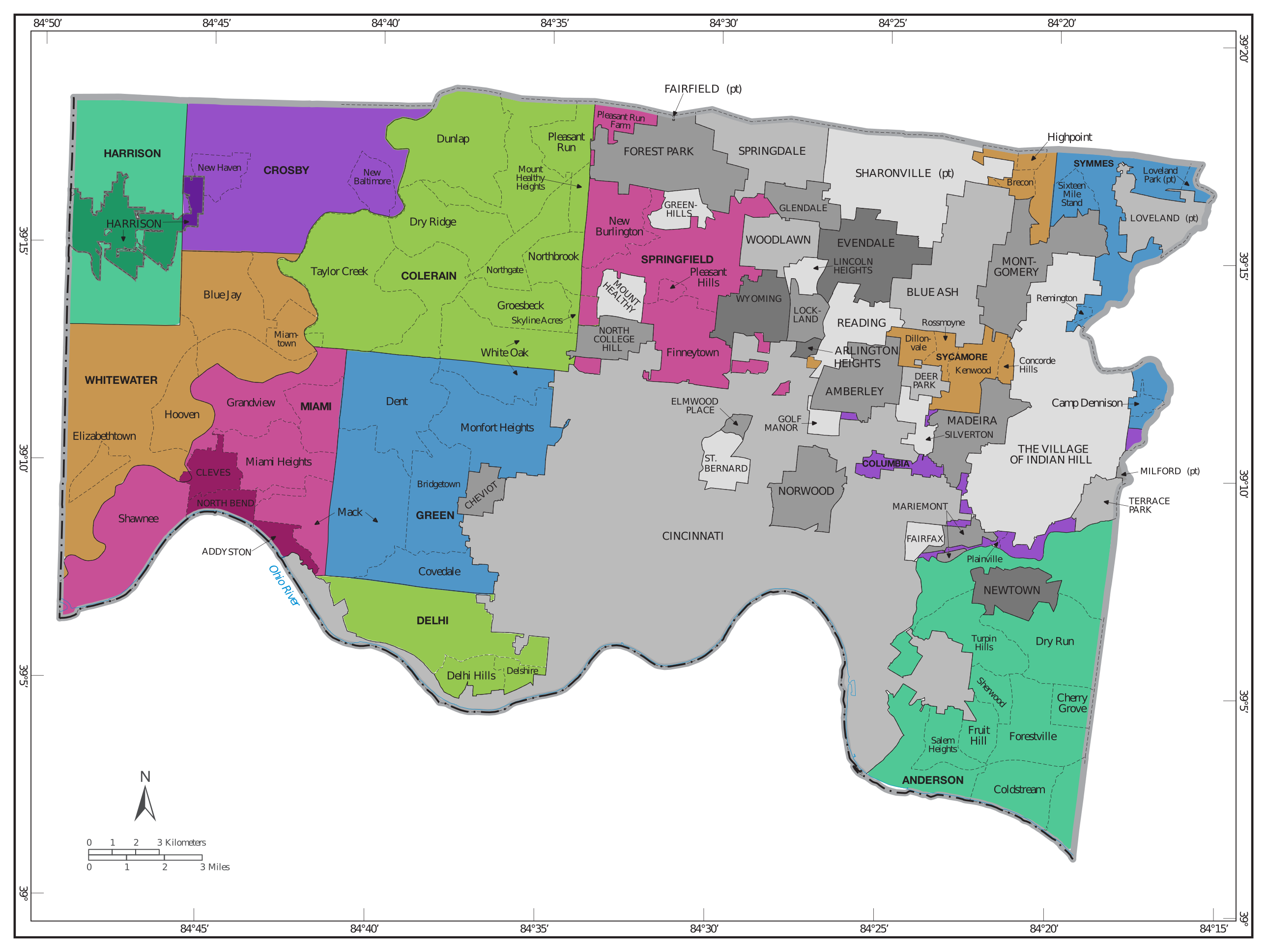
Map of Hamilton County, Ohio, with independent cities and villages in gray, and townships in colors

=== Cities ===
- Blue Ash
- Cheviot
- Cincinnati (county seat)
- Deer Park
- Fairfield (small part)
- Forest Park
- Harrison
- Village of Indian Hill
- Loveland (part)
- Madeira
- Milford (part)
- Montgomery
- Mount Healthy
- North College Hill
- Norwood
- Reading
- Sharonville (mostly)
- Springdale
- Wyoming

=== Villages ===
- Addyston
- Amberley
- Arlington Heights
- Cleves
- Elmwood Place
- Evendale
- Fairfax
- Glendale
- Golf Manor
- Greenhills
- Lincoln Heights
- Lockland
- Mariemont
- Newtown
- North Bend
- Silverton
- St. Bernard
- Terrace Park
- Woodlawn

=== Townships ===
The following list includes townships that have existed within present-day Hamilton County, including those that no longer exist or remain only as paper townships. It does not include townships that became part of Butler, Warren, Clermont, Montgomery, and other counties.

- Anderson
- Cincinnati (defunct)
- Colerain
- Columbia
- Crosby
- Delhi
- Fulton (defunct)
- Green
- Harrison
- Miami
- Mill Creek (defunct)
- South Bend Township (defunct)
- Springfield
- Spencer (defunct)
- Storrs (defunct)
- Sycamore
- Symmes
- Whitewater

=== Census-designated places ===
- Blue Jay
- Brecon
- Bridgetown
- Camp Dennison
- Cherry Grove
- Coldstream
- Concorde Hills
- Covedale
- Delhi Hills
- Delshire
- Dent
- Dillonvale
- Dry Ridge
- Dry Run
- Dunlap
- Elizabethtown
- Finneytown
- Forestville
- Fruit Hill
- Grandview
- Groesbeck
- Highpoint
- Hooven
- Kenwood
- Loveland Park (part)
- Mack
- Madison Place
- Miami Heights
- Miamitown
- Monfort Heights
- Mount Healthy Heights
- New Baltimore
- New Burlington
- New Haven
- Northbrook
- Northgate
- Plainville
- Pleasant Hills
- Pleasant Run
- Pleasant Run Farm
- Remington
- Ridgewood
- Rossmoyne
- Salem Heights
- Shawnee
- Sherwood
- Sixteen Mile Stand
- Skyline Acres
- Taylor Creek
- Turpin Hills
- White Oak

=== Unincorporated communities ===
- Colerain Heights
- Mount Saint Joseph

=== Neighborhoods of Cincinnati ===
- Avondale
- Bond Hill
- California
- Camp Washington
- Carthage
- Clifton
- College Hill
- Columbia-Tusculum
- Corryville
- CUF
- Downtown
- East End
- East Price Hill
- East Walnut Hills
- East Westwood
- English Woods
- Evanston
- Hartwell
- The Heights
- Hyde Park
- Kennedy Heights
- Linwood
- Lower Price Hill
- Madisonville
- Millvale
- Mount Adams
- Mount Airy
- Mount Auburn
- Mount Lookout
- Mount Washington
- North Avondale
- North Fairmount
- Northside
- O'Bryonville
- Oakley
- Over-the-Rhine
- Paddock Hills
- Pendleton
- Pleasant Ridge
- Queensgate
- Riverside
- Roselawn
- Sayler Park
- Sedamsville
- South Cumminsville
- South Fairmount
- Spring Grove Village
- Walnut Hills
- West End
- West Price Hill
- Westwood
- Winton Hills

== See also ==
- National Register of Historic Places listings in Hamilton County, Ohio
