= Northbrook, Ohio =

- Census-designated place
- Location in Hamilton County and the state of Ohio
- Coordinates: 39°14′55″N 84°34′43″W
- Country: United States
- State: Ohio
- County: Hamilton

Area
  - Total: 1.93 sq mi (5.00 km^{2})
  - Land: 1.93 sq mi (5.00 km^{2})
  - Water: 0 sq mi (0.00 km^{2})
- Elevation: 817 ft (249 m)

Population (2020)
  - Total: 10,912
  - Density: 5,652.3/sq mi (2,182.38/km^{2})
- Time zone: UTC-5 (Eastern (EST))
  - Summer (DST): UTC-4 (EDT)
- FIPS code: 39-56280
- GNIS feature ID: 2393157

Northbrook is a census-designated place (CDP) in Colerain Township, Hamilton County, Ohio, United States. The population was 10,912 at the 2020 census.

== Geography ==
According to the United States Census Bureau, the CDP has a total area of 1.9 square miles (4.9 km^{2}), all land.

== Demographics ==
Historical population
Census	Pop.	Note	%±
2020	10,912		—
U.S. Decennial Census

=== 2020 census ===
As of the 2020 census, Northbrook had a population of 10,912 and a population density of 5,650.96 people per square mile (2,182.38/km^{2}). The median age was 34.9 years. 26.8% of residents were under the age of 18 and 13.6% were 65 years of age or older. For every 100 females, there were 87.8 males, and for every 100 females age 18 and over, there were 82.0 males age 18 and over.

100.0% of residents lived in urban areas, while 0.0% lived in rural areas.

There were 4,176 households in Northbrook, of which 33.6% had children under the age of 18 living in them. Of all households, 33.1% were married-couple households, 18.6% were households with a male householder and no spouse or partner present, and 39.3% were households with a female householder and no spouse or partner present. About 28.7% of all households were made up of individuals, and 11.3% had someone living alone who was 65 years of age or older. The average household size was 2.71, and the average family size was 3.21.

There were 4,407 housing units, of which 5.2% were vacant. The homeowner vacancy rate was 1.3%, and the rental vacancy rate was 6.5%.

Racial composition as of the 2020 census
Race	Number	Percent
White	5,340	48.9%
Black or African American	4,011	36.8%
American Indian and Alaska Native	48	0.4%
Asian	234	2.1%
Native Hawaiian and Other Pacific Islander	13	0.1%
Some other race	381	3.5%
Two or more races	885	8.1%
Hispanic or Latino (of any race)	622	5.7%

=== Income and poverty ===
According to the U.S. Census American Community Survey, for the period 2016-2020 the estimated median annual income for a household in the CDP was $55,543, and the median income for a family was $61,192. About 16.7% of the population were living below the poverty line, including 26.9% of those under age 18 and 8.2% of those age 65 or over. About 64.0% of the population were employed, and 19.8% had a bachelor's degree or higher.

=== 2000 census ===
At the 2000 census there were 11,076 people, 4,179 households, and 2,996 families living in the CDP. The population density was 5,713.1 inhabitants per square mile (2,205.8/km^{2}). There were 4,290 housing units at an average density of 2,212.8 per square mile (854.4/km^{2}). The racial makeup of the CDP was 82.15% White, 14.16% African American, 0.35% Native American, 0.97% Asian, 0.09% Pacific Islander, 0.57% from other races, and 1.72% from two or more races. Hispanic or Latino of any race were 1.56%.

Of the 4,179 households 34.7% had children under the age of 18 living with them, 51.0% were married couples living together, 15.7% had a female householder with no husband present, and 28.3% were non-families. 23.8% of households were one person and 9.0% were one person aged 65 or older. The average household size was 2.65 and the average family size was 3.13.

The age distribution was 28.7% under the age of 18, 8.0% from 18 to 24, 30.6% from 25 to 44, 21.0% from 45 to 64, and 11.7% 65 or older. The median age was 34 years. For every 100 females, there were 89.8 males. For every 100 females age 18 and over, there were 86.4 males.

The median household income was $44,573 and the median family income was $49,521. Males had a median income of $34,973 versus $24,781 for females. The per capita income for the CDP was $18,794. About 5.1% of families and 7.0% of the population were below the poverty line, including 10.3% of those under age 18 and 4.9% of those age 65 or over.
