= White Oak, Ohio =

- Census-designated place
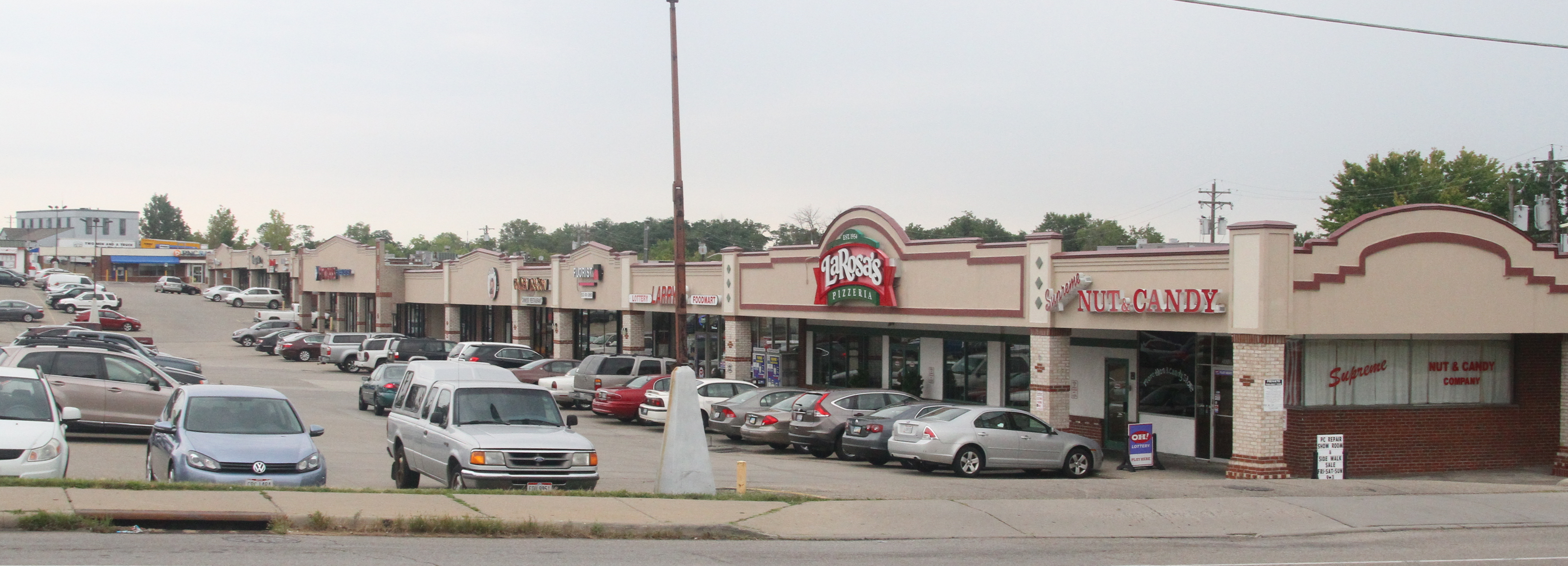
- White Oak Commercial Area

- Location in Hamilton County and the state of Ohio
- Coordinates: 39°12′50″N 84°36′49″W
- Country: United States
- State: Ohio
- County: Hamilton

Area
  - Total: 6.21 sq mi (16.09 km^{2})
  - Land: 6.21 sq mi (16.09 km^{2})
  - Water: 0 sq mi (0.00 km^{2})
- Elevation: 860 ft (260 m)

Population (2020)
  - Total: 19,541
  - Density: 3,145.6/sq mi (1,214.54/km^{2})
- Time zone: UTC-5 (Eastern (EST))
  - Summer (DST): UTC-4 (EDT)
- ZIP codes: 45239, 45247
- Area code: 513
- FIPS code: 39-84812
- GNIS feature ID: 2393852

White Oak is a census-designated place (CDP) in Hamilton County, Ohio, United States. It is seven miles northwest of Cincinnati. The population was 19,541 at the 2020 census. White Oak is situated in both Green Township and Colerain Township.

== History ==
White Oak was originally known as Saint Jacobs in the 19th century.

== Geography ==
According to the United States Census Bureau, the CDP has a total area of 6.2 square miles (16.0 km^{2}), all land.

== Demographics ==
Historical population
Census	Pop.	Note	%±
2020	19,541		—
U.S. Decennial Census

=== 2020 census ===
As of the 2020 census, White Oak had a population of 19,541, for a population density of 3,145.69 people per square mile (1,214.54/km^{2}). The median age was 40.6 years; 21.7% of residents were under the age of 18 and 18.3% were 65 years of age or older. For every 100 females there were 93.6 males, and for every 100 females age 18 and over there were 90.4 males age 18 and over.

100.0% of residents lived in urban areas, while 0.0% lived in rural areas.

There were 8,109 households in White Oak, of which 28.2% had children under the age of 18 living in them. Of all households, 45.4% were married-couple households, 18.5% were households with a male householder and no spouse or partner present, and 29.6% were households with a female householder and no spouse or partner present. About 30.8% of all households were made up of individuals and 13.1% had someone living alone who was 65 years of age or older.

There were 8,481 housing units, of which 4.4% were vacant. The homeowner vacancy rate was 0.6% and the rental vacancy rate was 5.9%.

Racial composition as of the 2020 census
Race	Number	Percent
White	14,186	72.6%
Black or African American	3,018	15.4%
American Indian and Alaska Native	27	0.1%
Asian	1,093	5.6%
Native Hawaiian and Other Pacific Islander	2	0.0%
Some other race	247	1.3%
Two or more races	968	5.0%
Hispanic or Latino (of any race)	421	2.2%

=== 2016–2020 American Community Survey ===
According to the U.S. Census American Community Survey, for the period 2016-2020 the estimated median annual income for a household in the CDP was $64,411, and the median income for a family was $93,457. About 6.6% of the population were living below the poverty line, including 10.3% of those under age 18 and 3.0% of those age 65 or over. About 67.7% of the population were employed, and 30.4% had a bachelor's degree or higher.

=== 2000 census ===
As of the census of 2000, there were 13,277 people, 5,263 households, and 3,647 families living in the CDP. The population density was 3,242.7 inhabitants per square mile (1,252.0/km^{2}). There were 5,464 housing units at an average density of 1,334.5 per square mile (515.3/km^{2}). The racial makeup of the CDP was 93.88% White, 3.55% African American, 0.17% Native American, 1.09% Asian, 0.41% from other races, and 0.91% from two or more races. Hispanic or Latino of any race were 1.08% of the population.

There were 5,263 households, out of which 33.7% had children under the age of 18 living with them, 55.0% were married couples living together, 10.8% had a female householder with no husband present, and 30.7% were non-families. 26.4% of all households were made up of individuals, and 10.4% had someone living alone who was 65 years of age or older. The average household size was 2.52 and the average family size was 3.07.

In the CDP, the population was spread out, with 26.5% under the age of 18, 8.3% from 18 to 24, 29.2% from 25 to 44, 21.4% from 45 to 64, and 14.6% who were 65 years of age or older. The median age was 37 years. For every 100 females, there were 94.1 males. For every 100 females age 18 and over, there were 88.5 males.

The median income for a household in the CDP was $45,306, and the median income for a family was $55,736. Males had a median income of $41,728 versus $28,768 for females. The per capita income for the CDP was $23,687. About 3.9% of families and 5.1% of the population were below the poverty line, including 7.2% of those under age 18 and 6.0% of those age 65 or over.
