= Ridgewood, Ohio =

- Census-designated place
- Location within Ohio Location within the United States
- Coordinates: 39°11′24″N 84°26′04″W
- Country: United States
- State: Ohio
- County: Hamilton
- Township: Columbia

Area
  - Total: 0.081 sq mi (0.21 km^{2})
  - Land: 0.081 sq mi (0.21 km^{2})
  - Water: 0 sq mi (0.00 km^{2})
- Elevation: 742 ft (226 m)

Population (2020)
  - Total: 506
  - Density: 6,237.4/sq mi (2,408.26/km^{2})
- Time zone: UTC-5 (Eastern (EST))
  - Summer (DST): UTC-4 (EDT)
- ZIP Code: 45213 (Cincinnati)
- Area code: 513
- FIPS code: 39-67128
- GNIS feature ID: 2812822

Ridgewood is a census-designated place (CDP) in Hamilton County, Ohio, United States, adjacent to the city of Cincinnati. It was first listed as a CDP prior to the 2020 census. The population was 506 at the 2020 census.

== Geography ==
The CDP is in eastern Hamilton County, in Columbia Township. It is bordered to the south by the Pleasant Ridge neighborhood of Cincinnati, to the north and east by the village of Amberley, and to the west by the village of Golf Manor. Downtown Cincinnati is 8 miles (13 km) to the southwest.

== Demographics ==
Historical population
Census	Pop.	Note	%±
2020	506		—
U.S. Decennial Census

As of the census of 2020, there were 506 people living in the CDP, for a population density of 6,246.91 people per square mile (2,408.26/km^{2}). There were 210 housing units. The racial makeup of the CDP was 86.4% White, 2.2% Black or African American, 0.4% Native American, 2.4% Asian, 0.0% Pacific Islander, 2.2% from some other race, and 6.5% from two or more races. 4.3% of the population were Hispanic or Latino of any race.

There were 185 households, out of which 42.2% had children under the age of 18 living with them, 74.6% were married couples living together, 7.0% had a male householder with no spouse present, and 18.4% had a female householder with no spouse present. 21.6% of all households were made up of individuals, and 3.2% were someone living alone who was 65 years of age or older. The average household size was 2.61, and the average family size was 2.99.

26.8% of the CDP's population were under the age of 18, 55.4% were 18 to 64, and 17.8% were 65 years of age or older. The median age was 43.6. For every 100 females, there were 106.9 males.

According to the U.S. Census American Community Survey, for the period 2016-2020 the estimated median annual income for a household in the CDP was $131,250, and the median income for a family was $147,868. About 2.9% of the population were living below the poverty line, including 6.2% of those under age 18 and 0.0% of those age 65 or over. About 74.1% of the population were employed, and 89.5% had a bachelor's degree or higher.
