= James Baxter House =

- U.S. National Register of Historic Places
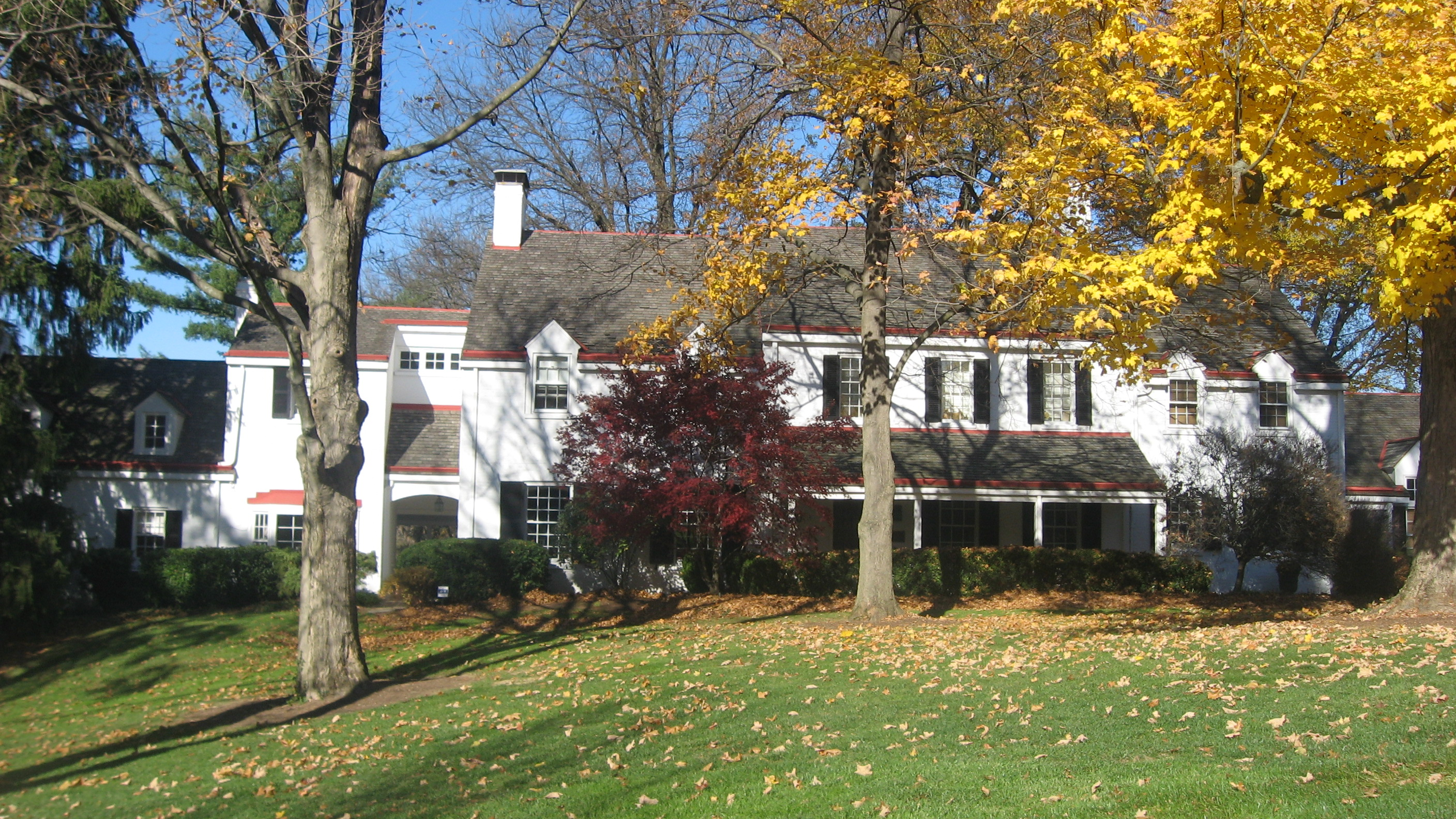
- Front of the house

- Location within Ohio Location within the United States
- Location: 2930 Fair Acres Dr., Amberley, Ohio
- Coordinates: 39°11′33″N 84°25′57″W
- Area: 2.6 acres (1.1 ha)
- Built: 1807
- Architect: Hubert H. Gott
- Architectural style: Colonial Revival, Federal
- NRHP reference No.: 94000774
- Added to NRHP: July 22, 1994

The James Baxter House is a historic residence in the village of Amberley, Ohio, United States, near Cincinnati. Built in the 1800s and expanded in the 1930s, it retains much of its original architecture, and it has been named a historic site.

The Baxter House is a brick structure with some weatherboarding and other wooden elements, set on a stone foundation and covered with a shake roof. A single-story porch shelters the center of the two-story facade, with the main entrance on the left side (as seen from the street) of the porch and two windows in the center and right side. Smaller extensions, two windows wide rather than three, are placed on either end of the center section of the house; all three sections rise to gables. The architecture is a mix of the Federal and Colonial Revival styles, which were the styles of the original building and of a 1930s addition, respectively.

James Baxter bought the future site of the present house in 1797 as part of a property approximately 0.5 square miles (1.3 km^{2}) in total area. Here he erected the core of the present house in 1807; many of the original elements, including the floor plan, the ash floor, the walnut cupboards, and much of the rest of the interior, have survived. Very little was modified until the 1930s, when the original building was expanded with a new section. The period owners derived much of the new addition's design from that of a Tidewater Virginia house, the colonial-era Carter's Grove. The resulting building is approximately 7,000 square feet (650 m^{2}) in area and surrounded by a large lawn with early landscaping and a caretaker's house.

In 1994, the Baxter House was listed on the National Register of Historic Places, qualifying because of its historically significant architecture. It is one of three Register-listed locations in Amberley, along with the Frank Lloyd Wright-designed Gerald B. and Beverley Tonkens House and the ancient Benham Mound built by the prehistoric Hopewell Indian people.
