= Mariemont City School District =

School district in Ohio

Coordinates: 39°9′N 84°22′W

Address
- 2 Warrior Way Cincinnati, Hamilton County, Ohio, 45227; United States

District information
- Type: Public
- Motto: Work smart. Create experience. Embrace growth.
- Grades: Pre-K through 12
- Superintendent: Steven Estepp
- Asst. superintendent(s): Brent Wise
- School board: 5 members
- Schools: 4
- NCES District ID: 3904431

Students and staff
- Students: 1,612 (2020–2021)
- Staff: 251
- Student–teacher ratio: 15.93

Other information
- Website: Official website

Mariemont City School District is an American public school district that serves families residing north of the Little Miami River in Hamilton County, Ohio.

Originally known as Plainville Rural School District, MCSD's client locales include the villages of Fairfax, Terrace Park, Mariemont, as well as two neighboring unincorporated areas of Columbia Township: Plainville and Williams' Meadow. It neighbors Cincinnati City School District in the west, Indian Hill Exempted Village School District in the north, Milford Exempted Village School District (Clermont County) in the east, and Forest Hills Local School District serves families occupying the banks opposite.

Early records acknowledge April 14, 1879 as its date of incorporation.

== Statistics ==
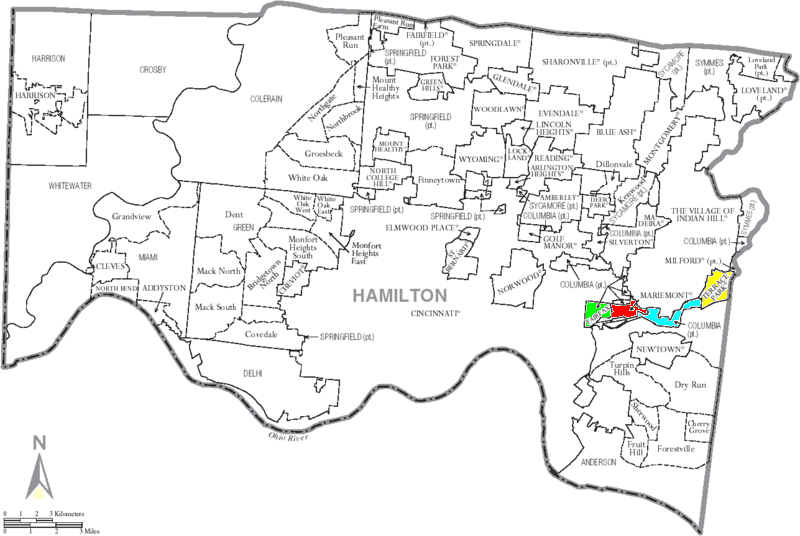
Mariemont City School District within Hamilton County includes Fairfax (green), Mariemont (red), a portion of Columbia Township (light blue) and Terrace Park (yellow).

The Mariemont City School District consists of four schools:

- Mariemont High School (Mariemont)
- Mariemont Jr. High School (Fairfax)
- Mariemont Elementary (Mariemont)
- Terrace Park Elementary (Terrace Park)

Total enrollment is approximately 1,700 students and Mariemont Elementary is the largest in the district by students served. At the time of the latest annual report, the district employed 188 certified and classified staff. Currently, there is at least one principal and one assistant principal (the latter of which is formally styled dean of students) exclusive to each campus. General administration consists of one superintendent, a treasurer, and a handful of directors for different district initiatives and programs.

For 2025, Mariemont City Schools was ranked by Niche as the #1 Public School District in Ohio and #1 in the nation for teacher quality.

== Academics ==
Mariemont City School District offers a traditional college-preparatory curriculum including both honors and AP courses at the secondary level as well as a robust gifted education program at the elementary level. Mariemont High School offers a total of 19 AP courses.

== Athletics ==
Mariemont City School District plays in the Cincinnati Hills League.

=== State Records ===
200 Yard Freestyle	1: 45.91	Cora Dupre, Cincinnati Mariemont	Canton	2019

=== State championships ===
Division II

- Boys Soccer 2021
- Swimming Cora Dupre 200 Yard Freestyle 2019, 2017
- Swimming Cora Dupre 100 Yard Freestyle 2019, 2018
- Swimming Cora Dupre Girls 50 Yard Freestyle 2018
- Girls Lacrosse, 2018 (Final 4 2019)
- Boys Lacrosse 2017 (2nd 2019, Final 4 2018)
