= Daniel Drake Park =

Park in Cincinnati, Ohio, United States

- Interactive map of Daniel Drake Park
- Type: Public
- Location: Cincinnati, Ohio
- Coordinates: 39°10′30″N 84°24′11″W
- Area: 66 acres
- Open: 6:00 a.m. to 10:00 p.m.

Daniel Drake Park is a Cincinnati park located on Red Bank Road opposite Onondago Avenue in the neighborhood of Kennedy Heights, named after Daniel Drake (a physician and early citizen of Cincinnati). The park is owned and operated by the Cincinnati Park Board. The land was purchased by the city in 1957 and expanded in 1959. The shelter was designed by the architects Arend and Arend.

Sledding is a popular winter pastime along the park's steep hillsides.
