= Plainville, Ohio =

- Census-designated place
- Location within Ohio
- Coordinates: 39°08′38″N 84°21′33″W
- Country: United States
- State: Ohio
- County: Hamilton
- Township: Columbia

Area
  - Total: 0.093 sq mi (0.24 km^{2})
  - Land: 0.093 sq mi (0.24 km^{2})
  - Water: 0 sq mi (0.00 km^{2})
- Elevation: 509 ft (155 m)

Population (2020)
  - Total: 120
  - Density: 1,316.3/sq mi (508.21/km^{2})
- Time zone: UTC-5 (Eastern (EST))
  - Summer (DST): UTC-4 (EDT)
- FIPS code: 39-63072
- GNIS feature ID: 2585519

Plainville is a census-designated place (CDP) in Columbia Township, Hamilton County, Ohio, United States. The population was 120 at the 2020 census.

== Geography ==
Plainville is located in a valley on the banks of the Little Miami River, opposite Newtown and adjacent to Mariemont and Indian Hill. Plainville is part of the Greater Cincinnati area and the Mariemont City School District. Many of the residences and structures are from the 19th century, and the old Plainville School which was built in 1910 and closed in 1957 still stands on Walton Creek Road and now serves as the home theater for the Mariemont Players theater troupe.

According to the United States Census Bureau, the CDP has a total area of 0.077 square miles (0.2 km^{2}), all land.

== Demographics ==
Historical population
Census	Pop.	Note	%±
2020	120		—
U.S. Decennial Census

As of the census of 2020, there were 120 people living in the CDP, for a population density of 1,318.68 people per square mile (508.21/km^{2}). There were 67 housing units. The racial makeup of the CDP was 95.8% White, 0.0% Black or African American, 0.0% Native American, 0.0% Asian, 0.0% Pacific Islander, 0.8% from some other race, and 3.3% from two or more races. 0.8% of the population were Hispanic or Latino of any race.

There were 68 households, out of which 0.0% had children under the age of 18 living with them, 0.0% were married couples living together, 0.0% had a male householder with no spouse present, and 100.0% had a female householder with no spouse present. 0.0% of all households were made up of individuals. The average household size was 2.24.

100.0% of the CDP's population were age 18 to 64. 55.3% were age 30 to 34 and 44.7% were 60 to 64.

According to the U.S. Census American Community Survey, about 0.0% of the population were living below the poverty line. About 55.3% of the population were employed, and 0.0% had a bachelor's degree or higher.
