= Pleasant Ridge, Cincinnati =

Pleasant Ridge
- Neighborhood of Cincinnati
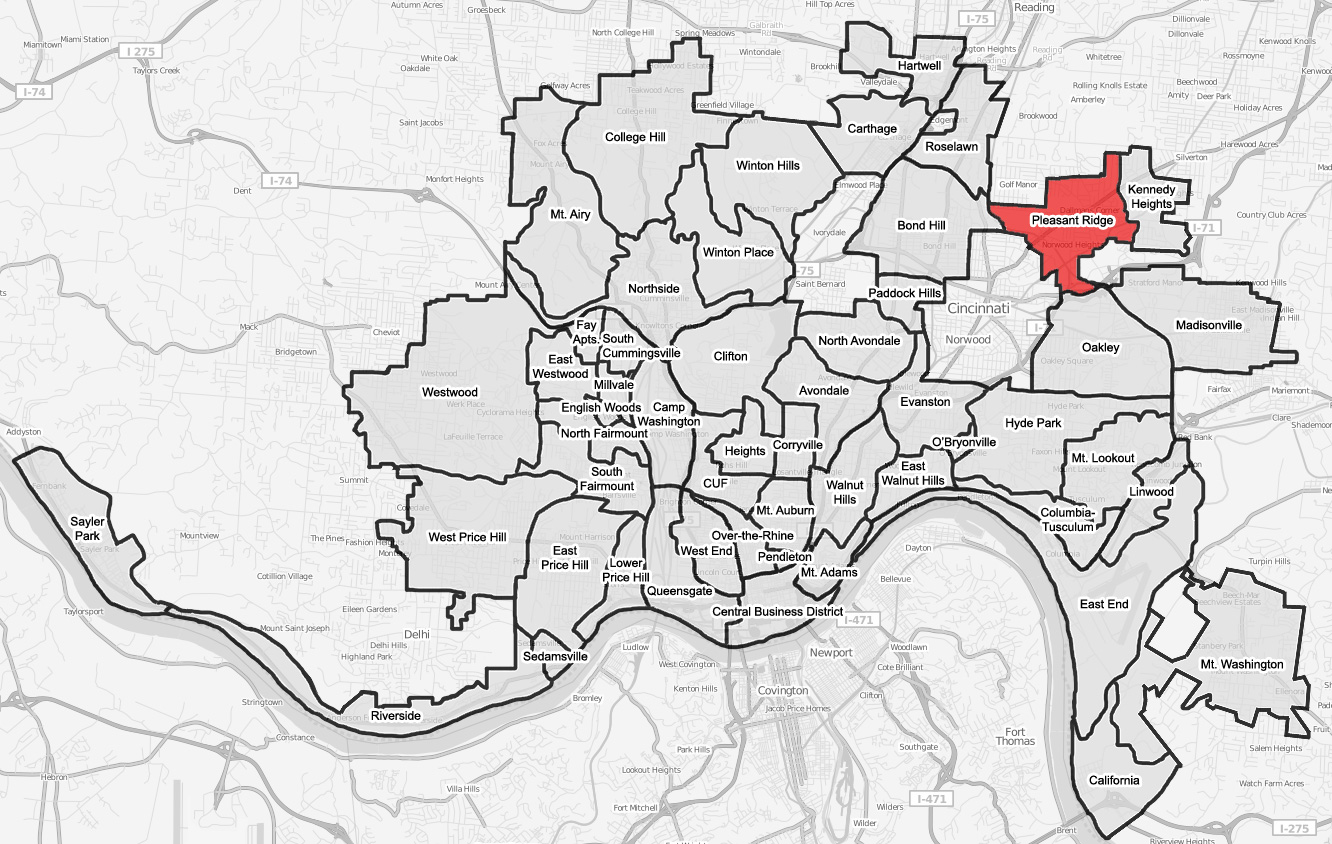
- Pleasant Ridge (red) within Cincinnati, Ohio
- Country: United States
- State: Ohio
- County: Hamilton
- City: Cincinnati

Population (2020)
  - Total: 8,895
- ZIP code: 45212, 45213, 45237

Pleasant Ridge is one of the 52 neighborhoods of Cincinnati, Ohio. Located in the northeastern portion of the city, it is centered on the intersection of Montgomery Road and Ridge Avenue. Pleasant Ridge was incorporated as a village in 1891 and annexed by Cincinnati in 1912. The population was 8,895 at the 2020 census.

== History ==
European-American activity in the area dates to 1795, when land agent John McFarland purchased approximately 1,000 acres (4.0 km^{2}) from John Cleves Symmes and established McFarland's Station. The fortified settlement was located near the present boundary between Pleasant Ridge and Kennedy Heights.

Permanent settlement developed during the early nineteenth century around two roads. Columbia Road, now Ridge Avenue, followed an earlier trail connecting the area near the Little Miami River with present-day Reading. The Montgomery Turnpike connected Cincinnati with communities to the northeast. Their intersection became known as Cross Roads and supported taverns and other businesses serving travelers.

According to local tradition, Revolutionary War veteran Samuel Pierson gave the community its later name after describing a burial site overlooking the Mill Creek valley as “a pleasant ridge.”

James C. Wood, identified in early histories as the area's first permanent settler, purchased 660 acres (2.7 km^{2}) from McFarland in 1809. After Wood's death in 1824, the property was divided among his heirs and the community was platted. A post office opened in 1832, when the community had approximately 100 residents.

The community became known as Pleasant Ridge during the nineteenth century. It remained principally agricultural, with businesses clustered around the crossroads, until residential development accelerated later in the century.

Pleasant Ridge was incorporated as a village in 1891 after its population exceeded 1,000. John H. Durrell became its first mayor. Municipal improvements included board sidewalks and oil streetlights, and the village established its own council, police and fire services.

On September 23, 1904, the floor of a privy at the Pleasant Ridge School collapsed, causing approximately 30 girls to fall into the vault below. Nine students died. Contemporary investigations attributed the collapse to deteriorated and inadequately secured timbers.

Residents voted 260–174 in favor of annexation by Cincinnati, and Pleasant Ridge officially became part of the city in 1912.

== Geography ==
Pleasant Ridge is bordered by the cities of Norwood and Golf Manor, Amberley Village, the Cincinnati neighborhoods of Kennedy Heights and Oakley, and unincorporated Columbia Township.

The neighborhood is predominantly residential. Its principal commercial corridor follows Montgomery Road, with the traditional business district concentrated near Montgomery Road's intersection with Ridge Avenue.

== Demographics ==
As of the 2020 census, there were 8,895 people and 4,636 housing units in Pleasant Ridge. The racial makeup of the neighborhood was 61.1% White, 27.7% Black or African American, 0.3% Native American, 2.1% Asian, 0.1% Pacific Islander, 2.5% from some other race and 6.3% from two or more races. Hispanic or Latino residents of any race made up 5.2% of the population.

There were 4,162 households, of which 51.2% were families and 44.6% consisted of individuals. Residents under age 18 made up 18.9% of the population, while 69.3% were between 18 and 64 and 11.8% were age 65 or older. The population was 49.1% male and 50.9% female.

According to the 2016–2020 American Community Survey, the estimated median annual household income was $62,150. Approximately 11.9% of families lived below the poverty line, and 50.9% of adults held a bachelor's degree or higher.

== Business district ==
Pleasant Ridge's principal business district is centered on Montgomery Road near its intersection with Ridge Avenue. The intersection developed as a crossroads along the nineteenth-century Montgomery Turnpike and remains the neighborhood's commercial center.

Several independently owned businesses have operated in the district for decades. Pleasant Ridge Chili, a family-operated Cincinnati-style chili parlor, opened on Montgomery Road in 1964. Everybody's Records opened nearby in 1978 and became one of Cincinnati's longest-running independent record stores. Queen City Comic & Card Company opened its Pleasant Ridge location in 1987.

During the 2010s, the Pleasant Ridge Development Corporation supported the rehabilitation of several formerly vacant properties in the district. These included 6099 Montgomery Road, a nineteenth-century building that had previously served as a stagecoach hotel. The redevelopment brought additional restaurants and entertainment businesses to the district alongside its older establishments.

In 2019, the city redesigned the Montgomery Road and Ridge Avenue intersection following requests from residents and business owners for pedestrian-safety improvements.

== Education ==
Cincinnati Public Schools operates Pleasant Ridge Montessori School on Montgomery Road. Formerly Pleasant Ridge Elementary School, it began converting to the Montessori method during the 2006–07 school year. It became the district's first neighborhood, non-magnet Montessori elementary school. The conversion and construction of a new school building were part of a community-led effort begun in the mid-2000s. The building was expanded in 2024 to provide additional classrooms, offices and cafeteria space.

Nativity School, a private Catholic elementary school serving kindergarten through eighth grade, opened in Pleasant Ridge in 1921.

== Culture and recreation ==
The Cincinnati Recreation Commission operates the Pleasant Ridge Recreation Center on Ridge Avenue. The recreation complex includes a public swimming pool and the 1000 Hands Playground. The playground was constructed in 2000 through the work of more than 3,000 community volunteers and renovated in 2013.

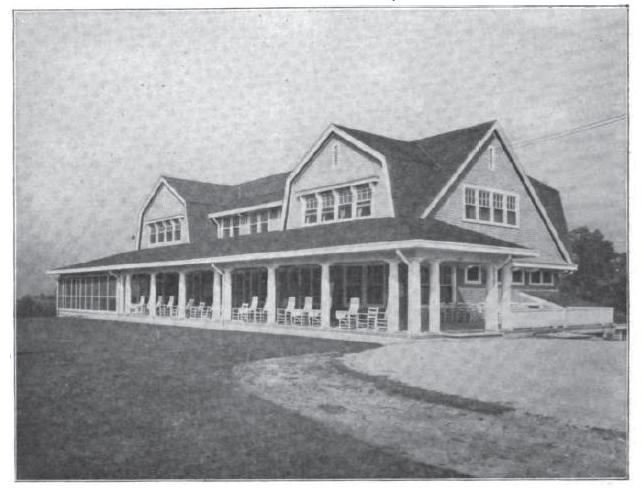
The Losantiville Country Club clubhouse

Losantiville Country Club, a private country club in Pleasant Ridge, was founded in 1902 in response to the exclusion of Jewish residents from other Cincinnati country clubs. Its 18-hole golf course was designed by golf-course architect Tom Bendelow.

In 2008, organizations in Pleasant Ridge and neighboring Kennedy Heights formed District A, an initiative intended to promote arts-based community and economic development along the Montgomery Road corridor.

Ridge Day is an annual neighborhood festival first organized by volunteers in 1971. It is held during the first weekend of August and includes live music, food vendors, artisans and family activities.

== Notable people ==
- Reed Ghazala, experimental musician known as the “father of circuit bending”
