= French Park (Amberley, Ohio) =

Public park

- French Park, Amberley Village, Ohio. CC0 photograph by the Public Lands Institute.
- Interactive map of French Park
- Type: Public
- Location: Amberley Village, Ohio
- Coordinates: 39°12′0″N 84°25′20″W
- Area: 275 acres (111 ha)

French Park is a public park located in Amberley Village, Ohio, United States, but owned by the City of Cincinnati.

The park occupies the former estate of Herbert Greer French, who bequeathed the land with red brick manor to the Cincinnati Park Board following his death in 1942. The park, located atop a steep incline, is also home to a creek which visitors can find after a short walk through the woods. There are also a few hiking trails, as well as a covered shelter atop with grilling areas.
