= Golf Manor Synagogue =

Orthodox Jewish synagogue in Golf Manor, Ohio

- Location in Ohio

Religion
- Affiliation: Orthodox Judaism
- Ecclesiastical or organizational status: Synagogue
- Leadership: Rabbi Yosef Alt
- Status: Active

Location
- Location: 6442 Stover Avenue, Golf Manor, Cincinnati, Hamilton County, Ohio 45237
- Country: United States
- Interactive map of Golf Manor Synagogue
- Coordinates: 39°11′23″N 84°27′02″W

Architecture
- Completed: 1967

Website
- golfmanorsynagogue.org

The Golf Manor Synagogue, also known as Congregation Agudas Israel, is an Orthodox Jewish synagogue located at 6442 Stover Avenue, in Golf Manor, a village near Cincinnati, in Hamilton County, Ohio, in the United States.

== History ==
The synagogue was founded by immigrants from Romania and Poland. The synagogue was founded at an undetermined date as the B'nai Israel Congregation. In 1932, the congregations of Anshei Shalom and Bnai Jacob congregations merged to form Agudas Israel Congregation. In the same year, it moved to a former church in Avondale. In 1952, Rabbi David Indich became the synagogue's spiritual leader. In 1957, it was noted that Golf Manor Synagogue had dedicated the first pre-fabricated synagogue.

In 1967, a new sanctuary for the synagogue of 350 families was built in Golf Manor on Stover Avenue and dedicated a year later. In 1989, Rabbi Balk became the Rabbi of the synagogue, while Rabbi Indich became Rabbi Emeritus. By 1994, the congregation had shrunk to a "listed 250 membership units". Toward the end of 2012, Rabbi Balk became Rabbi Emeritus. Rabbi Pinchas Landis became the new rabbi on January 1, 2013; with Rabbi Stuart Lavenda becoming the senior rabbi in October 2014. Lavenda maintained that role until his retirement March 2019, being succeeded by Rabbi Yosef Alt who took leadership of Golf Manor Synagogue as head rabbi in January 2019.
