= Nativity School (Cincinnati, Ohio) =

Coordinates: 39°10′48″N 84°25′36″W

Location
- 5936 Ridge Ave. Cincinnati, Hamilton, Ohio 45213; United States

Information
- School type: Elementary school
- Religious affiliation: Catholic
- Established: 1921
- Principal: Jason Fightmaster
- Grades: K – 8
- Pastor: Fr. Pat Sloneker
- Website: www.nativity-cincinnati.org

Nativity School is a private, coeducational Catholic school serving kindergarten through eighth grade in the Pleasant Ridge neighborhood of Cincinnati, Ohio. It is the parish school of Transfiguration of Our Lord Parish and operates within the Roman Catholic Archdiocese of Cincinnati.

Established in 1921, Nativity has twice received recognition through the National Blue Ribbon Schools Program, in the 1987–88 school year and in 2005. The school is also known for a global-education program that has included international student exchanges since 1980.

== History ==
Nativity of Our Lord Parish was established in Pleasant Ridge in 1917, and Nativity School opened in 1921. The school was initially staffed by the Ursulines of Cincinnati and later by the Sisters of Mercy. Its facilities were expanded in 1928 and again in 1952.

Robert Herring, a Nativity alumnus, became principal in 1984. During his tenure, the school expanded a global-education initiative that had begun in 1979. Nativity was recognized through the National Blue Ribbon Schools Program during the 1987–88 school year and again in 2005.

In November 2003, the pastor of Nativity of Our Lord Parish dismissed Herring, prompting protests by parents, students and alumni. Archbishop Daniel Edward Pilarczyk subsequently stated that the parish's established personnel procedures had to be followed. Herring was reinstated following negotiations in December and remained principal until retiring in 2015.

In 2018, Nativity completed approximately $850,000 in school improvements as part of a $1.2 million renovation of the parish campus. The work built a new gym, converted the former gym into the Mary, Seat of Wisdom Learning Commons, containing the school library, a STEAM instructional area, and spaces for individual and small-group instruction. Other work created a world-language classroom and new administrative offices.

On August 6, 2026, Nativity of Our Lord Parish merged with Holy Trinity Parish, St. John the Evangelist Parish and St. Saviour Parish to form Transfiguration of Our Lord Parish. Nativity School became the parish school serving the combined parish community.

== Academics ==
Nativity follows the graded course of study of the Roman Catholic Archdiocese of Cincinnati and aligns its curriculum with Ohio's learning standards. Religion is taught at every grade level. The curriculum also includes visual and performing arts, world languages and STEAM education.

== Global education ==
Nativity began developing its global-education program in 1979 and sent its first student delegation to Olinca School in Mexico City in 1980. By 2011, the school had partnered with 36 schools in 22 countries.

Students in the upper elementary and middle-school grades have participated in exchanges in which they travel to partner schools and live with host families. Visiting international students similarly stay with Nativity families and attend classes at the school. The program has also incorporated world-language instruction, political and physical geography, international literature, and classroom projects involving visiting students.

The school's Friendship Journey program brought delegations from multiple countries to Cincinnati simultaneously to complete collaborative projects with Nativity students. In September 2010, delegations from Germany, the Netherlands, Poland and Ukraine worked with Nativity students on international science projects. The United States Board on Books for Young People presented the Friendship Journey with its 2011 Bridge to Understanding Award, which recognizes programs that use children's literature to promote international understanding.

Herring received a Global Educator Award from the National Peace Corps Association in 2002 for his work developing Nativity's global-education program. He and Nativity educator Mary Ann Buchino later wrote a book based on the program, Connecting Across Cultures: Global Education in Grades K–8, published in 2011.

== Recognition ==
Nativity received recognition through the National Blue Ribbon Schools Program in the 1987–88 school year and in 2005. In 2004, the school was inducted into the Greater Cincinnati International Hall of Fame in recognition of its international partnerships. The Friendship Journey received the United States Board on Books for Young People's Bridge to Understanding Award in 2011.

== Notable alumni ==
- Andy Blankenbuehler (class of 1984), choreographer and three-time Tony Award recipient. Blankenbuehler began dancing as a child and appeared in productions at Nativity.
