= Fairfax, Ohio =

- Village
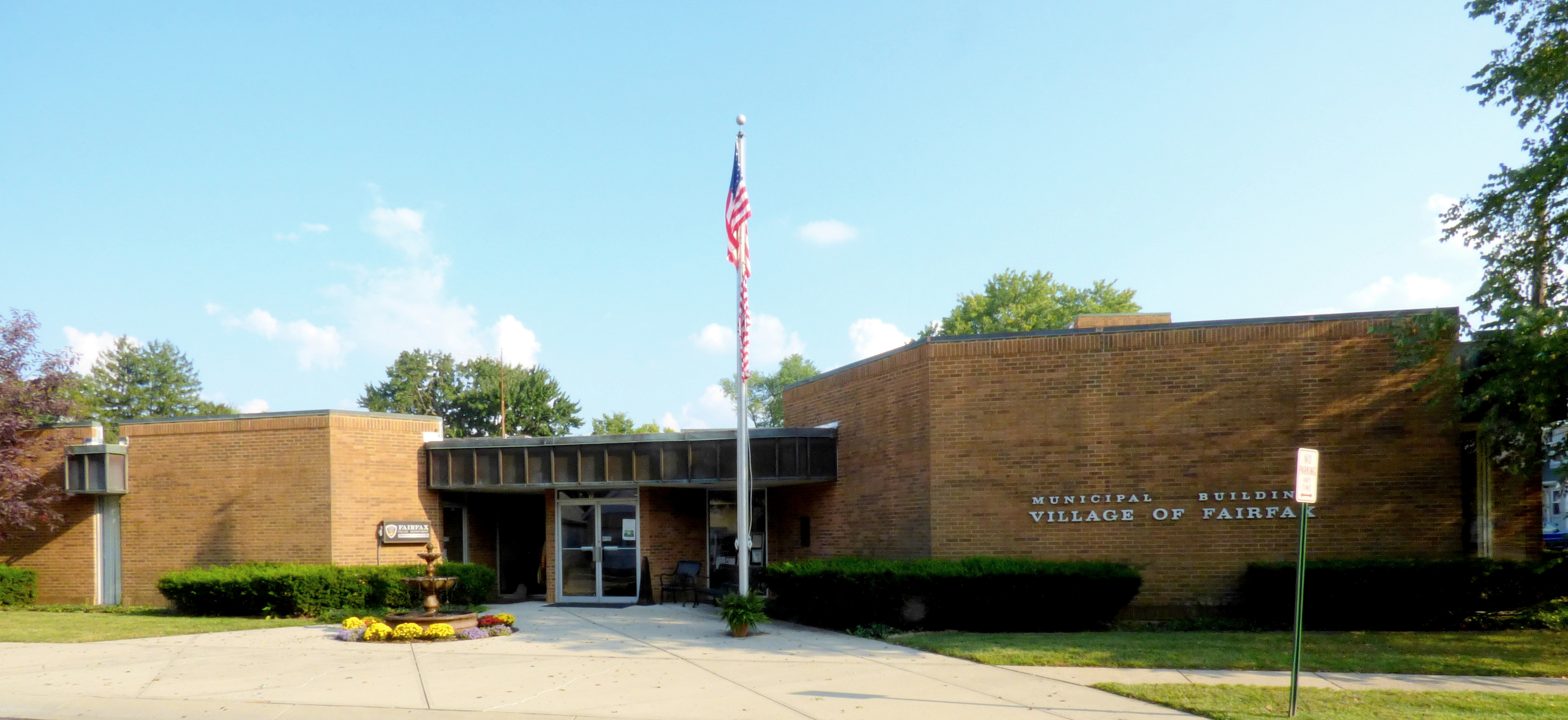
- Fairfax municipal building

- Flag Seal

- Location in Hamilton County and the state of Ohio.
- Coordinates: 39°08′36″N 84°23′46″W
- Country: United States
- State: Ohio
- County: Hamilton
- Incorporated: 1955
- Withdrew from Columbia Township: January 1, 2010

Government
  - Mayor: Sharon Lally

Area
  - Total: 0.78 sq mi (2.02 km^{2})
  - Land: 0.78 sq mi (2.02 km^{2})
  - Water: 0 sq mi (0.00 km^{2})
- Elevation: 545 ft (166 m)

Population (2020)
  - Total: 1,768
  - Estimate (2023): 1,743
  - Density: 2,271.0/sq mi (876.83/km^{2})
- Time zone: UTC-5 (Eastern (EST))
  - Summer (DST): UTC-4 (EDT)
- ZIP code: 45227
- Area code: 513
- FIPS code: 39-25942
- GNIS feature ID: 2398852
- Website: fairfaxoh.com

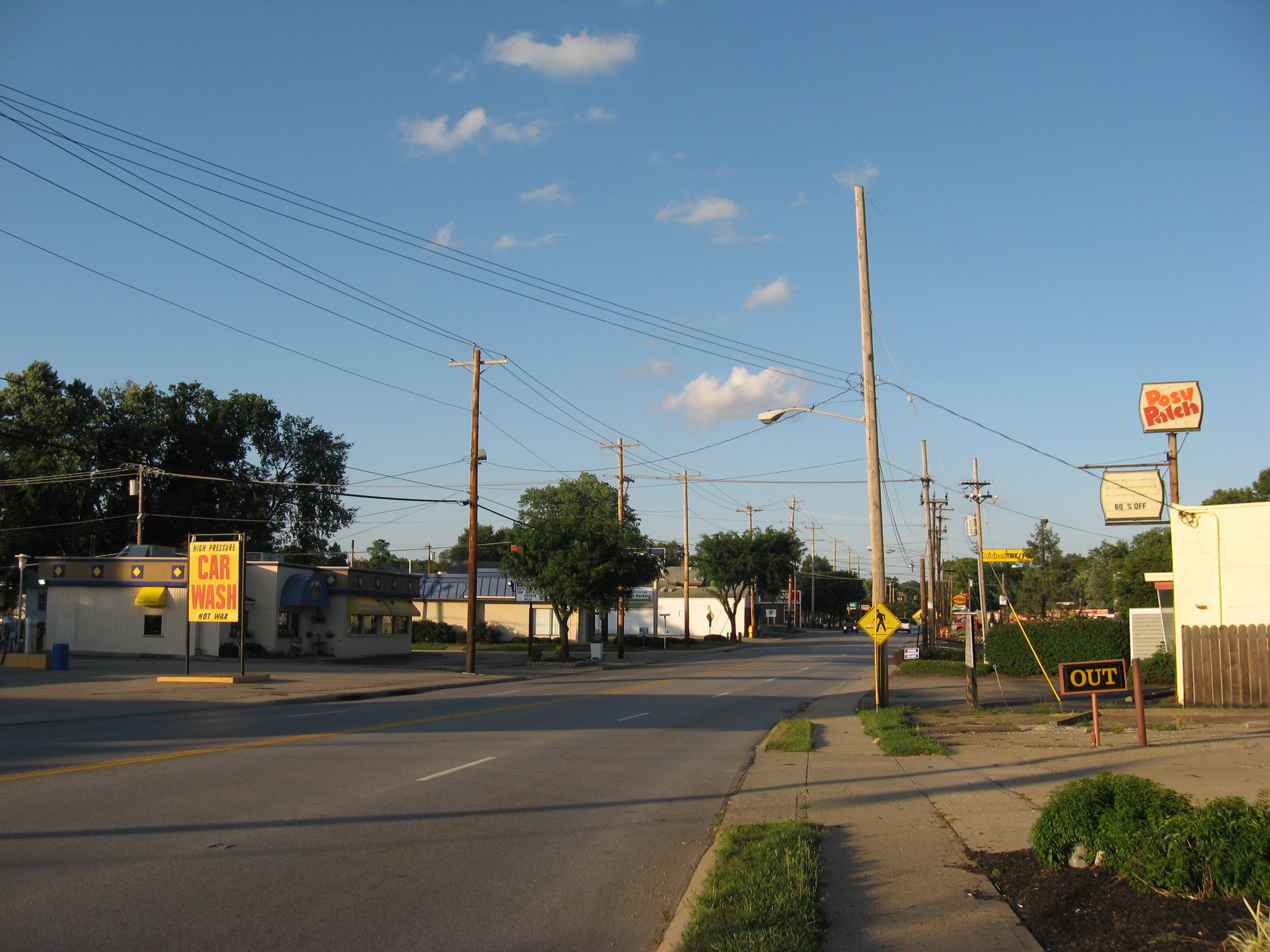
Downtown Fairfax

Fairfax is a village in Hamilton County, Ohio, United States. It is a suburb of Cincinnati. The population was 1,768 at the 2020 census.

== History ==
Fairfax incorporated as a village in 1955 to head off annexation from neighboring Cincinnati but remained connected to Columbia Township after incorporating. On January 1, 2010, it withdrew from Columbia Township by forming a paper township, due in part to city residents' low tax contribution compared to their influence on township elections.

== Geography ==
Fairfax is located at 39°8′34″N 84°23′46″W (39.142760, -84.396188) and has a total area of 0.76 square miles (1.97 km^{2}), all land.

The village is bordered by the City of Cincinnati to the north, west, and south, the Village of Mariemont to the east and south, and Columbia Township to the south. Fairfax borders four City of Cincinnati neighborhoods: Madisonville to the north, Hyde Park and Mount Lookout to the west, and Linwood to the south.

Little Duck Creek runs through Fairfax eventually making its way to larger Duck Creek and the nearby Little Miami River which feeds into the Ohio River. Little Duck Creek splits the village into what residents refer to as "Lower Fairfax", and "Upper Fairfax". Lower Fairfax is a low lying area in the northeast residential portion of the village that has frequently flooded via the creek during heavy rains which has resulted in multiple fatalities. The village has purchased and demolished homes in Lower Fairfax utilizing federal funds to mitigate flood damages.

== Demographics ==
Historical population
Census	Pop.	Note	%±
1960	2,430		—
1970	2,705		11.3%
1980	2,222		−17.9%
1990	2,029		−8.7%
2000	1,938		−4.5%
2010	1,699		−12.3%
2020	1,768		4.1%
2023 (est.)	1,743	▼	−1.4%
U.S. Decennial Census

=== 2020 Census ===
As of the census of 2020, there were 1,768 people living in the village, for a population density of 2,269.58 people per square mile (876.83/km^{2}). There were 774 housing units. The racial makeup of the village was 88.5% White, 2.1% Black or African American, 0.3% Native American, 1.5% Asian, 0.0% Pacific Islander, 0.8% from some other race, and 5.8% from two or more races. 3.4% of the population were Hispanic or Latino of any race.

There were 994 households, out of which 27.4% had children under the age of 18 living with them, 37.3% were married couples living together, 13.0% had a male householder with no spouse present, and 41.8% had a female householder with no spouse present. 36.0% of all households were made up of individuals, and 14.6% were someone living alone who was 65 years of age or older. The average household size was 2.16, and the average family size was 2.91.

22.6% of the village's population were under the age of 18, 62.9% were 18 to 64, and 14.5% were 65 years of age or older. The median age was 37.1. For every 100 females, there were 69.2 males.

According to the U.S. Census American Community Survey, for the period 2016-2020 the estimated median annual income for a household in the village was $68,712, and the median income for a family was $90,670. About 4.0% of the population were living below the poverty line, including 4.7% of those under age 18 and 5.1% of those age 65 or over. About 72.9% of the population were employed, and 50.1% had a bachelor's degree or higher.

=== 2010 Census ===
At the 2010 census there were 1,699 people, 709 households, and 455 families living in the village. The population density was 2,235.5 inhabitants per square mile (863.1/km^{2}). There were 778 housing units at an average density of 1,023.7 per square mile (395.3/km^{2}). The racial makeup of the village was 94.8% White, 2.4% African American, 0.3% Native American, 0.8% Asian, 0.1% from other races, and 1.6% from two or more races. Hispanic or Latino of any race were 1.3%.

Of the 709 households, 34.4% had children under the age of 18 living with them, 41.9% were married couples living together, 16.8% had a female householder with no husband present, 5.5% had a male householder with no wife present, and 35.8% were non-families. 29.5% of households were one person and 9.8% were one person aged 65 or older. The average household size was 2.40 and the average family size was 2.97.

The median age in the village was 37.7 years. 24.4% of residents were under the age of 18; 6.9% were between the ages of 18 and 24; 29.6% were from 25 to 44; 27.8% were from 45 to 64; and 11.4% were 65 or older. The gender makeup of the village was 46.5% male and 53.5% female.

== Education ==
Fairfax feeds into the Mariemont City School District, which includes Mariemont High School. Mariemont Junior High School is the only school in the district that sits within the village.
