= Madison Place, Ohio =

- Census-designated place
- Location within Ohio Location within the United States
- Coordinates: 39°09′17″N 84°22′30″W
- Country: United States
- State: Ohio
- County: Hamilton
- Township: Columbia

Area
  - Total: 0.093 sq mi (0.24 km^{2})
  - Land: 0.093 sq mi (0.24 km^{2})
  - Water: 0 sq mi (0.00 km^{2})
- Elevation: 620 ft (190 m)

Population (2020)
  - Total: 572
  - Density: 6,048.3/sq mi (2,335.28/km^{2})
- Time zone: UTC-5 (Eastern (EST))
  - Summer (DST): UTC-4 (EDT)
- ZIP Code: 45227 (Cincinnati)
- Area code: 513
- FIPS code: 39-46736
- GNIS feature ID: 2812821

Madison Place is a census-designated place (CDP) in Columbia Township, Hamilton County, Ohio, United States, adjacent to the city of Cincinnati. It was first listed as a CDP prior to the 2020 census. The population was 572 at the 2020 census.

== Geography ==
The CDP is in eastern Hamilton County, in Columbia Township. It is bordered to the west and the south by the Madisonville neighborhood of Cincinnati and to the northeast by The Village of Indian Hill. A very small portion of the southeast corner of the CDP is bordered to the south by the village of Mariemont. Downtown Cincinnati is 9 miles (14 km) west of Madison Place.

== Demographics ==
As of the census of 2020, there were 572 people living in the CDP, for a population density of 6,021.05 people per square mile (2,335.28/km^{2}). There were 275 housing units. The racial makeup of the CDP was 67.8% White, 22.7% Black or African American, 0.0% Native American, 2.6% Asian, 0.2% Pacific Islander, 0.5% from some other race, and 6.1% from two or more races. 2.4% of the population were Hispanic or Latino of any race.

There were 172 households, out of which 15.1% had children under the age of 18 living with them, 46.5% were married couples living together, 11.0% had a male householder with no spouse present, and 35.5% had a female householder with no spouse present. 31.3% of all households were made up of individuals, and 11.0% were someone living alone who was 65 years of age or older. The average household size was 2.36, and the average family size was 2.79.

8.1% of the CDP's population were under the age of 18, 44.1% were 18 to 64, and 47.8% were 65 years of age or older. The median age was 59.6. For every 100 females, there were 88.8.

According to the U.S. Census American Community Survey, for the period 2016-2020 the estimated median annual income for a family in the CDP was $143,800. About 46.6% of the population were living below the poverty line, including 100.0% of those under age 18 and 28.9% of those age 65 or over. About 42.6% of the population were employed, and 54.6% had a bachelor's degree or higher.
