= Kennedy Heights, Cincinnati =

Coordinates: 39°11′08″N 84°24′30″W

Kennedy Heights
- Neighborhood of Cincinnati
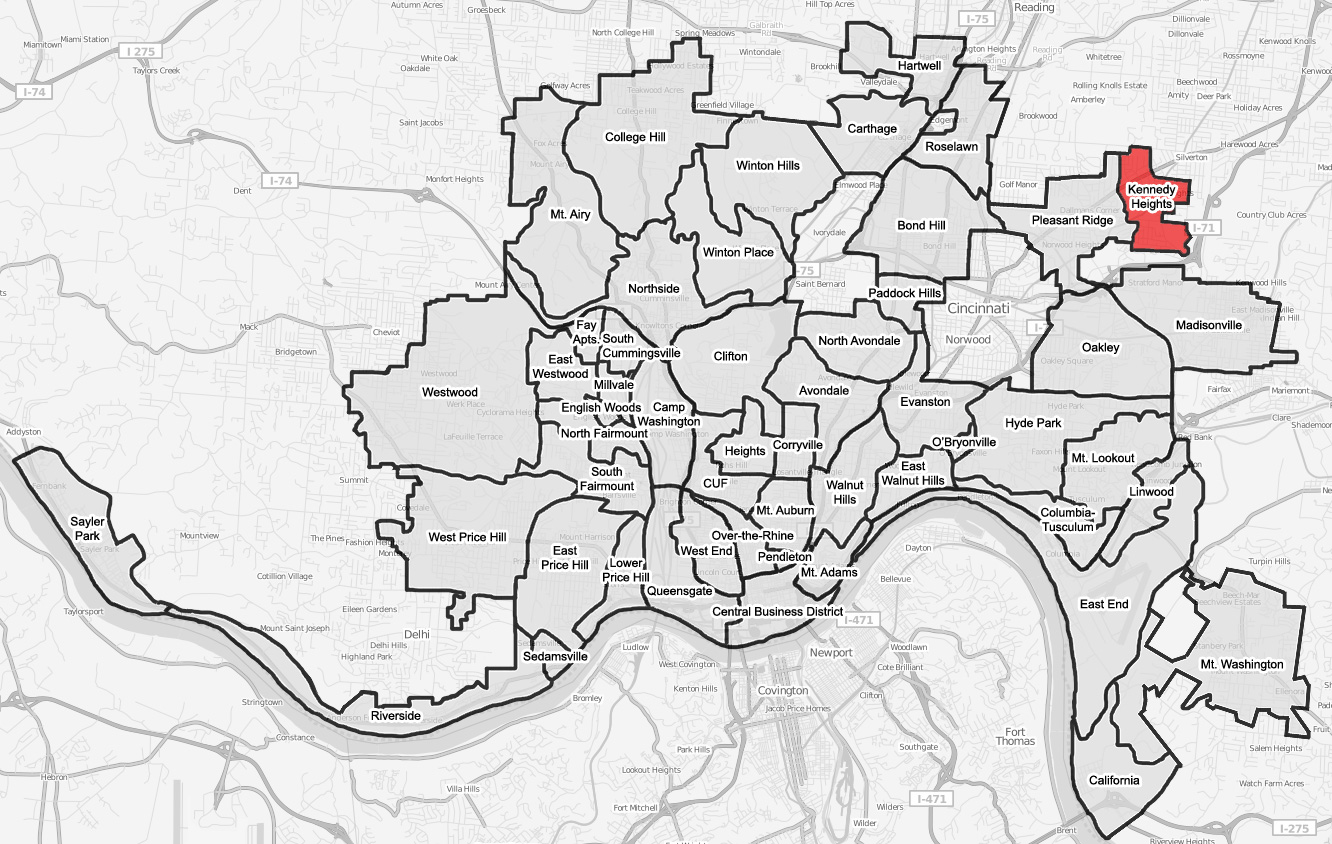
- Kennedy Heights (red) within Cincinnati, Ohio
- Country: United States
- State: Ohio
- County: Hamilton
- City: Cincinnati

Population (2020)
  - Total: 5,166

Kennedy Heights is one of the 52 neighborhoods of Cincinnati, Ohio. The population was 5,166 at the 2020 census.

== History ==
The land that became Kennedy Heights was originally part of Columbia Township and the tract acquired by John Cleves Symmes from Congress. John McFarland established an outpost in the area in 1795. By the middle of the 19th century, English and German farmers occupied much of the land northeast of Pleasant Ridge.

Suburban development followed the arrival of the Cincinnati Northern Railroad in 1882. Lewis Kennedy, a commission and seed merchant, purchased property between Pleasant Ridge and Silverton and filed plans for a subdivision in 1885. Kennedy and his associates promoted it as a park-like alternative to the crowded city. They planted trees, created large residential lots and named streets for English writers, including William Davenant, Charles Dickens and Thomas Wyatt.

The best-known feature of the early development was the Yononte Inn, a 50-room Queen Anne–style resort designed by Cincinnati architect A. O. Elzner. It stood on a ridge overlooking the Little Miami Valley and was marketed to Cincinnati residents as a summer retreat. The inn closed in 1907 and burned two years later.

Kennedy Heights grew from several separate subdivisions, which made the formation of a unified village difficult. Residents sought incorporation in 1890, but objections from farmers and other property owners delayed the process. The village was finally organized in 1896 following a decision by the Supreme Court of Ohio. Its population increased from about 200 in 1900 to 625 in 1910.

As it grew, the village added water service, electricity, street lighting and public transportation. Sewers proved more difficult and expensive. The loss of part of the local school district's tax base after the annexation of Pleasant Ridge added to the financial strain. Cincinnati took over the Kennedy Heights school district in December 1913 and formally annexed the village on July 24, 1914.

A small Black community had developed near Red Bank Road by the early 20th century. Its residents established Kennedy Heights First Baptist Church in 1914 after encountering exclusion from another neighborhood congregation.

The neighborhood underwent substantial racial change after World War II. In the early 1960s, some real-estate agents used blockbusting and racial steering as African American families moved into previously white sections of Kennedy Heights. Black and white residents responded by organizing the Kennedy Heights Community Council in 1963.

The council promoted stable integration rather than attempting to prevent racial change. It challenged blockbusting, encouraged residents not to engage in panic selling and brought Black and white neighbors together to address housing, education and development. Kennedy Heights subsequently became known as one of Cincinnati's intentionally integrated communities.

In 2004, residents organized to save Lewis Kennedy's former home from demolition and converted it into the Kennedy Heights Arts Center. The City of Cincinnati assisted with the purchase, and neighborhood residents helped provide the financial backing.

The neighborhood later redeveloped a long-vacant grocery store near Montgomery Road and Kennedy Avenue. The Kennedy Heights Cultural Campus opened there in August 2015 after nearly six years of planning. It provides space for arts programming, performances, artist studios, digital-media education and the Kennedy Heights Montessori Center.

== Geography ==
Kennedy Heights shares its border with Pleasant Ridge and Silverton.

== Demographics ==
As of the census of 2020, there were 5,166 people living in the neighborhood. There were 2,716 housing units. The racial makeup of the neighborhood was 31.5% White, 58.4% Black or African American, 0.5% Native American, 0.9% Asian, 0.0% Pacific Islander, 3.0% from some other race, and 5.7% from two or more races. 4.5% of the population were Hispanic or Latino of any race.

There were 2,564 households, out of which 44.9% were families. 50.0% of all households were made up of individuals.

15.9% of the neighborhood's population were under the age of 18, 65.9% were 18 to 64, and 18.2% were 65 years of age or older. 47.4% of the population were male and 52.6% were female.

According to the U.S. Census American Community Survey, for the period 2016-2020 the estimated median annual income for a household in the neighborhood was $52,991. About 5.9% of family households were living below the poverty line. About 31.7% had a bachelor's degree or higher.

== Parks ==
Daniel Drake Park and Kennedy Heights Park are located in the neighborhood.
