= Kennedy Heights Park =

Urban park in Cincinnati, Ohio, United States

Coordinates: 39°10′52″N 84°24′58″W

Kennedy Heights Park is an urban park in the Kennedy Heights neighborhood of Cincinnati, Ohio, United States. The 12.4-acre (5.0 ha) park was established in 1930. It features an historic 1937 shelter, playground and soccer field.
