= Benham Mound =

Archaeological site in Ohio, United States

- U.S. National Register of Historic Places
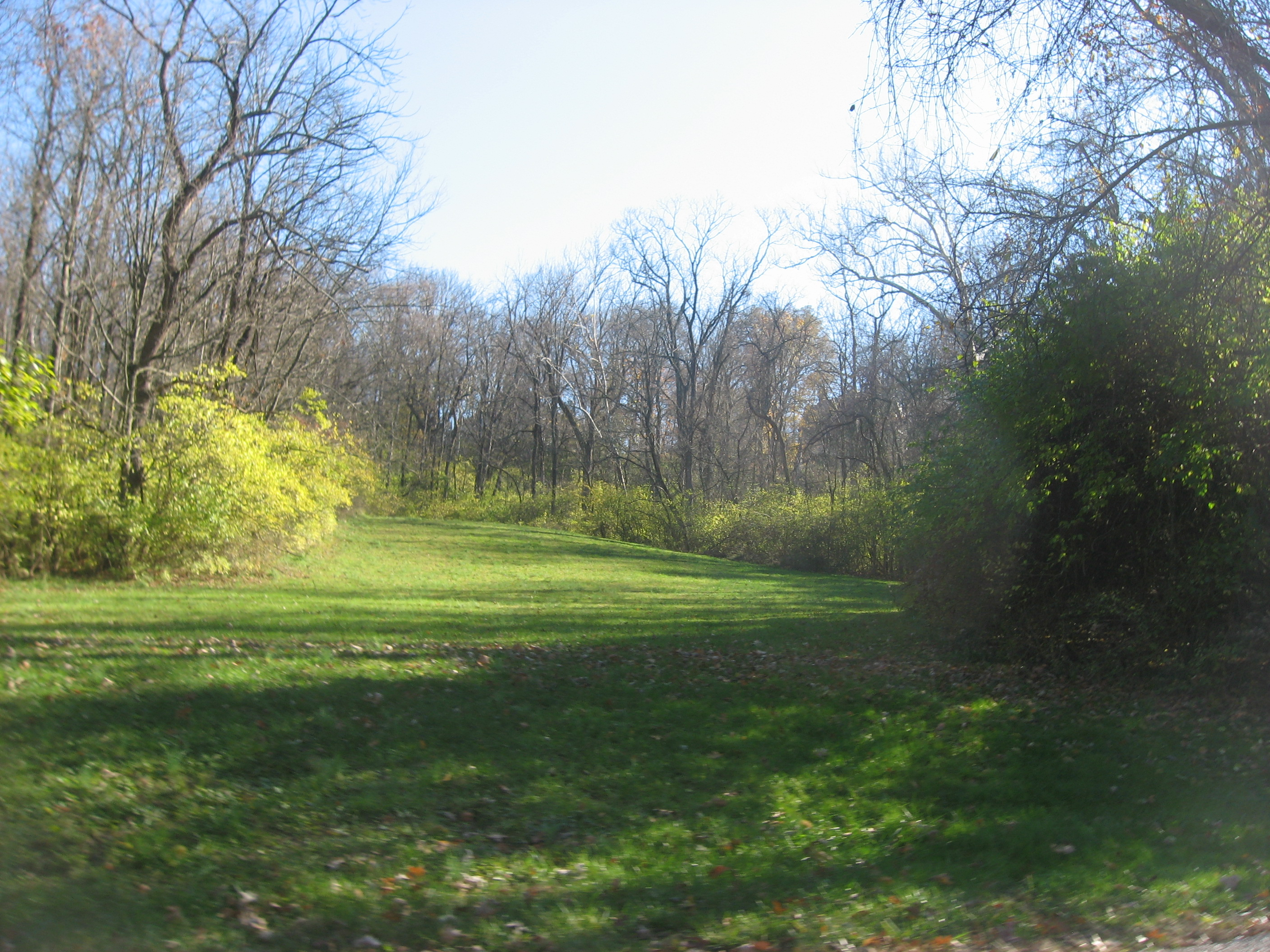
- Looking up a hillside toward the mound

- Location within Ohio Location within the United States
- Location: Section 30 of the original Columbia Township, off Montgomery Road
- Nearest city: Amberley, Ohio
- Coordinates: 39°11′38.55″N 84°25′16.97″W
- Area: 1 acre (0.40 ha)
- NRHP reference No.: 74001508
- Added to NRHP: July 30, 1974

The Benham Mound is a Native American mound in the southwestern part of the U.S. state of Ohio. Located in modern Amberley Village in Hamilton County, the mound is an archaeological site.

Benham Mound, a Hopewell tradition burial mound listed on the National Register of Historic Places, French Park, Amberley Village, Ohio. CC0 photograph by the Public Lands Institute.

A volume of Hamilton County history, published in the nineteenth century, described the Benham Mound, named for a local farmer, as "a fine, large mound," which measured 8 feet (2.4 m) high and with a circumference of approximately 200 feet (61 m). Other dimensions exist that suggest a smaller structure that stood approximately 6.8 feet (2.1 m) in height and 57 feet (17 m) in diameter east and west and 50 feet (15 m) north to south. The mound is located on a hilltop that overlooks the valley of a tributary creek that flows west into the Mill Creek, which correlates with Section 30 of the original Columbia Township, near the Montgomery turnpike (now U.S. Route 22), that is, near end of present-day Grand Vista Avenue. The Norwood Mound lies approximately 1.5 miles (2.4 km) to the southwest.

During the late nineteenth century, local residents partially excavated the mound and the ground around it; their diggings revealed significant amounts of mica and diverse types of stone tools, including axes, scrapers, chisels, and flint projectile points. These findings, combined with the location of the mound itself, have led archaeologists to conclude that Benham Mound was built by people of the Hopewell tradition. Because of its archaeological value, the Benham Mound was listed on the National Register of Historic Places in 1974.
