= Amberley, Ohio =

Amberley Village, Ohio
- Village
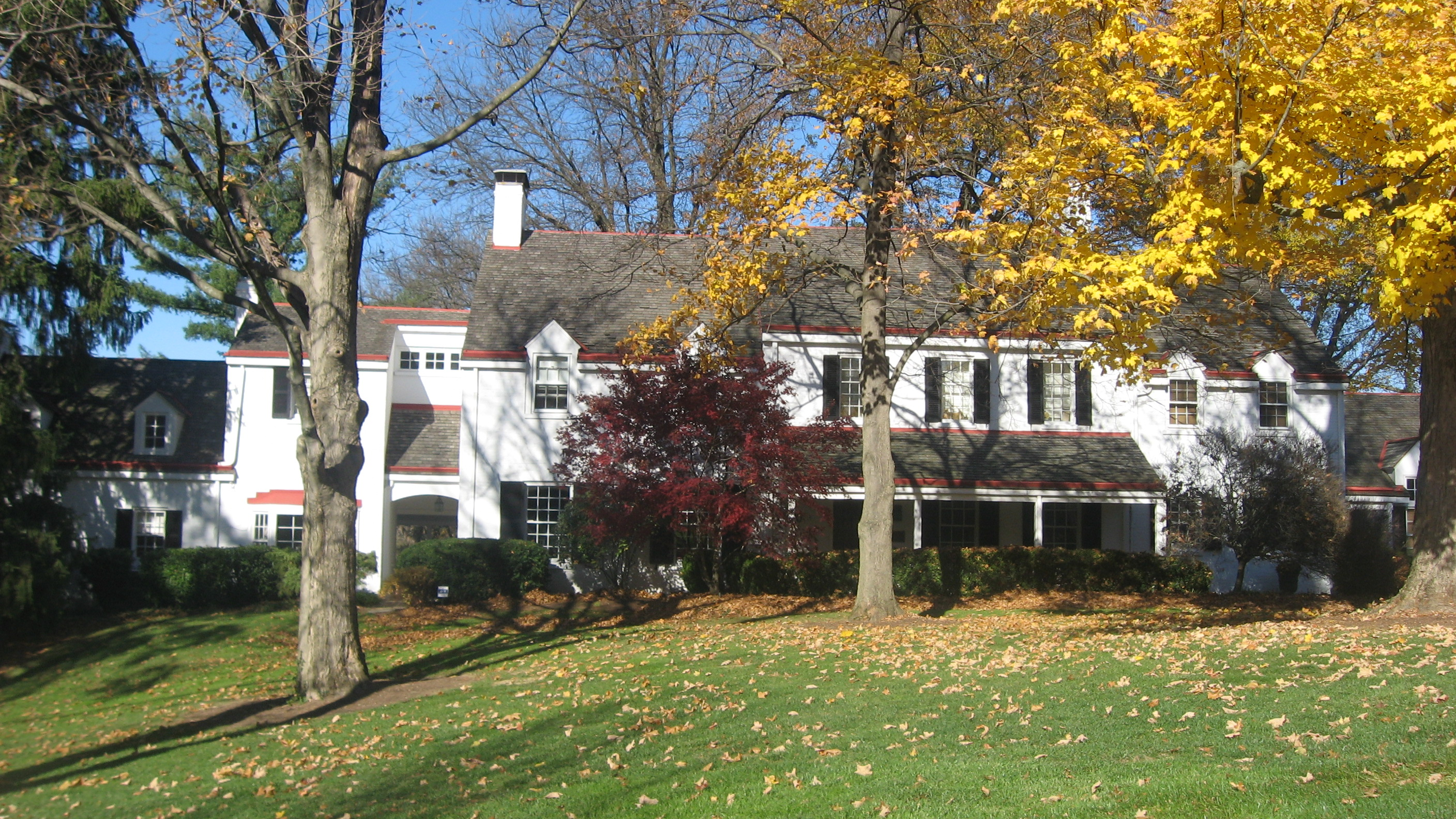
- James Baxter House, built 1807

- Location in Hamilton County and the state of Ohio.
- Coordinates: 39°12′13″N 84°25′42″W
- Country: United States
- State: Ohio
- County: Hamilton

Government
  - Mayor: Bob Rosen

Area
  - Total: 3.48 sq mi (9.02 km^{2})
  - Land: 3.48 sq mi (9.02 km^{2})
  - Water: 0 sq mi (0.00 km^{2})
- Elevation: 801 ft (244 m)

Population (2020)
  - Total: 3,840
  - Estimate (2023): 3,805
  - Density: 1,102.5/sq mi (425.68/km^{2})
- Time zone: UTC-5 (Eastern (EST))
  - Summer (DST): UTC-4 (EDT)
- ZIP Code: 45237, 45213
- Area code: 513
- FIPS code: 39-01672
- GNIS feature ID: 1086196
- Website: www.amberleyvillage.org

Amberley, commonly known as Amberley Village, is a village in Hamilton County, Ohio, United States. A residential suburb of Cincinnati, it had a population of 3,840 at the 2020 census. The village developed rapidly following World War II and became an important center of Cincinnati's suburban Jewish community. It contains several large green spaces, including French Park and Amberley Green.

== History ==
The area that became Amberley was originally part of Columbia Township and remained largely rural into the early 20th century, containing farms and country estates. Evidence of much earlier human activity in the area includes the Benham Mound, a prehistoric earthwork attributed to people of the Hopewell tradition. The mound was added to the National Register of Historic Places in 1974. European-American settlement began near the end of the 18th century. James Baxter purchased approximately 320 acres (1.3 km^{2}) in the area in 1797 and constructed the original portion of the James Baxter House in 1807. The house was added to the National Register of Historic Places in 1994.

Amberley was incorporated as a village on April 5, 1940. The village was named after Amberley, West Sussex, England. Planning, zoning, and the preservation of low-density residential development were prominent concerns during the village's early years. Amberley developed rapidly after World War II, growing from 885 residents in 1950 to 2,951 in 1960. The village adopted the council–manager form of government in 1955, with Rupert Anderegg serving as its first village manager.

Amberley Village has been recognized as a Tree City USA community. According to the village, Amberley first earned the designation in 2005 and has maintained the status in subsequent years.

=== Jewish community ===
Amberley Village became an important center of Cincinnati's suburban Jewish community during the decades following World War II. As Jewish families moved north from Cincinnati neighborhoods such as Avondale and Roselawn, many settled in Amberley before the community expanded farther into suburbs including Blue Ash and Montgomery.

Several established Cincinnati Jewish institutions followed this population movement. Adath Israel Congregation relocated from Avondale to Amberley Village in 1967, and Rockdale Temple, one of the oldest Jewish congregations in the United States, opened its Amberley synagogue in 1969. The Isaac M. Wise Temple congregation opened its Wise Center in the village in 1976. The Mayerson Jewish Community Center opened its present Amberley Village facility in 2008.

== Geography ==
According to the United States Census Bureau, the village has a total area of 3.50 square miles (9.06 km^{2}), all land.

== Demographics ==
Historical population
Census	Pop.	Note	%±
1950	885		—
1960	2,951		233.4%
1970	4,761		61.3%
1980	3,442		−27.7%
1990	3,108		−9.7%
2000	3,425		10.2%
2010	3,585		4.7%
2020	3,840		7.1%
2023 (est.)	3,805	▼	−0.9%

The village has a large Jewish population.

=== 2020 census ===
As of the 2020 census, Amberley had a population of 3,840. The population density was 1,102.50 people per square mile (425.68/km^{2}), and there were 1,433 housing units.

The median age was 46.1 years. 26.2% of residents were under the age of 18 and 24.0% were 65 years of age or older. For every 100 females there were 93.0 males, and for every 100 females age 18 and over there were 92.7 males age 18 and over.

100.0% of residents lived in urban areas, while 0.0% lived in rural areas.

There were 1,368 households, of which 31.8% had children under the age of 18 living in them. Of all households, 73.7% were married-couple households, 8.1% were households with a male householder and no spouse or partner present, and 15.1% were households with a female householder and no spouse or partner present. About 16.7% of all households were made up of individuals and 10.9% had someone living alone who was 65 years of age or older. The average household size was 2.75, and the average family size was 3.24.

There were 1,433 housing units, of which 4.5% were vacant. The homeowner vacancy rate was 0.9% and the rental vacancy rate was 0.0%.

Racial composition as of the 2020 census
Race	Number	Percent
White	3,196	83.2%
Black or African American	273	7.1%
American Indian and Alaska Native	3	0.1%
Asian	152	4.0%
Native Hawaiian and Other Pacific Islander	1	0.0%
Some other race	34	0.9%
Two or more races	181	4.7%
Hispanic or Latino (of any race)	68	1.8%

=== Income and poverty ===
According to the U.S. Census American Community Survey, for the period 2016-2020 the estimated median annual income for a household in the village was $145,893, and the median income for a family was $176,136. About 2.4% of the population were living below the poverty line, including 1.8% of those under age 18 and 6.3% of those age 65 or over. About 67.0% of the population were employed, and 68.5% had a bachelor's degree or higher.

=== 2010 census ===
As of the census of 2010, there were 3,585 people, 1,385 households, and 1,084 families living in the village. The population density was 1,024.3 inhabitants per square mile (395.5/km^{2}). There were 1,466 housing units at an average density of 418.9 per square mile (161.7/km^{2}). The racial makeup of the village was 85.7% White, 9.5% African American, 0.1% Native American, 3.0% Asian, 0.3% from other races, and 1.4% from two or more races. Hispanic or Latino of any race were 1.3% of the population.

There were 1,385 households, of which 29.2% had children under the age of 18 living with them, 71.7% were married couples living together, 4.7% had a female householder with no husband present, 1.9% had a male householder with no wife present, and 21.7% were non-families. 18.1% of all households were made up of individuals, and 9.4% had someone living alone who was 65 years of age or older. The average household size was 2.59 and the average family size was 2.96.

The median age in the village was 49.1 years. 24% of residents were under the age of 18; 4.2% were between the ages of 18 and 24; 15.8% were from 25 to 44; 34.7% were from 45 to 64; and 21.4% were 65 years of age or older. The gender makeup of the village was 47.9% male and 52.1% female.

=== 2000 census ===
As of the census of 2000, there were 3,425 people, 1,338 households, and 1,098 families living in the village. The population density was 985.4 inhabitants per square mile (380.5/km^{2}). There were 1,382 housing units at an average density of 397.6 per square mile (153.5/km^{2}). The racial makeup of the village was 87.42% White, 8.85% African American, 0.09% Native American, 2.39% Asian, 0.32% from other races, and 0.93% from two or more races. Hispanic or Latino of any race were 0.53% of the population.

There were 1,338 households, out of which 28.1% had children under the age of 18 living with them, 75.6% were married couples living together, 4.7% had a female householder with no husband present, and 17.9% were non-families. 15.8% of all households were made up of individuals, and 9.4% had someone living alone who was 65 years of age or older. The average household size was 2.56 and the average family size was 2.86.

In the village, the population was spread out, with 23.0% under the age of 18, 3.3% from 18 to 24, 18.3% from 25 to 44, 31.0% from 45 to 64, and 24.4% who were 65 years of age or older. The median age was 48 years. For every 100 females there were 96.3 males. For every 100 females age 18 and over, there were 92.4 males.

The median income for a household in the village was $81,492, and the median income for a family was $92,684. Males had a median income of $61,220 versus $37,750 for females. The per capita income for the village was $51,225. About 3.5% of families and 3.5% of the population were below the poverty line, including 3.5% of those under age 18 and 5.1% of those age 65 or over.

== Government ==
Amberley Village is governed by a seven-member village council. Five council members are elected from geographic districts, and two are elected at large. The mayor is elected by the members of council. The council also appoints a treasurer, solicitor, and clerk.

=== Public safety ===
Amberley Village operates a combined police and fire public safety department. The department is led by a police/fire chief and provides both police and fire services from the Amberley Village Municipal Building on Ridge Road. The village describes its department as one of two combined police/fire departments in Ohio.

The department includes sworn officers, civilian dispatcher/clerks, and a K-9 unit. Emergency medical services for the village have been provided by the City of Reading since January 1, 2020, while Amberley Village police/fire personnel continue to respond first to emergency scenes.

== Parks and recreation ==
French Park

French Park is a 275-acre (111 ha) public park located within Amberley Village but owned and operated by the Cincinnati Park Board. Formerly the estate of Herbert Greer French, the property was donated to Cincinnati in 1943 along with the French House. The park contains wooded hillsides, meadows, creeks, picnic facilities, and several miles of hiking trails. The French House and its surrounding grounds are used for private and community events.

Amberley Green is a 133-acre (54 ha) village-owned property at Ridge and Galbraith roads. Formerly a golf course, it contains walking and running paths, ponds, wooded areas, a community garden, and tennis and pickleball courts. Municipal Park, located on the grounds of the Village Municipal Building, includes playground equipment, a walking track, fitness stations, and additional tennis and pickleball courts.

The village holds an annual Ice Cream Social that began in the 1990s as a public-safety fair organized by its police and fire department and later developed into a broader community gathering.

== Historic sites and architecture ==
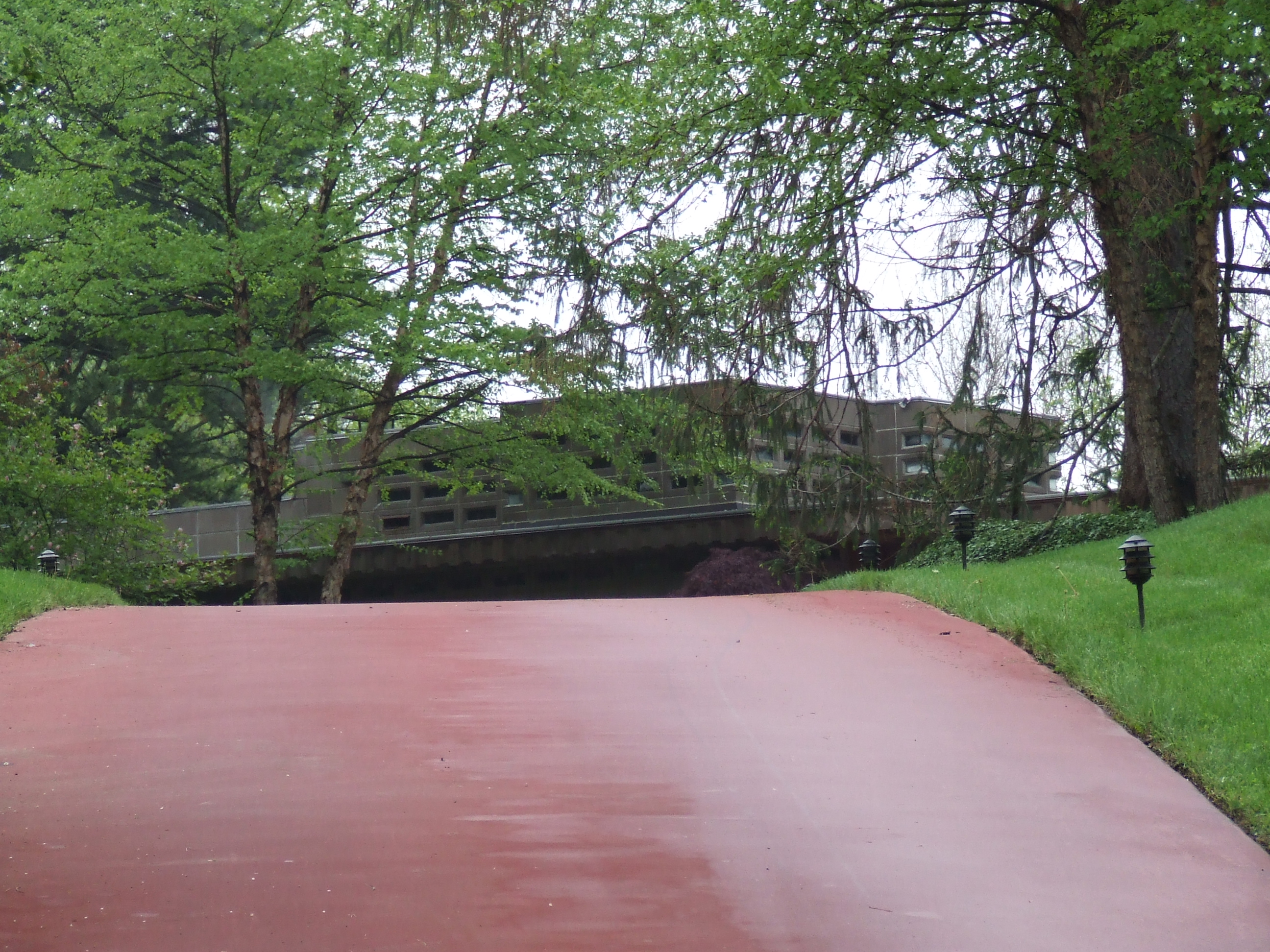
The Gerald B. and Beverley Tonkens House, designed by Frank Lloyd Wright

Several sites in Amberley are listed on the National Register of Historic Places, including the James Baxter House, the Gerald B. and Beverley Tonkens House, and Benham Mound. The James Baxter House, built in 1807, is an early historic residence in the village. The Gerald B. and Beverley Tonkens House was designed by Frank Lloyd Wright in 1954 and is an example of Wright's Usonian Automatic style. Benham Mound is a prehistoric Native American mound located in the village.

== Notable people ==
- Jon Arthur, host of the Saturday morning children's radio series Big Jon and Sparkie
- Max Getz, jeweler and philanthropist
