= Gerald B. and Beverley Tonkens House =

Historic house in Amberley, Ohio

- U.S. National Register of Historic Places
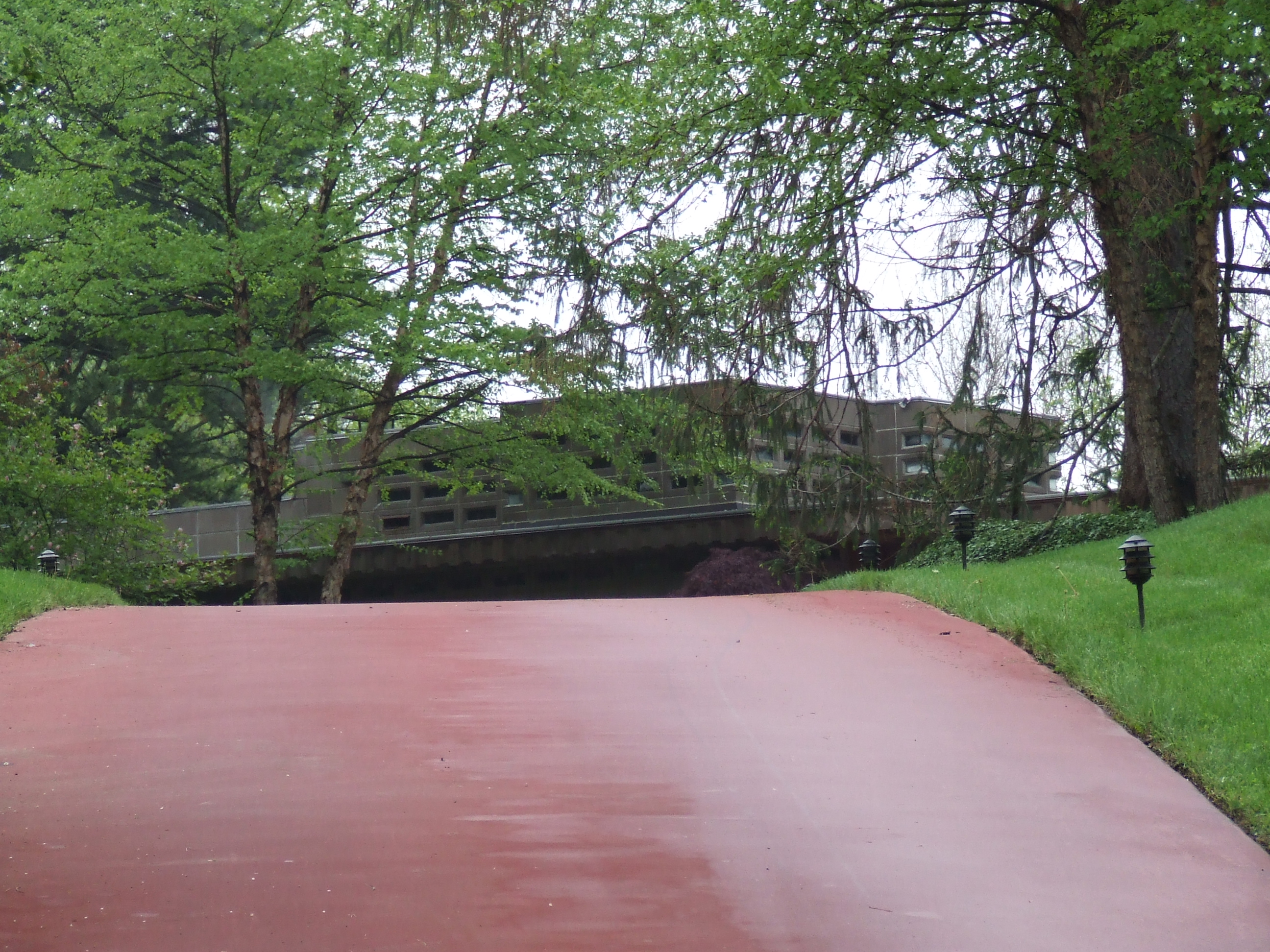
- As viewed from the street

- Location within Ohio Location within the United States
- Interactive map showing the location of the Tonkens House
- Location: 6980 Knoll Road, Amberley, Ohio
- Coordinates: 39°11′44.47″N 84°24′53.45″W
- Built: 1954
- Architect: Frank Lloyd Wright
- Architectural style: Modern Movement and Other
- NRHP reference No.: 91001414
- Added to NRHP: October 3, 1991

The Gerald B. and Beverley Tonkens House (also known as the Tonkens House) is a single-story private residence in Amberley, Ohio, designed by American architect Frank Lloyd Wright in 1954. The house was commissioned by Gerald B. Tonkens (an automobile dealer) and his first wife Rosalie.

Wright designed the home in the Usonian Automatic style and it is considered one of the finest and most intact examples of Usonian Automatic architecture ever produced. It was listed in the National Register of Historic Places on October 3, 1991.

== Description ==
The Tonkens House is a single story, three bedroom, two bathroom private residence, designed in the Usonian Automatic style. The house occupies a 3.54-acre block in Amberley Village, Ohio and measures some 2,100 square feet. An early 20th-century guest cottage also occupies the property, a remnant of its earlier use as a farm.

The Usonian Automatic style was Frank Lloyd Wright's final architectural period and is based on a modular design system that employed interlocking, precast concrete blocks. It was first conceived by Wright in the wake of the Depression in 1936 and later developed in response to a lack of low-cost housing and rising construction costs following the Second World War.

Like many of Wright's Usonian style buildings, the Tonkens House floorplan mimics the shape of a polliwog. The tail of the polliwog is represented by the bedroom wing, with each room opening off into a long, narrow hallway. The hallway leads into 'the body' of the house, a bright and expansive living room or great room, kitchen and foyer. This configuration allowed for additional rooms to be added to the bedroom wing if required. The great room was designed as a large, warm and welcoming space, a room in which the family and their guests could gather.

The master bedroom includes an en-suite and private study, which opens onto a private patio. Ceilings in the bedroom wing are low (7.5 feet) and gilded in 18 karat gold leaf, while those in the great room, kitchen and foyer are high (10.5 feet and 13.5 feet respectively) and unembellished. The great room contains a cantilevered fireplace and east-facing wall of floor-to-ceiling windows and French doors that open onto a lanai at the rear of the house. In typical Frank Lloyd Wright style, Philippine mahogany was used for interior paneling and furniture. Piano hinges (hinges extending from the top to the bottom of a door) were used for all doors in the house, including closet doors.

Eleven styles of precast concrete blocks, reinforced by steel rods, were used for its construction including 492 windows contained within the precast concrete blocks. In lieu of gutters, copper flashing and downspouts were incorporated into its design to allow for water to run off the rubber membrane and pea gravel insulated roof.

Two Wright designed gates guard a Cherokee red concrete driveway leading towards the house. The dwelling has no garage or basement, keeping with Wright's well known dislike for such spaces. Instead, two carports—divided by concrete and glass pillars—and two storage sheds occupy the property.

== History ==
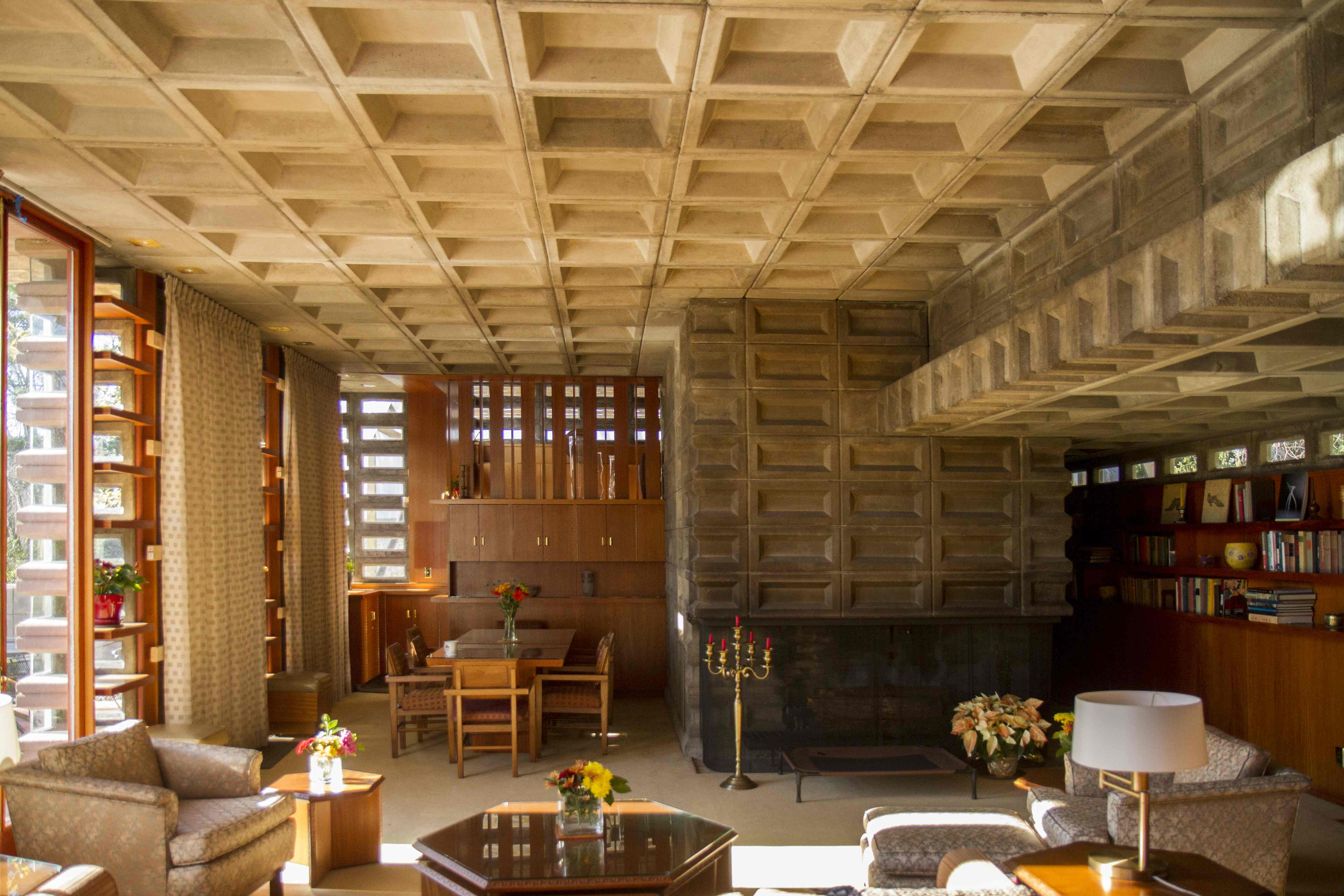
Interior of the Tonkens House showing the great room. The cantilevered fireplace can be seen to the right.

Gerald B. Tonkens was born in Milwaukee, Wisconsin in 1919 where he was exposed to many examples of Frank Lloyd Wright's architecture from a young age. This had a lasting effect on Tonkens, who later stated "I always admired Mr Wright's work. I always knew that I would never build a house on my own unless it was designed by Frank Lloyd Wright".

After graduating from the University of Wisconsin in the early 1940s, Tonkens joined the U.S military, fighting with the Eighth Air Force during World War Two. Tonkens met and married his first wife, Red Cross nurse, Rosalie Robbins, while stationed with the military in Europe.

By 1953 the couple had two daughters and decided to move to Hamilton County, where Gerald established the 'Tonkens Oldsmobile-Cadillac' dealership in Hamilton, Ohio. In 1954 Gerald and Rosalie purchased a 2.75 acre block in Amberley Village, Ohio for $6,000. The land was cheap in comparison to surrounding lots, many of which sold for an average price of $25,000 per acre. When Rosalie queried the price, she was told that the property was considered a "problem lot" as no architect had been able to engineer a driveway up the steep incline from the road to the house. When this was later raised with Wright, he replied "They built the Suez Canal, didn't they? We'll go right up the middle with a big shovel".

Once the purchase was finalized, the couple who were on a tight budget, yet still wanted a Frank Lloyd Wright-esque home, approached a local architect who had studied under Wright in the 1930s. Although early meetings were successful, Gerald and Rosalie were ultimately unhappy with the architect's design and canceled their agreement in early 1954. After some discussion, they decided to contact Wright himself with a proposal for the house and a budget of $25,000. Shortly thereafter, Wright invited them to Taliesin in Spring Green, Wisconsin to discuss the design. Their meeting was a success and the first half of 1954 was spent developing designs for the house via letter and telegram between the Tonkens and Wright's personal assistant Eugene Beyer "Gene" Masselink. In mid-1954 Wright asked if the couple would be interested in being his 'guinea pigs' stating his desire to design their home as "an experiment in Usonian Automatic architecture". They agreed, and Wright's preliminary designs for the home were completed in October.

Drawings for the Tonkens House were completed by Wright, his grandson and apprentice, Eric Lloyd Wright, and John H. "Jack" Howe. John deKoven Hill and Cornelia Brierly were landscape designers on the project. Engineering drawings were completed by William Wesley Peters, Edmond Thomas "Tom" Casey and Mendel Glickman. Glickman was also solely responsible for the ceiling block engineering. Furniture, upholstery and fabric selections for the house were supervised by John deKoven Hill. Final drawings and specifications were presented to Gerald and Rosalie on February 25, 1955, and approved soon after. The 'Tonkens House' was assigned project number 5510 by the Taliesin Foundation.

The final design featured three bedrooms, one study, two bathrooms, Philippine mahogany paneling throughout, a grand living room (the great room) with a cantilevered fireplace, two carports and two storage sheds. A comprehensive furniture plan included built-in pieces as well as Frank Lloyd Wright designed furniture from his collection for Henredon Furniture, and Wright designed upholstery.

=== Construction ===
The Tonkens hired local contractor, Horace Wersel, to be the project lead and Cincinnati firm Harvard Construction Co. to build the house. Construction was overseen by the Taliesin Fellowship, which was represented by Eric Lloyd Wright. Wright spent over a year living in Cincinnati while overseeing the home's construction. Such close supervision was unusual for Wright, and the Tonkens House was the first Usonian Automatic structure to be solely directed by a Taliesin fellow.

The home incorporated Wright's iconic precast concrete blocks. These were made using metal molds into which concrete was poured and then set. The Tonkens house is built using eleven block variations, which allowed for infinite modifications to the design. Masonry subcontractors were used to lay the foundation, while carpentry subcontractors were used to lay the blocks. Blocks were two feet wide by one foot high for walls, and two feet high by two feet wide for ceilings. Blocks were adhered to a reinforced concrete slab, unlike Wright's Californian homes, in which ceiling blocks were adhered to wooden slabs. Concrete blocks for the Tonkens House were made as a lightweight cinder block. Because cinder blocks are porous, a sand based sealer was applied to the exterior of the building to waterproof the house.

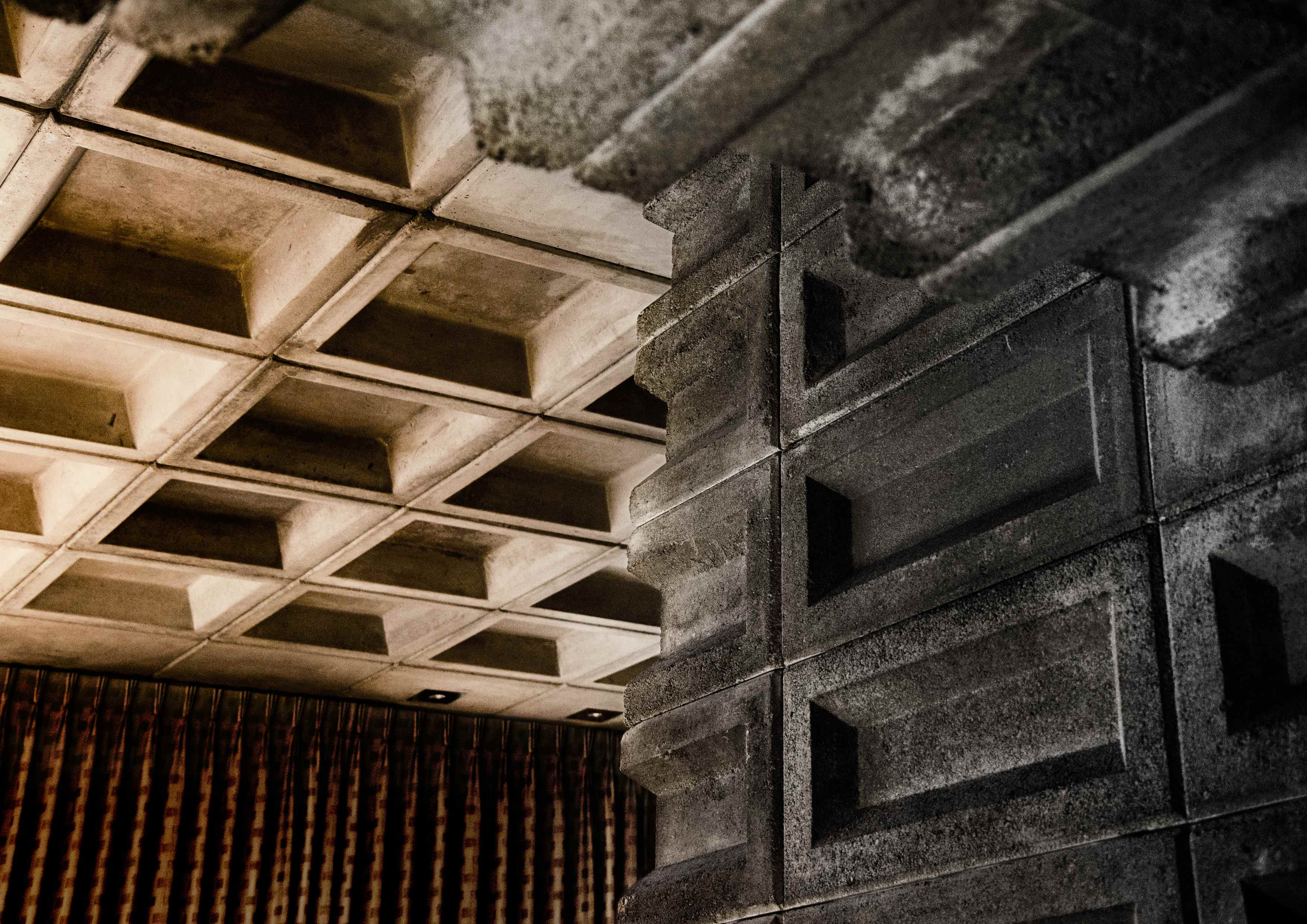
Example of precast concrete blocks in the Tonkens House. Photo courtesy of Toby Oliver.

By mid-1955 the total cost of construction, including Wright's 10 percent fee and additional costs for interior furnishings, was up to $59,000. The increase was due in part to rising values of materials such as steel, concrete and wood. Complications associated with casting concrete blocks also raised construction costs. Expenditure continued to increase throughout the duration of the construction and Cindy Damschroder estimates that the final cost of construction was likely to have been around $118,000.

The Tonkens House was completed in late-July 1956. Frank Lloyd Wright died in 1959. Prior to his death he was in the midst of designing the Beth Sholom Congregation in Elkins Park, Pennsylvania, the Guggenheim Museum in New York City, as well as a number of residential homes and he never saw the Tonkens House completed. He did however meet with the Tonkens soon after construction works had ended, presenting them with a hand signed, Cherokee red glazed tile to attest his approval of the home. The tile was permanently placed on the exterior wall, just outside the front entrance.

=== Variations in design ===
Over the eighteen month construction period, a number of minor changes were made to the original design. These included modifying the driveway, installing additional electrical outlets to the exterior of the house and increasing the size of the master bedroom. A pool was included in initial designs and registered by Taliesin. In late 1955, Eric Lloyd Wright suggested that the planned pool be relocated, since there was only earth fill below the original pool location. Subsequent plans showed that the pool was resized and moved to another location; the pool was ultimately never built in any form. A cabana and covered porch were also envisioned for the site, but these did not make it onto the final designs.

=== Repair and restoration ===
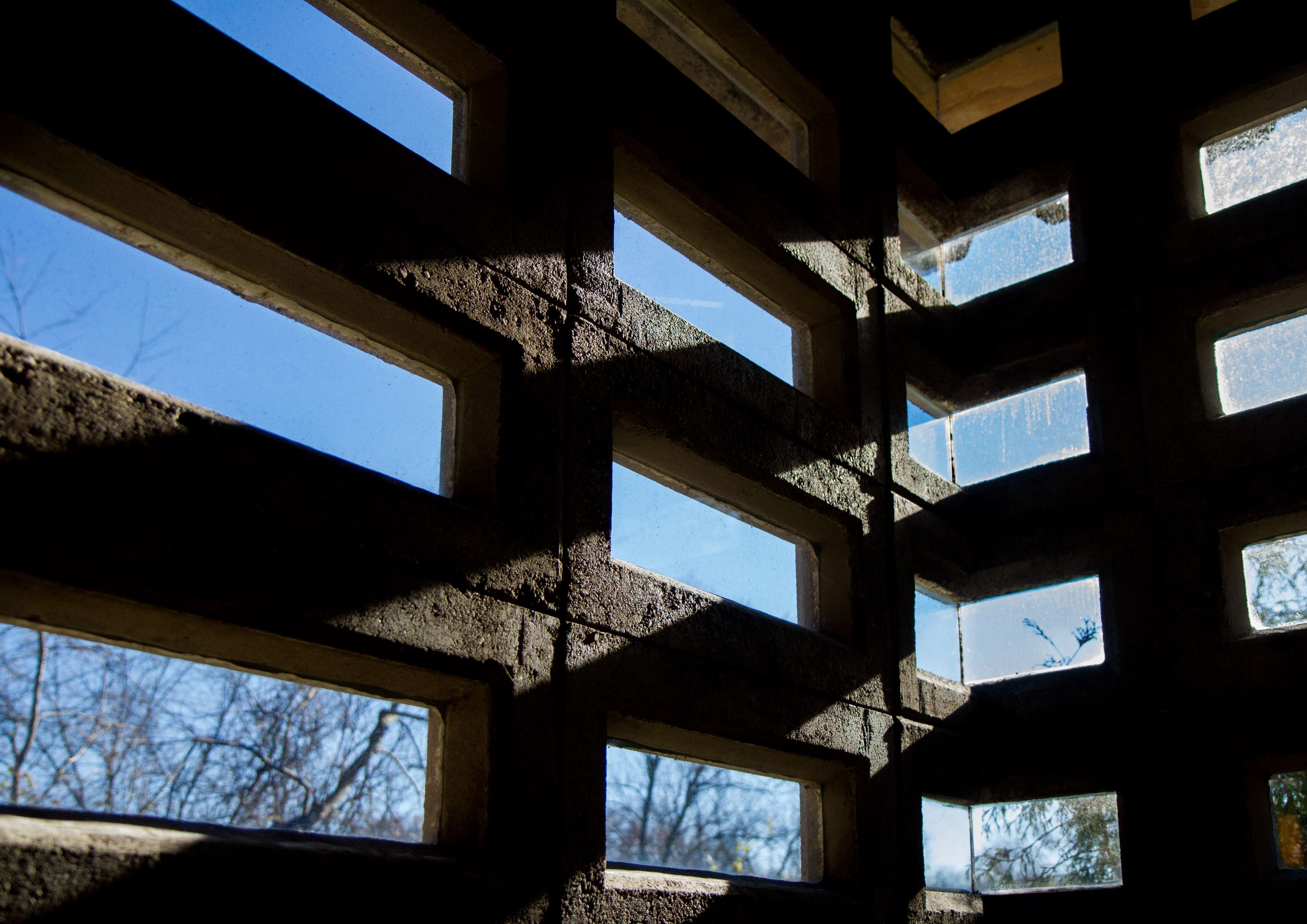
Example of windows set into precast blocks

In July 2001, renovations were undertaken to restore and upgrade the home's aging roof, original plumbing, wiring and kitchen. As works were underway, a heavy rainstorm hit the Greater Cincinnati area. Strong winds blew protective tarp off the roof, exposing it to the heavy downpour. The Philippine mahogany walls and cabinetry in the living room, dining room and kitchen all suffered significant water damage, as did the home's precast concrete block ceiling. These elements required replacement, a project that took almost a year to complete. Care was taken to ensure the renovations were sympathetic to the original design and character of the home and it continues to be the only largely unaltered Frank Lloyd Wright house in the Greater Cincinnati area.

The house was placed for sale in February 2013, for the first time in its history, and was ultimately sold in May 2015. In mid-2015, the new roof was found to have failed. Additional repairs are currently underway, a complex task due to the unique design of the structure.

== See also ==
- List of Frank Lloyd Wright works

== Notes ==
- Storrer, William Allin (1993). The Frank Lloyd Wright Companion. Chicago: University of Chicago Press. ISBN 978-0-226-77624-8. (S.386)
