= Jon Arthur =

American entertainer (1918–1982)

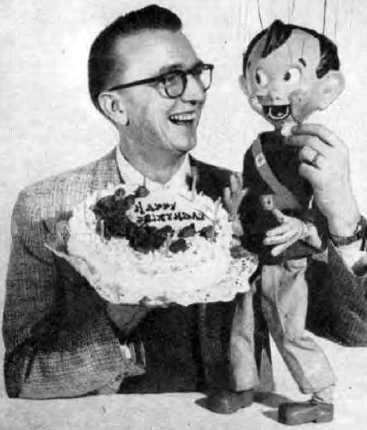
Arthur and Sparkie from No School Today, 1957.

Jonathan Arthur Goerss (June 14, 1918 – February 24, 1982), known as Jon Arthur, was an American entertainer. As Big Jon Arthur, he was the host of the Saturday morning children's radio series Big Jon and Sparkie. Sparkie, "the little elf from the land of make-believe, who wants more than anything else in the world to be a real boy,” was actually the recorded voice of Jon Arthur played at a fast speed.

Arthur was born in New Kensington, Pennsylvania to Rev. Daniel Friedrich Goerss, a Lutheran minister, and Esther Eleanor Leverentz. His parents were both from Niagara County, New York. He was a third-generation German-American; his paternal and maternal great-grandparents all emigrated from Germany. From his home in Pittsburgh, Jon Arthur went to radio school and then began his broadcasting career at radio station WJLS (Beckley, West Virginia), signing on two weeks after the station went on the air in 1939. Arthur later left Beckley for Ogdensburg, New York and soon headed for the West Coast. Arthur died in Alameda County, California in 1982.

== No School Today ==
At WSAI in Cincinnati, Arthur began the Big Jon and Sparkie show, carried daily on 181 ABC stations beginning in 1950. ABC also aired his two-hour Saturday show, No School Today, heard weekly by 12 million listeners on 275 stations. The show's theme song was "Teddy Bears' Picnic" as sung by Ann Stephens. Cincinnati's Don Kortekamp, who was an editor at WSAI, teamed up with Arthur to become the scriptwriter of Big Jon and Sparkie.

Arthur originally created the character of Sparkie as a young scamp who would interrupt him while he was on the air. WSAI's station manager asked Kortekamp and Arthur to expand this into a radio program. Arthur voiced all of the various characters while Kortekamp provided the scripts for their adventures and Donald Poynter, a local businessman in the novelty business, produced a Sparkie puppet. Kortekamp drew on his memories of his childhood in Cheviot, Ohio when creating new characters and the plots for the program. Mayor Plumpfront, the Krausers, Clyde Pillroller, and Eukey Butcha were all based on people he knew while growing up. However, in 1951, the station did not renew its contract with Arthur and the program then moved to new Cincinnati studios to continue its ABC radio broadcasts.

The Saturday morning No School Today usually featured Sparkie's recounting of the latest serial episode of Captain Jupiter, which he and his friend Rabbit Ears McKester saw at the movies. Reference was often made to Captain Jupiter's arch enemies, Montmorency Clutchrider and Ivan Crusingspeed, who seemed to be featured in name only. Listeners could write in to the show and be mentioned in the birthday segment. The song "Happy Birthday, Friend" was sung.

While the program was not able to make a successful transition to television, it found a new life for 20 years (1962 to 1982) on the Family Radio Network. At one point, Kortekamp had plans to try remarketing the characters and their new adventures.

== Other media ==

The radio program was adapted into the comic book, Big Jon and Sparkie, published by Alden Getz for Ziff-Davis. Getz also published The Daily Weekly, a promotional newspaper giveaway based on the No School Today radio program. The comic book ran for four issues.

The radio characters were also among the first media personalities satirized in Mad when Harvey Kurtzman wrote "Big John" and "Sparkie" into "Robin Hood!" in the fourth issue of the comic book.

During the 1960s, Jon Arthur broadcast middays at WKRC in Cincinnati. Arthur's life story was featured on the radio show Unshackled.

== Listen to ==
- No School Today
