= Columbia Township, Hamilton County, Ohio =

Township in Ohio, US

- Township
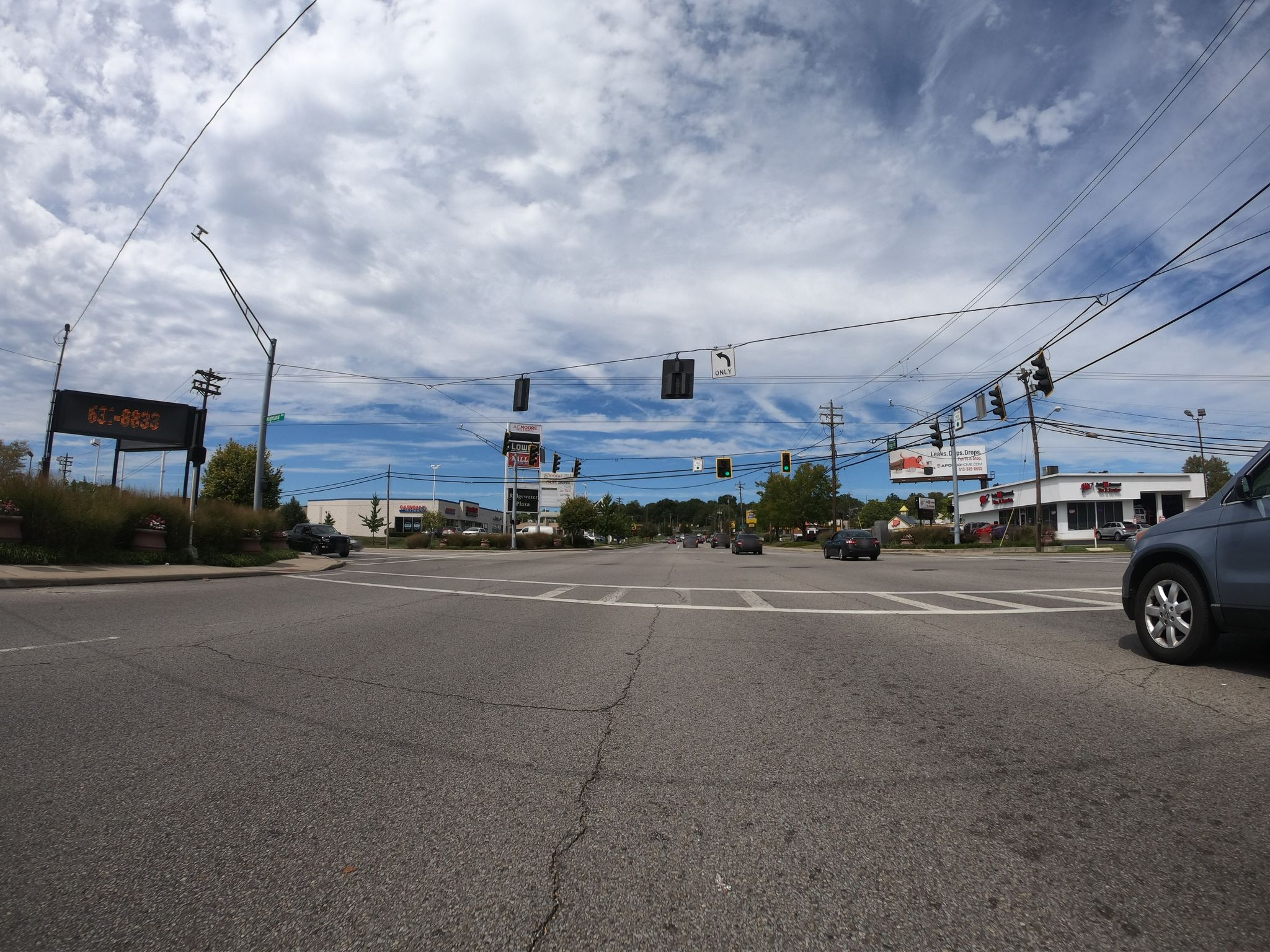
- The intersection of Ridge Road and Highland Avenue in 2019

- Location in Hamilton County in the state of Ohio.
- Coordinates: 39°8′58″N 84°23′3″W
- Country: United States
- State: Ohio
- County: Hamilton
- First Settled: 1788
- Established: 1791
- Named for: Columbia

Government
  - Type: Board of Trustees & Fiscal Officer
  - Administrator: Melissa Taylor

Area
  - Total: 2.7 sq mi (6.9 km^{2})
  - Land: 2.5 sq mi (6.6 km^{2})
  - Water: 0.12 sq mi (0.3 km^{2})
- Elevation: 571 ft (174 m)

Population (2020)
  - Total: 4,446
  - Density: 1,745/sq mi (673.6/km^{2})
- Time zone: UTC-5 (Eastern (EST))
  - Summer (DST): UTC-4 (Eastern Daylight Time)
- Postal code: 45227
- Area code: 513
- FIPS code: 39-16882
- GNIS feature ID: 1086203
- Website: www.columbiatwp.org

Columbia Township is one of the twelve townships of Hamilton County, Ohio, U.S. At its founding in 1791, it was among Ohio's largest townships by area, but gradually shrank to one of the smallest by early 1950s due to annexations by the City of Cincinnati, Norwood, Silverton, Fairfax, Indian Hill, Mariemont and others. The 2020 census found 4,446 residents living in the township.

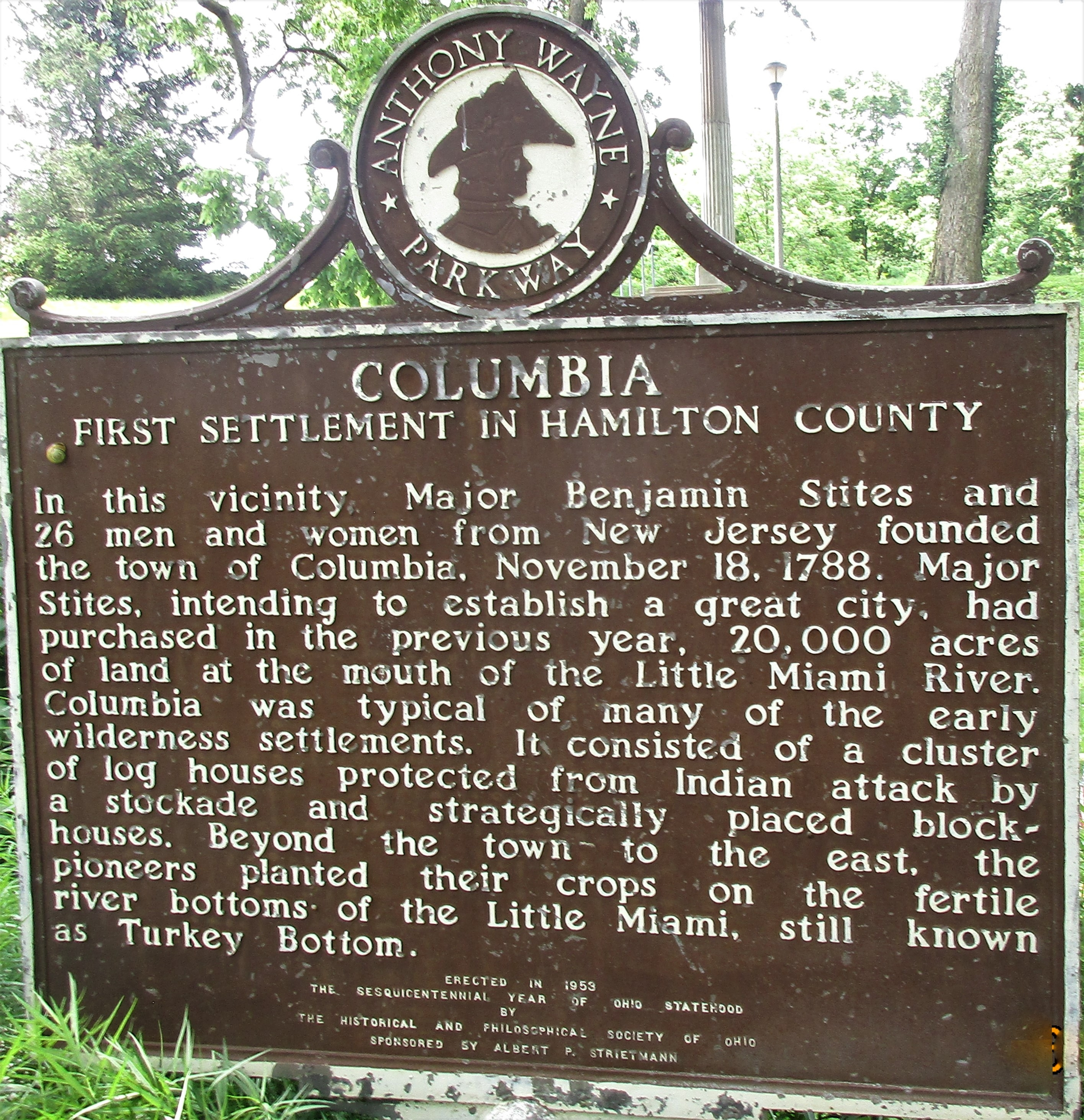
Historic Marker - Columbia settlement

== History ==
Columbia Township was named after the early settlement of Columbia, established in 1788 by a group of pioneers led by Benjamin Stites as part of the United States' expansion into the Northwest Territory. Columbia was part of the Symmes Purchase in 1788, when John Cleves Symmes of New Jersey acquired it from the Continental Congress.This area was the ancestral home of Native American tribes, including the Shawnee, Miami, and Fort Ancient Peoples, who constructed the Fort Ancient Earthworks. Cincinnati annexed Columbia in 1871 and is now named Columbia-Tusculum.

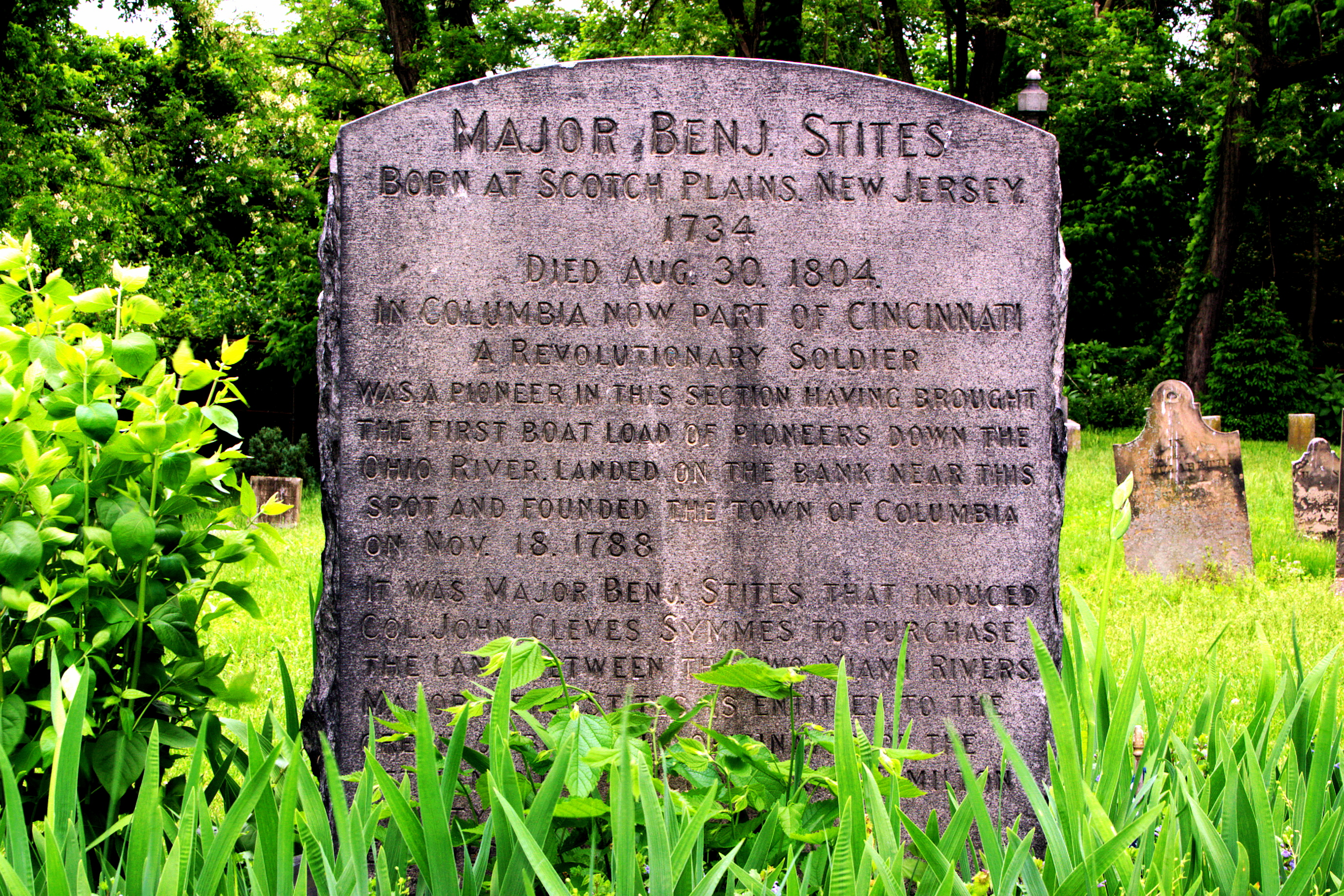
Benjamin Stites headstone d.1804

Columbia Township was formed in 1791, a year after Hamilton County was organized, when the court of general quarter sessions of the peace divided the southern part of the county into Columbia, Cincinnati, and Miami townships, each extending from the Ohio River north, past the present-day Butler County line. Each township was assigned a standard cattle brand; historians have considered Columbia Township to be the county's first township; on account of being issued cattle brand "A". The township's boundaries were defined as

Columbia Township was one of the largest townships in Ohio, larger than some present-day counties. The three townships included virtually all Anglo-American residents of the Symmes Purchase; in the midst of the Northwest Indian War, battles often small-scale, tit-for-tat series of armed skirmishes that pitted Indigenous Native American tribes against white settlers and the United States military continued until the Treaty of Greenville.

The township gradually shrank as Hamilton County's population grew. In 1795, upon the signing of the Treaty of Greenville, the court of general quarter sessions of the peace created Deerfield and Dayton townships out of the northern reaches of Columbia Township. In 1803, the county commissioners created Sycamore Township from the northern half of Columbia Township and, in turn, created Symmes Township from Sycamore Township's eastern half between 1820 and 1826. In the early 1840s, Spencer Township was carved out of the southwestern part of Columbia Township.

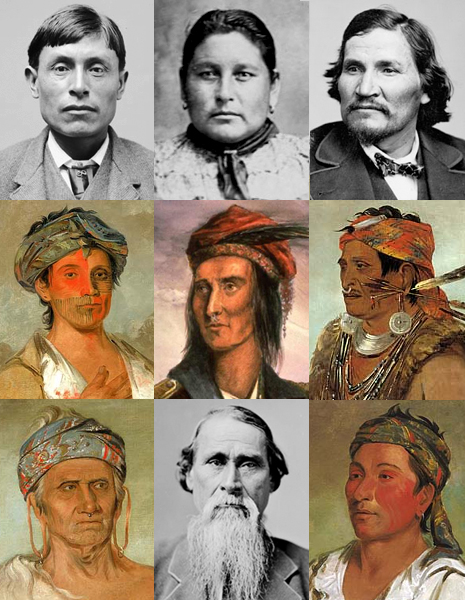
Shawnee portraits

In 1861, the United States Army built Camp Dennison on 500 acres (200 ha) in the northeastern corner of the township.

In 1876, Madisonville became the first village to incorporate within the township, followed by Norwood in 1881, Pleasant Ridge in 1891, and Terrace Park in 1893. The township's population grew further as the Cincinnati Street Railway extended lines further into the suburbs between 1890 and 1910. Cincinnati annexed Madisonville, Pleasant Ridge, Oakley, and Kennedy Heights between 1911 and 1914.

From the 1920s, car ownership spurred additional growth in the southwestern corner of the township. Mariemont was developed as a car-centric community in 1922. The completion of Columbia Parkway in 1938 caused Cincinnati to annex surrounding unincorporated land, leading Indian Hill and Mariemont to incorporate as villages in 1941, followed by Fairfax in 1951. Unlike in other parts of Ohio, most villages in southwestern Ohio withdrew from their surrounding townships via paper townships, reducing the township to one of the smallest in Ohio by the early 1950s. One exception was Fairfax, which only withdrew on January 1, 2010, due in part to city residents' low tax contribution compared to their influence on township elections.

Columbia Township invested $75,000 through its partnership to support Mariemont's development of the next segment of the Murray Path extension, a rail trail. In 2021 the path was extended to Columbia's Plainville Business District and historic Madison Place neighborhood.

== Land parcels ==
Located in the eastern part of Hamilton County, Ohio, the township currently consists of eight disconnected parcels:

1. Ridge & Highland/Red Bank is the largest parcel in the township. Its western part contains several big-box stores, its central part mainly contains a segment of Interstate 71, and its eastern part contains a few residential subdivisions. It is mainly surrounded by the Cincinnati neighborhoods of Kennedy Heights, Pleasant Ridge, and Madisonville, but is bordered by Silverton and Madeira to the northeast.
2. Norwood Green is the westernmost parcel, mainly of Fenwick Park. It is bordered by Norwood to the south and Pleasant Ridge in Cincinnati to the north.
3. Ridgewood contains a residential subdivision. It is bordered by Amberley to the north and east, Pleasant Ridge in Cincinnati to the south, and Golf Manor to the west.
4. The Stewart Road Area is the northernmost parcel, containing residences. It borders Sycamore Township on the north, Madeira to the east, and Silverton to the west
5. The Camargo Road Area is mostly wooded with a few residences on its eastern fringe. It is bordered by Madeira to the north, Indian Hill to the east, and Madisonville in Cincinnati to the west.
6. Madison Place covers two parcels each of which is a residential subdivision. These border Indian Hill to the east, Madisonville in Cincinnati to the west, and Mariemont to the south.
7. Plainville is a parcel that stretches along the northern bank of the Little Miami River; it contains a commercial district and some residential subdivisions in its central portion but is otherwise mainly undeveloped. It borders Fairfax to the west, Mariemont and Indian Hill to the north, Terrace Park to the east, and Anderson Township to the south.
8. Camp Dennison, the northeasternmost parcel, is mostly wooded but contains a public works facility of the Village of Indian Hill. It is bordered by the separate Camp Dennison CDP in Symmes Township to the north, Miami Township, Clermont County to the east, Milford to the south, and Indian Hill to the west.

Some of the remaining township lands, which cover only about 2.5 sq mi (6 km^{2}), are unsuitable for development, especially along the banks of the Little Miami River.

== Demographics ==
Historical population
Census	Pop.	Note	%±
1820	2,814		—
1850	2,413		—
1860	2,931		21.5%
1870	3,184		8.6%
1880	5,306		66.6%
1890	8,422		58.7%
1900	12,885		53.0%
1910	23,387		81.5%
1920	21,947		−6.2%
1930	36,338		65.6%
1940	14,825		−59.2%
1950	23,545		58.8%
1960	31,636		34.4%
1970	26,037		−17.7%
1980	6,428		−75.3%
1990	6,298		−2.0%
2000	6,557		4.1%
2010	4,532		−30.9%
2020	4,446		−1.9%

Township Census Snapshot

- Total Population: 4,446
- Median Household Income: $54,316
- Bachelor's Degree or Higher: 50.3%
- Employment Rate: 68.1%
- Total Housing Units: 2,165
- Without Health Care Coverage: 6.8%

Populations & People - As of the 2020 U.S. Census Bureau, the median age within the township was 32. Languages spoken at home were 93.4% English, 3.6% Spanish, 2.9% Other Indo/European, and 0.2% Asian/Pacific Island languages. The township ages under 18 were 20.1%, 18-65 is 56.6%, and over 65 was 13.3%.

Income & Poverty - According to the U.S. Census Bureau, the estimated median household income for the township was $54,316. Income breakdown by family types: Families - $99,688; Married couple families - $138,730; Nonfamily households - $37,312. The population living below the poverty line was 22.8%, with under 18 years at 26.9%, 18 - 64, 24.1%, and over 65 at 9.8%.

Education - The percentage of people in the township with a bachelor's degree or higher was 50.3%. The population of school enrollment from Kindergarten to 12th Grade was 46.2%

Employment - About 68.1% of the township's population were employed. The average travel time to work was 20.2 min. The means of transportation as follows: Drive Alone – 69.1%, Carpool – 7.7%, Public Transportation – 1.1%, Walked – 3.0%, Bicycle – 0.6%, Taxi/Motorcycle – 3.4% and work from home, 15.2%

Health - The percentage of people without Health Care Coverage in the township 6.8%, and the disabled population was 11.4%

Families & Living Arrangements - There were 1,913 households, of which 20.1% had children under 18. The average family size was 3.15. The total households by type were married couples: 34.0%, male householders with no spouse present, 32.8%, and female householders with no spouse present, 28.8%.

Race & Ethnicity - There were 2,165 housing units. The race and ethnic makeup of the township was 59.9% White, 35.3.8% Black or African American, 0.2% American Indian Native American, 1.54% Asian, 1.0% from some other race, and 2.1% two or more races.

== Government ==
The Ohio Revised Code establishes the laws governing the township.The township is overseen by a board of trustees consisting of three members, elected during the general election in November of odd-numbered years for a four-year term that begins on January 1 of the following year. Two trustees are elected the year after the presidential election, while one trustee is elected the year prior to it.

An elected township fiscal officer serves a four-year term that begins on April 1 of the year following the presidential election. The general election for the fiscal officer takes place in November of the year before the presidential election.

The township's board of trustees has the authority to appoint a township administrator, a role that Columbia Township utilizes. The township administrator serves as the head of the township's administration, operating under the board’s direction and supervision. This position is not elected.

In the event of vacancies on the board of trustees, fiscal officer, or township administrator, the board of trustees may appoint a qualified individual to fill the vacancy for the unexpired term or until a successor is elected.

=== Joint Economic Development Zone (JEDZ) ===
On November 5, 2013, the residents of Columbia Township voted to establish a Joint Economic Development Zone (JEDZ) and to implement an earnings tax on individuals working in the Zone and on net profits from businesses in the Zone, in partnership with the Village of Fairfax.
