= Golf Manor, Ohio =

- Village
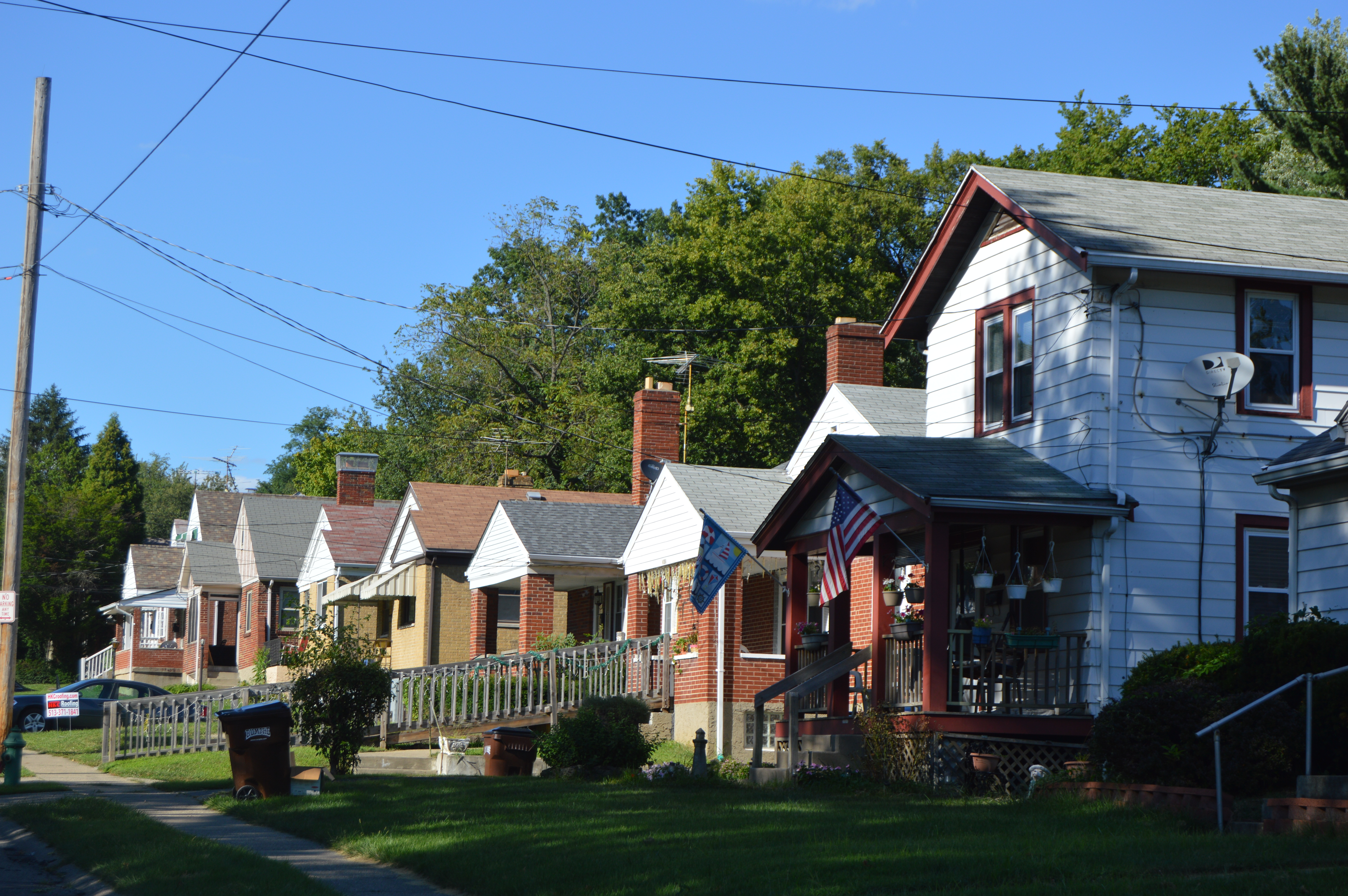
- Houses on Hammel Avenue

- Location in Hamilton County and the state of Ohio.
- Coordinates: 39°11′16″N 84°26′49″W
- Country: United States
- State: Ohio
- County: Hamilton

Government
  - Mayor: Stefan C. Densmore

Area
  - Total: 0.58 sq mi (1.50 km^{2})
  - Land: 0.58 sq mi (1.50 km^{2})
  - Water: 0 sq mi (0.00 km^{2})
- Elevation: 659 ft (201 m)

Population (2020)
  - Total: 3,814
  - Estimate (2023): 3,754
  - Density: 6,572.4/sq mi (2,537.62/km^{2})
- Time zone: UTC-5 (Eastern (EST))
  - Summer (DST): UTC-4 (EDT)
- ZIP code: 45237
- Area code: 513
- FIPS code: 39-30786
- GNIS feature ID: 1086211
- Website: www.golfmanoroh.gov

Golf Manor is a village in Hamilton County, Ohio, United States. It is almost completely surrounded by the Pleasant Ridge and Roselawn neighborhoods of Cincinnati. The population was 3,814 at the 2020 census.

== History ==
Golf Manor was laid out by property developers in the 1920s. The community was named for the fact there were three golf courses near the town site.

== Geography ==
According to the United States Census Bureau, the village has a total area of 0.57 square miles (1.48 km^{2}), all land.

== Demographics ==
Historical population
Census	Pop.	Note	%±
1950	3,603		—
1960	4,648		29.0%
1970	5,170		11.2%
1980	4,317		−16.5%
1990	4,154		−3.8%
2000	3,999		−3.7%
2010	3,611		−9.7%
2020	3,814		5.6%
2023 (est.)	3,754	▼	−1.6%
U.S. Decennial Census

=== Racial and ethnic composition ===
Golf Manor village, Ohio – Racial and ethnic composition Note: the US Census treats Hispanic/Latino as an ethnic category. This table excludes Latinos from the racial categories and assigns them to a separate category. Hispanics/Latinos may be of any race.
Race / Ethnicity (NH = Non-Hispanic)	Pop 2000	Pop 2010	Pop 2020	% 2000	% 2010	% 2020
White alone (NH)	1,359	865	1,098	33.98%	23.95%	28.79%
Black or African American alone (NH)	2,507	2,607	2,368	62.69%	72.20%	62.09%
Native American or Alaska Native alone (NH)	1	5	0	0.03%	0.14%	0.00%
Asian alone (NH)	28	9	30	0.70%	0.25%	0.79%
Native Hawaiian or Pacific Islander alone (NH)	0	0	0	0.00%	0.00%	0.00%
Other race alone (NH)	14	9	30	0.35%	0.25%	0.79%
Mixed race or Multiracial (NH)	66	73	158	1.65%	2.02%	4.14%
Hispanic or Latino (any race)	24	43	130	0.60%	1.19%	3.41%
Total	3,999	3,611	3,814	100.00%	100.00%	100.00%

=== 2020 census ===
As of the 2020 census, there were 3,814 people living in the village, with a population density of 6,575.86 people per square mile (2,537.62/km^{2}).

The median age was 37.5 years. 25.4% of residents were under the age of 18 and 16.0% were 65 years of age or older. For every 100 females, there were 85.2 males, and for every 100 females age 18 and over there were 78.1 males age 18 and over.

There were 1,692 households, of which 31.4% had children under the age of 18 living in them. Of all households, 25.5% were married-couple households, 20.7% were households with a male householder and no spouse or partner present, and 46.9% were households with a female householder and no spouse or partner present. About 38.6% of all households were made up of individuals, and 14.4% had someone living alone who was 65 years of age or older. The average household size was 2.01, and the average family size was 3.15.

There were 1,823 housing units, of which 7.2% were vacant. The homeowner vacancy rate was 1.0% and the rental vacancy rate was 4.5%. 100.0% of residents lived in urban areas, while 0.0% lived in rural areas.

=== Income and poverty ===
According to the U.S. Census American Community Survey, for the period 2016-2020 the estimated median annual income for a household in the village was $39,360, and the median income for a family was $49,144. About 17.8% of the population were living below the poverty line, including 9.1% of those under age 18 and 31.4% of those age 65 or over. About 65.4% of the population were employed, and 23.1% had a bachelor's degree or higher.

=== 2010 census ===
As of the census of 2010, there were 3,611 people, 1,614 households, and 897 families living in the village. The population density was 6,335.1 inhabitants per square mile (2,446.0/km^{2}). There were 1,837 housing units at an average density of 3,222.8 per square mile (1,244.3/km^{2}). The racial makeup of the village was 24.3% White, 72.6% African American, 0.1% Native American, 0.2% Asian, 0.4% from other races, and 2.3% from two or more races. Hispanic or Latino of any race were 1.2% of the population.

There were 1,614 households, of which 30.4% had children under the age of 18 living with them, 25.6% were married couples living together, 25.9% had a female householder with no husband present, 4.1% had a male householder with no wife present, and 44.4% were non-families. 39.3% of all households were made up of individuals, and 12.6% had someone living alone who was 65 years of age or older. The average household size was 2.24 and the average family size was 3.01.

The median age in the village was 38.1 years. 26.1% of residents were under the age of 18; 7.6% were between the ages of 18 and 24; 25.4% were from 25 to 44; 28.1% were from 45 to 64; and 12.7% were 65 years of age or older. The gender makeup of the village was 44.6% male and 55.4% female.

=== 2000 census ===
As of the census of 2000, there were 3,999 people, 1,751 households, and 1,055 families living in the village. The population density was 6,896.3 inhabitants per square mile (2,662.7/km^{2}). There were 1,840 housing units at an average density of 3,173.1 per square mile (1,225.1/km^{2}). The racial makeup of the village was 34.23% White, 62.89% African American, 0.05% Native American, 0.70% Asian, 0.38% from other races, and 1.75% from two or more races. Hispanic or Latino of any race were 0.60% of the population.

There were 1,751 households, out of which 29.4% had children under the age of 18 living with them, 34.6% were married couples living together, 21.2% had a female householder with no husband present, and 39.7% were non-families. 34.7% of all households were made up of individuals, and 11.5% had someone living alone who was 65 years of age or older. The average household size was 2.28 and the average family size was 2.95.

In the village, the population was spread out, with 25.6% under the age of 18, 6.9% from 18 to 24, 29.8% from 25 to 44, 23.3% from 45 to 64, and 14.4% who were 65 years of age or older. The median age was 38 years. For every 100 females there were 81.5 males. For every 100 females age 18 and over, there were 75.4 males.

The median income for a household in the village was $37,111, and the median income for a family was $47,328. Males had a median income of $34,444 versus $29,116 for females. The per capita income for the village was $19,044. About 9.2% of families and 10.7% of the population were below the poverty line, including 13.0% of those under age 18 and 14.5% of those age 65 or over.

== Religion ==
The village is home to the oldest Orthodox Jewish synagogue in the Cincinnati area, Golf Manor Synagogue.
