= History of the Jews in Cincinnati =

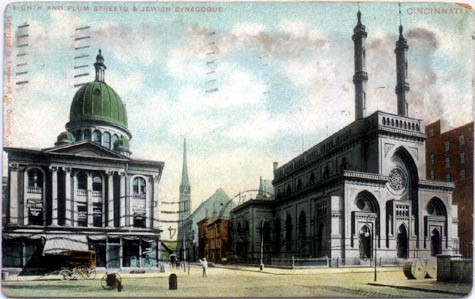
Postcard of St. Paul Episcopal Cathedral (destroyed 1937) and Plum Street Temple

The history of the Jews in Cincinnati occupies a prominent place in the development of Jewish secular and religious life in the United States. Cincinnati is not only the oldest Jewish community west of the Allegheny Mountains but has also been an institutional center of American Reform Judaism for more than a century. The Israelite, the oldest American Jewish newspaper still being published, began publication in Cincinnati in 1854.

== 19th century ==
=== Arrival of British Jews ===
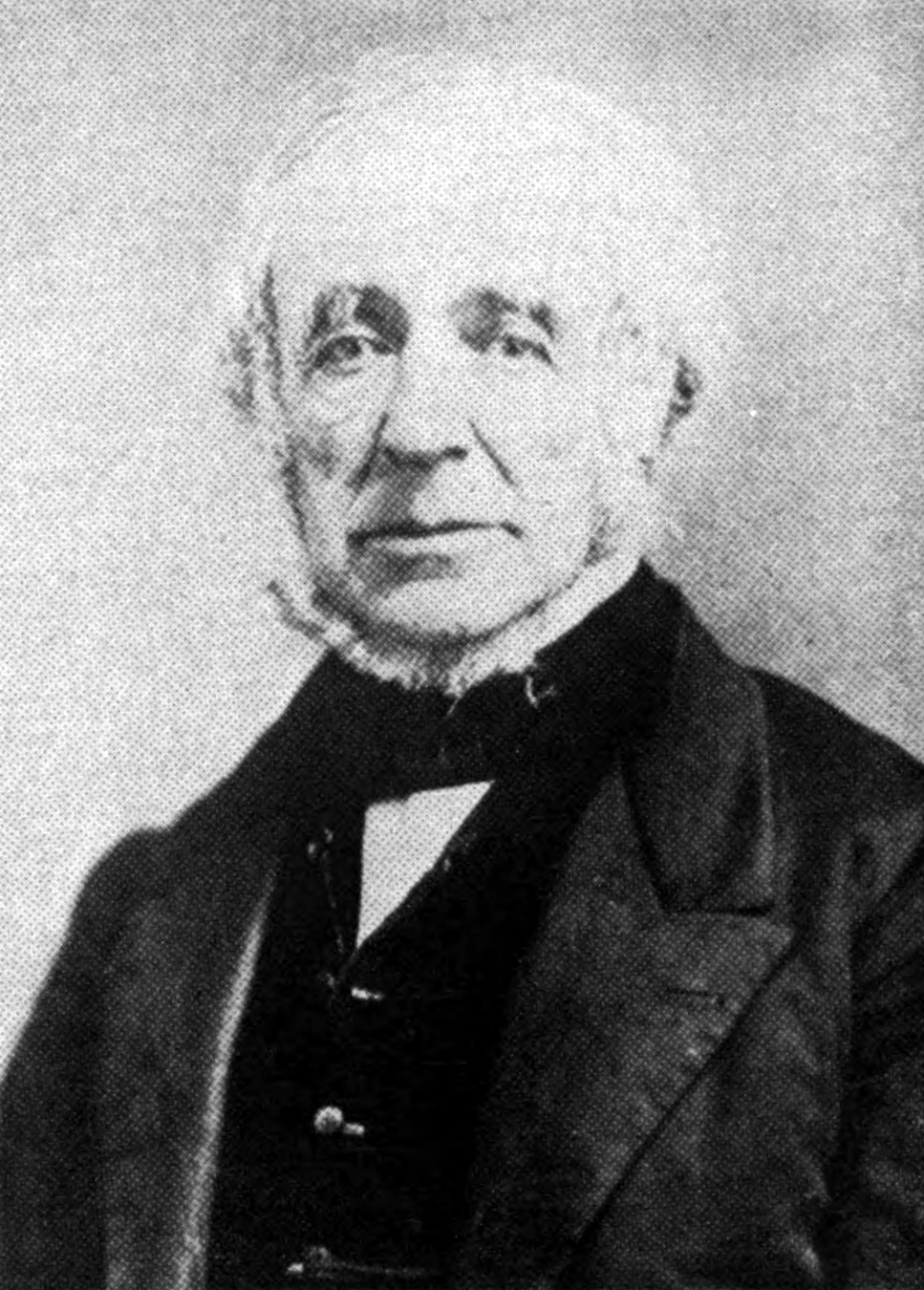
Joseph Jonas (1792–1869)

The first known Jew to settle in Cincinnati was Joseph Jonas, an English emigrant who arrived in the city via Philadelphia in 1817. Jonas, a young man, decided to leave his home in Exeter, England, with the avowed intention of settling in Cincinnati. Friends in Philadelphia originally endeavored to dissuade him from going to a place so isolated from all association with his coreligionists. However, Jonas reassured them that he would succeed. For the first two years, he was the only Jew in the Midwestern town.

In 1819, Jonas was joined by three others, Lewis Cohen of London, Barnet Levi of Liverpool, and Jonas Levy of Exeter. On the High Holidays in the autumn of 1819, these four men, together with David Israel Johnson of Brookville, Indiana (a frontier trading-station), conducted the first Jewish service west of the Appalachians. Similar services were held for the next three years. Newcomers continued to arrive, the early settlers being mostly Jews from England.

The first Jewish child born in Cincinnati, Frederick A. Johnson (June 2, 1821), was the son of the above-mentioned David Israel Johnson and his wife, Eliza. This couple, also English, had removed to Cincinnati from Brookville, where they had first settled. The first couple to be married were Morris Symonds and Rebekah Hyams, whose wedding was celebrated on September 15, 1824. The first death in the community was that of Benjamin Leib (or Lape) in 1821. This man, who had not been known as a Jew, when he felt death to be approaching, asked that three of the Jewish residents of the town be called. He disclosed to them that he was a Jew. He had taken a Gentile spouse who was Noachide, and had reared his children as Noahides, but he begged to be buried as a Jew. There was no Jewish burial-ground in the town. The few Jews living in the city at once proceeded to acquire a small plot of ground to be used as a cemetery and buried him there. This plot, which was afterward enlarged and is known as the Old Jewish Cemetery, was used as the cemetery of the Jewish community until the year 1849, after the cholera epidemic. At present this cemetery (oldest west of the Alleghenies) is situated in the heart of the city, on Chestnut Street near Central Avenue, in the Old West End.

=== Birth of Jewish institutions ===
There were not enough settlers to form a congregation until the year 1824, when the number of Jewish inhabitants of the town had reached about twenty. On January 4 of that year a preliminary meeting was held to consider the advisability of organizing a congregation. Two weeks later, on January 18, the Congregation Bene Israel was formally organized; those in attendance were Solomon Buckingham, David I. Johnson, Joseph Jonas, Samuel Jonas, Jonas Levy, Morris Moses, Phineas Moses, Simeon Moses, Solomon Moses, and Morris Symonds. On January 8, 1830, the Ohio General Assembly granted the congregation a charter whereby it was incorporated under the laws of the state.

For twelve years, the congregation worshiped in a room rented for the purpose, but during all this time the small congregation was seeking to secure a permanent home. Appeals were made to Jewish congregations in various parts of the country. Philadelphia, Charleston, and New Orleans lent their assistance. Contributions were even received from Portsmouth, England, from where a number of Cincinnatians had emigrated, and from Barbados in the West Indies. On June 11, 1835, the cornerstone of the first synagogue was laid, and on September 9, 1836, the synagogue was dedicated with appropriate ceremonies. The members of the congregation had conducted the services up to this time. The first official reader was Joseph Samuels. He served a very short time, and was succeeded by Henry Harris, who was followed in 1838 by Hart Judah.

The first benevolent association in Cincinnati was organized in 1838 with Phineas Moses as president: its object was to assist needy coreligionists. The first religious school was established in 1842, Mrs. Louisa Symonds becoming its first superintendent. This school was short-lived. In 1845, a Talmud Torah school was established, which gave way the following year to the Hebrew Institute, established by James K. Gutheim. This also flourished but a short time; when Gutheim departed for New Orleans, the institute closed.

During the 1830s, quite a number of German Jews arrived in the city. On September 19, 1841, the B'nai Yeshurun congregation was organized by the Germans, and was incorporated under the laws of the state February 28, 1842. The first reader was Simon Bamberger. In 1847, James K. Gutheim was elected lecturer and reader of the congregation. He served till 1848, and was succeeded by H. A. Henry and A. Rosenfeld.

=== Rabbi Isaac Wise ===
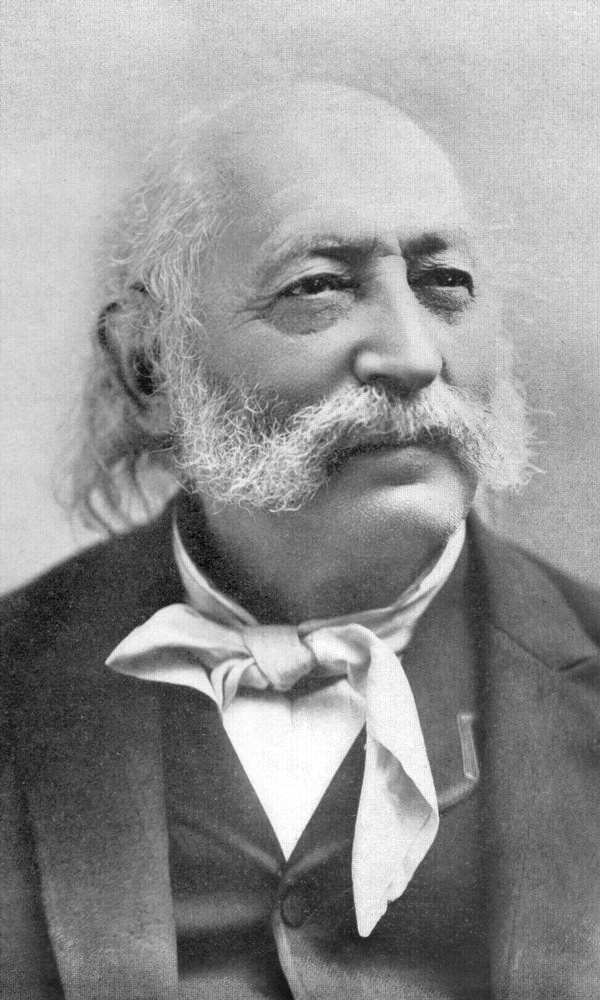
Isaac M. Wise, the rabbi of the Plum Street Temple

In April 1854, Isaac Mayer Wise became the first rabbi of the B'ne Yeshurun congregation. In that same year, Wise's brother-in-law, Edward Bloch, followed him to Cincinnati, collaborating on the production side of The Israelite and eventually founding what at the time was the largest Jewish publisher in the country, Bloch Publishing Company.

The efforts of these men, aided by Max Lilienthal, who was hired by B'ne Israel the following year, and Jacob Ezekiel, who moved to Cincinnati in 1868 to assist Wise with his college project, made Cincinnati the intellectual capital of American Judaism. The first association of American synagogues, the Union of American Hebrew Congregations, was born in Cincinnati in 1873. The first Jewish institute of higher education, the Hebrew Union College, opened in 1875, followed by the Hebrew Sabbath-School Union in 1886 and the Central Conference of American Rabbis in 1889. Manischevitz, the first to automate matzoh baking, opened in 1888.

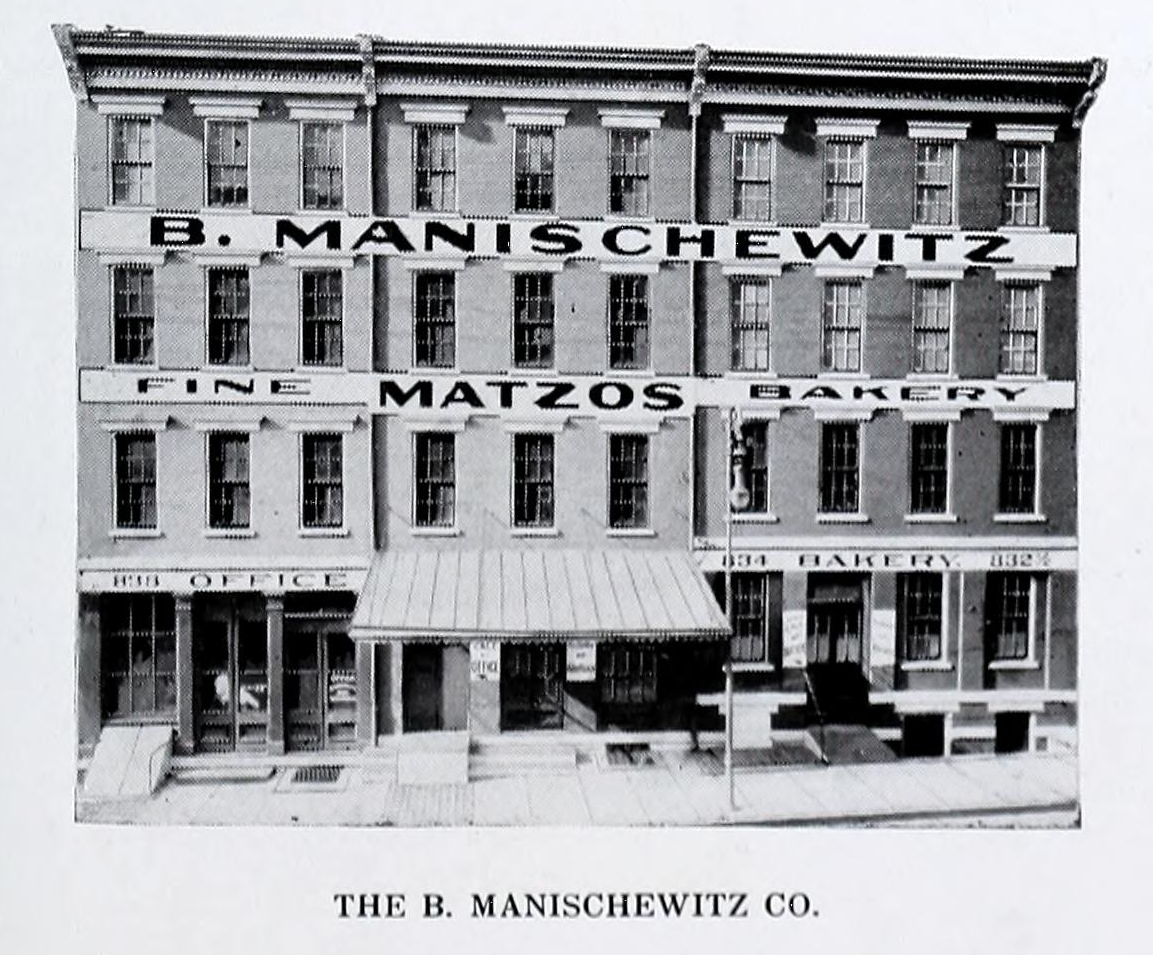
Early headquarters for the Manischewitz Bakery, in Cincinnati, 1926

The Israelite began publication in 1854. After The Occident gave up in 1861 trying to replace the weekly Asmonean (ceased in 1858) and returned to its monthly format, until 1875, when The Jewish Week appeared, The Israelite was the only Jewish weekly in the country. Like the Forverts later, it published fiction and essays as well as news. Its only intellectual competitor, the monthly Occident, ceased in 1869. With its supplement in German, Die Deborah, The Israelite was the only bilingual Jewish publication in the United States.

The importance of Cincinnati for American Judaism at the time is somewhat obscured by subsequent developments. What happened in Cincinnati is thought of now as the birth of Reform Judaism in America, but at the time it was not so viewed. This was American Judaism, full stop. These were the only Jewish institutions. Wise was creating a Union of American Hebrew Congregations, not the Union for Reform Judaism it later became. The first project of this "union" was the creation of the Hebrew Union College. It was no secret that there were more reform-minded rabbis and other more conservative rabbis, but they were all rabbis. American Judaism was not yet split into subgroupings (Reform, Conservative, etc.), nor was there a feeling that eventually it would be. To the contrary, Rabbi Wise wanted and worked for unity.

The deaths of Joseph Ezekiel in 1899 and Rabbi Wise in 1900 mark the end of the period. Bloch Publishing moved to New York City in 1901. In 1951, the UAHC (now called the Union for Reform Judaism) moved its headquarters to the demographic center of American Jewry in New York City. Under pressure from the great wave of Jewish immigrants from eastern Europe, where Jewish reform was almost unknown, Reform Judaism became much less audacious than it had been in Cincinnati in the 2nd half of the 19th century, when it was still reform and not Reform Judaism. And Jewish unity was gone, apparently for good.

== 20th century ==
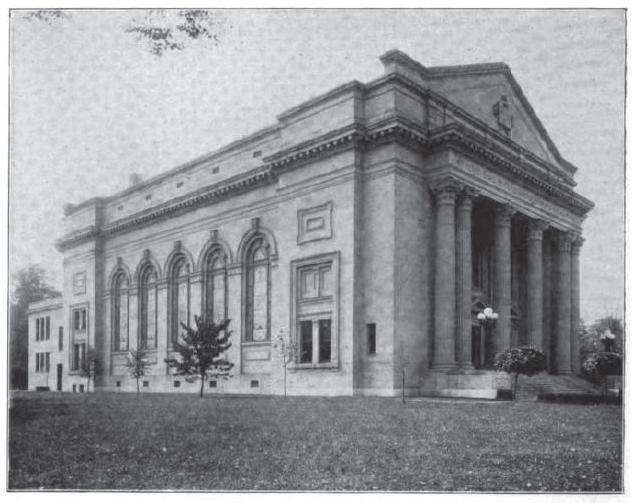
The former Temple K.K. Bene Israel designed by Cincinnati architect Rudolph Tietig

In 1900, the estimated Jewish population of the city stood around 15,000, in a total population of 325,902.

== 21st century ==
In 2008, the estimated Jewish population of the Cincinnati metropolitan area stood around 27,000. By 2019, the estimated Jewish population of the Cincinnati metropolitan area had grown to approximately 32,100.

== Plum Street Temple ==
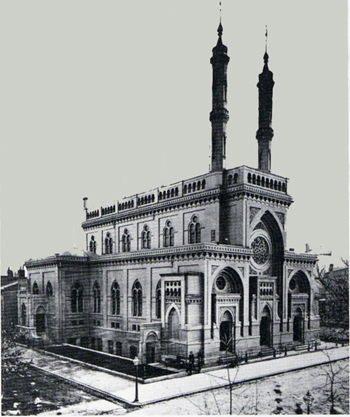
Early 20th Century photo of Plum Street Temple designed by Cincinnati architect James Keys Wilson

In 1866, the congregation built the architecturally notable Plum Street Temple, as the Isaac M. Wise Temple. Dr. Lilienthal died in office April 5, 1882. He was succeeded as rabbi of the Congregation B'ne Israel by Raphael Benjamin, who served till November 1888, when David Philipson, took charge of the congregation. Dr. Wise served as rabbi of the B'ne Yeshurun congregation till the day of his death, March 26, 1900, being succeeded by his associate, Louis Grossmann. Dr. Grossmann had been preceded as associate rabbi by Rabbi Charles S. Levi, who served from September 1889 to September 1898.

== Educational work ==
The other congregations of the city, which continued to adhere to Orthodoxy, were the Adath Israel, organized in 1847; the Ahabath Achim, organized in 1848; and the Sherith Israel, organized in 1855. There were also a number of smaller congregations. Each of these congregations conducted its own religious school, and there were also two free religious schools; one holding its sessions in the schoolrooms of the Mound Street Temple (B'ne Israel), and the other, conducted under the auspices of the local branch of the Council of Jewish Women, meeting at the Jewish Settlement. One of these congregations enjoys the distinction of having petitioned overseas halakhic authority Rabbi Naftali Zvi Yehuda Berlin regarding the appropriate manner in which to inaugurate a Torah scroll in the synagogue. [R. Berlin's response is published in his She'elot Uteshuvot Meshiv Davar, I, no. 16, and possesses practical halakhic ramifications until today, as explained by Rabbi J. David Bleich in the latter's Contemporary Halakhic Problems V, p. 386.] A large Talmud Torah school was conducted by the Talmud Torah Association on Barr Street. Night classes for various English and industrial branches of study were a feature of the work of the Jewish Settlement. The Jewish Kitchen Garden Association conducted a large school for girls in the building of the United Jewish Charities every Sunday morning, where instruction is given in dressmaking, millinery, housekeeping, cooking, stenography, typewriting, and allied subjects. An industrial school for girls was conducted during the summer months in the vestry-rooms of the Plum street temple (B'ne Yeshurun), and one for boys during the school year in the Ohio Mechanics Institute building. There was a training-school for nurses in connection with the Jewish Hospital.

The Jewish charities of Cincinnati were exceptionally well organized. All the relief and educational agencies joined their forces in April 1896, and formed the United Jewish Charities. This body comprised the following federated societies: Hebrew General Relief Association, Jewish Ladies’ Sewing Society, Jewish Foster Home, Jewish Kitchen Garden Association, Boys’ Industrial School, Girls’ Industrial School, and Society for the Relief of Jewish Sick Poor. The United Charities also granted an annual subvention to the Denver Hospital for Consumptives and to the local Jewish Settlement Association. The seat of the National Jewish Charities is also in Cincinnati, where the national organization was called into being in May 1899. Besides the United Jewish Charities, Cincinnati supported the Jewish Hospital and the Home for the Jewish Aged and Infirm, and was one of the largest contributors to the Jewish Orphan Asylum at Cleveland.

The Jews of Cincinnati participated actively in civic life and filled many local positions of trust, as well as state, judicial, and governmental offices. Henry Mack, Charles Fleischmann, James Brown (Ohio politician), and Alfred M. Cohen were elected members of the State Senate, and Joseph Jonas, Jacob Wolf, Daniel Wolf, and Harry M. Hoffheimer served in the State House of Representatives. Jacob Shroder was judge of the court of common pleas for a number of years, and Frederick S. Spiegel held the same position as of 1902. Julius Fleischmann was the mayor of the city. Nathaniel Newburgh was appointed appraiser of merchandise by President Cleveland during his first administration, and Bernhard Bettmann was collector of internal revenue since 1897. Lewis S. Rosenstiel, a grandson of Frederick A. Johnson—the first Jew born in the city, was the founder and chairman of Schenley Industries and was the nation's largest distiller for half of the twentieth-century.

== Newspapers ==
The second Jewish newspaper in the United States was the English-language The Israelite, established in Cincinnati in 1854. (The first was the Asmonean.) It was founded by Rabbi Wise and (after its initial issues, which were published by Charles F. Schmidt), it began to be published by Edward Bloch with the issue of July 27, 1855. Rabbi Wise also founded (and Bloch published) the German-language Die Deborah in 1855. The Israelite was renamed The American Israelite in 1874. Rabbi Wise's son Leo Wise took over as its publisher from 1883–1884, and then he did so again, permanently, in 1888. The American Israelite still exists and is the longest-running Jewish newspaper in the United States. Another newspaper, The Sabbath Visitor, established 1874, was discontinued in 1892.

The "Every Friday" newspaper was an Anglo-Jewish newspaper of Jewish affairs, founded and published by Mr. Samuel M. Schmidt in the Cincinnati area between 1927 through 1965. It was considered by most to be a newspaper for the Orthodox Jews in Cincinnati and surrounding areas.

== Businesses ==
The B. Manischewitz Company was founded by Rabbi Dov Behr Manischewitz in Cincinnati in 1888. Their original product, the square matzah, revolutionized matzoh making. Previously matzot were hand rolled and trimmed.

In the late 1800s Jewish Russian immigrant David Kadetz settled in Cincinnati, and offered his flair for cooking at the renowned St. Nicolas Hotel. A Cincinnati culinary institution, Kadetz' Kosher, opened in 1901 as the first kosher restaurant west of the Alleghenies.

== Notable Cincinnati Jews ==
- Theda Bara - American silent film and stage actress
- Michael L. Chyet - linguist
- Michael Dine - theoretical physicist
- Nelson Glueck - rabbi and pioneering biblical archaeologist
- Davy Miller, Chicagoan gangster, born in Cincinnati.
- Adolph Ochs - newspaper publisher, former New York Times owner
- Sarah Jessica Parker - Emmy award-winning American actress
- Daniel J. Ransohoff - community planner, historian, photographer
- Jerry Rubin - American social activist, anti-war leader, and counterculture icon
- Albert Sabin - Medical researcher who developed oral polio vaccine
- Eliezer Silver - President of the Union of Orthodox Rabbis of the U.S. and Canada
- Steven Spielberg - Academy Award-winning film director
- Jerry Springer - 56th Mayor of Cincinnati (1977–78)
- Joseph Strauss - Chief structural engineer of the Golden Gate Bridge
- Lillian D. Wald - nurse, humanitarian, author, founder of Henry Street Settlement
- Isaac Mayer Wise - Rabbi, editor, author, and founder of Reform Judaism
- Kevin Youkilis - 3x All-Star, 2x World Series Champion baseball player
