= Losantiville Country Club =

Private club in Cincinnati, Ohio

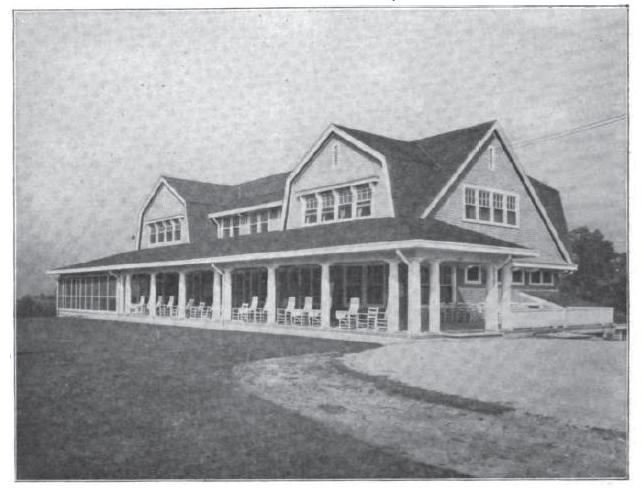
- Losantiville Country Club building designed by Cincinnati architect Rudolph Tietig
- Interactive map of Losantiville Country Club
- 39°11′01″N 84°25′53″W

Club information
- Location: Cincinnati, Ohio
- Established: 1902
- Type: Private
- Total holes: 18
- Tournaments: Ohio Open; Ohio Amateur
- Greens: Bent grass
- Fairways: Bent grass
- Website: www.losantivillecc.com
- Designed by: Tom Bendelow
- Par: 70
- Length: 6501
- Course rating: 72.2
- Slope rating: 133

Losantiville Country Club (LCC) is a private Country Club founded in 1902 located in Cincinnati, Ohio, which operates golf, tennis and platform tennis, and swimming facilities, and provides food, beverages and services.

LCC's facilities include an 18-hole Championship Golf Course, a swimming complex, Har-Tru clay tennis courts, platform tennis courts and a full-service Clubhouse.

== History ==
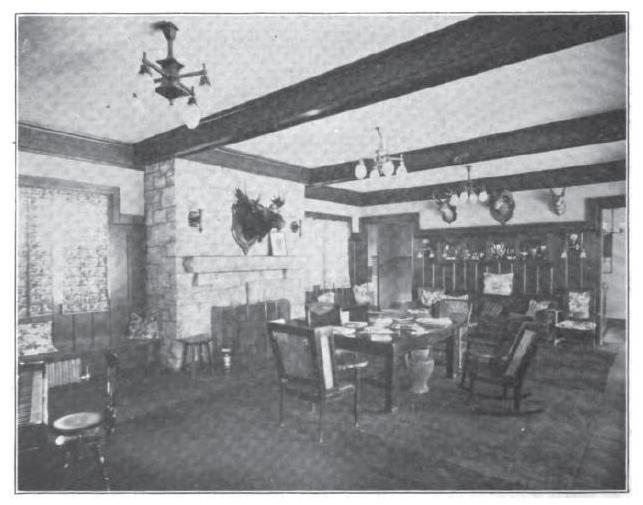
Club room photograph ca. 1912

The original lease for the Losantiville Club, named after the original name of Cincinnati, was signed in February, 1902 upon the site of the old Oakley race track. Part of the track's grandstand was converted into our original Clubhouse with showers and a locker room. By 1905, the Membership had grown to 100, creating strong sentiment for upgraded facilities and amenities.

Founded as a Jewish country club, in response to the unavailability of membership for Jews at established clubs of the time, LCC has not limited its memberships to Jews for decades; today's membership, although still reflecting the club's tradition and history, is a cross-section of Cincinnati demographics and is skewing younger on almost a weekly basis, especially as some of the neighboring communities like Pleasant Ridge continue to gentrify.

The leading golf architect of the time was Tom Bendelow, the “Johnny Appleseed of American Golf”. Mr. Bendelow was engaged to design the course in Pleasant Ridge and created a course that both fit within the boundaries of the blueprint and promised years of enjoyment. The decision was made to move forward with acquisition of the present site.

The club was then reorganized as the Losantiville Country Club and incorporated on March 23, 1906, with the official dedication of the new Clubhouse taking place in May, 1907. Over the intervening years there have been many changes and improvements to the club, including the addition of a pool in 1935, most recently renovated in 1995. The golf course has been continuously improved. The number of tennis courts have increased and benefited from the installation of lights for night play. The Clubhouse has been remodeled throughout the years, always with the goal of improved Member experience as the goal.

In the spring of 2002, Losantiville CC and Crest Hills Country Club, established in 1939 and located near LCC in Amberly Village, voted to merge and become one. The decision was driven by the prescience of the leaders of these two Clubs as they adapted to demographic changes affecting golf in general and their mutual desire to provide the best possible current experience and most advantageous future for their respective Members. Emerging as a new entity, and uniting the history, amenities and communities of the two neighbors, this union was initially, and appropriately, christened The Ridge Club.

Recognizing that the Losantiville golf course's unique character and tradition, resulting from the pairing of Mr. Bendelow's naturalistic design with the benefits realized from over a century of evolution and continuous improvements, was enjoyable and challenging for all skill levels of golfers, the combined membership again voted and chose to preserve the Losantiville course and facilities as the site of the new Ridge Club. These 18 holes of golf were considered the “gem” of The Ridge Club.

In September 2009, the Clubhouse of The Ridge Club was totally remodeled, re-opening in May, 2010. At this time, the then current Membership, in recognition of the importance of preserving the rich history & tradition of the club, voted overwhelmingly to change the name from the “Ridge Club” back to the familiar and resonant “Losantiville Country Club”.

In early 2016, LCC invested in new practice facilities.

== Score card ==
Losantiville Country Club
| Tee | Rating/Slope | 1 | 2 | 3 | 4 | 5 | 6 | 7 | 8 | 9 | Out | 10 | 11 | 12 | 13 | 14 | 15 | 16 | 17 | 18 | In | Total |
| Black | 72.2/133 | 473 | 178 | 425 | 356 | 321 | 438 | 199 | 423 | 441 | 3254 | 334 | 451 | 213 | 397 | 306 | 411 | 556 | 167 | 412 | 3247 | 6501 |
| Orange | 70.6/129 | 454 | 157 | 392 | 347 | 309 | 429 | 179 | 400 | 414 | 3081 | 323 | 416 | 189 | 383 | 297 | 400 | 541 | 155 | 376 | 3080 | 6161 |
| Silver | M:68.2/124 W:76.4/133 | 431 | 143 | 375 | 331 | 266 | 386 | 163 | 390 | 377 | 2862 | 312 | 398 | 146 | 341 | 270 | 355 | 500 | 145 | 346 | 2813 | 5675 |
| Teal | M:65.4/119 W:70.7/122 | 406 | 130 | 312 | 210 | 254 | 339 | 152 | 332 | 321 | 2456 | 272 | 380 | 131 | 333 | 265 | 347 | 464 | 133 | 296 | 2621 | 5077 |
| Gold | M:63.6/116 W:67.8/115 | 355 | 108 | 277 | 200 | 232 | 318 | 111 | 322 | 296 | 2219 | 262 | 320 | 113 | 281 | 212 | 272 | 397 | 125 | 258 | 2240 | 4459 |
| Par | | 5 | 3 | 4 | 4 | 4 | 4 | 3 | 4 | 4 | 35 | 4 | 4 | 3 | 4 | 4 | 4 | 5 | 3 | 4 | 35 | 70 |
| SI | Men's | 15 | 9 | 7 | 11 | 13 | 5 | 17 | 3 | 1 | | 12 | 2 | 16 | 10 | 14 | 4 | 8 | 18 | 6 |
| SI | Women's | 9 | 17 | 5 | 13 | 7 | 3 | 15 | 11 | 1 | | 10 | 12 | 18 | 8 | 14 | 2 | 6 | 16 | 4 |

== See also ==
- History of Jews in Cincinnati
