= Medbury (disambiguation) =

Medbury is a rural locality in the Canterbury region of New Zealand's South Island.

Medbury may also refer to:

- Medbury School, Christchurch, New Zealand
- John P. Medbury (died 1942), American humorist
- James Medbury MacKaye (1872-1935), American engineer and philosopher

== See also ==
- Medbury's–Grove Lawn Subdivisions Historic District, Highland Park, Michigan
