= Old Jewish Cemetery, Cincinnati =

Jewish cemetery in Hamilton County, Ohio

Coordinates: 39°06′26″N 84°31′17″W

The Old Jewish Cemetery (also known as the Chestnut Street Cemetery and Bene Israel Burying Ground) in Cincinnati, Ohio, is the oldest Jewish cemetery west of the Allegheny Mountains. Opened in 1821, it is located just northwest of Downtown Cincinnati in the Betts-Longworth Historic District. It is situated just west of Central Avenue on the north side of Chestnut Street, in the historic West End. The cemetery is sited on a tiny plot enclosed by high walls and a locked gate.

== History ==
In 1821, when Benjamin Lieb was dying, he begged to be buried as a Jew. Morris Moses and Joseph Jonas, two of Cincinnati's six Jews, purchased the lot for Cincinnati's first Jewish cemetery from Nicholas Longworth for $75.00, and then buried Lieb there.

The cemetery has 85 graves and has been closed since 1849 after the cholera epidemic filled the cemetery.

This cemetery is now part of Jewish Cemeteries of Greater Cincinnati (JCGC), a non-profit organization that resulted in the merger of almost all of the 26 Jewish cemeteries in the area. JCGC is governed by a board which began as representatives of the former cemetery owners, but is morphing into a pure community-based board, on the recognition by its founders that the care of the graves of ancestors should be a function of the entire Jewish community. This merger solved the problem of caring for cemeteries created by synagogues and other organizations that no longer exist.

== See also ==
- Jewish history in Cincinnati
