= Betts House =

Betts House may refer to:

- Betts House (Cincinnati, Ohio), the oldest brick house in Ohio
- Betts House (Yale University), a mansion owned by Yale University in New Haven, Connecticut.
