= Doctors' Building (Cincinnati, Ohio) =

- U.S. National Register of Historic Places
- Cincinnati Local Historic Landmark
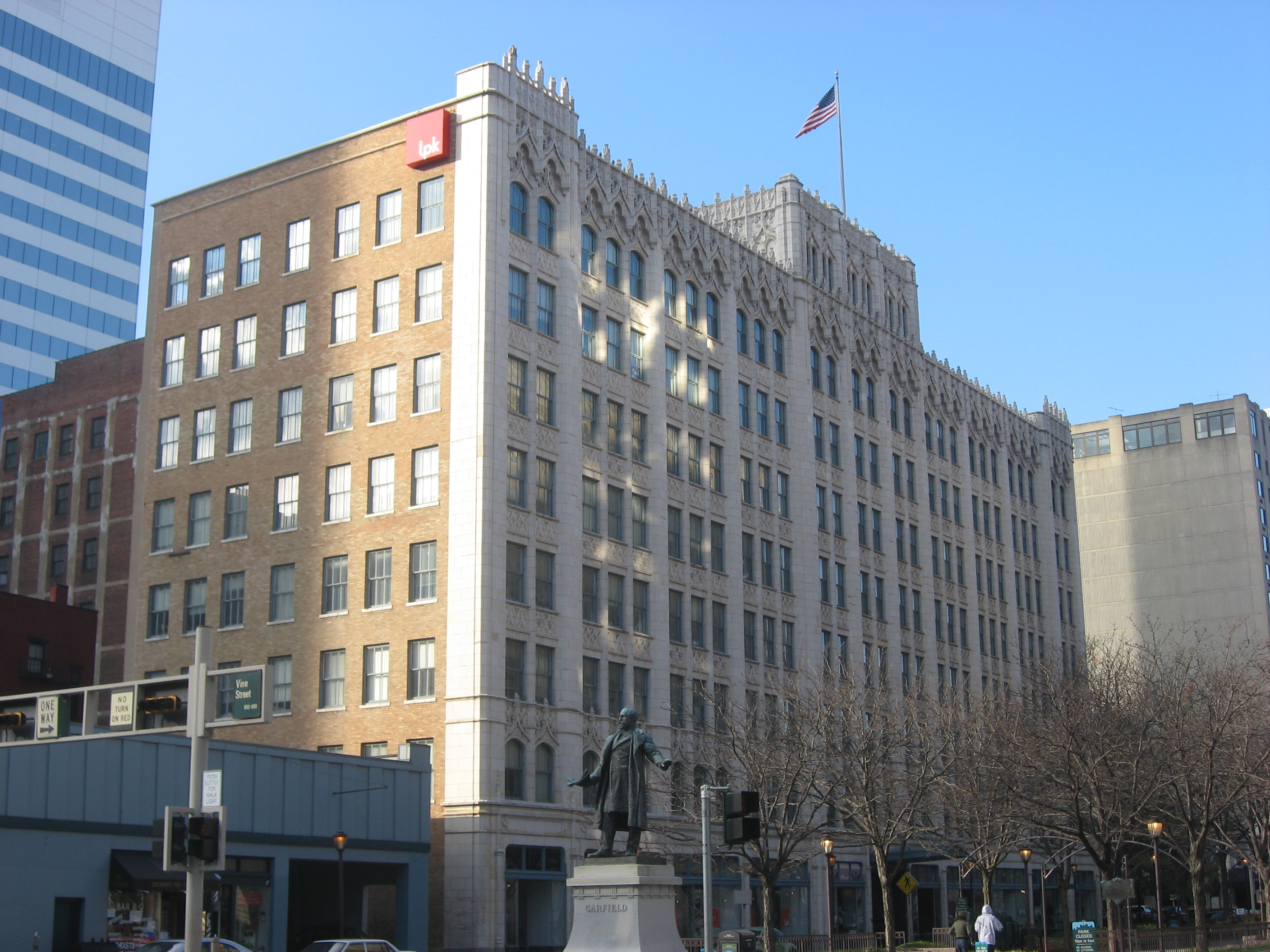
- Front and side of the Doctors' Building

- Location within Ohio
- Location: 19 Garfield Pl., Cincinnati, Ohio
- Coordinates: 39°6′15″N 84°30′53″W
- Area: less than one acre
- Built: 1923
- Architect: Tietig & Lee
- Architectural style: Late Gothic Revival
- NRHP reference No.: 86003317
- Added to NRHP: December 4, 1986

The Doctors' Building is a historic commercial structure in Cincinnati, Ohio, United States. Located on Garfield Place in the city's downtown, it is one of Cincinnati's few Late Gothic Revival commercial buildings.

== History ==
=== Commercial use ===
The Doctors' Building was designed by the firm of Tietig and Lee, one of Cincinnati's leading architectural firms in the early twentieth century. Completed in 1923, it was one of the firm's most prominent commissions; it was Cincinnati's only large building erected for the sole purpose of providing space for doctors' offices, and its location on the southern side of a park ensures that it can be seen from a distance. Terracotta tiles cover the eight-story facade, which is structured primarily of brick, although reinforced concrete was also employed in construction. Some additional elements are constructed of metal or marble. The building is topped with a mostly flat roof with a small penthouse.

By 1984, the city of Cincinnati was planning a $100 million residential redevelopment of Garfield Place. The plan called for the Doctors' Building to be converted into a 120-unit residential structure by 1987 and for two new apartment high-rises to be built on either side of the building by 1991. The city proposed demolishing a portion of the Doctors' Building to construct a parking garage for the new high-rises. Ameritas Inc. of Atlanta purchased the Doctors' Building for $3 million in July 1986. As Ameritas had suggested renovating the building for office use prior to the sale, the city viewed the acquisition as a threat to its redevelopment plans. The month of the sale, city officials met with Ameritas to discuss the future of the building, but were unable to come to an agreement.

In 1986, the Doctors' Building was listed on the National Register of Historic Places. It qualified for the Register both because of its place in local history and because of its well-preserved historic architecture. Key to these two statuses was its place as the area's only large building constructed for physicians and as one of the most important buildings designed by Tietig and Lee.

In 1987, Ameritas head C. John McDonald resigned as manager of three other historic buildings in Cincinnati, stating that his involvement with the properties was delaying the renovation of the Doctors' Building. By April of that year, renovation was scheduled to begin in June and finish within eight months. McDonald also agreed to the city's request to demolish part of the building to make space for a parking garage. In May 1988, McDonald sold the building to Montgomery-based developer 474 Group for about $3 million. The 474 Group subsequently announced plans for a $6 million renovation of the structure. The renovated building would be named "Presidential Plaza", referencing the statues of U.S. Presidents William Henry Harrison and James A. Garfield in adjacent Piatt Park. The 474 Group suggested that the building would provide office space for residents of the planned housing structures, but the city's residential development plans had stalled. Star Bank loaned the 474 Group $6.25 million for the project in 1988 and an additional $750,000 in February 1989. The 474 Group stated that the project's original developers, Garfield Building Investors, Ltd., had underestimated renovation costs. In July 1989, the city government considered granting the project $1.1 million to cover the gap in funds. By that time, the city and federal governments had already invested $1.8 million in the renovation.

In 1990, four companies filed liens against Presidential Plaza for unpaid renovation work. Star Bank filed a foreclosure suit against the 474 Group in December 1990, stating that the 474 Group had failed to pay the balance and interest on their mortgage by October 1. A Star Bank vice president stated that the bank did not believe that the debt could be accounted for by selling the building. In June 1991, ad firm Wolf Blumberg Krody and design firm Libby, Perszyk, Kathman (LPK) were planning to purchase a majority interest in the property, with each acquiring a roughly 35% stake. The 474 Group would retain the remaining 30% interest. An LPK partner stated that the plan was approved by Star Bank. Wolf Blumberg Krody already occupied space in the building at the time, while LPK planned to move to the building in September. Also in June, the 474 Group reached a preliminary agreement with Star Bank to halt the foreclosure suit. By February 1992, Presidential Plaza had entered foreclosure with an outstanding debt of almost $9 million and a valuation of $5.1 million. That month, Star Bank purchased the building at a sheriff's auction for $6.95 million. Six contractors who had filed liens against the building remained unpaid as a result of the sale. By July 1993, the building was jointly owned by Wolf Blumberg Krody, LPK, and Omega Management.

=== Residential conversion ===
By 2024, LPK occupied nearly 53,000 square feet of the 99,552 square foot building. On January 11 of that year, LPK sold the building to Villa Hills-based developer Ashley Builders Group for $3.7 million. Cushman & Wakefield facilitated the sale. Ashley subsequently announced plans to convert the structure into a mixed-use building, featuring 52 apartment units in addition to office space. The first and second floors would continue to be available for commercial use, with the building's existing café slated to remain in place. The conversion was initially projected to cost $5.4 million. The Cincinnati City Council approved a 12-year property tax abatement for the conversion. Construction began on December 1, 2024. By May 2025, the project was projected to cost $12.9 million. Ashley planned to finish the conversion by March 2026, contingent upon the receipt of $1.3 million in historic tax credits. In its application for the credits, Ashley stated that the building was over 75% vacant.

The converted building reopened under the name 19 on the Park in mid-2026. It featured the planned 52 apartments as well as a guest suite that residents could rent to visitors. Amenities included a fitness center, a sauna, a club room, and a pet spa. The building's non-residential components included retail and commercial space on the ground floor, doctors' offices and a Regus-operated coworking space on the second floor, and offices on the full fifth floor. The conversion ultimately cost about $11 million.
