= Betts House (Cincinnati, Ohio) =

Coordinates: 39.1078°N 84.5221°W

The Betts House
- Established: 1996
- Location: 416 Clark Street Cincinnati, OH 45203
- Type: House Museum
- Accreditation: American Association for State and Local History
- Founder: Martha Tuttle
- Owner: National Society of the Colonial Dames of American in the State of Ohio
- Website: https://bettshousecincinnati.org/

The Betts House, built in 1804, is the oldest surviving building in Cincinnati, and the oldest brick home in Ohio. This survivor of Cincinnati's period of settlement offers exhibits and programs that focus on Cincinnati history, historic preservation, and the built environment. In addition to being a house museum, the Betts House is also the headquarters of The National Society of the Colonial Dames of America in the State of Ohio.

== History of the Betts House ==
=== Betts Family Ownership ===
The Betts House, constructed in 1804, is the oldest brick home in Ohio, and the oldest remaining residential structure in downtown Cincinnati. Originally situated on 111 acres (45 ha), the home was once at the heart of a farm and brick yard. Over time, as the city expanded, the country landscape surrounding the home transitioned to an urban environment. Today, the Betts House is a central structure in the Betts-Longworth Historic District in Cincinnati's West End neighborhood.

Exterior view of the Betts House located on 416 Clark Street Cincinnati, OH

In 1795, the home's original owners, William and Phebe Betts, left their home in Rahway, New Jersey to pursue opportunities in the west. The first leg of their journey ended in Brownsville, Pennsylvania, where the Bettses lived for a number of years. In 1800, the family decided to resume their push westward on a flatboat, travelling down the Ohio River. Upon arriving in the region, the Betts family attempted to obtain a plot of land in Lebanon; however, the deed proved to be faulty. They then struck out for Cincinnati. There, William Betts obtained a 111-acre plot of land as repayment for a debt owed to him by a local tavern keeper. Construction quickly commenced on a two-room Federal period farmhouse that was completed in 1804.

Over the following decades, four generations of Betts family members called the Betts House home, and raised over two dozen children within its walls. To accommodate the growing family, a number of changes had to be made to the original structure. Between 1804 and 1864, the house more than doubled in size. During this period of expansion, the city of Cincinnati was also growing, and the house's surroundings became an urban neighborhood.

In 1833, the original 111-acre plot was subdivided when William's youngest daughter Eliza turned 21 (as stipulated by his will in 1815). By 1839, the neighborhood had been incorporated by the city of Cincinnati. Expansion continued until nearly every plot of land in the West End was developed, and the population increased to 30,000 people per square mile. By the 1870s, the neighborhood had become dense, while the air was polluted due to its close proximity to the meat packing industry at Mill Creek. During the following decades, many of the residents, including the last of the Betts descendants, moved to hilltop suburbs, such as College Hill.

=== Decline and Decay ===
Interior view of the Betts House located on 416 Clark Street Cincinnati, OH

The once densely populated West End suffered immensely from depopulation; however, it was not long before African Americans began to migrate to the neighborhood. By the beginning of the 20th-century, the area had become the cultural center for African Americans in Cincinnati, and was a major source of nightlife entertainment. The Cotton Club, a jazz establishment named after the famed Cotton Club in Harlem, called the neighborhood home.

Unfortunately, that era did not last for long. By the 1950s, the city of Cincinnati was struggling as residents once again left to nearby suburbs. In an effort to revitalize the downtown area, the City Council devised a plan centered on highway construction. The Kenyon-Barr neighborhood, home to around 25,000 low-income people, was selected for the construction of I-75. Between the late 1950s and early 1960s, almost 1,000 structures were demolished in the name of “urban renewal” leaving many of the neighborhood's African American residents homeless.

In the decades that followed, the West End fell into a state of decay. Many of its older homes, including the Betts House, lay vacant for much of the 1970s and 1980s when urban renewal plans for Queensgate failed.

=== Martha Tuttle ===
In 1988, Martha Tuttle, a descendant of William Betts, created a coalition of concerned citizens in an effort to save the house. Two years later, in 1990, they were able to secure the home, and undertook a costly renovation to restore the property to livable condition. For several years following the renovation, the Betts House served as a small apartment complex.

The National Society of Colonial Dames of America in the State of Ohio (NSCDA-OH) became the sole owners of the property in 1994. In 1996, the Betts House was opened to the public as a historic house museum, with exhibits and programs focused on the built environment and early Cincinnati history.

== Sources ==
Cincinnati, a Guide to the Queen City and Its Neighbors, American Guide Series, The Weisen-Hart Press, May 1943, page 228.
