= Allen Temple AME Church (Cincinnati, Ohio) =

Coordinates: 39.185633°N 84.463642°W

- Allen Temple AME Church
- Location: Cincinnati, Ohio, US
- Denomination: African Methodist Episcopal Church
- Website: www.allentemple.org

History
- Founded: 1824
- Founder: Rev. James King

Architecture
- Years built: 2004

Specifications
- Capacity: 1235

Administration
- District: Third Episcopal District

Clergy
- Pastor(s): Dr. Alphonse Allen, Jr.
- Allen Temple
- Formerly listed on the U.S. National Register of Historic Places
- Location within Ohio Location within the United States
- Location: 538 Broadway, Cincinnati, Ohio
- Area: less than one acre
- Built: 1852
- NRHP reference No.: 75001414

Significant dates
- Added to NRHP: July 7, 1975
- Removed from NRHP: January 1, 1999

The Allen Temple AME Church in Cincinnati, Ohio, US, is the mother church of the Third Episcopal District of the African Methodist Episcopal Church. Founded in 1824, it is the oldest operating black church in Cincinnati and the largest church of the Third Episcopal District of the AME Church.

== History ==
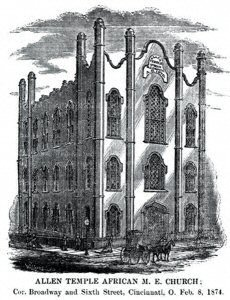
1874 engraving of Allen Temple AME Church

Named after Richard Allen, founder of the AME Church, the church was founded in 1823 as a congregation of the Methodist Episcopal Church because of the prejudicial treatment blacks received in the predominantly white churches.

The first pastor chosen by the black congregation was Rev. James King, at the time a slave living in Lexington, Kentucky, whose owner allowed him to hire his time. In 1824, following the founding of the AME denomination, Rev. King and Rev. Philip Brodie led the congregation to join with the AME. The congregation occupied at least four structures, each known by its own name, prior to 1870, the last of which was known as "Allen Chapel" and constructed around 1850. During this period the church was a waystation on the Underground Railroad. In 1862, the church helped launch the second AME church in Cincinnati, the Brown Chapel AME Church.

Because of growth and vandalism, in 1870 the congregation purchased the structure previously housing the Rockdale Temple synagogue for $40,000, (~$872,904 in 2024) reflecting its position as one of the early black churches with a predominantly middle class congregation. At this time the church took the name "Allen Temple". Fiscal pressures from the mortgage and 1974 fire damage led to the formation of charity groups. After paying off the debts of the congregation, these groups turned to social and welfare work.

Isaac Nelson Ross, later the 41st bishop of the African Methodist Episcopal, served as pastor of Allen Temple for 5 years between 1900 and 1907.

In 1975, the Broadway church building was listed on the National Register of Historic Places, qualifying as significant statewide because of its well-preserved historic architecture and because of its place in Ohio's history. Since that time, the building has been destroyed, and it was removed from the Register in 1999.

== Modern times ==
On May 13, 1996, accomplished founder and CEO of Thompson, Hall and Jordan Funeral homes, Rev. Donald Harold Jordan Sr., was appointed pastor of Allen Temple by Bishop Henry A. Belin after 17 years at Quinn Chapel AME Church also in Cincinnati. Jordan came after the Rev. Taylor Thompson had pastored Allen Temple, who, coincidentally, was sent to Quinn Chapel. Jordan originally retired from ministry in 1996 after it was revealed that he had prostate cancer, but he felt that his work was not yet done and he was appointed to Allen Temple, assuming that it would be what he called "lesser work".

At the time of Jordan's appointment, Allen Temple was located on 7181 Reading Road (where they had been since 1977). Under his leadership, the church acquired hundreds of new members and bought the Swifton Commons Shopping Mall which in 2003 was named Jordan Crossing Mall (sold in 2013 for redevelopment). Allen Temple began having their services in the Worship Center located in the front of the mall in 1999 where they acquired even more new members and began construction on a brand new sanctuary that would seat more than 1,000 people. The new church was completed in May 2004 and on May 16 and 23, 2004, it was dedicated by Bishop Paul A. Bowers of the Pentecostal Assemblies of the World and Bishop Robert V. Webster of the AME Church, respectively.

In August 2004, Reverend Jordan decided once again to retire. Prior to this time, in May 2004, he became a candidate for bishop in the AME Church. However, due to his age (72 years old at the time), he decided to withdraw his candidacy. At the South Ohio Annual Conference in 2004, the jurisdictional bishop met with Jordan and asked him to stay at Allen one more year, which he did, and on June 30, 2005, Jordan formally retired after 28 years in ministry and almost ten years at Allen Temple.

Jurisdictional Bishop Robert V. Webster served as Allen's interim pastor for four months (July to November 2005). In November, a permanent pastor was appointed. He was Atlanta, Georgia pastor Reverend Dr. Mark Wendell Thompson and his wife, Evangelist Stephanie D. Thompson, who of course was First Lady and Associate Minister. He was appointed on November 13, 2005, and preached his first sermon at Allen Temple on November 20, 2005. Soon, he adopted the theme "Becoming Whole Through Christian Living" and the church once again experienced tremendous growth in a relatively short time. The auxiliary that experienced the most growth was the youth ministry. Thompson and his wife had originally pastored New Bethel AME Church for 10 years and Big Bethel AME Church for one year; both of those churches are in Atlanta, Georgia.

In November 2007, Thompson returned to Atlanta to become the founding pastor of Redemptive Life Christian Fellowship Church.

On November 4, 2007, then 44-year-old Rev. Dr. Alphonse Allen Jr. preached his first sermon as the newly appointed pastor of Allen Temple. He previously pastored United A.M.E. Church in Xenia, Ohio.

== Upward Bound Youth Ministries ==
In December 2003, Dayton, Ohio native Cory W. Ferguson returned to Allen Temple after having been gone for a year after leading the church's youth choir. Upon his return, Reverend Jordan appointed him youth minister and in October 2004, Upward Bound Youth Ministries was founded. At its peak, the ministry had over 110 children, youth and young adults, not even including their parents and other helpers and supporters within the church.

Upward Bound Youth Ministries (commonly known as UBYM) housed the Training Choir (ages 3–5), the Children's Choir (ages 6–12), the Worship Chorale (ages 13 and up), the Empty Vessels Praise Dance Ministry and a newly formed children's praise dance ministry. These various choirs and praise dance teams ministered every second, fourth and fifth Sundays. Most members of Allen Temple, young and old alike, saw them as a blessing to the church. UBYM eventually became very active in the community, singing and dancing at various churches, gospel concerts and other Christianity-related functions.

In September 2009, Ferguson left Allen Temple and has since relocated back to Dayton, where he attends Liberated in Christ Ministries, pastored by his godmother, Apostle Diane Parks-Love.

Fran Allen (Pastor Allen's wife) is currently the leader of the children's choir and First Fruits, a new choir in the church. She is also a member of the Worship Chorale.

Minister Courtney Jackson now leads the Worship Chorale, currently known as "Anointed."

== See also ==
- History of Cincinnati, Ohio
- Race relations of Cincinnati, Ohio
