= Sigma Faye Coran =

American rabbi (1966–2020)

Rabbi Sigma Faye Coran
- Title: Senior Rabbi

Personal life
- Born: March 23, 1966 St. Louis, Missouri
- Died: May 8, 2020 (aged 54)
- Spouse: Matthew Kraus
- Children: 4
- Education: Tufts University

Religious life
- Religion: Judaism

Rabbi Sigma Faye Coran (March 23, 1966 – May 8, 2020) was Senior Rabbi at Rockdale Temple, Amberley, Ohio. She was the first woman to serve as the senior rabbi of a Cincinnati area congregation.

== Biography ==
Coran was born in St. Louis, Missouri and grew up in Akron, Ohio. She studied clinical psychology and biology at Tufts University. She was ordained at Hebrew Union College.

Coran served as Assistant Rabbi at Temple Emanuel in Worcester, Massachusetts from 1994 to 1999. Coran was appointed Senior Rabbi of Rockdale Temple, the oldest Jewish congregation in the United States west of the Allegheny Mountains, on July 1, 2004. She was the first woman to serve as the senior rabbi of a Cincinnati area congregation.

She married Rabbi Matthew Kraus with whom she had four children.

Rabbi Sigma Faye Coran died on May 8, 2020, of metastatic breast cancer.
