= Rockdale Temple =

Reform Jewish synagogue in Ohio, US

- Location in Ohio

Religion
- Affiliation: Reform Judaism
- Rite: Nusach Ashkenaz
- Ecclesiastical or organizational status: Synagogue
- Leadership: Rabbi Meredith Kahan; Rabbi Erin Binder (Assistant); Rabbi Mark N. Goldman (Emeritus)
- Status: Active

Location
- Location: 8501 Ridge Road, Amberley Village, Cincinnati, Ohio
- Country: United States
- Interactive map of Rockdale Temple
- Coordinates: 39°12′57″N 84°25′47″W

Architecture
- Type: Synagogue architecture
- Established: 1824 (as a congregation)
- Completed: 1836 (Sixth and Broadway #1); 1852 (Sixth and Broadway #2); 1869 (Eighth and Mound); 1906 (Rockdale); 1969 (Amberley Village)

Website
- rockdaletemple.org

The Rockdale Temple, formally Kahal Kadosh Bene Israel (19th-century spelling K. K. Benai Israel), is an Ashkenazi Reform Jewish congregation and synagogue, located in Amberley Village, a suburb of Cincinnati, Ohio, in the United States. Founded in 1824, it is the oldest Jewish congregation west of the Allegheny Mountains, the oldest congregation in Ohio, the second oldest Ashkenazi congregation in the United States and one of the oldest synagogues in the United States.

The synagogue is easily accessible from both I-71 (exit 14) and I-75 (exit 10) via the Ronald Reagan Cross County Highway.

== History ==
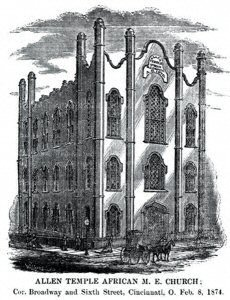
1874 engraving of the 1852 building, at that time the Allen Temple AME Church

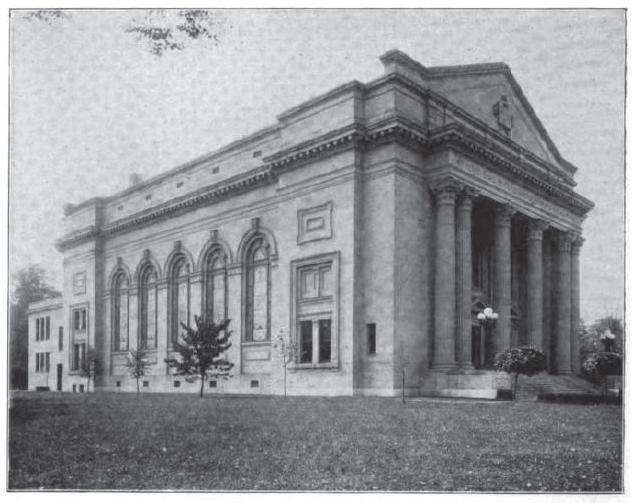
The former Temple K.K. Bene Israel in Cincinnati, designed by Cincinnati architect Rudolph Tietig

The congregation was founded in 1824 in Cincinnati, at the time, a frontier town. On January 18, 1824, the Congregation Bene Israel was formally organized; those in attendance were Solomon Buckingham, David I. Johnson, Joseph Jonas, Samuel Jonas, Jonas Levy, Morris Moses, Phineas Moses, Simeon Moses, Solomon Moses and Morris Symonds. The congregants were primarily Spanish and Portuguese Jews who had immigrated from England. On January 8, 1830, the Ohio General Assembly granted the congregation a charter.

The leaders recognized the need for a synagogue and efforts were made to raise funds for a building. In 1836 the first home at Sixth and Broadway was consecrated. In 1852 another synagogue was built on the same site. The 1852 building was sold in 1870 to the Allen Temple AME Church.

On 27 August 1869, the congregation dedicated a large building at Eighth and Mound Streets.

In 1906 the congregation moved to the Neoclassical Rockdale Temple, designed by Cincinnati architect Rudolph Tietig (1877–1958). The 1906 building no longer exists.

Since 1969, the congregation has worshiped in a new synagogue at 8501 Ridge Road in Amberley Village. Dave Brubeck's cantata The Gates of Justice (1969) had its first performance at the new Rockdale Temple.

For thirty-one years readers or cantors conducted services. In 1855, Dr. Max Lilienthal was elected as the first permanent rabbi. Under Dr. Lilienthal's leadership many reforms were introduced into the previously orthodox service and the congregation was actively involved in the beginnings of the Reform movement. Since that time there have been nine rabbis; Rabbi Meredith Kahan now serves the congregation.

Raphael Benjamin was rabbi of the congregation from 1882 to 1888.

Throughout the long history of the congregation distinguished rabbis have relied on remarkably able and committed lay leadership. Women have contributed notably, serving as presidents of the congregation as well as assistant and senior rabbis. Rabbis and members have participated actively in communal activities in the Jewish and general community.

== The congregation today ==
A progressive spirit and recognition of the need for change and growth characterize the goals of the congregation. There is outreach to a diverse membership. In addition to the religious school, the congregation participates in the Cincinnati Reform Jewish High School. The Sisterhood (Women of Reform Judaism), the Brotherhood and the youth groups facilitate activities which enhance congregational life. Various adult education programs are offered with many issues addressed in evening classes.

Rockdale Temple has been at the forefront of Reform Judaism in America and was one of the founding congregations of the Union of American Hebrew Congregations and the Hebrew Union College-Jewish Institute of Religion.

During its history, nine rabbis have been its spiritual leaders. Rabbi Sigma Faye Coran served the congregation from 2004 to 2020.

Its rabbi, educator, staff and lay-leaders help to guide and teach congregants to create personally fulfilling expressions of their Judaism. It offers a choice of programming for the needs of its diverse congregation and emphasizes the value of lifelong learning.

== See also ==
- History of the Jews in Cincinnati
- Oldest synagogues in the United States
