= Betts–Longworth Historic District =

Historic district in Ohio, United States

- U.S. National Register of Historic Places
- U.S. Historic district
- Cincinnati Local Historic Landmark
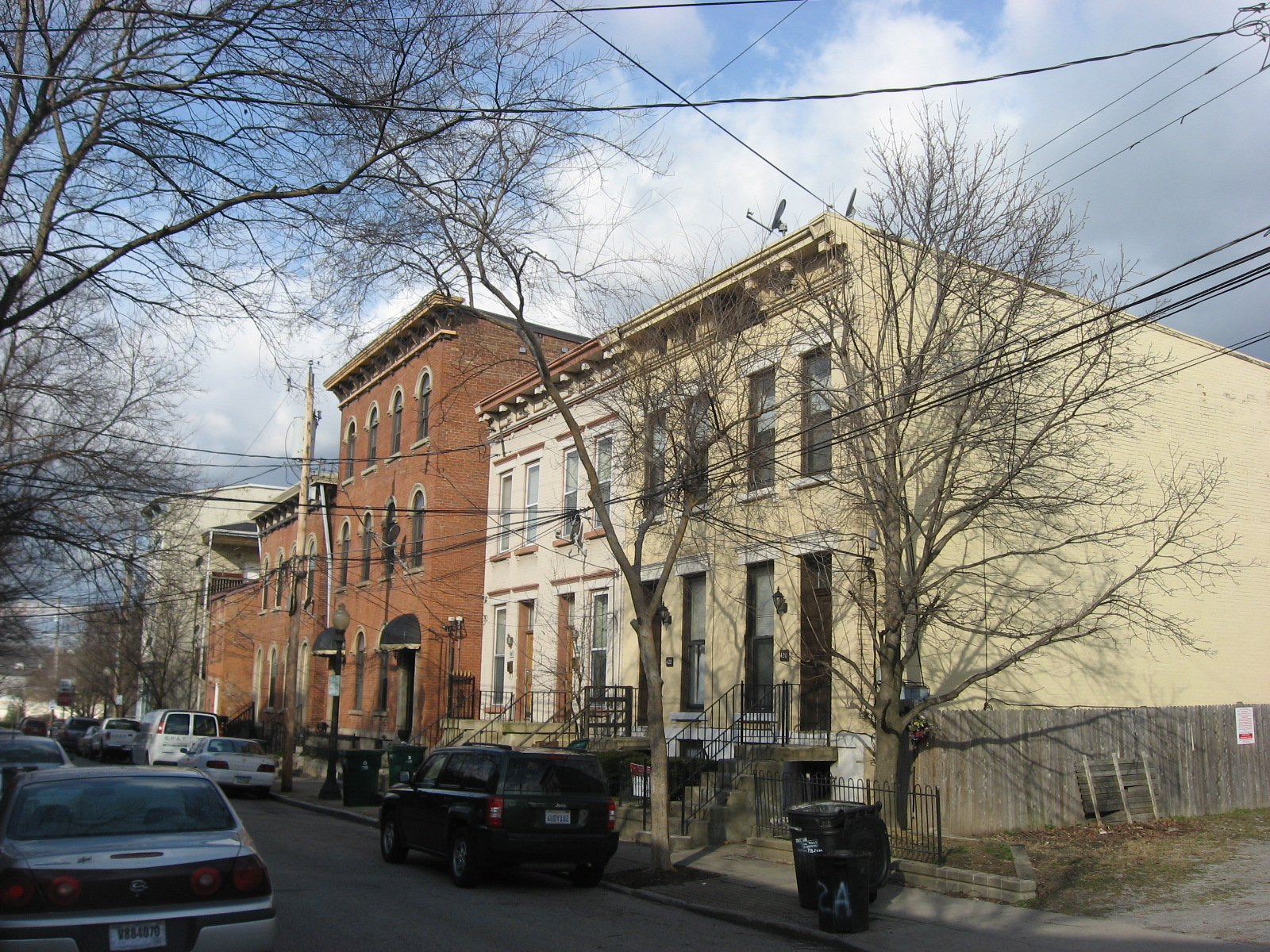
- Chestnut Street in the district

- Location within Ohio Location within the United States
- Location: Roughly bounded by Ezzard Dr., Central Ave., and Mound and Old Court Sts., Cincinnati, Ohio
- Coordinates: 39°6′26″N 84°31′21″W
- Area: 12.4 acres (5.0 ha)
- Built: 1804
- Architectural style: Italianate, Queen Anne, Federal
- NRHP reference No.: 83004304
- Added to NRHP: November 29, 1983

The Betts–Longworth Historic District is located just northwest of downtown Cincinnati, Ohio. The district consists of a ten-block sub-neighborhood of the historic West End of Cincinnati that contains Federal, Italianate and Queen Anne styles. The Betts House located at 416 Clark Street was built in 1804 and is the oldest brick house in Ohio. The Old Jewish Cemetery, Cincinnati is also located in the district.

The district was listed on the National Register of Historic Places in 1983 because of its architecture and because of a potential archaeological site within its boundaries.
