= Rudolph Tietig House =

Historic home in Cincinnati

Coordinates: 39°08′15″N 84°26′56″W

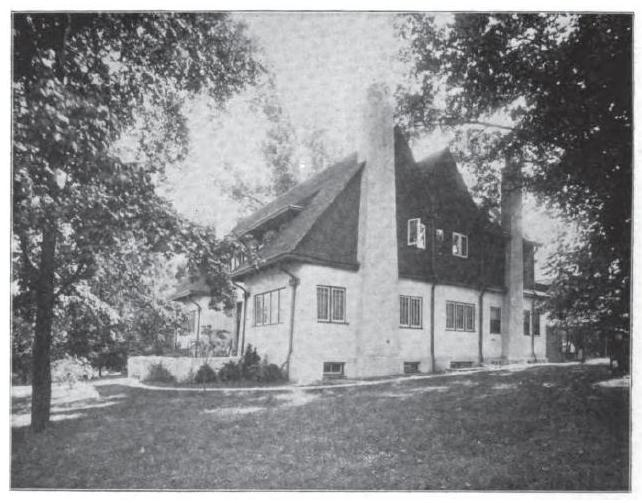
Home of Rudolph Tietig's in Cincinnati, Ohio

The Rudolph Tietig House is a historic home in Cincinnati designed by Rudolph Tietig's Tietig & Lee architecture firm.
