= Swifton Center =

Shopping mall in Cincinnati, Ohio

Coordinates: 39°11′14″N 84°27′49″W

- Rollman & Sons department store at Swifton Center, c. 1960
- Location: Cincinnati, Ohio, U.S.
- Address: 7030 Reading Road
- Opened: October 24, 1956; 70 years ago
- Closed: March 28, 2013; 13 years ago
- Previous names: Swifton Commons; Jordan Crossing
- Developer: General Development
- Owner: City of Cincinnati
- Num. of stores: 60
- Num. of anchor tenants: 1
- Floor area: 547,626 square feet (50,876.1 m^{2})
- Floors: 1

Swifton Center was a shopping mall in Cincinnati, Ohio, United States. Opened in 1956 as the first mall in the Cincinnati area, it was initially an open-air complex featuring Rollman & Sons department store as the sole anchor store. This store was converted to Mabley & Carew in 1960, and again to Elder-Beerman in 1978. Other major tenants included Kroger, Liberal Market, G. C. Murphy, and S. S. Kresge. The mall had undergone a severe decline in tenancy by the early 1980s, resulting from the relocation of Kroger and deferred maintenance of the property.

In 1985, Edward J. DeBartolo Corporation purchased the mall and renovated it as Swifton Commons. As part of this renovation, the mall gained a number of outlet stores. Despite initial success, the renovated mall underwent another severe decline in tenancy by the mid-1990s due to the bankruptcy of key tenants such as Elder-Beerman. Allen Temple AME Church bought the mall and renamed it to Jordan Crossing, with the intent of replacing many of the inline tenants with offices. This was unsuccessful, and by 2013, the mall was demolished except for offices in the former location of Elder-Beerman.

== History ==
Retail developer Jonathan Woodner first announced plans for Swifton Center in 1951, and sold his stake in the mall to Stahl Development in 1954. The site chosen for the center was the southeast corner of Reading Road (U.S. Route 42) and Seymour Avenue (SR 561) within the city limits of Cincinnati, Ohio, a site determined by market analysts to be the center of population for the Cincinnati market at the time. It would also be the first shopping mall in the Cincinnati area. Plans for the center called for approximately 54 tenants lining both sides of an open-air concourse, along with parking for over 3,000 cars and a service tunnel for delivery trucks underneath the center. A branch of the local department store Rollman & Sons (then owned by Allied Stores), which also operated a store in downtown Cincinnati at the time, would serve as the anchor store at the south end. The mall would overall consist of just under 600,000 square feet (56,000 m^{2}) of shop space on 41 acres (17 ha) of land. Overall building costs for the center were estimated at $12 million. Stahl Development and Sun Construction Company were announced as the mall's developers, with Frederick A. Schmidt., Inc. as leasing agent; however, Stahl Development sold its share to General Development in early 1955. At the time of groundbreaking, tenants confirmed for the center included two variety stores (G. C. Murphy and S. S. Kresge), two supermarkets (Kroger and Dayton-based Liberal Market), along with a Walgreens drugstore. Standard Oil of Ohio (Sohio) built two gas stations on the mall's periphery.

Swifton Center opened for business on October 24, 1956. The central mall corridor was lined with protective canopies and featured several redwood benches. Rollman & Sons department store consisted of over 140,000 square feet (13,000 m^{2}) on three floors. Amenities of the store included a 140-seat restaurant, an auditorium, a malt shop, a beauty shop, and a children's hair salon. The 47,789-square-foot (4,439.7 m^{2}), two-story G. C. Murphy store was both their first in Cincinnati, and the first in the entire chain to sell furniture. Kroger's 19,300-square-foot (1,790 m^{2}) store was their largest in southern Ohio at the time, and its opening resulted in the closure of five other nearby stores which the chain deemed "too small". One year after opening, Swifton Center hosted a first-anniversary celebration which included a performance by 66-year-old female stunt diver Ella "Grandma" Carver, live television broadcasts on WCPO-TV, and a prize drawing with a grand prize package valued at $1,000. General Development president Guilford Glazer noted that the center had exceeded all sales expectations within the first year, as well as the national average for new centers built across the United States at the time, while studies conducted by Allied Stores concluded that the Rollman & Sons department store had exceeded sales expectations as well.

In 1960, Allied Stores also acquired the local department store Mabley & Carew, and announced that both the Swifton Center and downtown locations of Rollman & Sons would be converted to that name. This move would also give Mabley & Carew a larger storefront downtown by moving into the former Rollman & Sons building. Swifton Center would be Mabley & Carew's third location, after the downtown store and another at Western Hills Plaza on the city's west side. Mabley & Carew thoroughly renovated the building to meet its merchandising needs, which included dedicating the entire second floor to women's apparel and the third level to housewares, along with the addition of suits and furs. After renovation was complete, the department store was fully reopened in November 1960.

Fifth-anniversary festivities for the mall in 1961 included a performance by singers from the local country music-themed television talent show Midwestern Hayride, and a fashion council sponsored by Mabley & Carew to assist teenaged girls in making their own clothes. Midwestern Hayride performances were also included as part of the mall's tenth-anniversary celebration in 1966, along with a puppet show, sock hop, and another prize giveaway. In addition, Swifton Center became the first mall in the United States to issue its own credit card, known as the All-N-1 Chargit Card; customers could sign up for the card at any merchant in the mall and have purchases from all stores except Mabley & Carew charged to one account.

=== Decline and conversion to Swifton Commons ===
At the time of the mall's twentieth anniversary in 1976, its owners announced plans to enclose the then-open air concourses following the opening of several other, larger malls in the area such as Tri-County Mall and Northgate Mall. Swifton Center consisted of 56 stores at the time, among which were Lerner New York, Baker Shoes, and Hancock Fabrics. No renovations had begun by 1978, at which point the mall had begun to suffer from deferred maintenance of the parking lot and outer structures. Kroger had also confirmed that it would be relocating to Hillcrest Square, a strip mall under development across the street, due to a need for a larger store. The mall's main anchor store changed names again in 1978 when the Dayton-based department store Elder-Beerman acquired Mabley & Carew. One year later, Liberal Market closed its Swifton Center location along with two other Cincinnati stores and one in Dayton. Glazer Enterprises, of which mall owner General Development was a subsidiary, submitted a request to the state of Ohio for $10 million in industrial revenue bonds to begin renovations in 1980. The company also hired a consulting firm to study possible improvements of the center, and stated that renovation plans would consist of an exterior cleanup followed by an interior renovation. By 1981, Swifton Center had an occupancy of about 52 percent, a figure including mostly local stores which at the time were on monthly leases; among the vacancies were the former locations of Kroger, Walgreens, and Lerner New York.

Edward J. DeBartolo Corporation purchased the mall in 1985, renaming it to Swifton Commons. DeBartolo renovated the mall's exterior and brought in new tenants such as Lane Bryant, Waldenbooks, and Gold Star Chili, along with a food court. At the time, representatives of both Glazer and DeBartolo noted that the mall's decline was due to a perception of white flight in the surrounding neighborhoods, a claim which they felt was unsubstantiated since many of the former mall tenants such as Kroger and Walgreens had relocated across the street and not left the neighborhood entirely. Another factor in the mall's decline prior to the mid-1980s was a lack of escalation clause in the leases of original tenants, which in turn resulted in deferred maintenance of the property and an inability to attract new tenants in order to stay competitive with other area malls. DeBartolo had been selected by Glazer Enterprises owner Jerome Glazer to assist in mall renovations, and had gotten nearly $7 million in city grants to undergo renovations. This was also the second time that DeBartolo had renovated an existing shopping mall which had begun to falter, having previously done similar work on Cheltenham Square (now Greenleaf at Cheltenham) in Philadelphia, Pennsylvania. Grand re-opening of the mall occurred in September 1985, by which point SupeRx drugstore, J. J. Newberry, Kinney Shoes, and Casual Corner had also been confirmed as tenants. Among the renovations given to the property were new maple trees along the exterior, new pavement and lighting in the parking lots, along with reconstruction of interior shop space. DeBartolo also proposed to add a second anchor store along the mall's north side. By 1993, the mall's occupancy had risen to 78 percent, with a greater emphasis on off-price and outlet stores. Included in these were a trio of stores operated by Milwaukee, Wisconsin-based Value Merchants. These were a dollar store called Everything's $1.00, a closeout store called $5 and $10 Store, and a discount sporting goods store called Play Outlet. In addition, Elder-Beerman converted its store to an outlet format which sold closeout merchandise from other Elder-Beerman locations, a move which required closing off the store's third floor. However, the trio of Value Merchants stores closed after Christmas 1993, and the Elder-Beerman outlet closed in late 1995, both due to the respective companies filing for bankruptcy.

=== Second decline and change to Jordan Crossing ===
Swifton Commons was foreclosed on in 1996 when the DeBartolo corporation defaulted on loans. It was put up for auction at a sheriff's sale in August 1996, but attracted no buyers; a second auction in October of the same year resulted in the mall getting sold to Star Bank for $2.2 million. The bank then formed an advisory panel to determine possible renovations. J. J. Newberry closed at the mall in 1997 after its parent company McCrory Stores filed for bankruptcy. At the time of the closing announcement, the advisory panel was two months past its intended deadline and yet to come up with a solution. Sandor Development, a real estate company from Indianapolis, Indiana, announced plans to buy the mall from Star Bank in 1997 but withdrew their offer in March 1998. By this point, the mall's uncertain financial state and the closure of Elder-Beerman and J. J. Newberry had caused a sharp decline in tenancy. Having already dropped to 50 percent occupancy shortly before J. J. Newberry's closure, the mall further declined by early 1998 to ten stores, of which only two (Foot Locker and National Record Mart) were national chain stores. Allen Temple AME Church expressed interest in buying the mall property in late 1998. The church announced renovation plans in late 1999, which would demolish over half of the property in favor of returning Kroger to the mall, in addition to attracting other big box retail and non-retail uses.

In 2002, the mall was officially renamed to Jordan Crossing. Construction began on the mall's northwest side for a new AME Church sanctuary, while Wilberforce University opened a branch inside the mall building, and Community Action Agencies offices opened in the former Elder-Beerman. The city of Cincinnati applied for a grant in 2010 to demolish the mall after AME Church was unable to do so. Under the church's ownership, the mall had continued to dwindle in tenancy and had not been renovated, to the point that it still had signage referring to it as Swifton Crossing. After buying the property, the city began demolition work in March 2013. Renovation plans called for the addition of retail and office space, along with a hotel. By 2014, only the Community Action Agencies building remained of the old mall. As of 2019, no further redevelopment has occurred at the former mall site, which the city of Cincinnati has renamed again to MidPointe Crossing.
