= Leonard B. Willeke =

American architect

Leonard B. Willeke was an architect.

== Biography ==
He was a native of Cincinnati and worked there with Tietig & Lee in 1911 and was listed with The Allyn Co. in 1914. Then he moved to Detroit where he "maintained a prestigious practice until his death". He "combined" Arts & Crafts with "a basis in Traditional styles" and was featured in a "highly-illustrated biography" by Thomas Brunk. Edsel and Eleanor Ford were "acquainted" with Willeke and he did residential design work for them, Roscoe B. Jackson, and Mrs. William Clay of Detroit in 1917 and 1918, as well as Henry Ford and his wife Clara. He was contracted to do the design work to house 3,500 Ford employees at "Fordson Village" until it was abandoned for the "much smaller" Molony site, with 12 house designs that were also by Willeke. He is also credited as the architect of Medbury's-Grove Lawn Subdivisions Historic District, listed on the National Register of Historic Places.
