= Raphael Benjamin =

Rabbi

Raphael Benjamin (June 19, 1846 – November 15, 1906) was an English-born Reform rabbi who ministered in Australia and America.

== Life ==
Benjamin was born on June 19, 1846, in London, England, the son of Elias Benjamin and Mary Lazarus.

Benjamin attended the Jews' Free School, then headed by Moses Angel, as well as its Talmud Torah under Myer D. Davis and Rabbi George J. Emanuel. In 1860, he won the Jews' Commemoration Scholarship. He was appointed pupil teacher in the school while still studying Hebrew and pedagogy. He obtained his teacher's certificate in 1868, and three years later he received a B.A. from the University of London. In 1874, he was ordained a rabbi by Chief Rabbi of Great Britain Nathan M. Adler, Rabbi Samson Rausuk, and Rev. Aaron L. Green. After he was certified a teacher with the endorsement of Matthew Arnold and Peter le Page Renouf, he became a member and examiner of the Tonic Sol-fa College in London.

In 1874, Benjamin was elected assistant minister and reader of the Melbourne Hebrew Congregation in Melbourne, Australia and master of Jewish schools in that city. In 1879, he received an M.A. from the University of Melbourne. In 1882, he went to America and was elected rabbi of K. K. Benai Israel in Cincinnati, Ohio, replacing the deceased Dr. Max Lilienthal. He was rabbi there for six years, ultimately leaving due to difficulties between him and his congregation. His successor there was David Philipson. While in Cincinnati, he was vice-president of the local Young Men's Hebrew Association, a Governor and Examiner of Hebrew Union College, president of the Fresh Air Fund, secretary of the fourth district Associated Charities, and a director of the Humane Society, the Kindergarten Society, and the Society of Natural History.

In 1889, Benjamin moved to New York City, New York, and became rabbi of Congregation Shaarei Shomayim (the Fifteenth Street Temple). When the congregation merged with the Fifty-Fifth Street Synagogue (Congregation Ahavath Chesed), he ministered at large in the city, becoming secretary of the Board of Jewish Ministers (later known as the New York Board of Rabbis) and conducting services in the Hebrew Orphan Asylum. In 1902, he became rabbi of the Keap Street Temple in Brooklyn (Congregation Beth Elohim). He retired from there three years later to focus on his literary work. He primarily wrote on Jewish education, which at the time was relatively unexplored in America at the time. He wrote Guide to the Jewish Religion (which won the Isaac Cohen Prize in 1884), and in 1885, he published A Confirmation Class-Book.

Benjamin was a Republican. He became a Fellow of the American Association for the Advancement of Science in 1887. He became a member of the Manhattan Chess Club and secretary of the ninth district of the Charity Organization Society after moving to New York. He was also chairman of the Board of Inspectors of the Young Men's Hebrew Association and a member of the National Geographic Society, the Metropolitan Museum of Art, the Central Conference of American Rabbis, the American Jewish Historical Society, and the Jewish Home for the Aged.

Benjamin died in his room at the Hotel St. George on November 15, 1906. He was buried in Salem Fields Cemetery.
