= Medbury's–Grove Lawn Subdivisions Historic District =

Historic district in Michigan, United States

- U.S. National Register of Historic Places
- U.S. Historic district
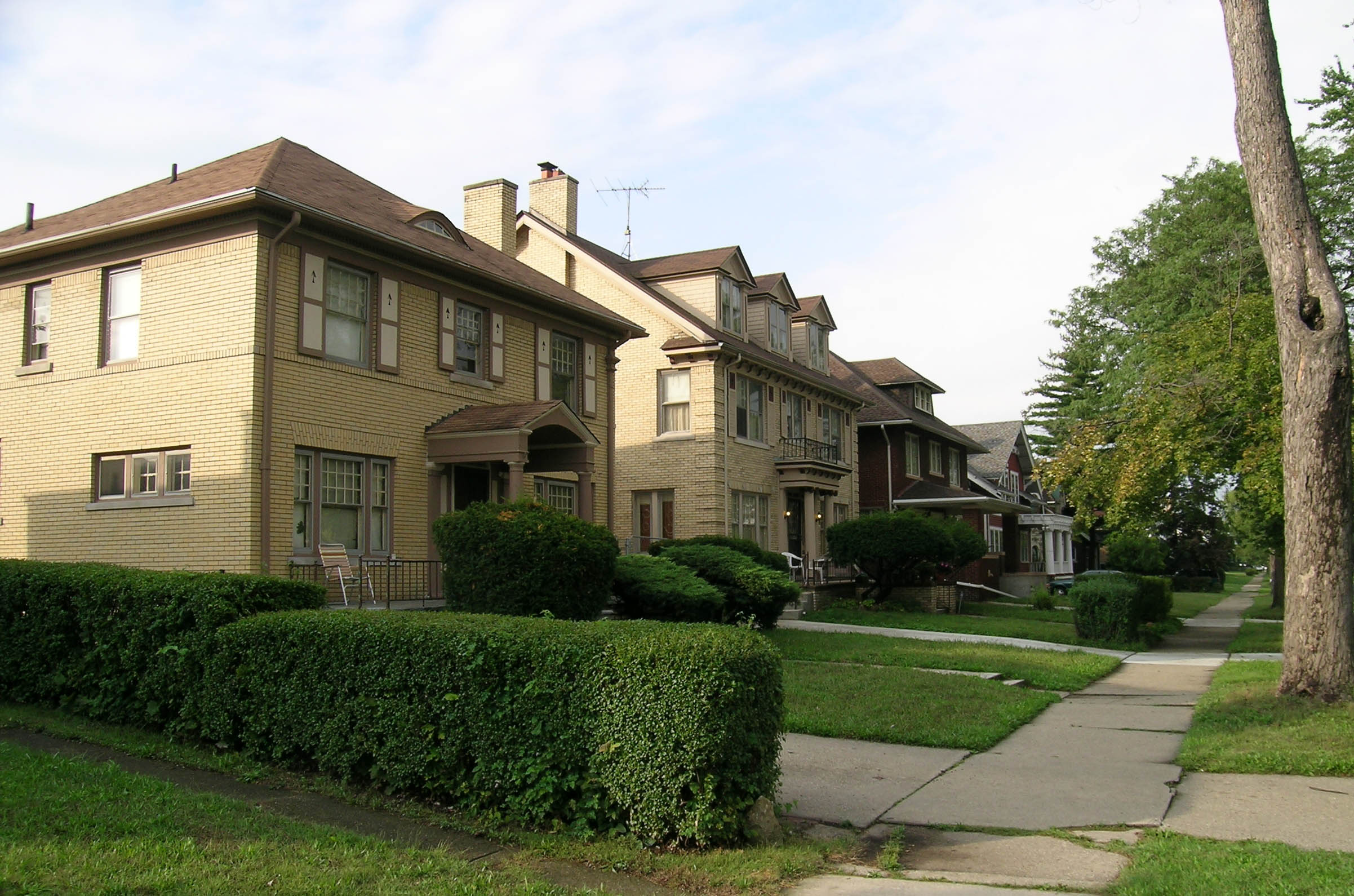
- Streetscape on Puritan near Woodward

- Location within Michigan Location within the United States
- Interactive map
- Location: Highland Park, Michigan
- Coordinates: 42°24′46″N 83°6′28″W
- Architect: Leonard B. Willeke
- Architectural style: Colonial Revival, Bungalow/Craftsman, Tudor Revival
- NRHP reference No.: 88000049
- Added to NRHP: February 8, 1988

The Medbury's–Grove Lawn Subdivisions Historic District is a residential historic district located in Highland Park, Michigan. It runs along three east–west streets: Eason Street, Moss Street, and Puritan Street, from Hamilton Avenue on the west to Woodward Avenue on the east. The district was listed on the National Register of Historic Places in 1988.

== History ==
Highland Park was a farming community until near the turn of the twentieth century. Soon after 1900, major area manufacturers began building large plants in the area, including Ford, Brush-Maxwell (later Chrysler), and Burroughs Corporation. As a result, the population of Highland Park exploded, increasing by a factor of ten between 1900 and 1910 (from 427 to 4120), and by another factor of ten by 1920 (to 46,499). The residential areas of Highland Park followed suit, including the Medbury's and Grove Lawn subdivisions, which were platted at some time between 1904 and 1914. Most of the houses within the subdivisions were constructed between 1914 and 1924, with construction continuing, albeit more slowly, through about 1934.

== Description ==
The Medbury's–Grove Lawn Subdivisions Historic District is a residential neighborhood of single-family, detached homes. There are 272 homes located within the district, with 251 of them classified as contributing to the district's historic character.

The neighborhood was built up primarily in the 1910s and 1920s, and features a variety of architectural styles that were popular at the time. Bungalows and bungalow-style houses with Craftsman or Colonial details predominate, and, in fact, the neighborhood is significant for containing Michigan's most outstanding collection of single-family bungalows and bungalow-style homes. However, foursquare, Colonial Revival, and English cottage homes are also present within the neighborhood. The homes in the district are notable for their variety and the level of craftsmanship and detailing, and are excellent examples of the variety found in American suburban domestic architecture of the period 1900–1930.

The district also contains 272 garages and sheds, located along alleys behind the homes. Of these, 250 appear to date from the neighborhood's original development, and reflect the upwardly-mobile, middle-class character of the neighborhood.

== Gallery ==
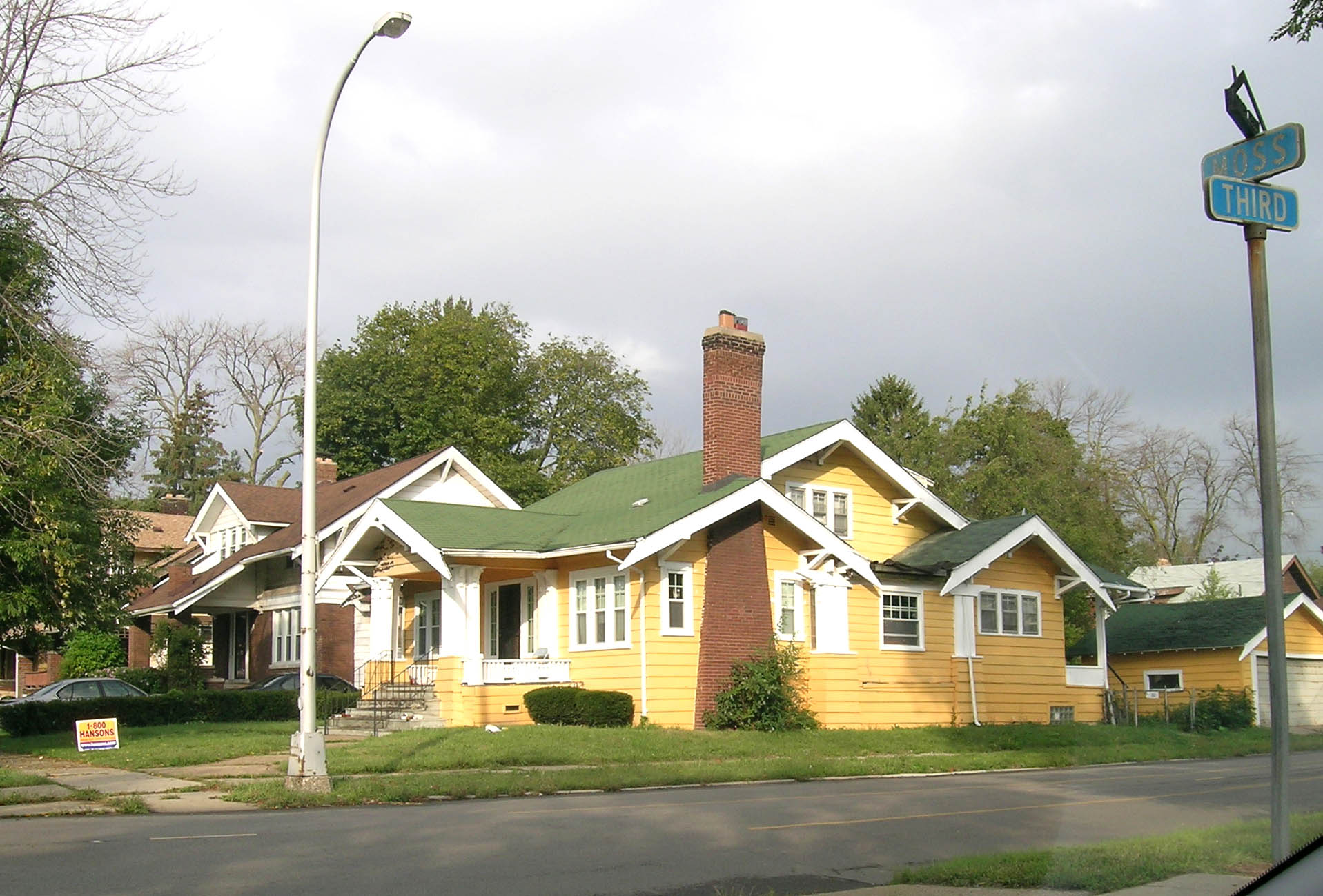
Bungalow at Moss and Third

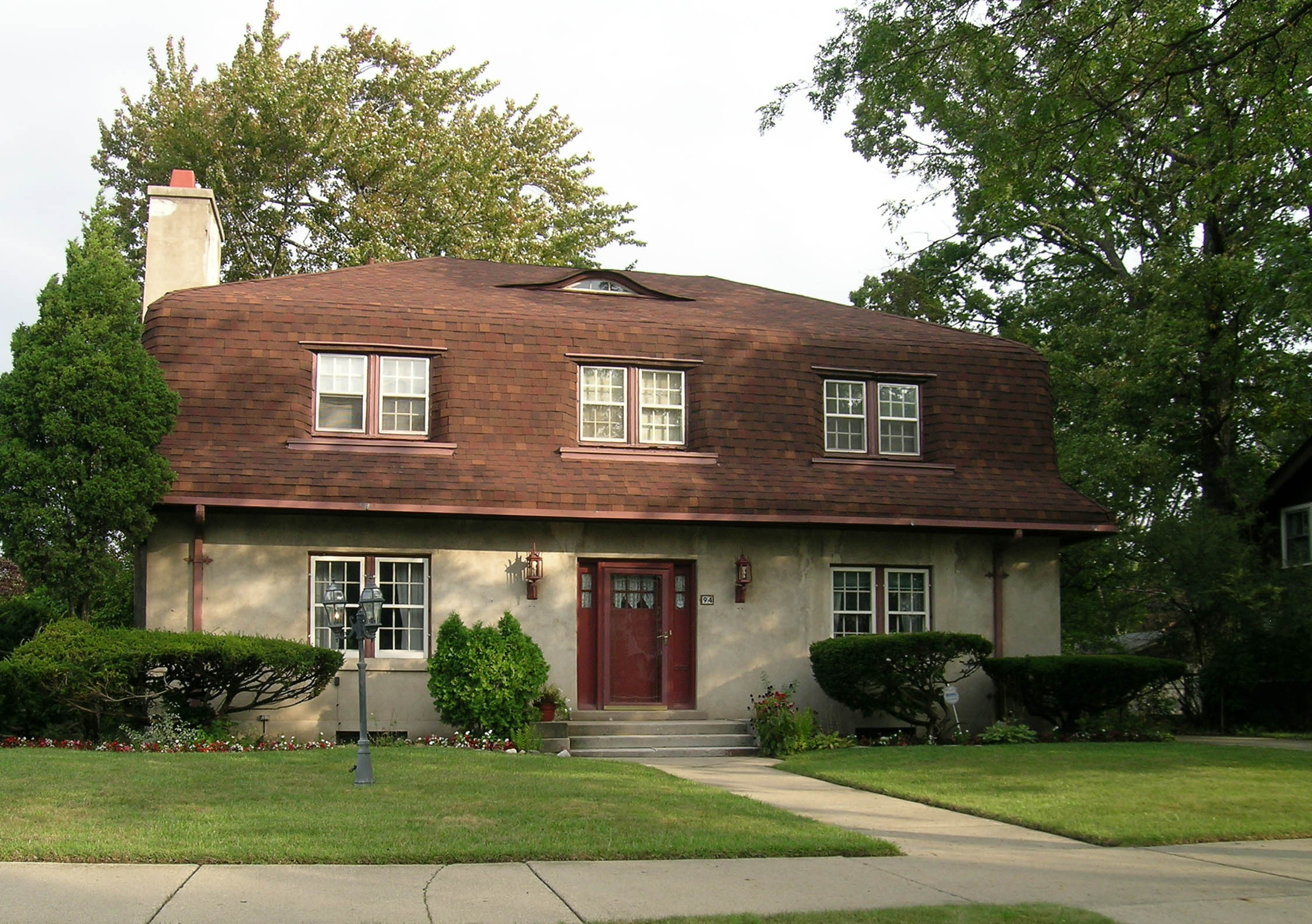
House at Moss and Second

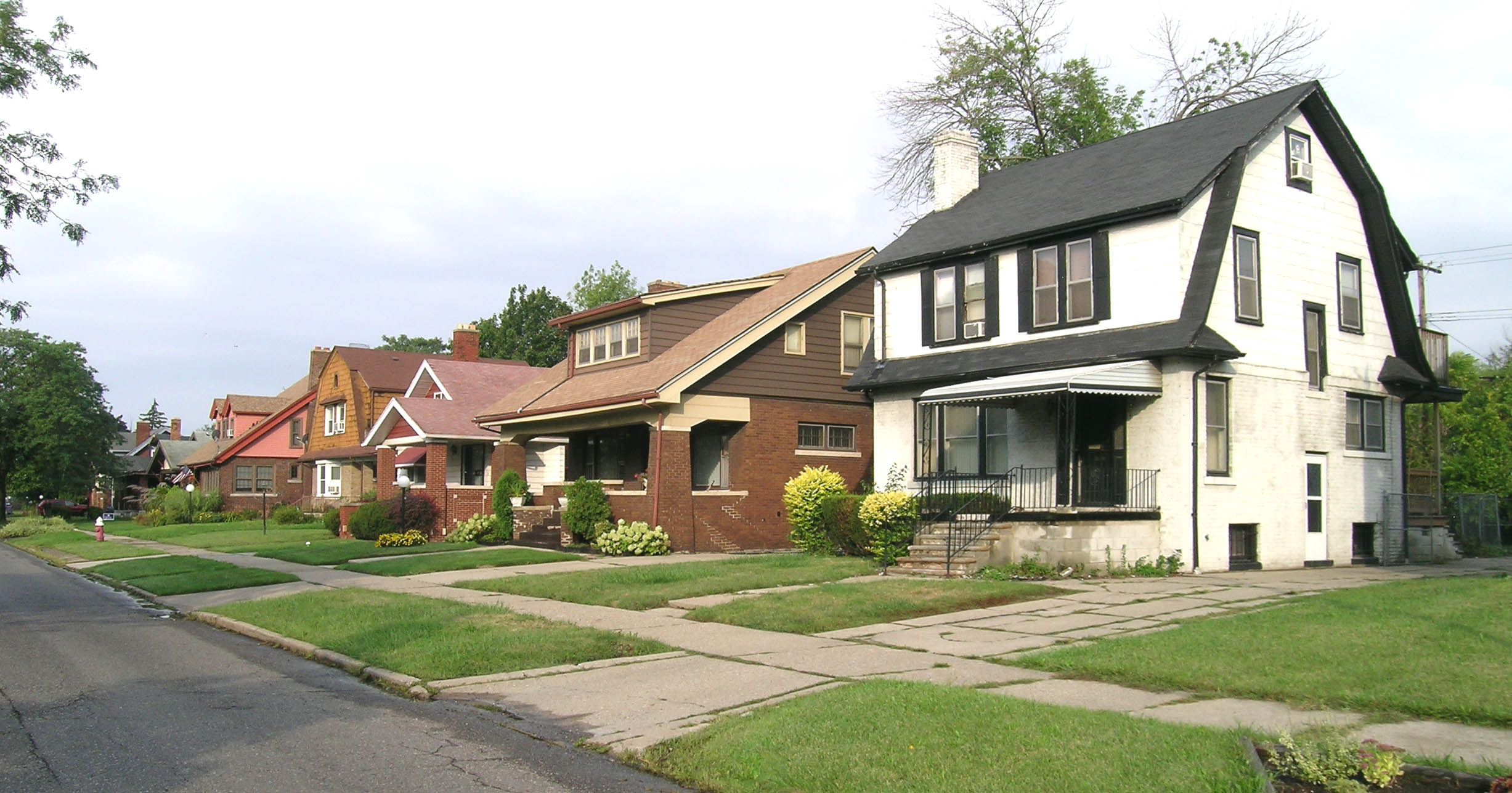
Streetscape on Puritan
