= West End, Cincinnati =

Coordinates: 39°06′43″N 84°31′31″W

West End
- Neighborhood of Cincinnati
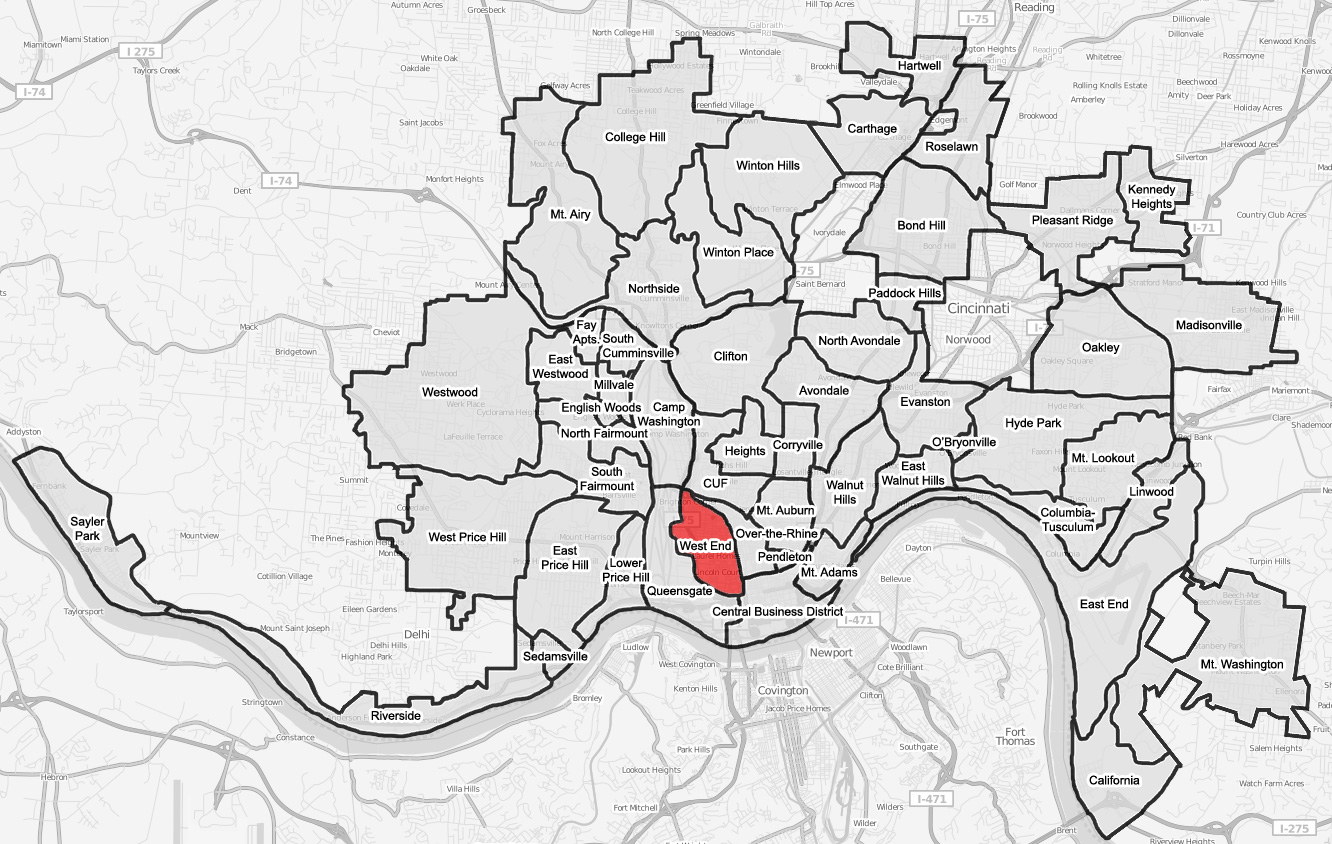
- West End (red) within Cincinnati, Ohio.
- Country: United States
- State: Ohio
- City: Cincinnati

Population (2020)
  - Total: 6,824
- Time zone: UTC-5 (EST)
  - Summer (DST): UTC-4 (EDT)
- ZIP code: 45214

West End is one of the 52 neighborhoods of Cincinnati, Ohio. Originally a large residential neighborhood, the majority of the area was demolished in the mid-20th century for the construction of highway interchanges and an industrial park known as Queensgate. The population was 6,824 at the 2020 census.

== History ==
The historic West End was largely razed in the 1950s and 60s which led to a large drop in population from 67,520 in 1950 to 17,068 in 1970. This razing was done as part of a series of urban renewal projects and the construction of Interstate 75, its interchange with Interstate 71 and the construction of the 6th St Expressway for U.S. Route 50.

The largest of these urban renewal projects was the Kenyon-Barr Renewal Plan. This plan formed the industrial neighborhood Queensgate through razing of the Kenyon-Barr neighborhood on the Lower West End from 1959 to 1973. The Queensgate project was undertaken in phases over roughly four decades. Queensgate I resulted in an undistinguished but successful industrial park, which includes service industries, light manufacturing, transportation facilities and warehouses as well as offices, hotels and restaurants. I-75 and Queensgate I together made up the nation’s second largest so-called 'slum clearance' up to that time. Nearly 3,700 buildings on 450 acres were razed. 9800 families, 27,000 people—97% of whom were Black—were displaced. Combined with other projects such as Richmond-Laurel, this caused massive amounts of displacement, leading to 50,452 Cincinnatians being forced to relocate or move elsewhere in the city from 1950 to 1970.

The West End is the location of City West, the largest housing development project in Cincinnati since World War II. The project transformed the once low-income area into a mixed-income development. In 1999 many of the old buildings were leveled to make way for townhomes.

Controversy erupted in 2005 when plans were announced to open a $15-million "one-stop" social services facility at 800 Bank Street. The project, known as CityLink, would be the largest such facility in Cincinnati. Some argued that it would increase crime and poverty in the West End, decrease property value, and undermine the redevelopment there. Some even accused the city of trying to relocate the poor from the thriving Over-the-Rhine neighborhood to the West End. However, proponents argued that the West End's central location makes it easy for the poor to access. A lawsuit to stop the CityLink project failed, as did the subsequent appeal to the Ohio Supreme Court. CityLink Center has since launched in 2013, serving over 3,000 Cincinnati residents since that time including over 250 from the West End neighborhood. The development of CityLink Center did not result in increased crime.

=== Historic sites ===
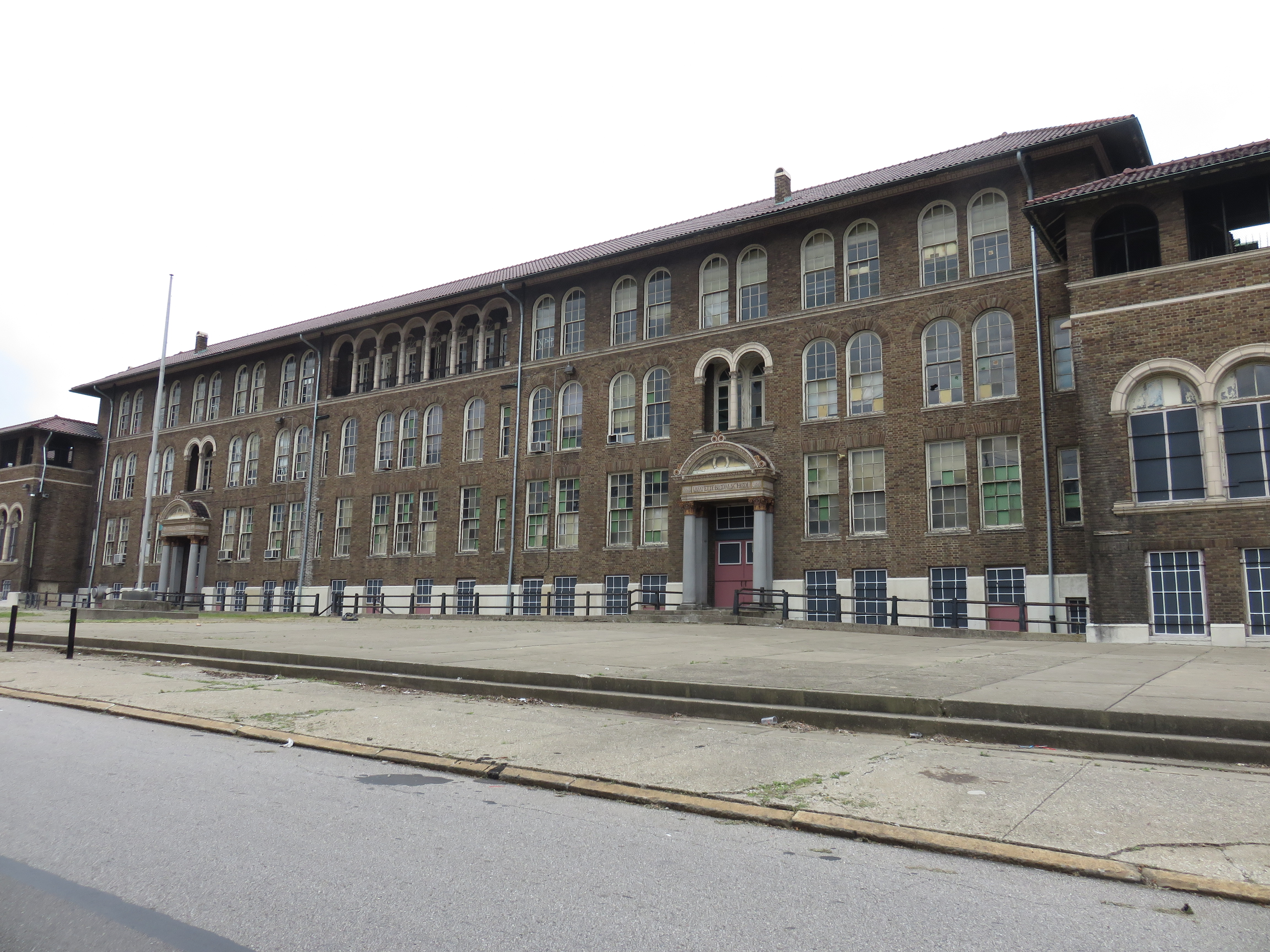
Former Lafayette Bloom School in 2017

West End is home to multiple historic buildings and districts listed on the National Register. These include Laurel Homes, Dayton Street Historic District, Betts–Longworth Historic District, and Betts House.

== Geography ==
West End is located northwest of downtown, east of Queensgate, west of Over-the-Rhine, and southeast of Fairview.

== Demographics ==
Population of West End 1840-2020
Year	Pop.	±%
1840	9,390	—
1850	24,050	+156.1%
1860	43,710	+81.7%
1870	73,518	+68.2%
1880	80,897	+10.0%
1890	84,374	+4.3%
1900	91,625	+8.6%
1910	84,325	−8.0%
1920	76,100	−9.8%
1930	67,233	−11.7%
1940	62,363	−7.2%
1950	67,520	+8.3%
1960	41,949	−37.9%
1970	17,068	−59.3%
1980	12,886	−24.5%
1990	11,370	−11.8%
2000	8,115	−28.6%
2010	6,627	−18.3%
2020	6,824	+3.0%
Wards were utilized from 1840-1890 which have slightly different boundaries from census tracts utilized from 1900-40.

As of the census of 2020, there were 6,824 people living in the neighborhood. There were 3,941 housing units. The racial makeup of the neighborhood was 14.7% White, 78.3% Black or African American, 0.1% Native American, 0.6% Asian, 0.1% Pacific Islander, 0.9% from some other race, and 5.3% from two or more races. 2.2% of the population were Hispanic or Latino of any race.

There were 3,512 households, out of which 35.8% were families. About 54.3% of all households were made up of individuals.

40.2% of the neighborhood's population were under the age of 18, 51.4% were 18 to 64, and 8.4% were 65 years of age or older. 43.3% of the population were male and 56.7% were female.

According to the U.S. Census American Community Survey, for the period 2016-2020 the estimated median annual income for a household in the neighborhood was $19,499. About 50.4% of family households were living below the poverty line. About 24.0% of adults had a bachelor's degree or higher.

== Attractions ==
TQL Stadium, the home stadium of Major League Soccer team FC Cincinnati, is located in the neighborhood.

== Infrastructure ==
The West End is served by a branch of the Public Library of Cincinnati and Hamilton County.
