= Queensgate, Cincinnati =

Warehouse district in Cincinnati, Ohio

Coordinates: 39°6′N 84°32′W

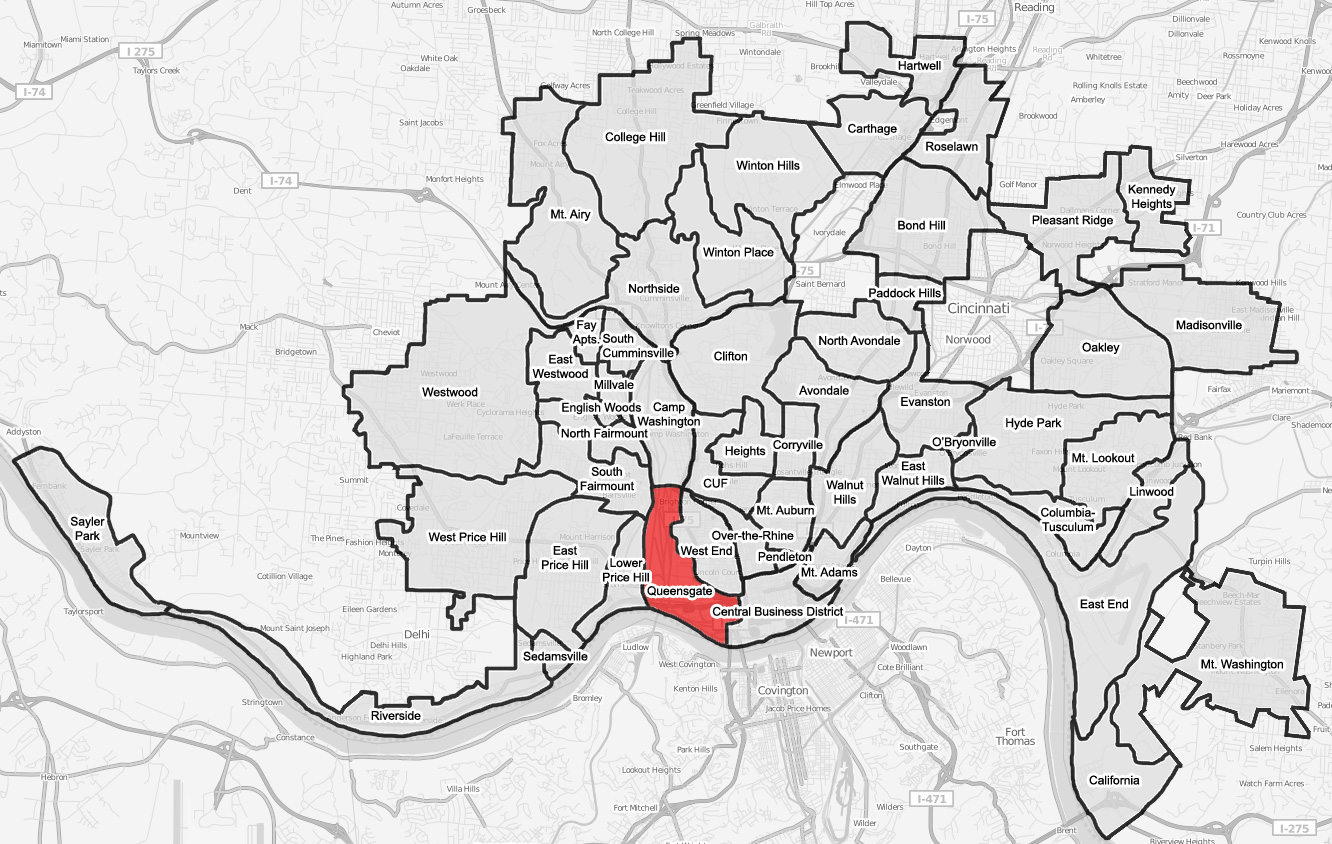
Queensgate is a neighborhood of Cincinnati, Ohio.

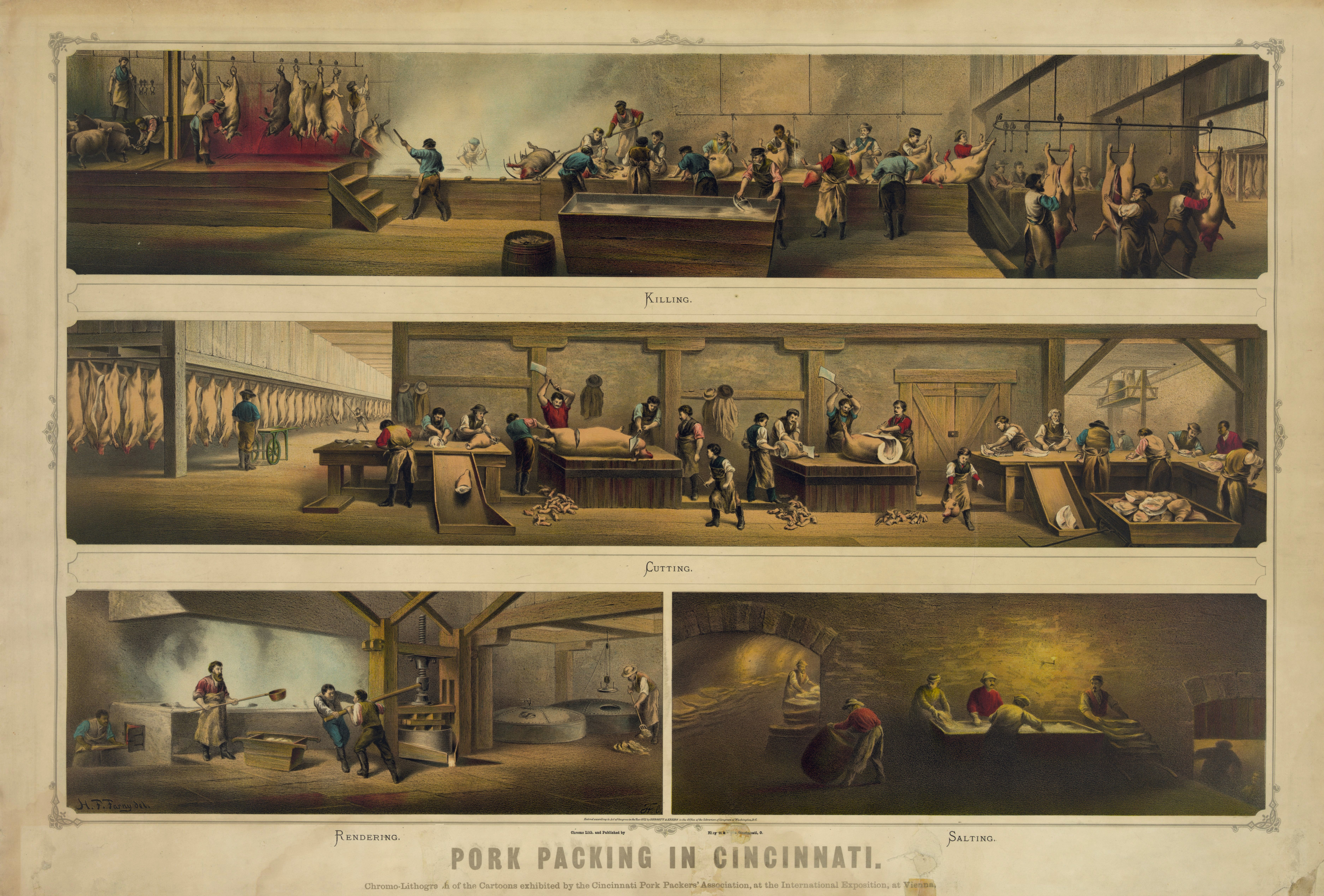
Queensgate was the center of Cincinnati's pork packing industry.

Queensgate is one of the 52 neighborhoods of Cincinnati, Ohio. It sits in the valley of Downtown Cincinnati and is dominated by industrial and commercial warehouses. Cincinnati's nickname of "Porkopolis" started here with hog slaughtering in the early 19th century.

== History ==
In 2010, the population of Queensgate was only 142. But as recently as 1958, the neighborhood, formerly part of West End and known as the "Lower West End" or the Kenyon-Barr neighborhood, had a population of 25,737, estimated at 5% of the city's total population.

In the late 1950s and early 1960s, pursuant to the Metropolitan Master Plan of 1948, a City Plan for Cincinnati, and under the guise of slum clearance and urban renewal, the predominantly African-American neighborhood was razed to make way for the new Interstate 75 and a new industrial district known as Queensgate. In 2023, the Cincinnati city council issued an apology for the decision to tear down Kenyon-Barr, describing the decision as "rooted in institutional racism."

Prior to this demolition, the neighborhood was the subject of significant photographic documentation, and in 2017, many of these photographs were placed on public exhibition for the first time at the Cincinnati Museum Center.

In early 2024, community leaders proposed reconnecting Queensgate to downtown Cincinnati through a reconstructed street grid, made possible by the larger project of constructing a new companion bridge for the Brent Spence Bridge. As of February 2024, discussions about this possibility were ongoing. In late May 2024, the proposal was approved.

== Main sights ==
Queensgate is home to Cincinnati Union Terminal. From 1884 to 1970, the Cincinnati Reds played at three separate parks at the intersection of Findlay Street and Western Avenue in Queensgate—the last 57½ of those years at Crosley Field. The former site of home plate of Crosley Field has been painted in an alley. Local Fox affiliate WXIX-TV (channel 19), owned by Gray Television, is based out of what was formerly the Harriet Beecher Stowe School, a majority-Black junior high school.
