= Rudolph Tietig =

- Born: April 25, 1877; Cincinnati, Ohio, U.S.
- Died: February 8, 1958 (aged 80)
- Education: Massachusetts Institute of Technology
- Occupation: Architect
- Practice: Tietig & Lee

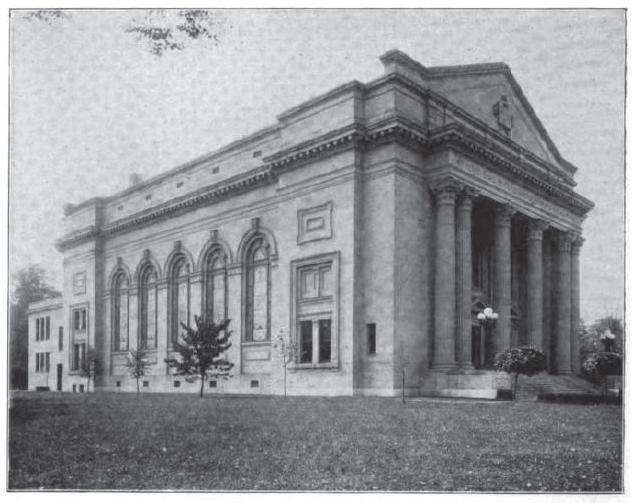
The former Temple K.K. Bene Israel in Cincinnati ca. 1912

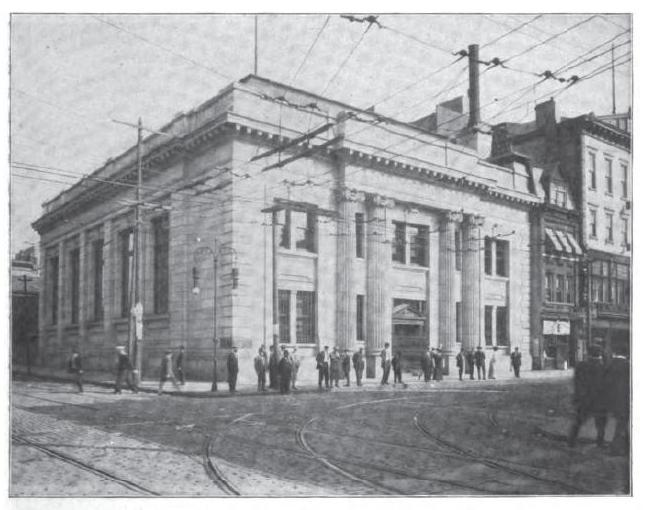
Western German Bank in Cincinnati photographed ca. 1912

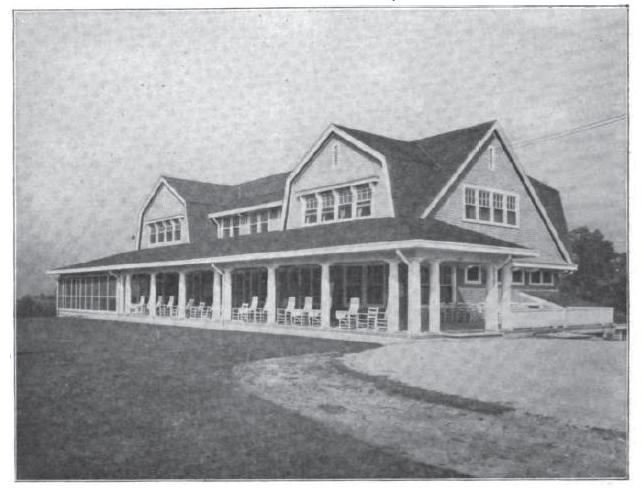
Losantiville Country Club

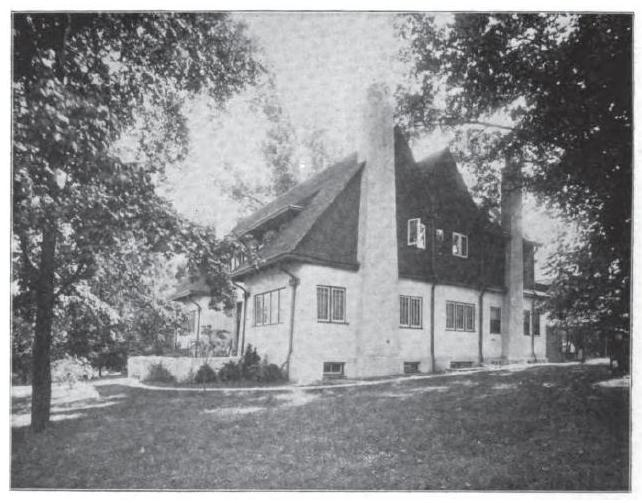
Rudolph Tietig Home in Cincinnati

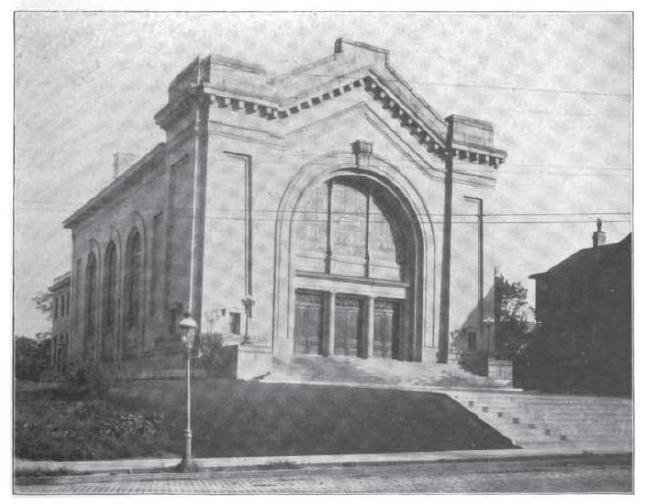
Temple Sh'Brith Israel Ahabath Achim

Rudolph Tietig (1877-1958) was an architect in Cincinnati, Ohio, United States and a partner in the Tietig & Lee architectural firm with Walter H. Lee (1877-1952).

== Early life and education ==
Tietig was born in Mount Auburn, Cincinnati to German parents. His father, Arnold Tietig, came to Cincinnati at the age of 20 and was a cigar maker. Tietig attended the Technical School of Cincinnati and Massachusetts Institute of Technology, graduating in the class of 1898 with a Bachelor of Science degree.

== Career ==
Tietig worked in New York with Robert Maynicke and G.K. Thompson before returning to Cincinnati. His firm employed Leonard B. Willeke as a designer for a "short time" and Leo Townsend for a period that included 1906 and 1913. He returned to Cincinnati to form the firm of Tietig and Lee Architects with fellow MIT graduate and boyhood friend, Walter H. Lee, in 1903.

The firm designed the homes in the Avondale and Indian Hill sections of Cincinnati including those of "prominent citizens" such as Simon Kuhn, A.G. Brunsman, and A.H. Mitchell, "as well as factories and warehouses." The firm worked with Garber & Woodward on some projects and competed with them for others. The firm designed several schools in Arts & Crafts architecture and (later) in American Colonial Revival architecture styles.

Tietig was president of American Institute of Architects Cincinnati Chapter, in 1913 while Walter L. Rapp was vice-president.

The Sayler Park School, now Sayler Park Elementary, was designed by Tietig's firm built in 1930 for $377,860. It was "touted as state of the art" at the time, and in 2010 is slated for an "estimated $12 million in additions and renovations as it celebrates its 80th birthday". The local school board decided to close the school in 2009, but later reversed itself and "opted for the renovations instead". The school is scheduled to reopen for the 2012–2013 school year after updates and expansions that include "a new two-story addition, an elevator, new gym and updates to classrooms".

Tietig designed the Ashkenazi Jewish Losantiville Country Club and two synagogues, Temple K. K. Ben Israel (now Rockdale Temple) and Temple Sh'Brith Israel Ahabath Achim. The congregation at Rockdale is one of the oldest west of the Allegheny Mountains.

== Projects ==
- Rudolph Tietig house
- Carl F. Meinken Residence Cincinnati, Ohio D. Meinken & Sons, General Contractor Cincinnati, Ohio
- F.M. Andrews Residence Fort Thomas, Kentucky D. Meinken & Sons General Contractor Cincinnati Ohio
- Andrews Steel Co. Newport, Kentucky D. Meinken & Sons General Contractor Cincinnati Ohio
- The Newport Rolling Mill Newport Kentucky D. Meinken & Sons General Contractor Cincinnati Ohio
- Losantiville Country Club
- Western German Bank formerly in South East Cincinnati on 12th and Vine streets
- Fourteenth District School
- Highland School
- Hughes High School (Cincinnati) addition (original building designed by J. Walter Stevens of St. Paul, Minnesota)
- Medical Arts Building (Memphis, Tennessee)
- Doctors' Building on Garfield Place in Cincinnati
- Garfield Hotel, Cincinnati
- Hamilton County Tuberculosis Hospital Cinti Ohio D. Meinken & Sons General Contractor Cincinnati Ohio
- Atlas National Bank Building (c.1922) on Walnut Street in Cincinnati
- Strand Theatre (Cincinnati) (1913), demolished in 1950 to make way for the current Fountain Square location.
- Plans for a five-story addition to the one-story Diem & Wing Paper Co. Building on Eggleston Avenue.
- Merchant's building, Cincinnati at 6th and College streets D. Meinken & Sons General Contractor Cincinnati Ohio
- Temple K K Ben Israel (Rockdale Temple), a Cincinnati synagogue in the neoclassical style, later demolished in favor of a contemporary style building) on Rockdale Avenue in Avondale (illustrated by Montgomery Schuyler in 1908)
- The Dietz Desk Company Building, Cincinnati D. Meinken & Sons General Contractor
- Engineering College of the University of Cincinnati (Baldwin Hall)
- Jewish Synagogue Temple S.I.A.A. formerly on Reading Road in Avondale
- Knox Presbyterian Church in Hyde Park
- "Over-the-Rhine", which either replaced or supplemented "one of Elzner's earliest works"
- Cincinnati Tennis Club (1906) on Wold and Dexter Avenues in East Walnut Hills, listed on the National Register of Historic Places
- Stowe School
- Kilgour School
- Taft School
- Sands School D. Meinken & Sons General Contractor Cincinnati, Ohio
- Sayler Park School (1930) in Sayler Park
- North side (Cumminsville) Public Library (1906).
- "Most" of the early 20th-century Cincinnati Bell Telephone suburban branch exchanges
- Medical Arts Building and Garage 248 Madison Ave. and 11 N. 4th Street in Memphis, Tennessee, listed on the National Register of Historic Places
- JC Penney store in Petoskey, MI

== Gallery ==
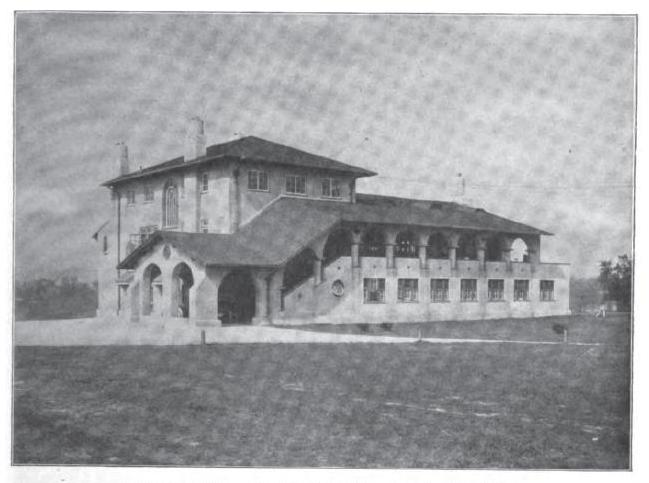
Hamilton County Golf Club near Cincinnati

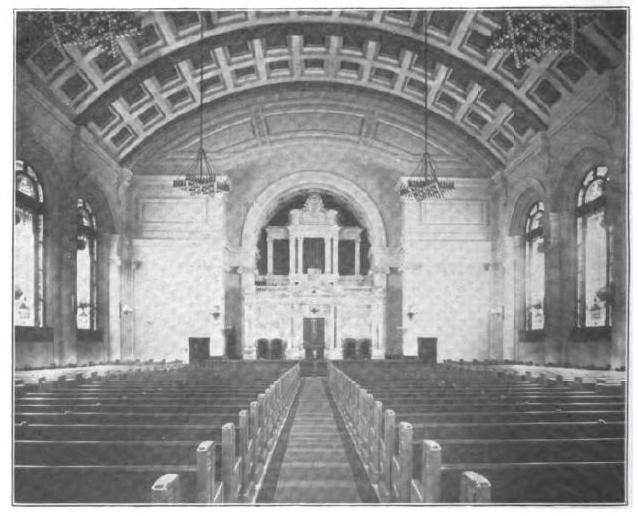
Temple K.K. Bene Israel interior

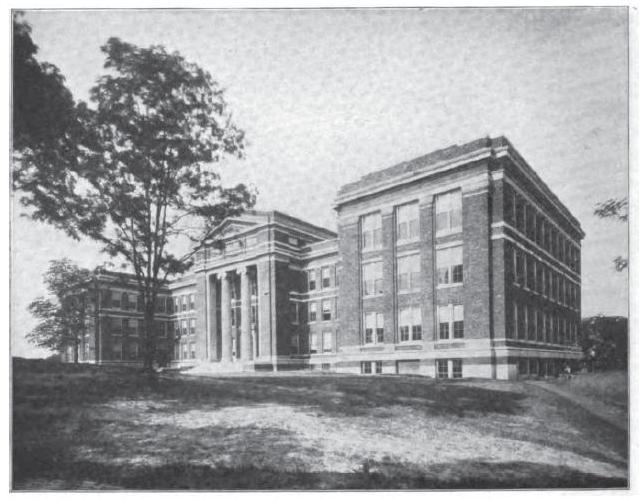
Engineering College building, University of Cincinnati
