= Max Lilienthal =

German-American rabbi (1815–1882)

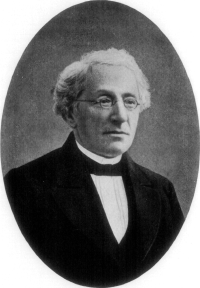
- Max Lilienthal
- Born: Max E. Lilienthal; November 6, 1815
- Died: April 5, 1882 (aged 66)
- Education: Ludwig-Maximilians-Universität München
- Occupations: School reformer Rabbi; Abolitionist
- Known for: Proponent of Reform Judaism
- Spouse: Babette "Pepi" Nettre
- Children: 8 including Philip N. Lilienthal

Max E. Lilienthal (November 6, 1815 – April 5, 1882) was a German-born adviser for the reform of Jewish schools in Russia and later a rabbi and proponent of Reform Judaism in the United States.

== Life and religion ==
=== Work for Russian Government ===
Lilienthal held a doctorate from the Ludwig-Maximilians-Universität München when Ludwig Philippson recommended him to head a school inspired by the Enlightenment in Riga, then a part of the Russian Empire. He arrived in Riga in 1840. He made a greater impact with the Minister of National Education, Sergey Uvarov, than he did with the school. The next year, Uvarov summoned Lilienthal to serve as the Ministry of National Education's "learned Jew." Lilienthal's most important task was to convince the Jews of the importance of enlightened education.

Lilienthal summoned committees from the various Jewish communities in the Pale of Settlement to provide recommendations on the reform of the schools, but the notion of reform was so controversial that many boycotted. Nonetheless, Lillienthal embarked on ambitious plans for the creation of Haskalah-inspired schools in Russia. He invited his peers in Central Europe to come and teach at Russian schools. Lilienthal did not understand the degree to which the Russian Jews resented having a foreign-inspired education imposed upon them. They saw Lilienthal as an agent of the tsarist government, which they believed wanted to convert them to Russian Orthodox Christianity.

As Pauline Wengeroff wrote in her memoirs decades later, "Dr. Lilienthal made it a point to gather many of Brest's young people around him every day, speaking to them of acquiring West European learning, offering useful bits of advice, sketching out their future as men of culture. He won the hearts of these impressionable young people who, while remaining true to their parents' religion in matters of observance, were branching off into new paths in all other respects, turning even further from the cultural orientation of the older generation."

An 1844 law, introduced by Count Sergey Semionovich Uvarov, which ordered the creation of schools in which young Jews would learn secular subjects as well as Jewish religion was a victory for Lilienthal and the Jewish Haskalah, but Lilienthal left Russia shortly afterward. His motivation for the sudden exit remains a topic of debate among scholars. According to traditional Jewish writers, particularly in the Chabad tradition, his departure was prompted by allegations from within the Haskala movement of the misappropriation of funds, leading to a Russian governmental investigation.

=== In the United States ===
Lilienthal served as a rabbi for several years after his arrival in New York City in 1845, including at the Anshe Chesed Synagogue. He opened a Jewish school in 1850. In 1855, he moved to Cincinnati to become an editor of The American Israelite and serve as rabbi of Congregation Bene Israel. As a rabbi in Cincinnati, he promoted Reform Judaism. He wrote for several publications and was an advocate for both Jewish and secular schools, teaching at Hebrew Union College and serving on the Cincinnati board of education.

Lilienthal was later an active supporter of the movement to abolish slavery in the United States.

== Personal life ==
Lilienthal married Babette "Pepi" Nettre (born 1821), daughter of his father's friend, Isaac Nettre, the Munich agent of the international banking firm of Solomon Hirsch. Two of his siblings would also marry children of Isaac Nettre: his brother, Samuel Lilienthal, married Caroline Nettre (born 1818); and his sister Henrietta Lilienthal, married Philip Nettre.

Lilienthal had eight children: Eliza Lilienthal Werner; Theodore Max Lilienthal (married to Sophie Gerstle); Albert Lilienthal; Philip N. Lilienthal; Victoria Lilienthal; Jesse Warren Lilienthal (married to Lillie Bernheimer); Esther Lilienthal Heavenrich; and Dinah Lilienthal (died in infancy).
