= Know Theatre of Cincinnati =

Theater company in Cincinnati, Ohio, United States

- Company logo
- Formation: 1997
- Type: Theatre group
- Location: Cincinnati, OH
- Artistic director: Bridget Leak
- Website: http://www.knowtheatre.com

Know Theatre of Cincinnati is a non-profit theatre company located in the historic Over-the-Rhine neighborhood of Cincinnati, Ohio, which produces contemporary and collaborative theatre that tends to be challenging and thought-provoking. MainStage performances occur in a 99-seat versatile black box theatre. Know Theatre produces a MainStage season, a SecondStage Series, an Educational Series rooted in STEM concepts, and the annual Cincinnati Fringe Festival. In 2010, Know Theatre launched the Jackson Street Market, a series of programs created to provide resources, foster collaborations, and to strengthen the local community of individual artists and independent arts organizations. Its goal is to retain artists in the city and create opportunities for them to make a living from their artistic endeavors. Know Theatre is part of an arts district in Over-the-Rhine with a number of diverse organizations including Art Academy of Cincinnati, Ensemble Theatre Cincinnati, Cincinnati Shakespeare Company, Music Hall.

== History ==
Prior to 2006, Know Theatre of Cincinnati was known as the Know Theatre Tribe and was housed at Gabriel's Corner in the fellowship hall of Salem United Church of Christ, 1425 Sycamore Street in Cincinnati, OH. Know Theatre moved into its new home on Jackson Street, merged with the Cincinnati Fringe Festival, and changed its name to Know Theatre of Cincinnati in 2006.

=== Know Theatre Tribe ===
The company was founded in the fall of 1997 when Jay B. Kalagayan formed a ‘tribe’ of artists who traveled to bookstores and venues in Cincinnati to perform original collaborative works. In 1999 the tribe took up its first residence in the basement of the church at Gabriel's Corner and produced a full season of plays.

In its early history, Know Theatre was best known for its 2003 production of Terrence McNally's play Corpus Christi. The production drew praise by winning a 2003 Post-Corbett Award and drew protests from religious groups, including a letter writing campaign in which over 20,000 post cards were mailed to the theatre.

=== Know Theatre of Cincinnati ===
In 2004, Know Theatre hired Artistic Director Jason Bruffy, founder of the Cincinnati Fringe Festival and former company manager of Cincinnati Shakespeare Company. In 2006, the company moved into its second permanent home at 1120 Jackson Street, and changed its name to Know Theatre of Cincinnati. The intent of this name change was both to acknowledge the city in which the company operates and to signify that its nomadic “tribe” days were over. Between 2006 and 2009, Know Theatre underwent an expansion of operational capacity, staff, and production values of the theatre produced.

The fall of 2009 marked a transition period for Know Theatre, with founder Jay Kalagayan and Artistic Director Jason Bruffy both leaving the company to pursue other opportunities.

=== Explosive and Evocative Live Entertainment ===
The 2009–2010 season began with Eric Vosmeier as Managing Artistic Director and featured Cincinnati's first professional production of both parts of Tony Kushner's Angels in America: A Gay Fantasia on National Themes. The production was recognized by the Acclaim Awards as Best Alternative Production and by the Cincinnati Entertainment Awards as Outstanding Play of the season. The 2009–2010 season also featured one of the highest selling productions in the company's history - Sideways Stories from Wayside School by John Olive and directed by Jason Ballweber of Four Humors Theater in Minneapolis, MN.

At the start of the 2010–2011 season, Eric Vosmeier was named Producing Artistic Director. In 2010, Know Theatre launched the Jackson Street Market, a series of programs created to provide resources, foster collaborations, and to strengthen the local community of individual artists and independent arts organizations. Its goal is to retain artists in the city and create opportunities for them to make a living from their artistic endeavors.

In 2011, construction was completed on a new marquee on the facade of Know Theatre's building funded by capital grants from The City of Cincinnati and The Greater Cincinnati Foundation.

In 2012, the American Theatre Wing, founder of the Tony Awards, awarded Know Theatre their National Theatre Company Grant.

=== Theatrical Playground ===
In 2013, following a period of strategic planning, a leadership transition was announced, with longtime scenic and lighting designer Andrew Hungerford set to become Producing Artistic Director in 2014.

In an expansion of the leadership team, Tamara Winters was hired as Associate Artistic Director in 2014.

In the coming seasons, the theatre doubled the number of performances it offered in a season, increasing the number of MainStage shows and adding a SecondStage Series.

During this time, Know Theatre was an early innovator in live streaming of second stage productions.

At the start of the Covid-19 pandemic, Know Theatre was one of the leading theatres to pivot to offering theatre at a distance, both on-line via livestream and video on demand and outdoors.

Notably, this included the premiere of Theatre: A Love Story by Caridad Svich, produced in collaboration with local dance company Pones.

In 2023 Hungerford and Winters announced that they would both be stepping down from their positions.

Hungerford's final show as Producing Artistic Director was The Light Chasers, a science fiction rock musical based on the album Light Chasers by Cloud Cult with music and lyrics by Craig Minowa.

=== Building Belonging Through Bold Theatre ===
In 2024, Bridget Leak was named Producing Artistic Director. Bridget brings 20+ years of directorial and educational experience, including shows in The Cincinnati Fringe Festival.

== Notable Productions & Playwrights ==
View a full production history on Know Theatre's Website

- 2017 Listen for the Light by Kara Lee Corthron (world premiere. Directed by Tamara Winters; scenic design by Sarah Beth Hall; costume design by Noelle Johnston; lighting design by Andrew Hungerford; sound design by Doug Borntrager)
- 2016 Pulp by Joseph Zettelmaier (National New Play Network Rolling World Premiere. Direction and lighting design by Andrew Hungerford; scenic design by Sarah Beth Hall; costume design by Noelle Johnston; sound and projection design by Doug Borntrager)
- 2015 Hundred Days by The Bengsons (directed by Anne Kauffman; scenic and lighting design by Andrew Hungerford; costume design by Noelle Wedig; sound design by Doug Borntrager)
- 2015 The Handmaid's Tale by Margaret Atwood, adapted for the stage by Joe Stollenwerk (directed by Brian Isaac Phillips; scenic and lighting design by Andrew Hungerford; costume design by Noelle Wedig; sound design by Doug Borntrager)
- 2013 When the Rain Stops Falling by Andrew Bovell (directed by Brian Isaac Phillips; scenic and lighting design by Andrew Hungerford; costume design by Noelle Wedig; sound design by Doug Borntrager)
- 2012 Bloody Bloody Andrew Jackson by Alex Timbers & Michael Friedman (directed by Eric Vosmeier; scenic and lighting design by Andrew Hungerford; costume design by Noelle Wedig; sound design by Doug Borntrager)
- 2012 Collapse by Allison Moore (directed by Jason Bruffy; scenic and lighting design by Andrew Hungerford; sound design by Doug Borntrager)
- 2010 Skin Tight by Gary Henderson (playwright) (directed by Drew Fracher; scenic and lighting design by Andrew Hungerford; sound design by Doug Borntrager)
- 2010 Angels in America: A Gay Fantasia on National Themes by Tony Kushner (Millennium Approaches directed by Brian Isaac Phillips and Perestroika directed by Drew Fracher; scenic and lighting design by Andrew Hungerford; sound design by Doug Borntrager; costume design by Susan Toy)
- 2010 Adding Machine: A Musical by Jason Loewith & Joshua Schmidt (directed by Michael Burnham, musical direction by Alan Patrick Kenney, scenic and lighting design by Andrew Hungerford, costumes by Susan Toy, sound design by Doug Borntrager)
- 2009 Sideways Stories From Wayside School by John Olive (directed by Jason Ballweber of Four Humors Theatre in Minneapolis; scenic design by Andrew Hungerford; lighting design by Josh Mansker; costume design by Susan Toy; sound design by Doug Borntrager)
- 2009 Eurydice by Sarah Ruhl (directed by Jason Bruffy; scenic and lighting design by Sean Savoie; sound design by Doug Borntrager)
- 2008 Militant Language: A Play With Sand by Sean Christopher Lewis (World Premiere. Directed by Jason Bruffy; scenic and lighting design by Andrew Hungerford; sound design by Doug Borntrager)
- 2008 Bare: A Pop Opera by Jon Hartmere Jr. & Damon Intrabartolo (directed by Jason Bruffy; scenic and lighting design by Andrew Hungerford; sound design by Doug Borntrager)
- 2007 Topdog/Underdog by Suzan-Lori Parks (directed by Richard Hess; scenic and lighting design by Andrew Hungerford; sound design by Doug Borntrager)
- 2006 See What I Wanna See by Michael John LaChiusa (Regional Premiere, first production after off-Broadway) (directed by Jason Bruffy)
- 2006 In the Blood by Suzan-Lori Parks (First production at new home on Jackson Street)
- 2005 Tick, Tick... Boom! by Jonathan Larson
- 2003 Corpus Christi by Terrence McNally (Heavily protested by religious groups, put Know Theatre on the map)
- 2000 In Rebel Country by Kevin Barry
