= Emery Theatre =

Theater in Cincinnati, Ohio, United States

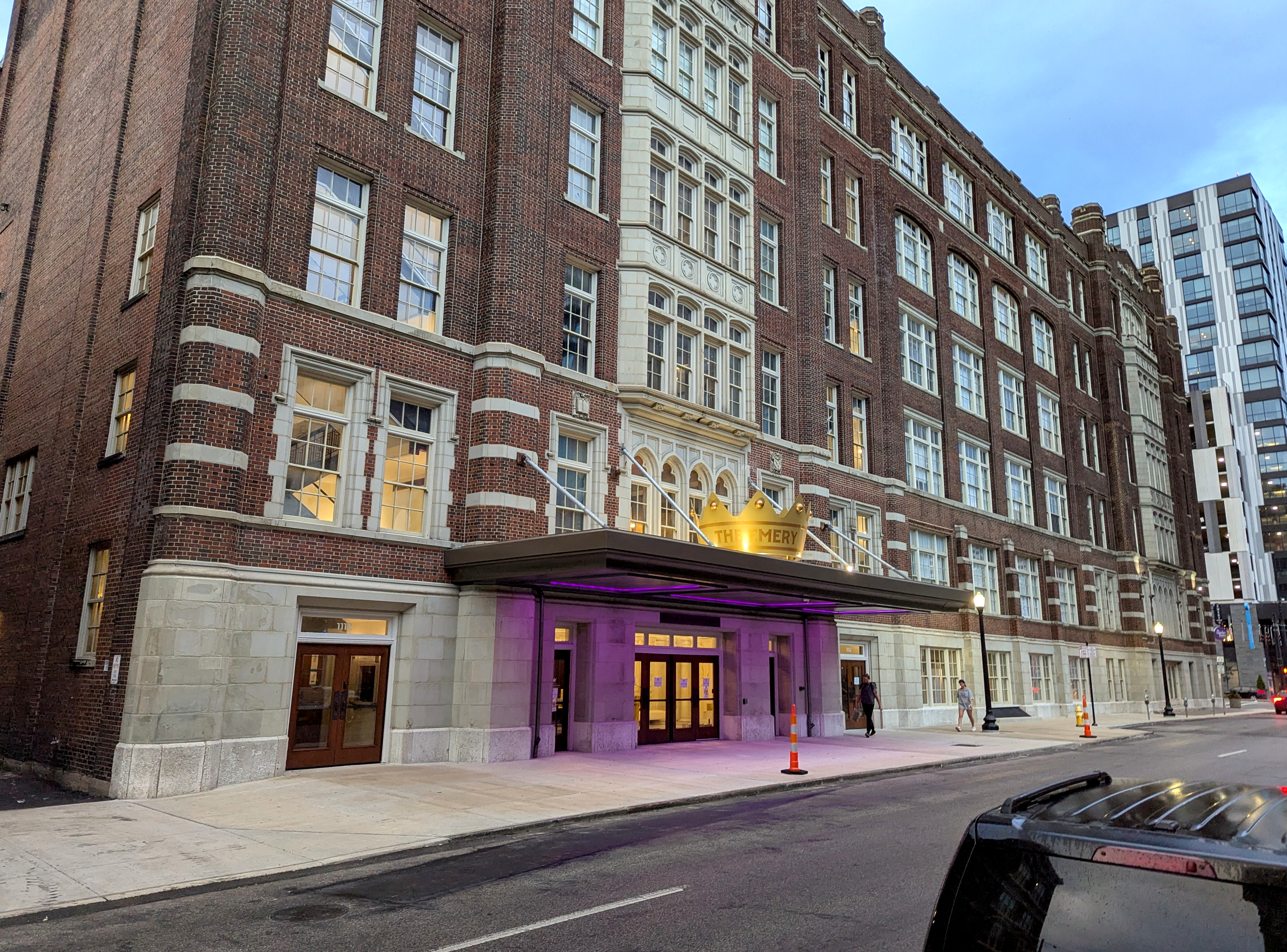
The theatre's entrance after 2025 renovations

The Emery Theatre, or Emery Auditorium, is a historic, acoustically exceptional theater located in the Over-the-Rhine neighborhood of Cincinnati, Ohio. The building was constructed in 1911 as the home for a trade school (the Ohio Mechanics Institute), but its large auditorium was intended for public use. The design of the Emery Theatre is based on the "isacoustic curve" principles that were first proposed by John Scott Russell. The theatre was built with two balconies and a total of 2,211 seats. It was one of the first concert halls in the United States to have no obstructed seats.

The Emery was the home of the Cincinnati Symphony Orchestra, who performed there from January 6, 1912 until 1936 when they moved to the larger Music Hall. The quality of acoustics in the Emery Theatre is legendary. The famous conductor Leopold Stokowski compared its acoustics to that of Carnegie Hall in New York City.

Many world-renowned performing artists and Broadway stars have appeared at the Emery, including George Gershwin, John Philip Sousa, Bette Davis, Arturo Toscanini, Fritz Reiner, Katharine Cornell, and Russian ballet dancers Nijinsky and Anna Pavlova. Gershwin performed Rhapsody in Blue there with the Cincinnati Symphony Orchestra shortly after premiering it in New York City.

Venue	Seating
Music Hall	3,400
Aronoff Center	2,700
Taft Theatre	2,400
Emery Theatre	~1,600
Corbett Auditorium	900
Memorial Hall	610

The Emery Theatre fell into disuse around the turn of the 21st century, but historic restoration began early 2024 by The Children's Theater of Cincinnati. The restoration of the theatre will allow seating for approximately 1,600 guests including combining the segregated levels and making the theater ADA accessible for artist and viewer alike.

== History ==
Emery Theatre Cincinnati

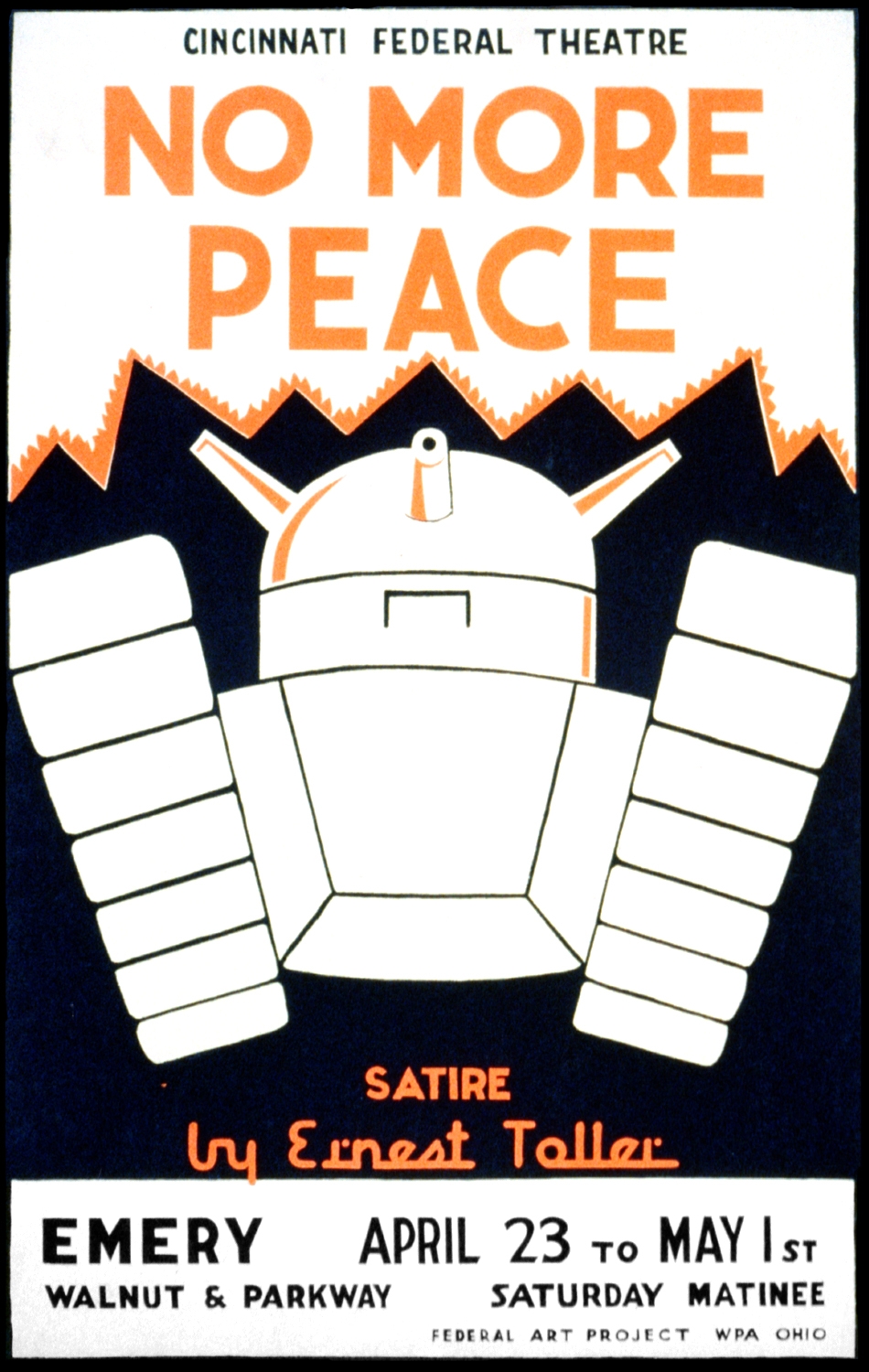
Poster for the Cincinnati Federal Theatre production of Ernst Toller's No More Peace at the Emery Theatre (1936)

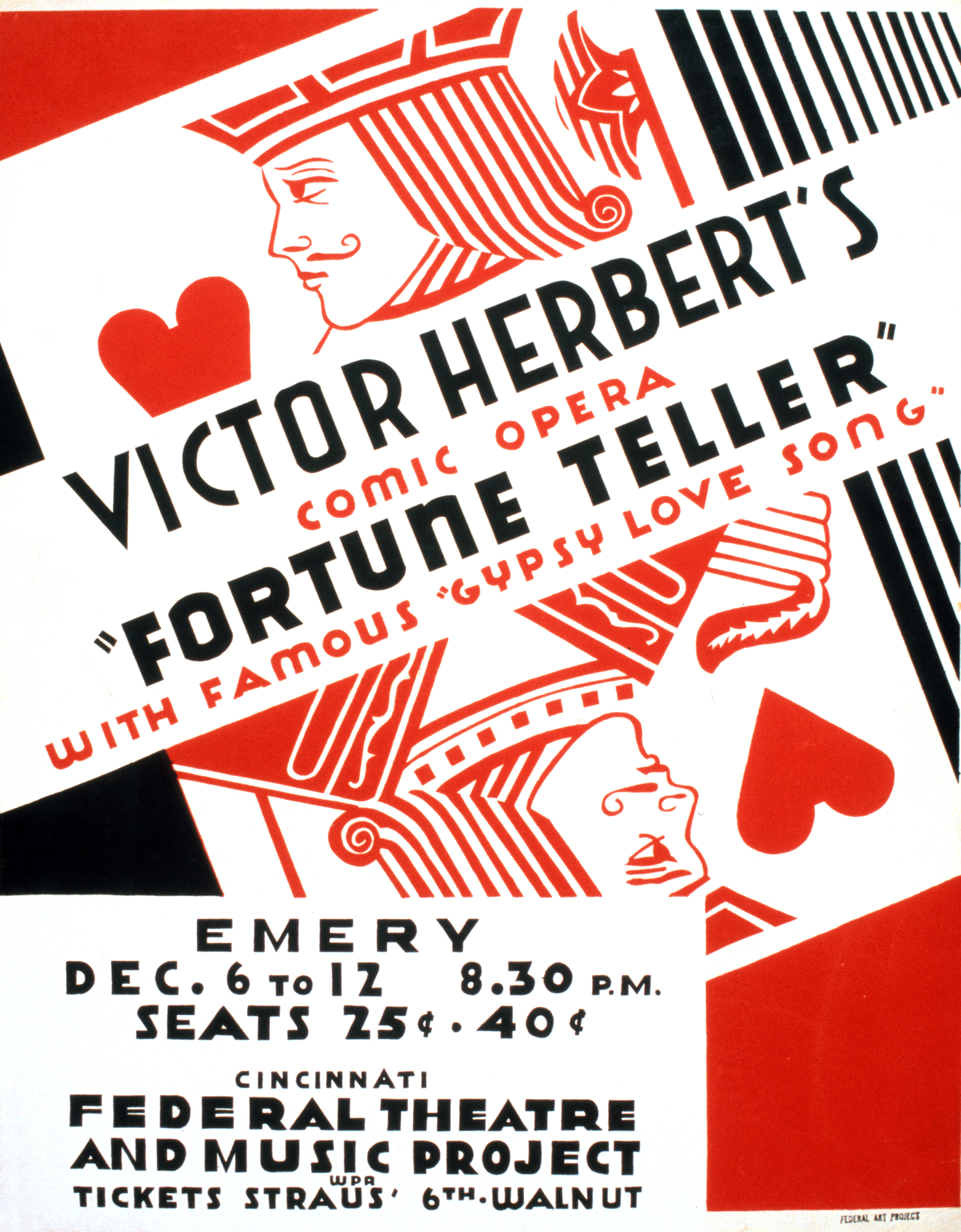
Poster for the Federal Theatre Project and Federal Music Project production of The Fortune Teller at the Emery Theatre (1936)

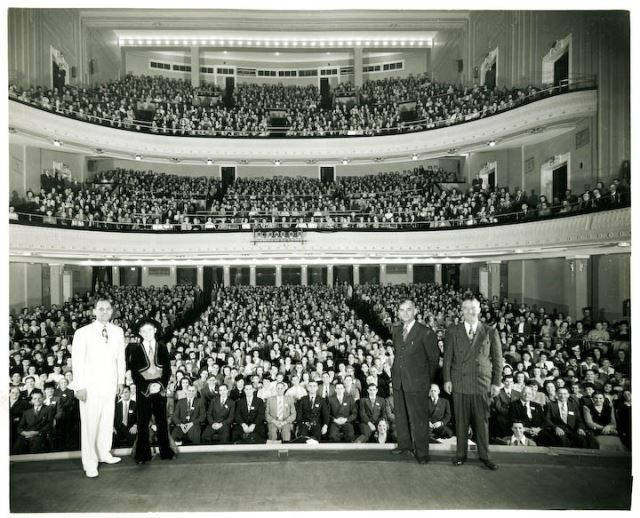
Photo of an attentive Emery crowd in the 1940s

The Emery Theatre was the third in a series of four theatre-style concert halls whose design was derived from Adler and Sullivan's Auditorium Theatre in Chicago, and that were specifically built for the symphony orchestras of their respective cities. The four halls were Carnegie Hall in New York City (1892), Orchestra Hall in Chicago (1904), Emery Auditorium in Cincinnati (1911), and Orchestra Hall in Detroit (1919). Unlike its three sister halls, the Emery Theatre is not freestanding, but is part of a school building. The school was the Ohio Mechanics Institute (OMI), now known as the Ohio College of Applied Science.

By the early 1900s, the OMI's need for a new and larger building was imperative. Preliminary plans were first made public in a promotional brochure, which appeared in the spring of 1906. This brochure showed a four-story building with a small stage, limited backstage facilities, and seating capacity of 1,280, which would have precluded its use by any large-scale theatrical or concert productions. However, outside influence was soon felt in the form of Mrs. Mary M. Emery's philanthropy.

Initially, Mrs. Emery offered to fund only part of the project, but OMI Superintendent John L. Shearer induced her to take on the entire cost of the project and make the whole building a memorial to her husband. Mrs. Emery only asked that the auditorium be "so constructed as to be serviceable for public and private lectures, entertainments, symphony and other concerts. May Festival rehearsals, and for such other entertainment as in the judgement of the Trustees of your institution may be proper." She avoided mention of the Cincinnati Symphony Orchestra, which she hoped would be the new hall's main tenant.

Thanks to new management and a need for a smaller concert hall, the CSO eventually made Emery Theatre its home. The original plan for 1,500 seats would not, however, be enough. A second balcony was added, and the final design helped to make the Emery the first concert hall in the United States to have no obstructed seats.

== Design ==
Adler's design helped the structural engineer Harvey Hannaford, Jr, grandson and partner in Samuel Hannaford and Sons, with the design problems of the Emery Auditorium. Adler used the principle of the "isacoustic curve" first described by John Scott Russell in 1836 not only to calculate the best placement of the Auditorium's main floor and its three balconies, but also to design a series of terraced ellipses that form the ceiling in the front part of the hall. These ellipses helped direct sound evenly throughout the hall. They serve the added function of lessening the overall volume so sound in this large hall is not boomy or cavernous but still resonant, especially for the audience in the second and third balconies.

The final 1911 Emery Auditorium design is derived from the 1909 design. Hannaford made the ellipse shallower, shifted the three coffered ceiling segments toward the stage, and added in the back of the hall a smooth ceiling which is rounded in the front. The ellipse was now the same as Music Hall's ellipse.

The two massive balconies are the most wonderful structural aspects of the 1911 design. Viewed from the stage, the balconies appear to be strung effortlessly between the walls of the hall. Their "secret" lies in two I-beams of structural steel, one for each balcony, over eighty-nine feet long and weighing thirty-three tons each, running the width of the hall. The balconies rest largely on these beams. The beam for the second balcony is tied directly into the back pair of the hall's four main support columns. The anchorage for the lower balcony's beam is less obvious. It appears to float above the main floor because it enters the walls immediately above two sets of exit doors. Actually, it is riveted at both ends into plate girders that span the doors like lintels, and which are in turn attached to the support columns. These plate girders are completely covered over by masonry. An intricate system of cantilever trusses extends out from these I-beams to form the front part of the balconies. This method of balcony construction was relatively new in 1910 and had, to the author's knowledge, never been used in a concert hall in the United States prior to the Emery Auditorium. Its use in two balconies adds further precedent to the Emery's design.

In regard to acoustics, Leopold Stokowski commented on the hall's excellent combination of clarity and blend, and the effective increase in the orchestra's power. Individual instrumental colors could now be heard with greater resolution because of the greater logistical intimacy between audience and orchestra, and because the hall's shape and dimensions created a less diffuse sound, while at the same time creating resonance which blended the clearer, more powerful sound into a well-balanced whole. Unfortunately, we have no record of the Cincinnati Symphony Orchestra's sound in the Emery, as they made no commercial recordings and no radio broadcast transcription disks are known to exist from the period the orchestra performed there.

== Timeline of ownership ==
1911 — Theatre built as part of the Ohio Mechanics Institute trade school building.

1969 —The University of Cincinnati gains ownership of the building that houses both the Emery Theatre and the Emery Center Apartments after OMI-CAS (Ohio College of Applied Science) becomes incorporated into UC.

1977–1999 —The American Theatre Organ Society managed the theatre and reduced the seating capacity to 1,360 by closing the second balcony to the public. During this period, silent, sound, and 3D films were shown during the weekends, and organ concerts were performed several times each year.

1988 —OMI-CAS moves to Edgecliff Campus, and the non-theatre classroom portion of the building sits vacant. The University of Cincinnati remains the owner of the building.

1988 —The non-profit Emery Center Corporation (ECC) is created to promote the restoration and sustainable operation of the Emery Theatre. The ECC still maintains the lease for the auditorium portion of the building today.

2001— The Emery Center Apartments Limited Partnership (ECALP) leases the building (excluding the theatre) from UC in order to redevelop the building into market-rate rental apartments and commercial spaces. The theatre portion of the building remains in need of major renovation and continues to be unused.

2023— On December 22, 2023 TCT officially purchased the Emery Theater with construction currently underway, breathing new life into the Emery, preserving its rich history while ushering in a new era. As the oldest professional theatre for young audiences in the country, The Children's Theatre of Cincinnati has created lifelong memories for children and families for more than a century. The Taft Theatre has been home to TCT’s MainStage productions for 52 years but comes with challenges. TCT has explored several other space options, but ultimately all roads lead back to our original performance home – The Emery Theater. $50 million has been raised to date including Federal Historic and New Markets Tax Credits allocations.

2025— The first performance at the Emery in years will take place in Oct. 2025 with a production of the Wizard of Oz by The Children's Theatre of Cincinnati.

- October 10–26, 2025 – The first production in the newly renovated Emery Theater will be The Wizard of Oz, presented by The Children’s Theatre of Cincinnati. The choice marks the 100-year anniversary of the 1925 performance at the venue.
- 2025 Renovation Features –
  - Installation of a 20-foot-square turntable lift with trapdoor, the largest and first of its kind in the United States.
  - Excavation of approximately 16 feet beneath the basement to accommodate the lift.
  - Advanced stage technology making the Emery “the most technologically advanced proscenium-style theater in the U.S.,” according to theater infrastructure experts.
  - Acoustic adjustments made to improve sound for theater audiences, while preserving the ability to restore the original orchestral acoustics.
  - Installation of several new elevators to ensure full accessibility.
- Renovation Discoveries –
  - Discovery of a dry cistern well beneath the orchestra level.
  - Uncovering of a historic rolling pocket door, signed by construction crews as a hidden “time capsule” before being re-sealed.
- Historic Significance –
  - Celebrated for its near-perfect acoustics and unobstructed sight lines.

== Recent community use of the theatre ==
Despite the theatre's condition, temporary occupancy permits have been obtained over the past several years to allow the following activities:

- In November 2008, the Cincinnati Entertainment Awards were held at the Emery.
- In the summer of 2009, the Emery Theatre hosted Emery Jam, a fundraiser featuring local bands. Proceeds were used to help fund Give Back Cincinnati's annual trip to help rebuild New Orleans.
- In 2010, the Emery Theatre became a stop on the historical Civil War walking tour.
- From November 2011 to November 2012, the non-profit Requiem Project programmed several shows and hosted recording sessions at the Emery. These included performances by The National, Bill Frisell, Dirty Projectors, and Ralph Stanley. In November 2012 the Emery hosted the premiere of the documentary film I Send You This Place (by Andrea Sisson and Pete Ohs). It also hosted the Cincinnati Film Festival and the Cincinnati Fringe Festival. Additionally, in collaboration with the Cincinnati Contemporary Art Center, the Emery hosted 13 Most Beautiful Songs for Andy Warhol's Screen Tests performed by Dean & Britta. Rock-n-roll photographer Michael Wilson documented musical performances at the theatre, in a series of single-take (one-shot), high-fidelity music videos, under the rubric "The Emery Sessions", with audio recording by Cameron Cochran, audio mixing by Henry Wilson, and titles and digital juju by Matthew Davis. Sessions were filmed with Over The Rhine, Ralph Stanley, Daniel Martin Moore, The Comet Bluegrass All-Stars, and others. All the Emery Session videos are available online via YouTube.

== Past revival efforts ==
- In 1988, the non-profit Emery Center Corporation (ECC) was created to promote the restoration and sustainable operation of the Emery Theatre.
- In 1988, Stanley Aronoff, a Cincinnati politician, secured $4.5 million. However, facing other priorities, Aronoff helped the University of Cincinnati use $3.2 million for the building that houses the College of Design, Architecture, Art and Planning and $1.4 million for renovation of French Hall for University College. Only $400,000 of the appropriation went to planning for the Emery's restoration.
- In 1989, the Contemporary Art Center considered moving to the Emery.
- In 1997, the University of Cincinnati partnered with the Cincinnati Preservation Association to begin drawing plans for renovation. Three years later, they attempted to raise $17.5 million to restore the Emery by 2004, but they were unfortunately unable to allocate the initial $5 million needed from state government and the plan did not move forward.
- In 2001, the University of Cincinnati successfully completed a $10 million redevelopment of the non-theatre part of the building (former classroom space) into contemporary residential apartments. The complex now contains 59 units of market-rate housing, interior parking, and commercial office and retail space. Once the construction loans begin to be paid off, revenue from the apartments will be used for renovation and operation of the theatre.
- In 2008, a group of over 100 local volunteers from Give Back Cincinnati spends a day cleaning up the dusty theatre. Give Back Cincinnati volunteers returned in 2009 to continue restoration of the theater, cleaning the lower balcony and painting much of the first floor and backstage area.
- In 2010 the ECC applied for a $1 million appropriation from the Ohio Capital Improvement Budget, but other community investments throughout the state were deemed a higher priority at the time.
- In 2011 the ECC procured the necessary architectural plans for future renovation from John Senhauser Architects.
- From 2011 to 2013 the ECC had a management agreement with the non-profit Requiem Project. Substantial event programming during this time was possible under a temporary occupancy permit. However, this effort did not ultimately involve capital fund raising for long-term renovation.
- In 2016, the building's owner, The University of Cincinnati, began studying a possible sale. A sale raises the possibility of the theater being renovated and reopened by another party.

== Current state ==
The theatre is not currently used, as significant funding and renovations would be required for an occupancy permit. The non-profit Emery Center Corporation (ECC), formed in 1989, holds the sublease to the theatre. In May 2019, a study commissioned by the University of Cincinnati concluded that the Emery Theater was beyond repair. UC's board of trustees voted to market and sell the building.

In 2023 the building has begun purchase processes by The Children's Theatre of Cincinnati. The acquisition was completed at the end of the year, and renovations started in February 2024. Estimated completion is fall 2025. The planned cost is around $43 million.
