= Ensemble Theatre (disambiguation) =

Ensemble Theatre can refer to:

- The Ensemble Theatre, an American theatre company in Houston, Texas, U.S.
- The Ensemble Theatre, an Australian theatre company in Sydney, Australia
- Ensemble Theatre Cincinnati, an American theatre company in Cincinnati, Ohio
