= Cincinnati Film Festival =

Yearly film festival in Ohio, U.S.

- Status: Active
- Genre: film festivals
- Frequency: Annually
- Locations: Cincinnati, Ohio
- Country: United States
- Years active: 15–16
- Inaugurated: 2010
- Website: www.cindependentfilmfest.org

The Cincinnati Film Festival is a yearly cultural event and international film competition held in Cincinnati, Ohio, supporting surrounding tri-state region. Since 2010, the all-volunteer staff had screened over 1000 submitted films from 36 countries.

== History ==
- The 2010 event was a collaborative event with the former Oxford International Film Festival, screened over 100 films and was held over 9 days in 11 venues across the Ohio, Kentucky and Indiana tri-state region. Held October 8–16, 2010, submissions were sent in from 31 countries.
- The 2011 festival scaled back to 90 films over 4 days, September 29 - October 2, 2011 and held in downtown Cincinnati, during the first official "Film in Cincinnati Week".
- The 2012 festival screened over 100 films September 6–13, 2012 at the Esquire Theatre, Clifton Performance Theatre, and Clifton Cultural Arts Center in the Clifton area, St. Michael the Archangel Church in Lower Price Hill, Cincinnati, the Public Library of Cincinnati and Hamilton County and the Emery Theatre in the Over-the-Rhine district of Cincinnati. Screening events earlier that year also took place at the Cincinnati Art Museum.
- In 2015, The CFF brought on award-winning screenwriter and Founder of Screenwriting Staffing, Jacob N. Stuart, to quarterback their Screenplay Contest.

== Culture ==
The Cincinnati Film Festival includes several question and answer sessions, panels and filmmaker workshops led by industry professionals, as well as hosting a bi-monthly podcast, the CindePodcast, created and hosted by Jonny Shenk. The podcast focuses on spotlighting various filmmakers in their respective departments as they navigate a Post-Covid filmmaking culture.

== Partners ==
The CFF is also a Community Cinema partner, bringing the Independent Television Service films broadcast on Independent Lens. It also runs the Cincinnati leg of the international competition, the 48 Hour Film Project.
