= Philippus United Church of Christ =

Church in Cincinnati, Ohio

Coordinates: 39°07′07″N 84°31′08″W

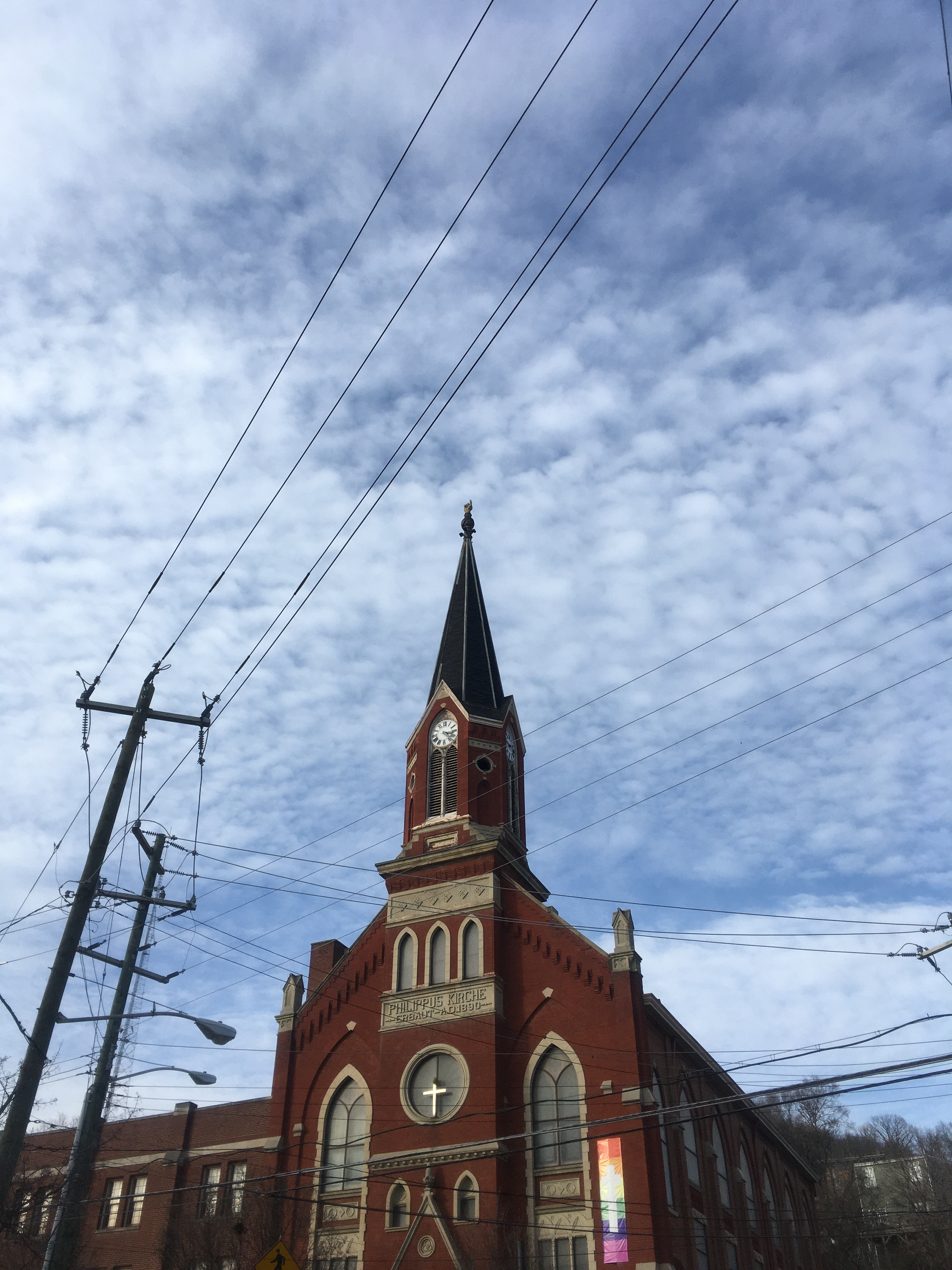
Philippus United Church of Christ

Philippus United Church of Christ is located on the northwest corner of West McMicken and Ohio Avenues, in the Over-the-Rhine neighborhood, in Cincinnati, Ohio. The church is a landmark because of a gilded hand, with its index finger pointing to the heavens, on its tall steeple. The church is an outgrowth of the now-defunct St. Matthews German Evangelical Church at Elm and Liberty Streets, which was a stronghold of "Free" Protestantism. Free Protestantism was very strong in Cincinnati at that particular time. Philippus Church is a red brick church completed in 1891. The church features Gothic Revival-style details. Recessed pointed-arch windows flank the gabled pointed-arch entrance and projecting tower with its rose window. Membership was large from the beginning.

For many years Philippus Kirche ministered to Cincinnati's German immigrants and their families under the direction of the Rev. Dr. Pister. All services were conducted in German until 1921. Following the union of the Evangelical and Reformed Church in 1934, Philippus Kirche assumed the name Philippus Evangelical and Reformed Church. Since 1957 the church has been an active part of the United Church of Christ denomination, the successor to the E&R Church. The Rev. Cherie Hambleton left Philippus UCC in 2013, and the Rev. Sam Wyatt was the next pastor.

In December 2021 City Church OTR bought the Philippus church building.
