= Cincinnati Shakespeare Company =

American ensemble theater

- Interactive map of Cincinnati Shakespeare Company
- Address: 1195 Elm Street; Cincinnati; United States
- Coordinates: 39°6′44.61″N 84°30′42.45″W
- Event: Theatre

Construction
- Opened: 1993; 33 years ago

Website
- cincyshakes.com

Cincinnati Shakespeare Company is a professional ensemble theater located in downtown Cincinnati, Ohio, focusing on Shakespearean and other classical works.

== History ==
Cincinnati Shakespeare Company originally was incorporated under the name Fahrenheit Theatre Company. Beginning with a small grant in 1993, a group of young theater artists founded the FTC with the mission of producing Shakespeare and the classics for modern audiences. FTC's first production was "The Mourning Dove" by Ken Kawaji, performed at BaseArt Gallery. The company then produced a full season of five plays in various local venues, beginning with Shakespeare’s The Taming of the Shrew at Gabriel’s Corner in Over-the-Rhine.

== Staff ==
Cincinnati Shakespeare Company is currently led by producing artistic director, Brian Isaac Phillips. As of 2015 the company employed 46 artists: a company of 27 professional actors and stage managers (including 17 members of Actor’s Equity), 14 professional directors, designers, and technicians, and six arts administration professionals with and operating budget of almost $1.5 million.

== Completing the Canon ==
In 2014, with their production of The Two Noble Kinsmen, Cincinnati Shakespeare Company became one of the first 5 theaters in the United States to complete the canon.

=== First performance of each play ===
- The Taming of the Shrew - 1995/96 Season
- Twelfth Night - 1995/96 Season
- Julius Caesar - 1995/96 Season
- As You Like It - 1996/97 Season
- Macbeth - 1996/97 Season
- The Merchant of Venice - 1996/97 Season
- Henry V - 1997/98 Season
- Romeo and Juliet - 1997/98 Season
- Love’s Labour’s Lost - 1997/98 Season
- Measure for Measure - 1997/98 Season
- Julius Caesar - 1998/99 Season
- Hamlet - 1998/99 Season
- Othello - 1998/99 Season
- Much Ado About Nothing - 1998/99 Season
- King Lear - 1999/2000 Season
- The Wars of the Roses - 1999/2000 Season
- A Midsummer Night’s Dream - 1999/2000 Season
- Richard III - 1999/2000 Season
- The Two Gentlemen of Verona - 1999/2000 Season
- The Tempest - 2000/01 Season
- The Comedy of Errors - 2000/01 Season
- Coriolanus - 2000/01 Season
- Merry Wives of Windsor - 2001/02 Season
- Henry IV, Part 1 and Henry IV Part 2, The Heart of a Man - 2001/02 Season
- Pericles - 2004/05 Season
- Troilus and Cressida - 2005/06 Season
- Titus Andronicus - 2006/07 Season
- Antony and Cleopatra - 2006/07 Season
- The Winter’s Tale - 2006/07 Season
- Cymbeline - 2007/08 Season
- Timon of Athens - 2008/09 Season
- All's Well That Ends Well - 2009/10 Season
- The Life and Death of King John - 2010/11 Season
- Henry VIII: All Is True - 2011/12 Season
- Richard II - 2012/13 Season
- The Two Noble Kinsmen - 2013/14 Season

== World premieres ==
- The Rewards of Being Frank by Alice Scovell (2022)
- Gaslight by Steven Dietz (2023)
- Wrecking Ball by Zina Camblin (2023)
- A Room in the Castle by Lauren Gunderson (2025)
- Mrs. Dalloway: A New Musical book, music and lyrics by Lindsey Augusta-Mercer
