= Feli from Germany =

German-American YouTuber and podcaster

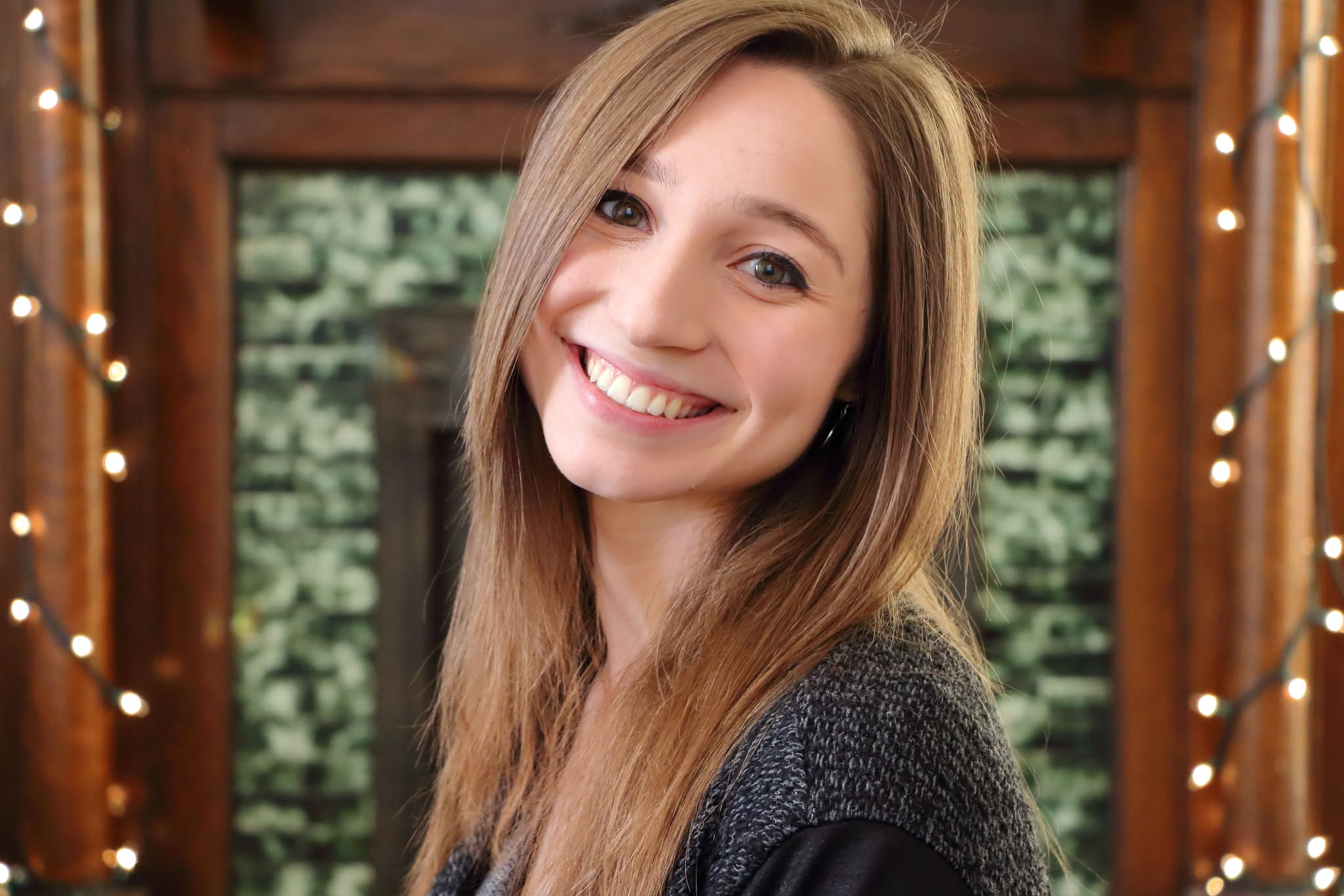
- Felicia Hofner (2024)
- Born: Felicia Hofner; Munich, Germany
- Citizenship: Germany; United States (since 2024)
- Education: LMU Munich (BA); University of Cincinnati (MA)
- Occupations: YouTuber; podcaster

YouTube information
- Channel: Feli from Germany
- Years active: 2018–present
- Subscribers: 744,000
- Views: 165 million
- Last updated: October 10, 2026
- Website: felifromgermany.com

Felicia Hofner, known online as Feli from Germany, is a German-American YouTuber and podcaster, focused on cultural differences between America and Germany. She also co-hosts a podcast "Understanding Train Station" with an American friend who lives in Germany.

== Early life ==
Hofner grew up in Munich, Germany. She first visited the United States as part of a two-week sister city student exchange program at a Cincinnati, Ohio high school in 2010. While attending LMU Munich, she worked three jobs in media and radio. She returned to Cincinnati again in 2016 as part of a study abroad program in electronic media at University of Cincinnati. She chose UC over a program in Washington, DC because it was free, like most universities in Germany, and fit her interest in audio and video production. She took an internship the following summer, and then began a master's degree in German studies at UC. She hosted an event for the Over-the-Rhine museum in 2017 to gather photographs, receipts, and restaurant menus from residents to scan into a digital collection to help guide research about the neighborhood.

== YouTuber ==
Hofner started her YouTube channel, "German Girl in America", originally as a hobby in 2018, because she would frequently talk with family and friends about cultural differences between the two countries. Her audience was mostly American at first, but later grew more in Germany. She took up her YouTube career full-time in 2020, and uses it to educate viewers on German and American culture. Her YouTube channel name was changed to "Feli from Germany" in October 2021 due to a trademark dispute. Her channel had 380,000 subscribers by October 2022 and had grown to 682,000 by March 2025, along with audiences on Instagram, TikTok, and Facebook.

She was interviewed by Süddeutsche Zeitung in May 2020 about her life and experiences in America. She visited the German Embassy in Washington, D.C. in 2022 to talk about the city's German roots. She started hosting group trips to Austria, the Czech Republic, and Germany in 2023, with a third trip to take place in December 2025. She was interviewed by German radio station Ego FM in March 2024 about the upcoming US presidential election.

She also worked with the German embassy again in 2025, and with DAZN to discuss Cincinnati's German history ahead of the 2025 FIFA Club World Cup, as well as with FC Cincinnati and FC Bayern Munich on other intercultural projects. Salon.com reported in 2026 about her YouTube video introducing the ubiquitous German practice of house burping (German: lüften). She expressed amusement that it is considered normal in Germany, but seen as a new trend in the United States, and noted that many German leases require tenants to air out their residence periodically, and courts have also ordered it.

== Personal life ==
Hofner won the green card lottery in 2018, which granted her permanent residency in the United States, and she became a naturalized US citizen in 2024. She got married in 2025 and moved back to Munich.
