= Bockfest =

Annual beer festival in Cincinnati, Ohio

- Status: active
- Genre: festivals
- Frequency: Annually, first full weekend of March
- Venue: Over-the-Rhine
- Location: Cincinnati
- Country: United States
- Website: www.bockfest.com

Bockfest is an annual beer festival held in Over-the-Rhine, Cincinnati, Ohio on the first full weekend of March. It is the oldest German-style bock beer festival in the United States. It drew an estimated 20,000 attendees in 2013 and 30,000 in 2014. Bockfest originated from the 1992 special release of a beer by Hudepohl Brewing Company. Hudepohl released a bock beer under the name of the Christian Moerlein Brewing Company, the largest pre-prohibition brewery in Cincinnati. Bockfest is a celebration of bock beer, Cincinnati's brewing heritage, the Over-the-Rhine neighborhood, and the coming of Spring.

== Precipitation Retaliation ==
During the 2008 Bockfest a huge snowstorm nearly rendered the festival closed. The parade was officially called off because of the snow emergency, but many groups decided to walk the empty, snow-covered streets anyway. With beer already purchased and arrangements made, Bockfest continued despite poor attendance. Each year since that year there has been an event called the "Precipitation Retaliation". Participants gather around and burn a snowman effigy at Northern Row Brewery and Distillery. Organizers claim responsibility for good weather in each subsequent year.

== Bockfest Parade ==
Bockfest officially begins each year with a parade starting at Arnold's Bar and Grill in Downtown Cincinnati. The parade moves north into Over-the-Rhine and finishes near Old St. Mary's Church at 13th and Main. The parade is led by a goat pulling a miniature keg of the Christian Moerlein Emancipator Doppelbock which is then ceremoniously tapped once the parade ends. The parade is popular for its short length and unique floats.

== Bockfest 5K ==
Since 2013 there has been a race called the "Bockfest 5K" that runs through Over-the-Rhine and Downtown on the Saturday morning of Bockfest. It is a part of the Christian Moerlein Beer Series of races organized by the Flying Pig Marathon in conjunction with the Hudy 14K & 7K Brewery Run and the Little Kings Mile.

== Sausage Queen Competition ==
In addition to the various events held at Bockfest hall during the festival, each year a "Sausage Queen" is crowned. The Sausage Queen Competition is a gender-neutral competition that is meant to raise awareness for Bockfest and provide a light-hearted competition among those outgoing enough to compete. The rules are pretty simple in that contestants must love beer and sausage. Contestants participate in preliminary rounds where one finalist is announced at each participating bar in the weeks leading up to Bockfest. Each contestant then represents his or her bar in the finals. The winner is chosen through a question-and-answer round and a talent round through a panel of judges on Saturday night of Bockfest. The Sausage Queen leads the following year's Bockfest parade.
