= Salem United Church of Christ =

Historic church in Ohio, United States

- U.S. Historic district – Contributing property
- Location within Ohio Location within the United States
- Location: 1425 Sycamore St., Cincinnati, Ohio
- Coordinates: 39°6′44″N 84°30′40″W
- Built: 1867
- Part of: Over-the-Rhine Historic District (ID83001985)

The Salem United Church of Christ, known in previous generations as the Salem German Evangelical Reformed Church or Deutsche Evangelisch Reformierte Salems Kirche, is located at 1425 Sycamore Street in the Over-the-Rhine neighborhood of Cincinnati, Ohio. The church holds membership in the United Church of Christ, the successor to the German Reformed tradition.

This church was constructed in 1867 and services were held in German until the 1930s. The former German name of this church is engraved over the front door on Sycamore Street.

The church has been the home to Gabriel's Corner and Know Theatre of Cincinnati.

Salem United Church of Christ is a contributing property to the Over-the-Rhine Historic District, which was listed on the National Register of Historic Places in 1983.
