= American Classical Music Hall of Fame and Museum =

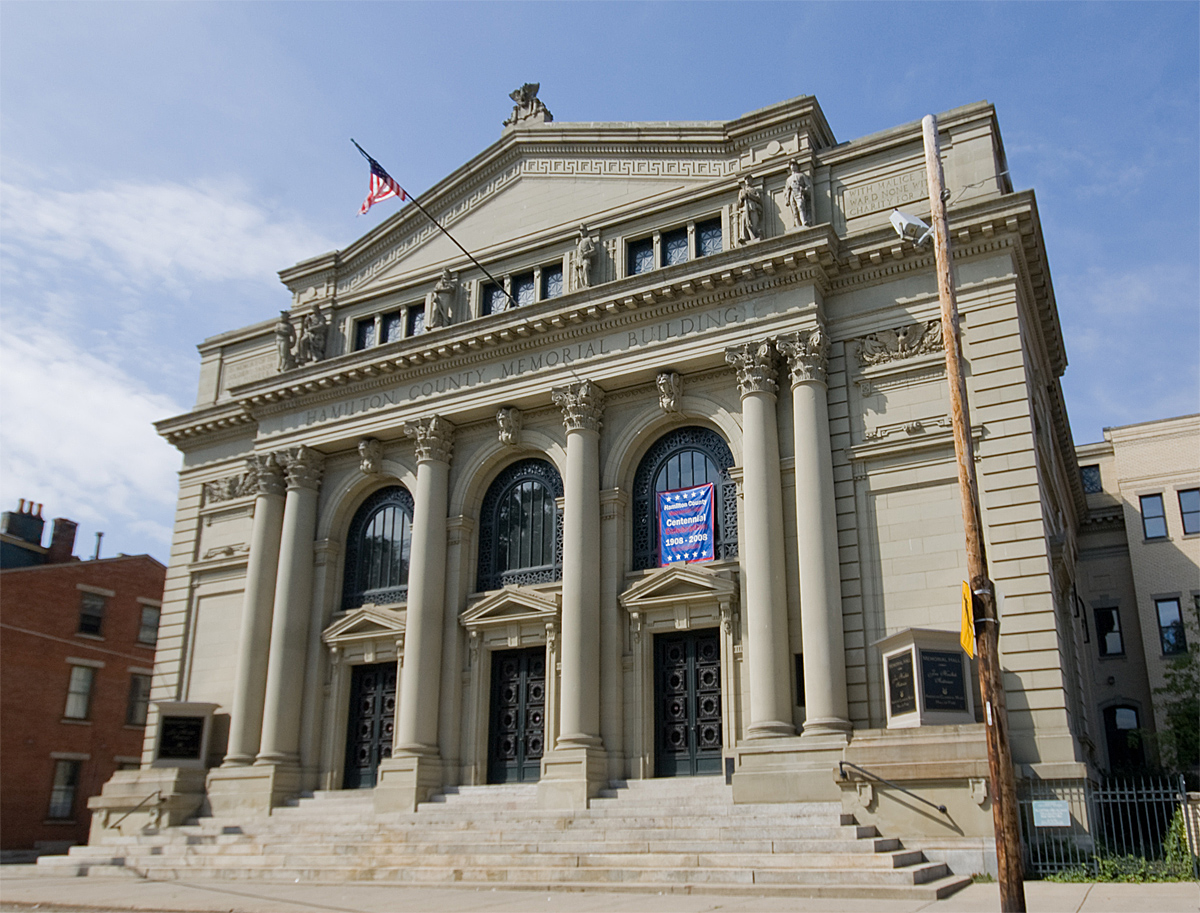
- The Hamilton County Memorial Building which houses the organization's offices and exhibits
- Established: 1996
- Location: 1225 Elm Street, Cincinnati, Ohio
- Coordinates: 39.108587°N 84.518509°W
- Type: Classical music museum
- Director: Nina Perlove (Executive Director)
- Website: classicalwalkoffame.org

The American Classical Music Hall of Fame and Museum is a non-profit organization celebrating past and present individuals and institutions that have made significant contributions to classical music—"people who have contributed to American music and music in America", according to Samuel Adler (co-chairman of the organization's first artistic directorate). The project was founded in 1996 by Cincinnati businessman and civic leader David A. Klingshirm and inducted its first honorees in 1998.

The organization's offices and exhibits are housed in the Hamilton County Memorial Building, next door to the Cincinnati Music Hall in the Over-the-Rhine neighborhood of Cincinnati, Ohio. The exhibits are not open to the public but are on view during some events at the School for Creative and Performing Arts in Cincinnati and via a virtual museum. "The Classical Walk of Fame", pavement stones engraved with names of American Classical Music Hall of Fame inductees, was opened in Washington Park outside the steps of the Cincinnati Music Hall in 2012. A mobile app allows park visitors to read biographies of the inductees, listen to samples of their music, and view related pictures. They can also play classical music through a mobile jukebox which activates the park's "dancing fountain".

== Inductees ==
=== 1998 ===
- Marian Anderson
- Samuel Barber
- Leonard Bernstein
- Elliott Carter
- Aaron Copland
- Duke Ellington
- George Gershwin
- Howard Hanson
- Charles Ives
- Scott Joplin
- Serge Koussevitzky
- John Knowles Paine
- Leontyne Price
- Fritz Reiner
- Arnold Schoenberg
- Gunther Schuller
- Roger Sessions
- Robert Shaw
- Nicolas Slonimsky
- John Philip Sousa
- Isaac Stern
- Leopold Stokowski
- Igor Stravinsky
- Theodore Thomas
- Arturo Toscanini
- United States Marine Band

=== 1999 ===
- Milton Babbitt
- Béla Bartók
- Amy Beach
- George W. Chadwick
- Charles Tomlinson Griffes
- Jascha Heifetz
- H. Wiley Hitchcock
- Marilyn Horne
- Music Division of the Library of Congress
- Dimitri Mitropoulos
- Max Rudolf
- William Schuman
- William Grant Still
- Edgard Varèse
- William Warfield

=== 2000 ===
- Elizabeth Sprague Coolidge
- Leon Fleisher
- Edward MacDowell
- Metropolitan Opera
- Eugene Ormandy
- Walter Piston
- Rudolf Serkin
- Beverly Sills
- George Szell
- George Walker

=== 2001 ===
- William Billings
- Van Cliburn
- George Crumb
- Antonín Dvořák
- Frederick Fennell
- Arthur Fiedler
- Paul Hindemith
- Juilliard String Quartet
- New York Philharmonic
- Itzhak Perlman
- Sergei Rachmaninoff
- Virgil Thomson

=== 2002 ===
- John Cage
- Pablo Casals
- Cincinnati Symphony Orchestra
- Dorothy DeLay
- Lukas Foss
- Louis Moreau Gottschalk
- Handel and Haydn Society
- Lorin Maazel
- Gian Carlo Menotti
- Darius Milhaud
- Jessye Norman
- Artur Schnabel
- Leonard Slatkin

=== 2003 ===
- Boston Symphony Orchestra
- Dave Brubeck
- Morton Gould
- James Levine
- Steinway & Sons

=== 2004 ===
- Gustav Mahler
- Zubin Mehta
- André Previn
- Michael Tilson Thomas
- Frederica Von Stade
- John Williams

=== 2006 ===
- Martin Bookspan

=== 2007 ===
- Cleveland Orchestra
- Yo-Yo Ma
- Donald Martino
- Harvey G. Phillips

=== 2008 ===
- Samuel Adler
- Chanticleer
- The Juilliard School
- Erich Kunzel
- Lowell Mason
- Risë Stevens

=== 2009 ===
- John Adams
- James Conlon
- League of American Orchestras
- Midori Gotō

=== 2010 ===
- BMI
- Marin Alsop
- Joseph W. Polisi
- William Bolcom
- ASCAP
- Emerson Quartet

=== 2011 ===
- Sir Georg Solti
- John Corigliano
- Philip Glass
- Gregor Piatigorsky
- Charles Wadsworth
- Chorus America
- Chicago Symphony Orchestra

=== 2012 ===
- Dale Warland
- Beaux Arts Trio
- Philadelphia Orchestra
- Nadia Boulanger
- Emanuel Ax
- Opera America
- Steve Reich
- David Zinman

=== 2013 ===
- Aaron Jay Kernis
- American Guild of Organists
- Guarneri Quartet
- Weston Noble
- André Watts

=== 2015 ===
- Henry Lewis
- Mormon Tabernacle Choir

=== 2017 ===
- Los Angeles Master Chorale
- Larry Rachleff
- Fisk Jubilee Singers
- Margaret Hillis
- Renee Fleming

=== 2018 ===
- Tanglewood Music Festival
- Westminster Choir College
- Ellen Taaffe Zwilich
- Apollo's Fire
- Ned Rorem
- Janos Starker
- Xian Zhang (conductor)

=== 2019 ===
- Henry Burleigh
- Sarah Caldwell
- Gary Graffman
- Adolph Herseth
- Interlochen Arts Academy
- Kronos Quartet
- LaSalle Quartet
- H. Robert Reynolds
- Michael Steinberg (music critic)
- Joan Tower
- Bruno Walter

=== 2020 ===
- Martina Arroyo
- Baldwin Piano Company
- Cincinnati Opera
- Paula Crider
- David Diamond (composer)
- Josef Gingold
- Gerre Hancock
- John Philip Sousa Band
- Libby Larsen
- Riccardo Muti
- Thomas Schippers
- St. Louis Symphony

== See also ==
- List of music museums
