= House burping =

Practice of briefly opening home windows

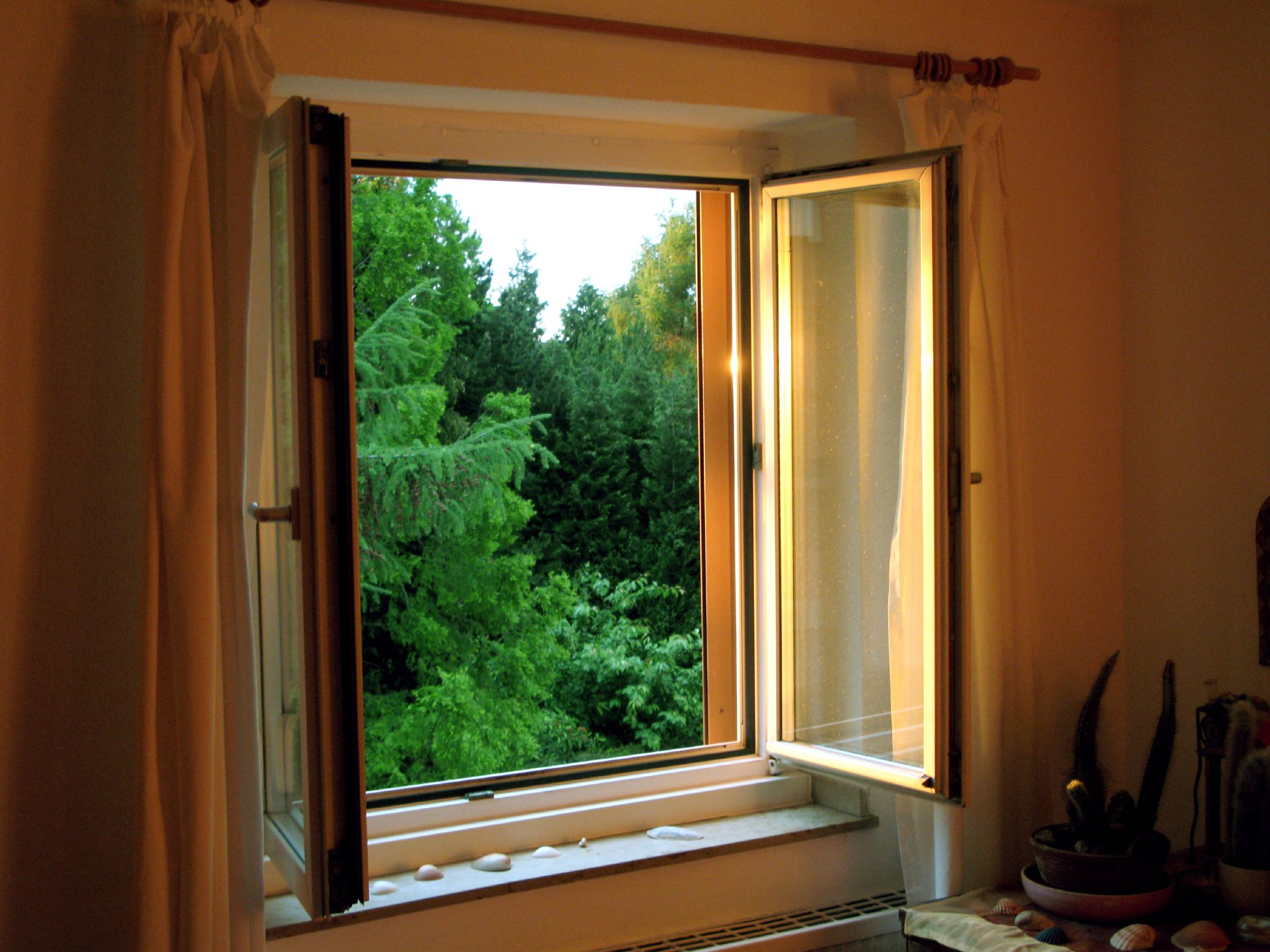
House burping

House burping is a term primarily used in the United States and on social media, for the practice of opening windows for a brief period in a home to exchange stale indoor air with fresh outdoor air. The practice is derived from the German tradition of lüften (lit. "airing"), a long-standing cultural norm of regular natural ventilation. House burping is promoted as a low-cost method to improve indoor air quality, reduce humidity, and limit mold growth, and it gained widespread online attention during the COVID-19 pandemic and in early 2026 through lifestyle media and social platforms such as TikTok.

== Definition ==
House burping refers to opening one or more windows, often on opposite sides of a dwelling. Usually it is for a short period, typically around ten minutes, once or multiple times per day although there is not a single consensus. The goal is to replace stagnant indoor air with outdoor air.

== Origins ==
The practice originates from the German concept of lüften (literally "ventilating" or "airing out"). In Germany, regular window ventilation is commonly taught in households and is sometimes stipulated in rental agreements, as tenants are expected to air out living spaces to prevent moisture buildup and mold.

== Cultural context ==
Unlike many modern North American homes, which are tightly sealed and rely heavily on mechanical heating, ventilation, and air conditioning (HVAC) systems, older European housing stock was designed with routine window ventilation in mind.

The term "house burping" emerged as it spread virally on social media in January 2026. YouTuber Feli from Germany made a video about the practice, noting it is a normal expectation in Germany, but a new trend in the United States.

== Health benefits ==
=== Indoor air quality ===
Indoor air can contain higher concentrations of carbon dioxide, volatile organic compounds (VOCs), particulate matter, and moisture than outdoor air. These pollutants may originate from cooking, cleaning products, furniture, building materials, pets, and human respiration. Natural ventilation through house burping is intended to dilute and remove these contaminants.

The United States Environmental Protection Agency has advised that opening windows can help lower indoor concentrations of VOCs, which are commonly emitted by household products such as paints, solvents, and cleaning agents.

=== Humidity and mold prevention ===
By allowing moist air to escape, house burping may help regulate indoor humidity levels and reduce conditions favorable to mold and mildew growth.

=== Cognitive and physical effects ===
Some researchers have suggested that elevated indoor carbon dioxide levels may be associated with symptoms such as fatigue, reduced concentration, and sleepiness. Proponents of house burping argue that frequent air exchange may support alertness, sleep quality, and overall comfort.

== Limitations and critiques ==
Experts note that house burping is not appropriate in all conditions. Opening windows may be inadvisable during periods of poor outdoor air quality, such as wildfire smoke events, high pollen counts, or heavy urban pollution. In hot, humid climates, prolonged window opening can increase indoor moisture and strain cooling systems.

== See also ==
- Mold and human health
- Sick building syndrome
- Ventilation (architecture)
