= Over-the-Rhine =

- Over-the-Rhine Historic District
- U.S. National Register of Historic Places
- U.S. Historic district
- Cincinnati Local Historic Landmark
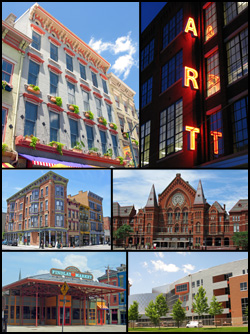
- From upper left: Italianate architecture, the Art Academy of Cincinnati, the OTR Gateway Quarter, Music Hall, Findlay Market, and the School for Creative and Performing Arts
- Interactive map of Over-the-Rhine Historic District
- Location: Bounded by Central Parkway to the south, Central Parkway to the west, Sycamore St. to the east, and Mulberry, W. Clifton & Klotter St. to Brighton Approach to the north.
- Coordinates: 39°6′47″N 84°30′58″W
- Area: 319 acres (1.29 km^{2})
- Architectural style: Greek Revival and Late Victorian
- NRHP reference No.: 83001985
- Added to NRHP: May 17, 1983

Over-the-Rhine, often abbreviated as OTR, is a residential neighborhood in the urban basin of Cincinnati, Ohio. Over-the-Rhine is among the largest, most intact urban historic districts in the United States. Originally settled by Ohio Rhinelanders (German: Ohio Rheinländer), the neighborhood became home to significant African-American and Appalachian populations during the mid-20th century. It is home to several of Cincinnati's most famous landmarks, including Cincinnati Music Hall and Findlay Market.

== Etymology ==
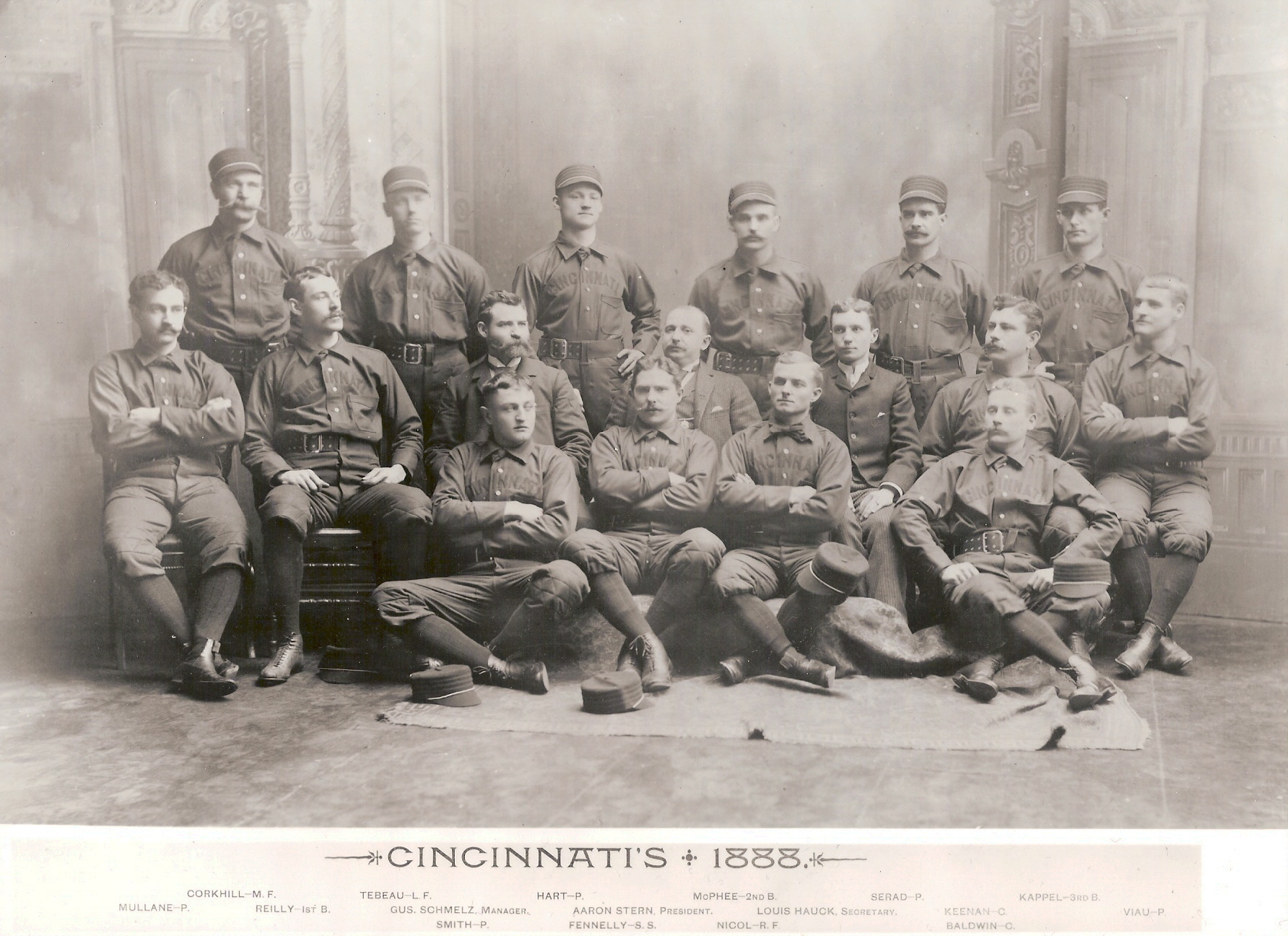
Cincinnati Rhinelanders, 1888

The neighborhood's name comes from Rhinelanders who settled the area in the mid-19th century. Many walked to work across bridges over the Miami and Erie Canal, which separated the area from downtown Cincinnati. The canal was nicknamed "the Rhine" in reference to the river Rhine in Germany, and the newly settled area north of the canal as "Over the Rhine". In German, the district was called über den Rhein.

An early reference to the canal as "the Rhine" appears in the 1853 book White, Red, Black, in which traveler Ferenc Pulszky wrote, "The Germans live all together across the Miami Canal, which is, therefore, here jocosely called the 'Rhine.' " In 1875 writer Daniel J. Kenny referred to the area exclusively as "Over the Rhine." He noted, "Germans and Americans alike love to call the district 'Over the Rhine.' "

Eventually, the canal was drained and capped by Central Parkway; the resulting tunnel was to be used for the now-defunct Cincinnati Subway project.

== History ==
Built in the nineteenth century during a period of extensive German immigration, first settled by Pennsylvania Dutch and bolstered by Rhinelanders and other Germans, Over-the-Rhine began to change demographically as residents moved to the suburbs following World War II. The city and area had lost many of the industrial jobs that once supported its workers. By the end of the century, the area was noted for its poverty. Residents united and created many life-saving organizations. Following social unrest in 2001, the neighborhood has since been the focus of millions of dollars of redevelopment.

The Over-the-Rhine museum held an event in 2017 hosted by Felicia Hofner to gather photographs, receipts, and restaurant menus from residents to scan into a digital collection to help guide research about the neighborhood.

== Geography ==
Over-the-Rhine, one of the largest, most intact urban historic districts in the United States, has several districts. The Northern Liberties, Findlay Market and the Brewery District are north of Liberty Street. South of Liberty are the Gateway Quarter and Pendleton.

=== Gateway Quarter ===
In recent years, developers have renamed the portion of Over-the-Rhine surrounding Washington Park as the "Gateway Quarter". This area has been the focal point of gentrification, which has displaced African Americans and low-income residents. More than 1,000 African Americans left this area between 2000 and 2010, and by 2012 it had become a predominantly white, wealthy and exclusive section of the neighborhood.

=== Brewery District ===
North of Liberty Street sat the heart of Cincinnati's beer brewing industry. Christian Moerlein established his first brewing company in Over-the-Rhine in 1853. Eventually the Christian Moerlein Brewing Co. became the city's largest brewery and expanded into the national market. At its height the brewery occupied three entire city blocks. Prohibition brought an end to the company in the 1920s. In 2010 the revived Christian Moerlein Brewing Co. began brewing beer in the Brewery District once again.

=== North of Liberty Street ===
This area of the neighborhood has been relatively untouched by recent "gentrification efforts" and may resemble 1990s OTR better than other areas, although work is in progress to revitalize parts of this area near Findlay Market by local developers. Plans include redeveloping vacant buildings into apartments and commercial spaces, adding a new community center and renovating Grant Park.

In the late 1820s, English writer Fanny Trollope, mother of Anthony Trollope, lived in the Mohawk area, which today is considered part of Over-the-Rhine. The acerbic portrayal of Americans of that period in her book Domestic Manners of the Americans is based in part on her interactions with the rough-hewn residents of the area.

Until 1849, today's Liberty Street, then called Northern Row, was the corporation line forming Cincinnati's northern boundary. The area north of Northern Row was not subject to municipal law and was called "The Northern Liberties". In 1955, the city decided to widen Liberty Street to connect with Reading Road as an east-west crosstown access point for the interstate highway system. Buildings on the south side of the street were demolished and the street was widened from two to five lanes. As of 2019, efforts are underway to narrow Liberty Street to bridge the gap between these halves of the neighborhood.

== Revitalization ==
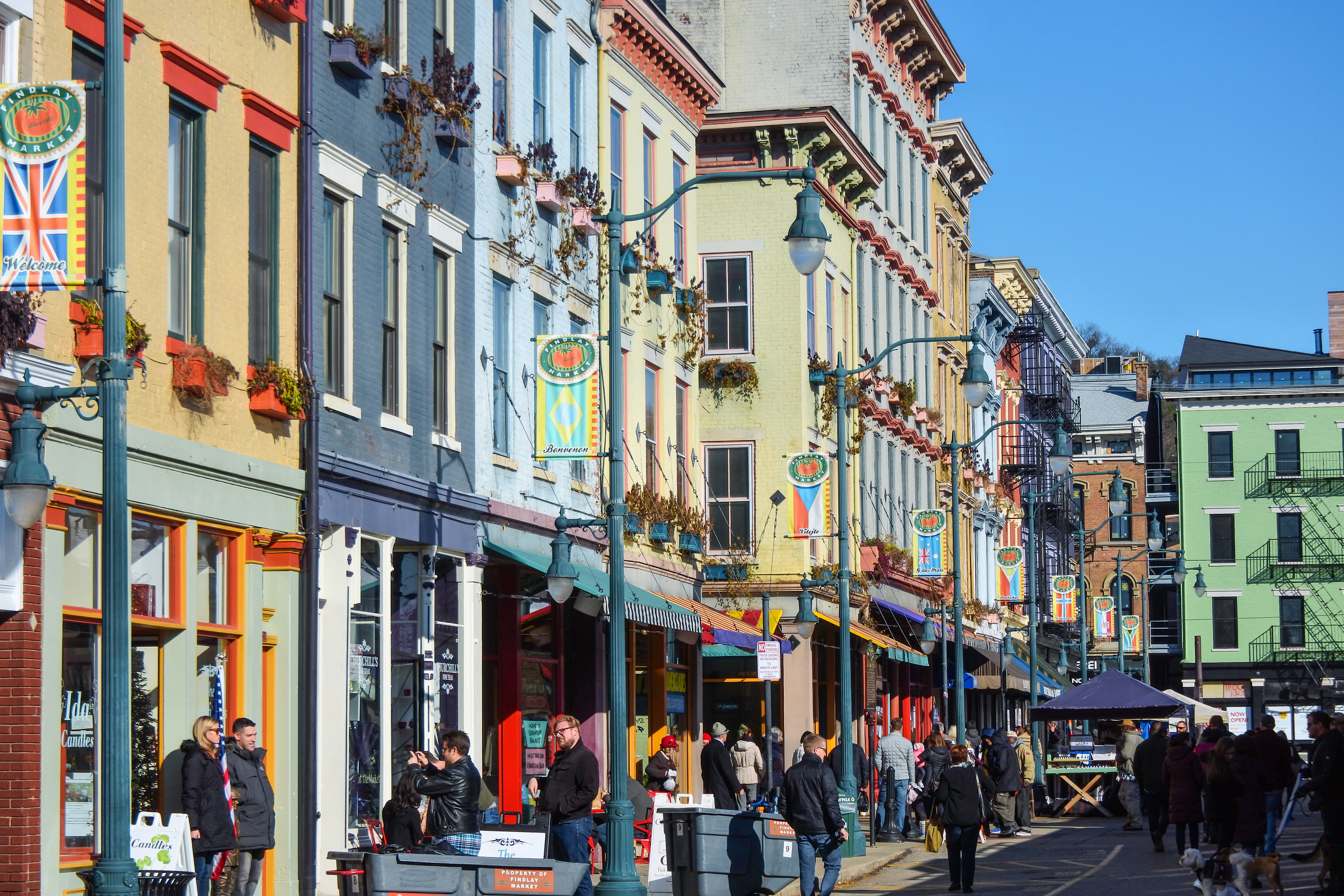
Mid 19th-century Italianate commercial buildings on Elder Street near Findlay Market

Over-the-Rhine, the site of the 2001 Cincinnati riots, became the city's most dangerous neighborhood by 2009. However, it has since seen intensive redevelopment efforts. Private development corporations and city officials have begun to address the problems that come with a neighborhood with low employment and high crime rates. A neo-liberal urban renewal strategy encourages private corporations rather than the city government to take on renewing and updating this area.

=== Cincinnati Center City Development Corporation ===
The Cincinnati Center City Development Corporation (3CDC) is a private, non-profit real-estate development and finance organization focused on revitalizing Cincinnati's urban core with the city government and local corporations. Its work is focused on the central business district and in the Over-the-Rhine neighborhood. The organization is widely credited with revitalizing OTR. The organization began as a full-service real estate developer, but has since branched out and produces more than 1,000 events per year at the four civic spaces it manages: Fountain Square, Washington Park, Ziegler Park and Memorial Hall.

In July 2003, 3CDC was formed by former mayor of Cincinnati Charlie Luken and other corporate community members. This was a result of a recommendation by a City of Cincinnati Economic Development Task Force. Most funds are gathered through corporate contributions. In 2004, 3CDC accepted responsibility for overseeing Cincinnati New Markets Fund and Cincinnati Equity Fund. As of May 2018, those funds total over $250 million and have resulted in over $1.3 billion invested in downtown and Over-the-Rhine real estate projects.

== Architecture ==
Over-the-Rhine has been praised for its collection of historic architecture. The New York Times described the neighborhood as having "a scale and grace reminiscent of Greenwich Village in New York." Its architectural significance has also been compared to the French Quarter in New Orleans and the historic districts of Savannah, Georgia and Charleston, South Carolina. When Arthur Frommer, founder of the Frommer's travel guides, visited Over-the-Rhine he described it as the most promising urban area for revitalization in the United States, and claimed that its potential for tourism "literally could rival similar prosperous and heavily visited areas."

Most of Over-the-Rhine's ornate brick buildings were built by German immigrants from 1865 to the 1880s. The architecture of Over-the-Rhine reflects the diverse styles of the late nineteenth century—simple vernacular, muted Greek Revival, Italianate and Queen Anne. Most of the buildings in Over-the-Rhine are one of these styles, but other motifs include the Art Deco American Building on Central Parkway; the Germania Building at Twelfth and Walnut streets, ironically one of the few examples of German ornamentation in the neighborhood; Music Hall, a mixture of styles best described as Venetian Gothic; a handful of buildings with Gothic architecture; and the new SCPA on Central Parkway, the most notable example of Modern architecture in the neighborhood.

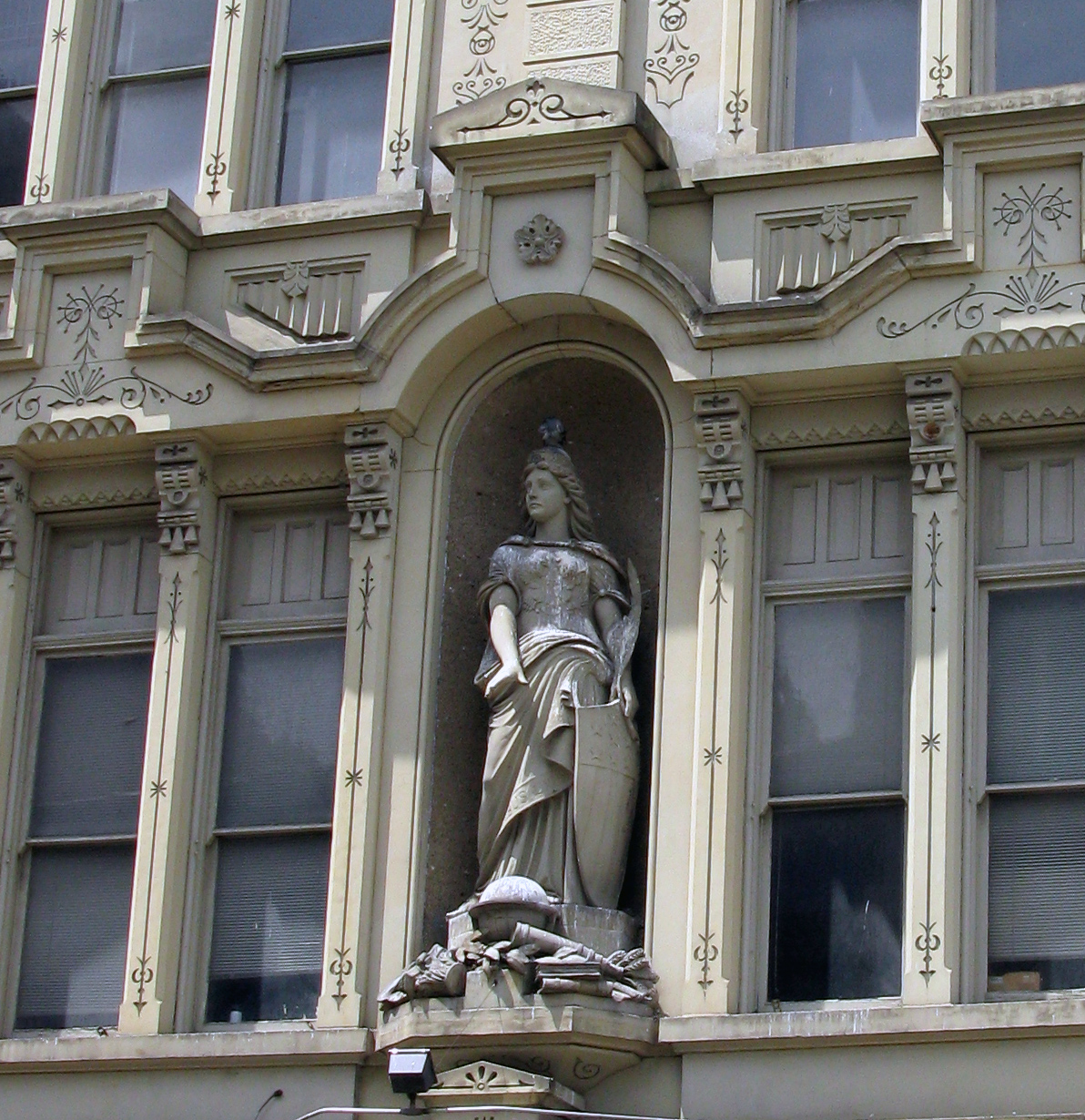
The Germania Building (Eastlake H)

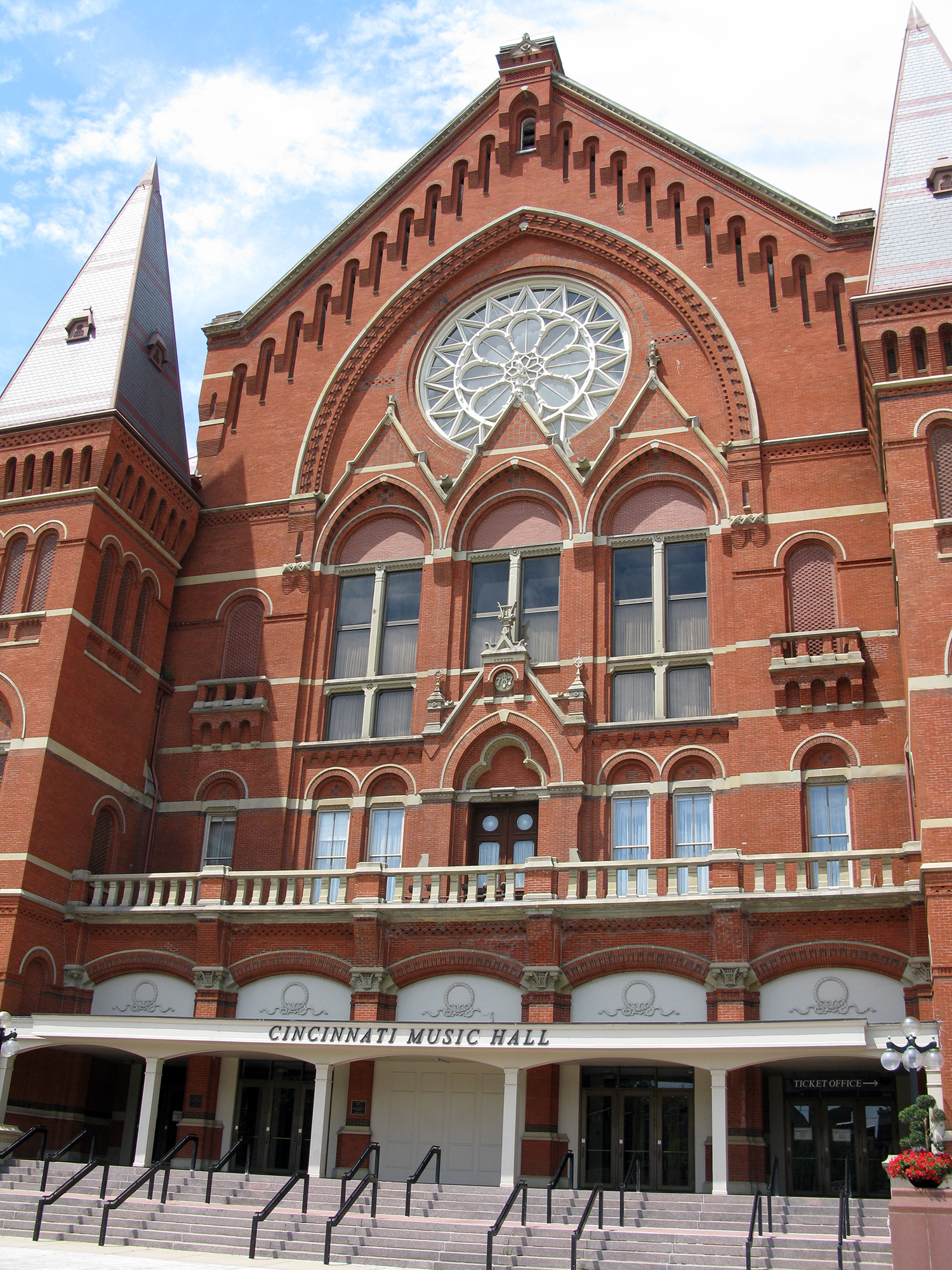
Music Hall (Venetian Gothic)

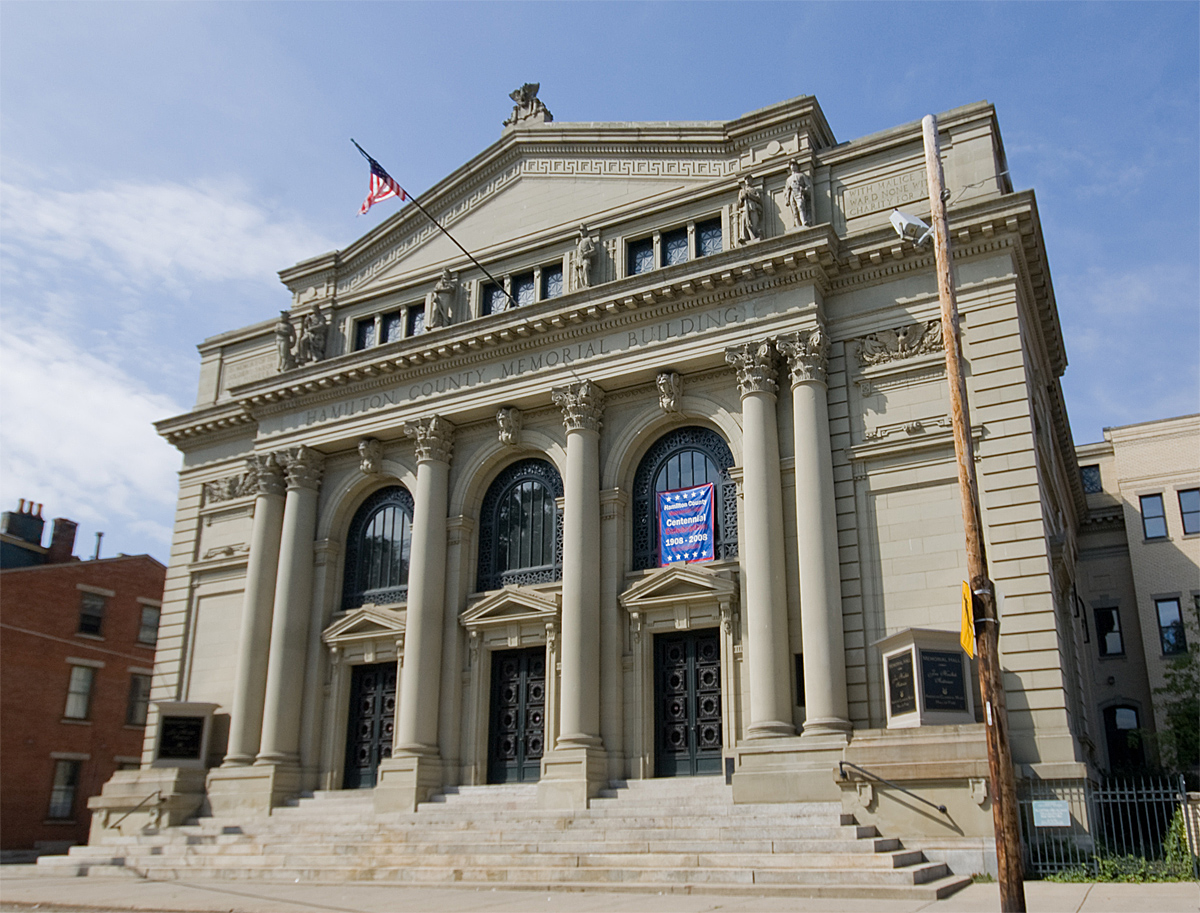
Memorial Hall (Beaux Arts)

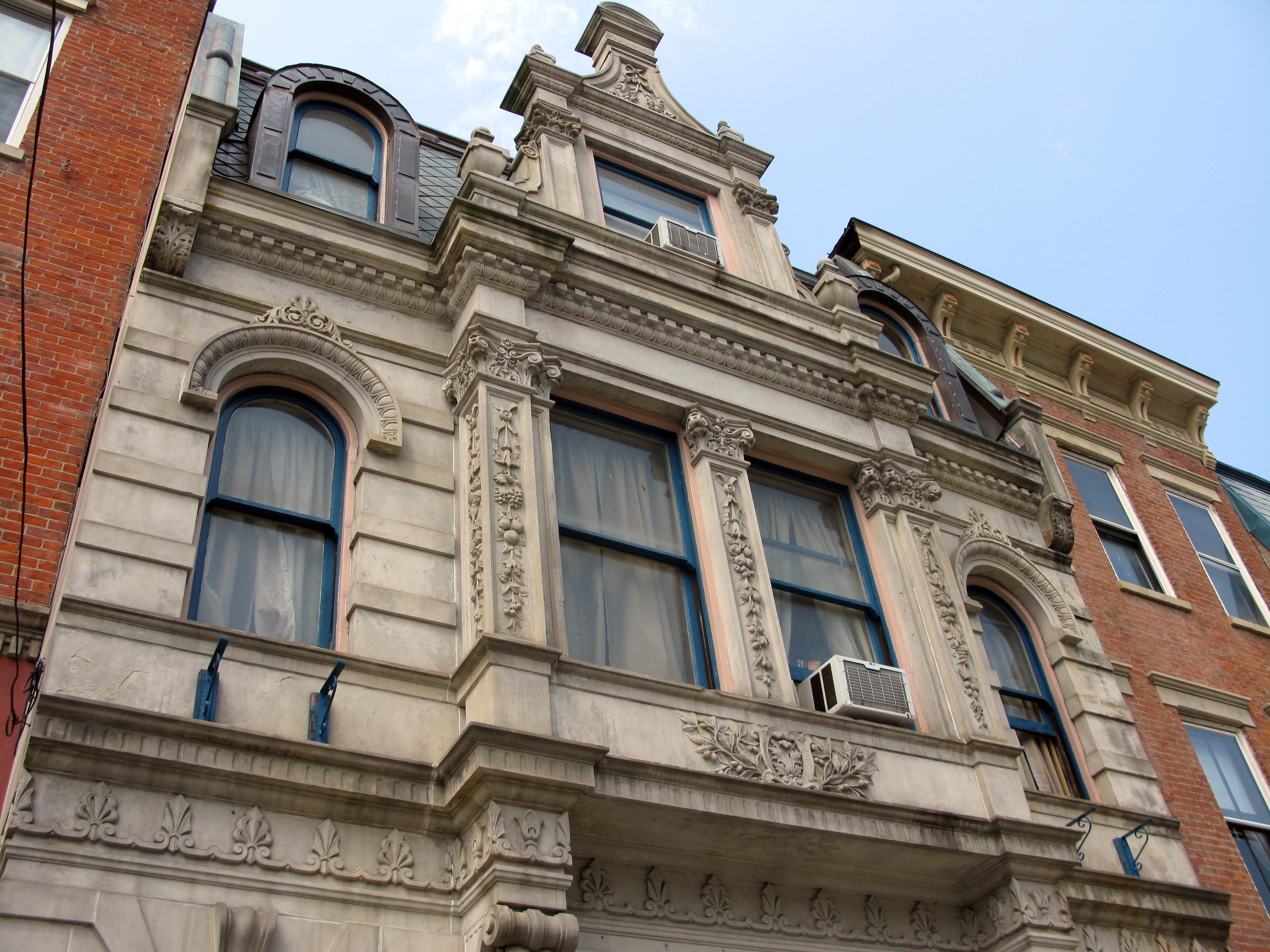
Elaborate ornamentation of an Elm Street building

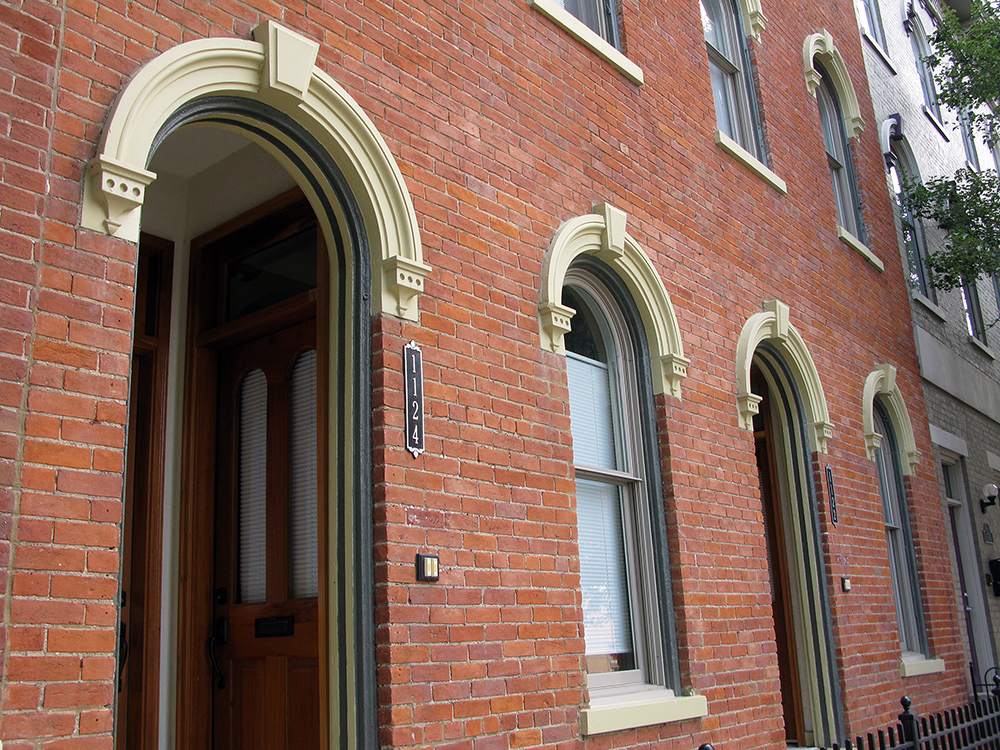
Rounded window cornices are a common feature of Italianate architecture.

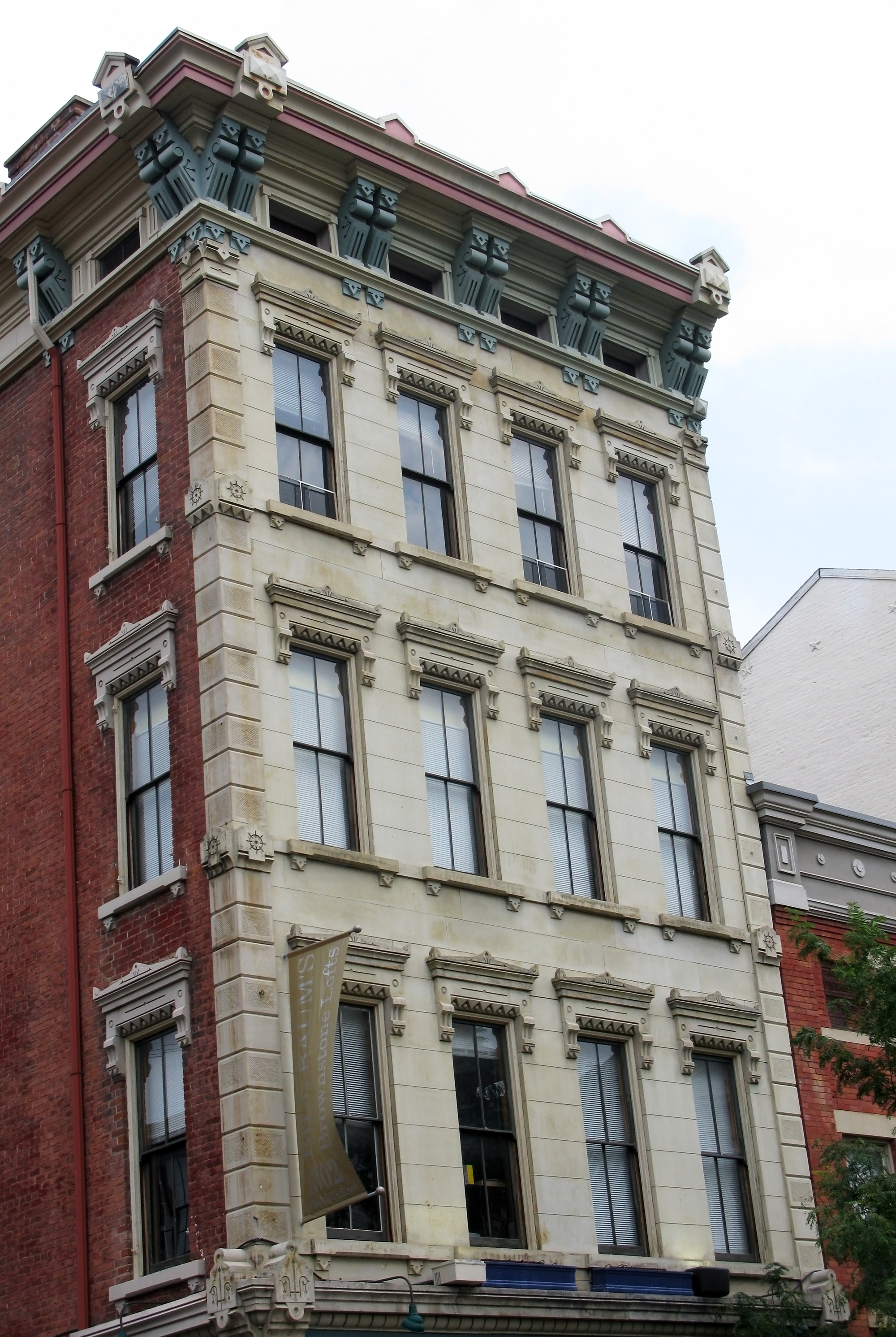
Italianate greystone at Clay and 13th Streets.

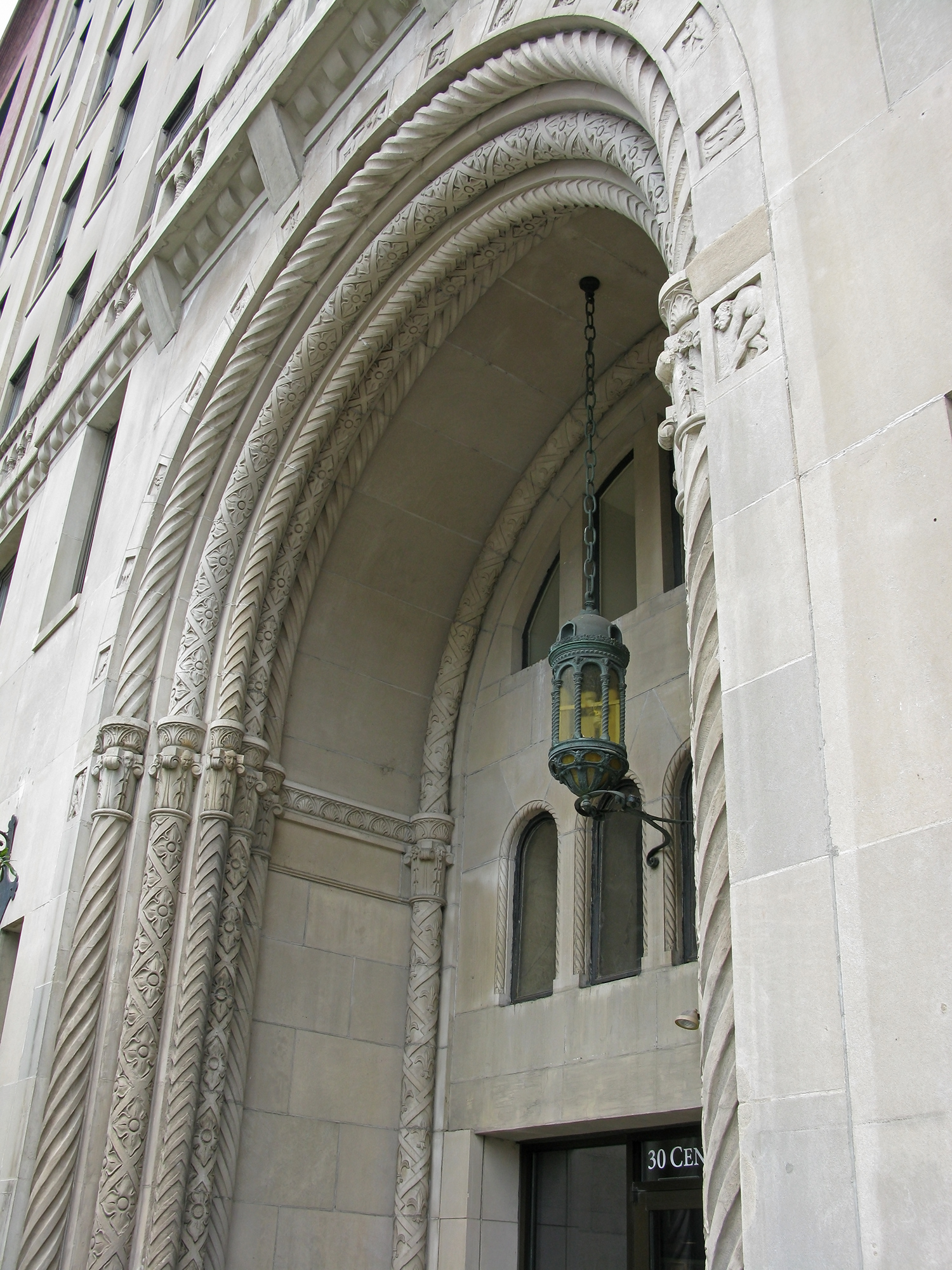
Entrance to the American Building (Art Deco)

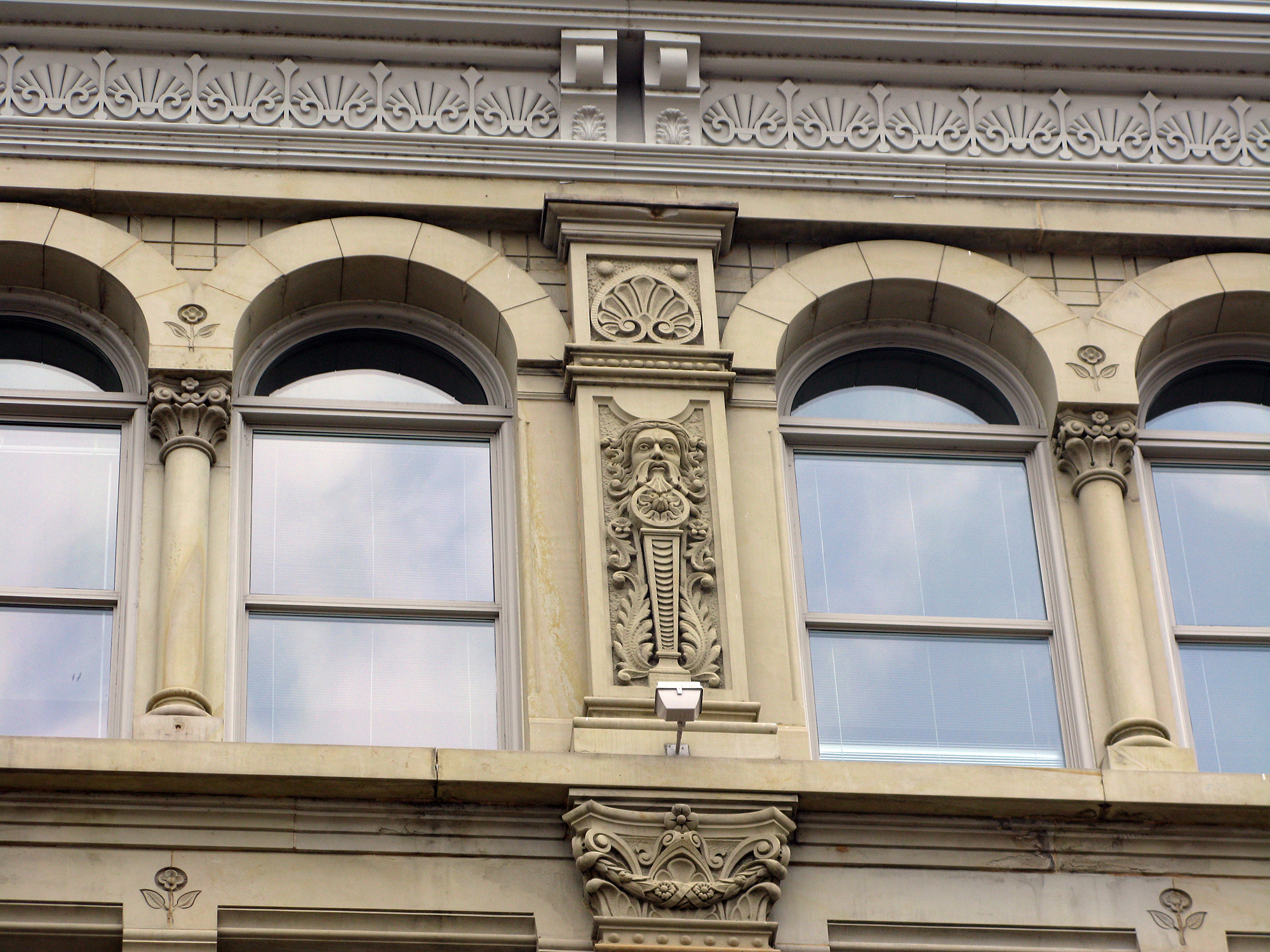
Hanke Building on Main Street detail (Renaissance Revival)

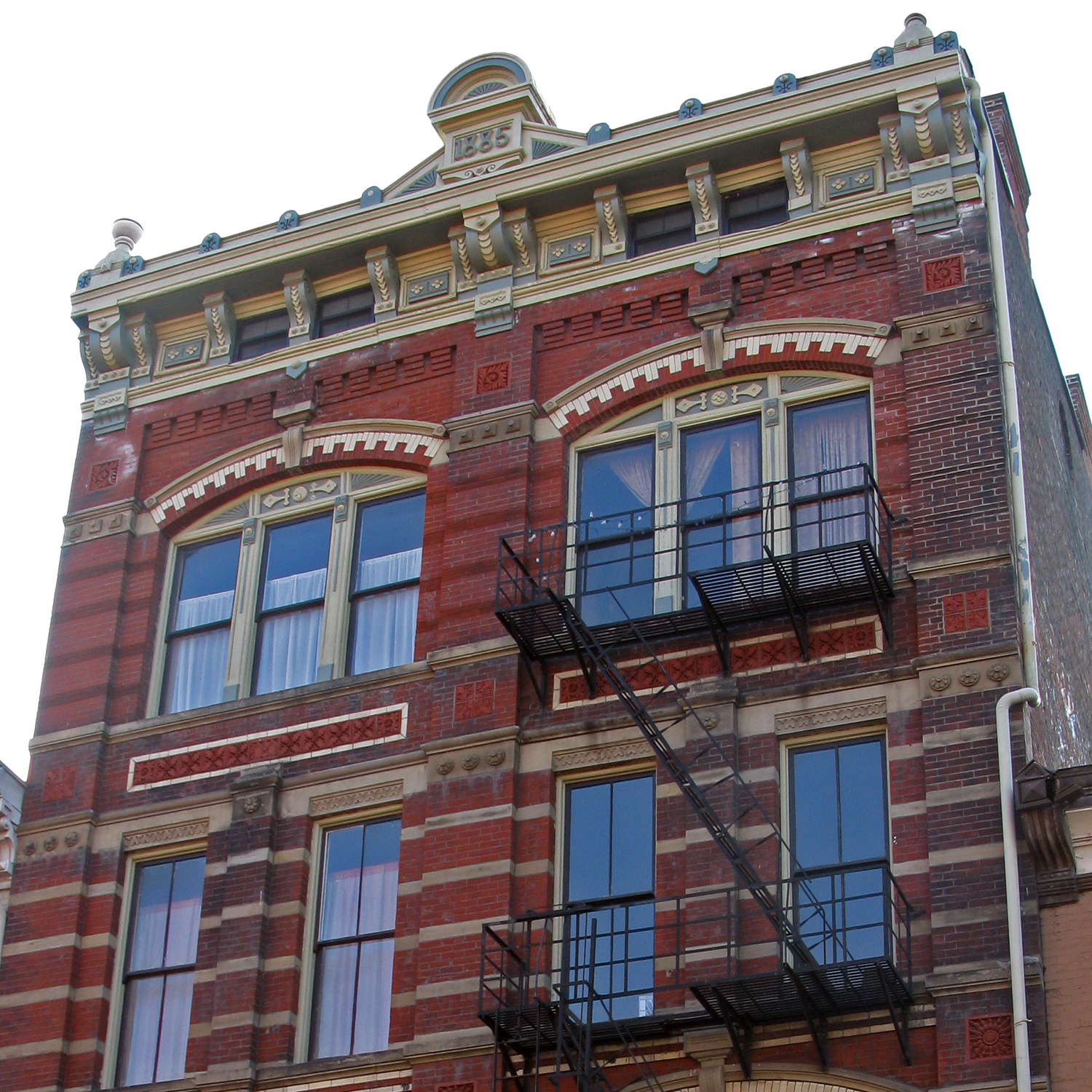
Queen Anne architecture on Main Street

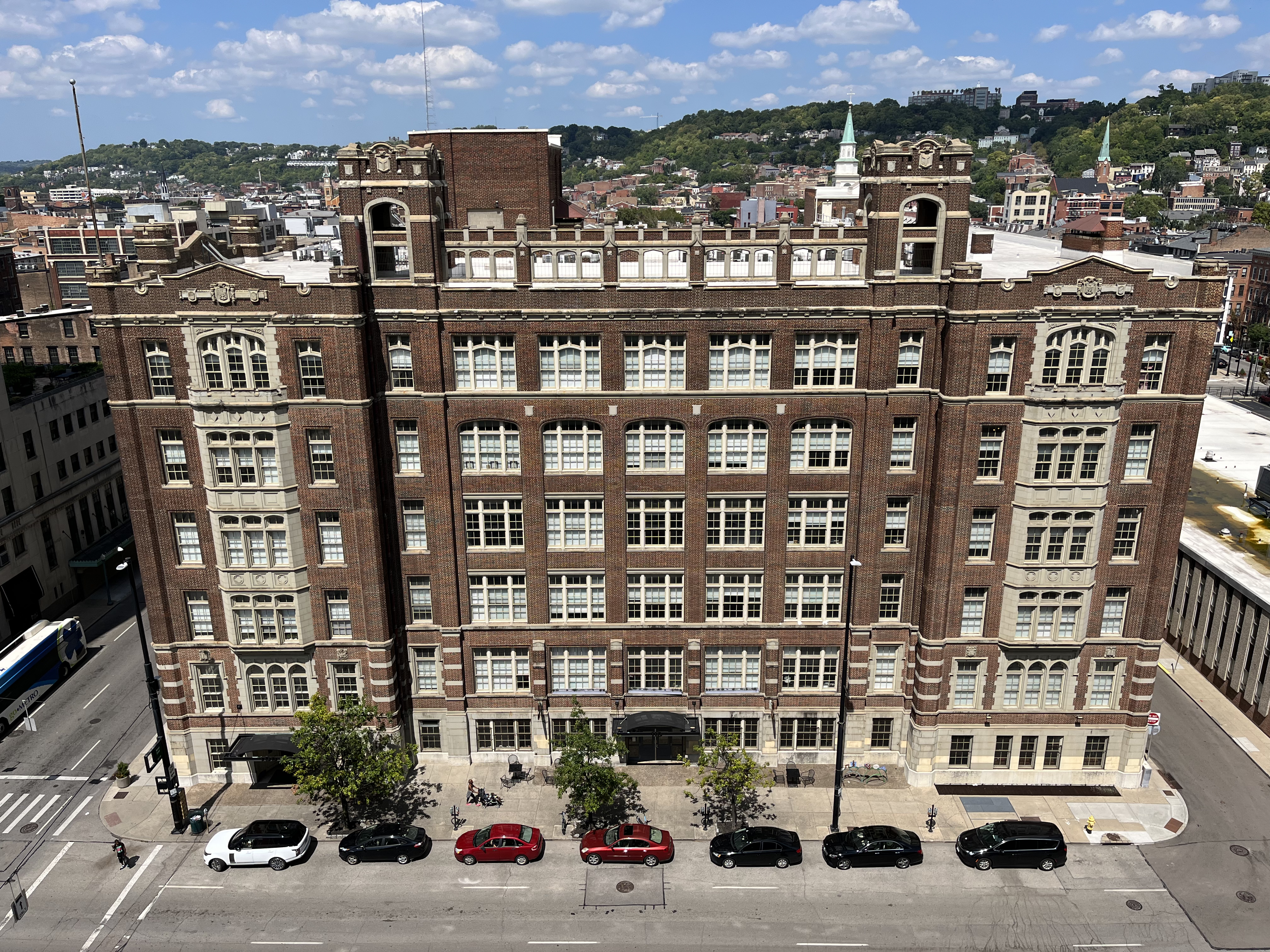
Building at 110 E. Central Parkway

=== New construction ===
Noted Indianapolis architect Evans Woollen III and his architectural firm of Woollen, Molzan and Partners helped redevelop the historic neighborhood in the 1970s and 1980s. Woollen designed the Over-the-Rhine Pilot Center (1972–84), a group of four modern, mixed-use buildings within a two-block area. The Pilot Center buildings included a recreational center, a senior citizens center, a Montessori school and daycare center, and a meeting and event space. Funding for the $2.5 million project came from the U.S. Department of Housing and Urban Development.

=== Historic restoration ===
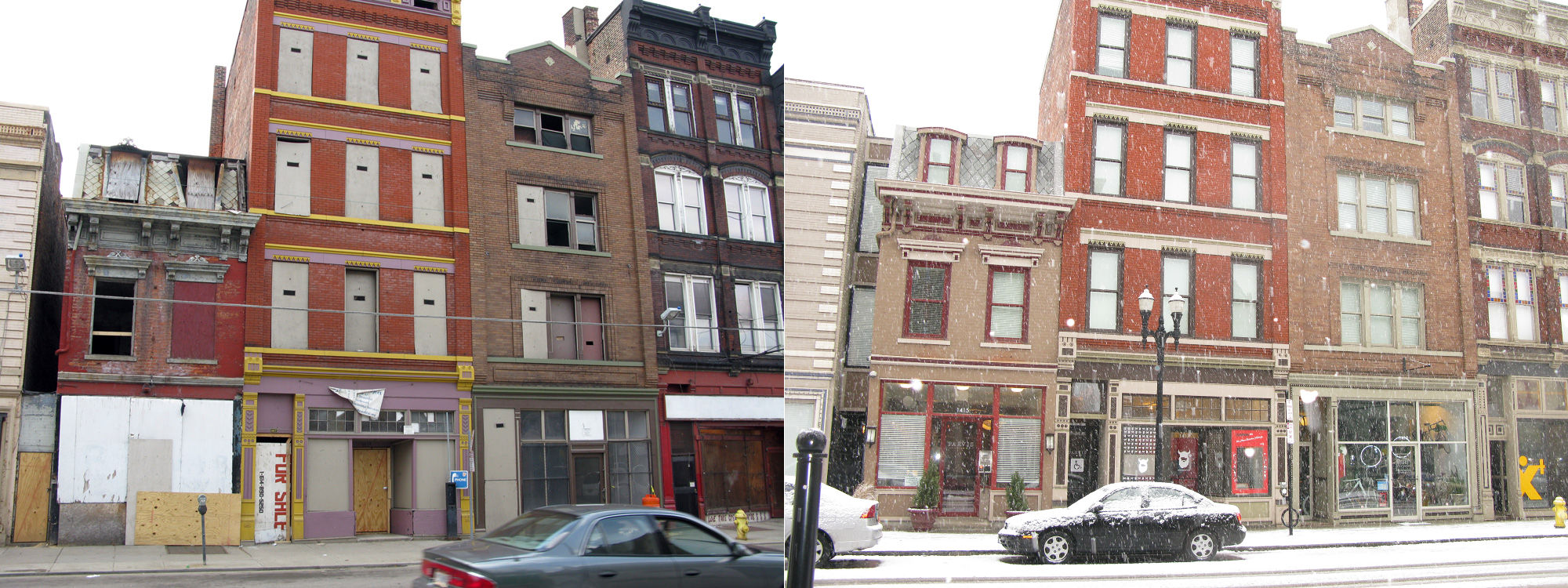
A comparison of a section of Vine Street from 2009 and 2013.

In 2011 the Over-the-Rhine Foundation, which works to prevent historic building loss in OTR, won third place in the National Trust for Historic Preservation's nationwide "This Place Matters" community challenge. In 2006 the National Trust for Historic Preservation listed the status of Over-the-Rhine as "Endangered." Since 1930, about half of Over-the-Rhine's historic buildings have been destroyed. More will follow unless deteriorating buildings are repaired. Between 2001 and 2006, the city approved more than 50 "emergency demolitions," which were caused by absentee landlords' allowing their buildings to become so critically dilapidated that the city declared them a danger to the public. Reinvestment could have saved them. Due to the situation, the National Trust for Historic Preservation declared Over-the-Rhine one of Eleven Most Endangered Historic Places in 2006. Over-the-Rhine was included in the 2008 book, Frommer's 500 Places to See Before They Disappear, which noted the district's "shocking state of neglect".

According to WCPO in 2001, some of the worst-kept properties at the time were owned by Over-the-Rhine's non-profits, which let the buildings sit vacant and deteriorating because of lack of funds or volunteers. With some buildings on the verge of collapse, investors and real-estate developers are trying to restore them before deterioration to the point of requiring demolition. According to the U.S. Census Bureau in 2010, part of Over-the-Rhine had one of the highest rates of abandoned and vacant homes in the country. They classified it then as the sixth hardest area in the nation to get an accurate population count.

In recent years there has been a burst of restoration and development slowly moving northward year by year from Central Parkway, with a focus on attracting local small businesses rather than national chains. Developers have restored and renovated the abandoned buildings, the city renovated nearby Washington Park, and businesses and residents have moved into what were abandoned spaces. Local chefs and artisan brewers in particular embraced the area, and in 2018 Food & Wine Magazine called it "one of the country's most promising food scenes."

== Demographics ==
Population of Over-The-Rhine 1819-2020
Year	Pop.	±%
1819	10,283	—
1850	13,032	+26.7%
1860	19,226	+47.5%
1870	32,726	+70.2%
1880	33,472	+2.3%
1890	31,525	−5.8%
1900	39,500	+25.3%
1910	36,350	−8.0%
1920	30,200	−16.9%
1930	25,771	−14.7%
1940	24,246	−5.9%
1950	31,586	+30.3%
1960	27,577	−12.7%
1970	15,338	−44.4%
1980	10,206	−33.5%
1990	8,303	−18.6%
2000	6,497	−21.8%
2010	6,064	−6.7%
2020	5,622	−7.3%
2007 population was estimated at 4970 Wards were utilized from 1840-1890 which have slightly different boundaries from census tracts utilized from 1900-40.

Over-The-Rhine Amount of Dwelling Units 1950-2020
Year	Pop.	±%
1950	9,933	—
1960	9,275	−6.6%
1970	7,312	−21.2%
1980	6,387	−12.7%
1990	5,212	−18.4%
2000	4,563	−12.5%
2010	4,298	−5.8%
2020	3,845	−10.5%

Over-the-Rhine – Racial and ethnic composition Note: the US Census treats Hispanic/Latino as an ethnic category. This table excludes Latinos from the racial categories and assigns them to a separate category. Hispanics/Latinos may be of any race. Over-The-Rhine includes census tracts 9, 10, 16, and 17
Race / Ethnicity (NH = Non-Hispanic)	Pop 2000	Pop 2010	Pop 2020	% 2000	% 2010	% 2020
White alone (NH)	1,254	1,483	2,617	19.30%	24.46%	46.55%
Black or African American alone (NH)	4,899	4,335	2,415	75.40%	71.49%	42.96%
Native American or Alaska Native alone (NH)	15	17	5	0.23%	0.28%	0.09%
Asian alone (NH)	26	46	107	0.40%	0.76%	1.90%
Native Hawaiian or Pacific Islander alone (NH)	1	0	1	0.02%	0.00%	0.02%
Other race alone (NH)	32	1	22	0.49%	0.02%	0.39%
Mixed race or Multiracial (NH)	110	98	260	1.69%	1.62%	4.62%
Hispanic or Latino (any race)	160	84	195	2.46%	1.39%	3.47%
Total	6,497	6,064	5,622	100.00%	100.00%	100.00%

In 2001 there were an estimated 500 vacant buildings in Over-the-Rhine with 2,500 residential units. Of those residential units 278 were condemned as uninhabitable. Also in 2001 the owner-occupancy rate was between 3 and 4 percent compared to the citywide rate of 39 percent. According to the "Drilldown", a comprehensive analysis of the city's actual population and demographics conducted in 2007, OTR's current population was just 4,970. As of 2024 , the racial makeup of Over-the-Rhine was 44% White, 43.3% African American, 4.3% Hispanics or Latinos of any race, 0.8% Asian, and 11.9% other. The neighborhood's residents comprise roughly 1.2% of the population of the City of Cincinnati.

Recent gentrification has changed the demographic makeup of the area as residents moving in tend to have a higher income and are more likely to be white. By 2018 the website statisticalatlas.com was estimating OTR's population to be 34% white and 54% black, with 56% of those between the ages of 20 and 24 being white. By 2024, white people had become the largest ethnic group in OTR.

== In media ==
- In the movie Ides of March, George Clooney plays a politician who campaigns at Memorial Hall in Over-the-Rhine.
- In the movie Traffic (2000), the teenage daughter of the US drug czar becomes addicted to heroin and goes to Over-the-Rhine for drugs.
- Harry's Law (2011), an NBC legal comedy-drama, is set in Over-the-Rhine, though only old stock photos are shown. No filming was done in Over-the-Rhine or Cincinnati.
- Little Man Tate (1991) was filmed in Over-the-Rhine as well as various other Cincinnati locations.
- A Rage in Harlem (1991) was filmed in Over-the-Rhine because it resembled 1950s Harlem.
- In Eight Men Out (1988) scenes depicting Chicago in 1919 were shot in Over-the-Rhine.
- Over-the-Rhine and other nearby neighborhoods are featured in the 3 Doors Down music video “It's Not My Time”.
- In music, the folk-rock group Over the Rhine took its name from the Cincinnati neighborhood, where the band first started in 1989.
- The indie band Big Red Machine has a song called "The Ghost of Cincinnati" which repeatedly references Over-the-Rhine and its gentrification.
- Cincinnati-born vocalist Matt Berninger references the neighborhood in the lyrics of the 2015 EL VY song "I'm the Man to Be."
- Electronic Music Producer "OTR" took his name from the Cincinnati neighborhood, when he saw the transformation it was undergoing mirrored his own.

== List of annual events ==
A partial list of Over-the-Rhine’s distinctive annual events includes:

- Bockfest
- Cincinnati Fringe Festival Annual - Occurs the two weeks after Memorial Day
- MidPoint Music Festival
- Cincinnati May Festival
- Cincinnati Reds Opening Day Parade from Findlay Market to Fountain Square
- Nowhere Else Music and Arts Festival

== List of landmarks ==
Most of Over-the-Rhine's landmarks are related to the arts and are clustered in one area near Downtown.

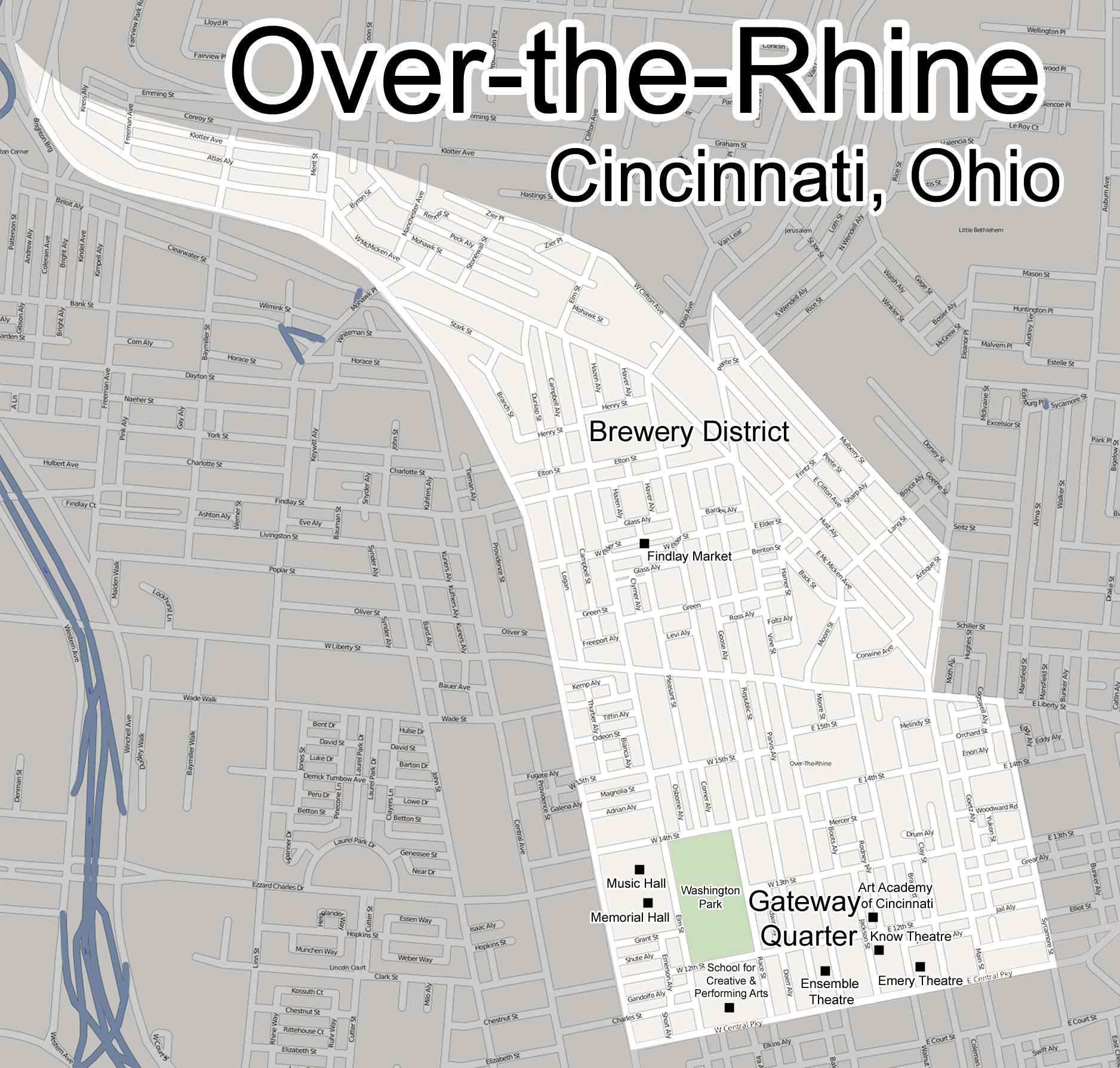
Map of Over-the-Rhine

- Art Academy of Cincinnati, founded in 1869, is a four-year arts college with its campus centered around 12th and Jackson streets.
- Cincinnati Music Hall, built in 1878, is a concert theatre that hosts the Cincinnati Opera, the Cincinnati Symphony Orchestra, the Cincinnati Pops Orchestra, and the Cincinnati May Festival.
- Emery Theatre was built as the original home of the Cincinnati Symphony Orchestra. Famous conductor Leopold Stokowski considered its acoustics comparable to Carnegie Hall. It is currently closed for renovations.
- Ensemble Theatre of Cincinnati In Over The Rhine since 1988, a theatre that presents new works and works that are new to the region.
- Findlay Market is the oldest continuously operated public market in Ohio. It is also the site of special events and a farmers' market.
- Know Theatre of Cincinnati a theatre that produces contemporary theatre with new works and regional premieres. Know Theatre produces the annual Cincinnati Fringe Festival - the largest performing arts festival in Cincinnati.
- Memorial Hall is the home of the Cincinnati Chamber Orchestra, the progressive MusicNow festival, and the American Classical Music Hall of Fame and Museum.
- School for Creative and Performing Arts is the first K-12 selective arts school in the United States. In 2009 the school was the subject of the MTV reality television series Taking the Stage.
- Washington Park, the second oldest park in the city behind Piatt Park, originally established as a burial ground for several small churches.
- Cincinnati Ballet

=== List of historic churches ===
- St. Paulus Kirche, 1419 Race Street, German Evangelical Protestant (Oldest Protestant church in the city)
- German Baptist Church, Walnut and Liberty Streets
- Old St. Mary's Church, 123 E. Thirteenth Street
- Philippus United Church of Christ, West Mcmicken and Ohio Avenues
- St. John the Baptist Church, Green and Bremen Streets
- Saint Francis Seraph Church, Vine and Liberty Streets
- St. Paul Church, East 12th and Spring Streets
- Salem United Church of Christ, 1425 Sycamore Street
- Nast Trinity United Methodist Church, 1310 Race Street (Known as Over-the-Rhine Community Methodist Church since 2015)
- Wesley Chapel, 76 E. McMicken Avenue
- Prince of Peace Lutheran Church, 1528 Race Street
- First Lutheran Church, 1208 Race Street
- St. John's Unitarian Church, 1205 Elm Street

== Notable people ==
- Buddy Gray, community activist
- Anna Marie Hahn, serial killer
- Ronald Howes, American toy inventor, created the Easy-Bake Oven
- Venus Ramey, 1944 Miss America winner
