= Ensemble Theatre Cincinnati =

Regional theatre in the United States

- Interactive map of Ensemble Theatre Cincinnati
- Address: Cincinnati; United States
- Coordinates: 39°6′40.42″N 84°30′37.77″W
- Event: Theatre

Construction
- Opened: 1986; 40 years ago

Website
- ensemblecincinnati.org

Ensemble Theatre Cincinnati is a professional Equity theatre at 1127 Vine Street in Cincinnati, Ohio. It was founded in 1986 as the Ensemble Theatre of Cincinnati, adopting it current name in April 2012. It is Greater Cincinnati's second largest professional theatre. The company frequently produces world and regional premieres, often of plays addressing contemporary social issues.

== History ==
Ensemble Theatre was founded in 1986 by David A. White III and Jeff Seibert as a company for local professionals of the Actors’ Equity Association, presenting its first two subscription seasons at Memorial Hall in downtown Cincinnati. After this period, the company moved into its current home at 1127 Vine Street in the Over-the-Rhine neighborhood. The purchase and renovation of the building were supported financially by co-founders John and Ruth Sawyer and Ken and Mary Taft Mahler. In the early 1990s, the theatre staged works including Edward Albee's Seascape and his adaptation of Everything in the Garden.

White and Seibert left the organization in 1995, and D. Lynn Meyers was appointed interim artistic director. Her contract, originally set for three months, was extended, and she has continued in the position into the 2020s. Under her direction, the theatre has presented a number of regional premieres, such as Next to Normal, Hedwig and the Angry Inch, I Am My Own Wife, Grey Gardens, Gem of the Ocean, The Humans, The Mountaintop, and Side Man.

In 2017, the theatre underwent a renovation that added approximately 8,200 square feet to its facility, including spaces designed for educational programs and special events.

== World premieres ==
- Snow White book by Joseph McDonough, music/lyrics by David Kisor (2011)
- Size Matters by Raymond McAnally (2014)
- Cinderella: After Ever After, book by Joseph McDonough, lyrics by David Kisor, and music by Fitz Patton (2016)
- Who All Over There?, by Torie Wiggins (2023)
- Fiona: The Musical, book by Zina Camblin, music/lyrics by David Kisor (2024)
- The Match Game, by Steven Strafford (2024)
- It's Fritz! A Sequel to Fiona: The Musical, book by Zina Camblin, music/lyrics by David Kisor (2025)
