= Cincinnati Fringe Festival =

Arts festival in Cincinnati, Ohio, US

- Cincinnati Fringe Festival Logo
- Formation: 2004
- Type: Theatre group
- Purpose: Fringe Festival, Curated
- Location: Cincinnati, Ohio
- Website: http://www.cincyfringe.com/

The Cincinnati Fringe Festival (Cincy Fringe), produced by Know Theatre of Cincinnati, was founded in Cincinnati, Ohio, in 2004 and is one of Ohio's largest Performing Arts festival. It consists of 14 days of theatre, art, music, dance, and everything between. The Know Theatre produces to mark the end of its season. The festival features local, national, and international artists and takes place in the Over-the-Rhine Neighborhood in pop-up stages.

== Background ==
The Cincy Fringe was founded and produced by Know Theatre in 2004. The Fringe fits into Know's mission of creating "an artistic playground where artists and audiences can come together to produce and experience work that could not be done anywhere else." The theatre's staff works alongside festival staff to produce the festival each year. Cincy Fringe usually has around 200 performances from 40 different groups. It is unique among Fringe Festivals because it doesn't choose artists based on a first-come first-served or lottery system (a staple of almost any Fringe festival). Instead it curates it's shows choosing from the wide range of artists that apply. To choose the artists, the festival uses a jury of local theatre professionals and educators.

The festival receives around 10,000 entries per year. The applications are reviewed by four members from the adjudication team. The artistic team at Know Theatre then takes the recommendations and chooses the 30-40 shows that will be performed at the festival. The festival tries to feature 50% local productions, 50% national/international, 50% returning artists, 50% new artists, with a balance of solo artists, plays and musicals.

The festival takes the mantra "kind weird. like you" and embraces the spirit of Fringe festivals.

In addition to producing the festival, the Know theatre also produces two other programs related to Fringe: Fringe Encores and Fringe Extras. Both programs give artists from the Fringe another chance to perform outside of the festival.

Ticket costs are kept low at $16 with additional "love your artist" tickets at $20. The artists pay a $25 application and a $75 producing fee if accepted into the festival. The Know theatre then splits the profits of the box office with the producers of the Fringe act 50/50.

== Challenges ==
During its sixth year (2009), the Cincy Fringe and Know Theatre lost a major sponsor and ran into some financial troubles. Without the necessary money, the festival was in danger of folding. But it was able to find the necessary money and has continued to produce the festival for 19 years.

Like many other Fringe festivals, the Cincy Fringe went online in 2020. They were not the first Fringe to move fully online in 2020 (Orlando made the first move), but it was an opportunity to see if a regional festival might be successful. While moving fully online was not an easy decision, it was the best option at the time. Because of the switch to digital formats, fewer artists (30 instead of the usual 35-45) were produced. Despite the format challenges, the Fringe provided opportunities to their artists and audiences.

== Return of the Fringe ==
The Cincy Fringe returned to an all in-person format in 2022. This year also saw a new Fringe Producer with Katie Hartman. A veteran artist of the Cincy Fringe as part of a performing group called the Coldharts, Hartman applied to help run the festival. She is working towards new directions with the festival including more free entertainment, moving the parties, and more family-friendly opportunities.
