= Hamilton County Memorial Building =

Memorial Hall
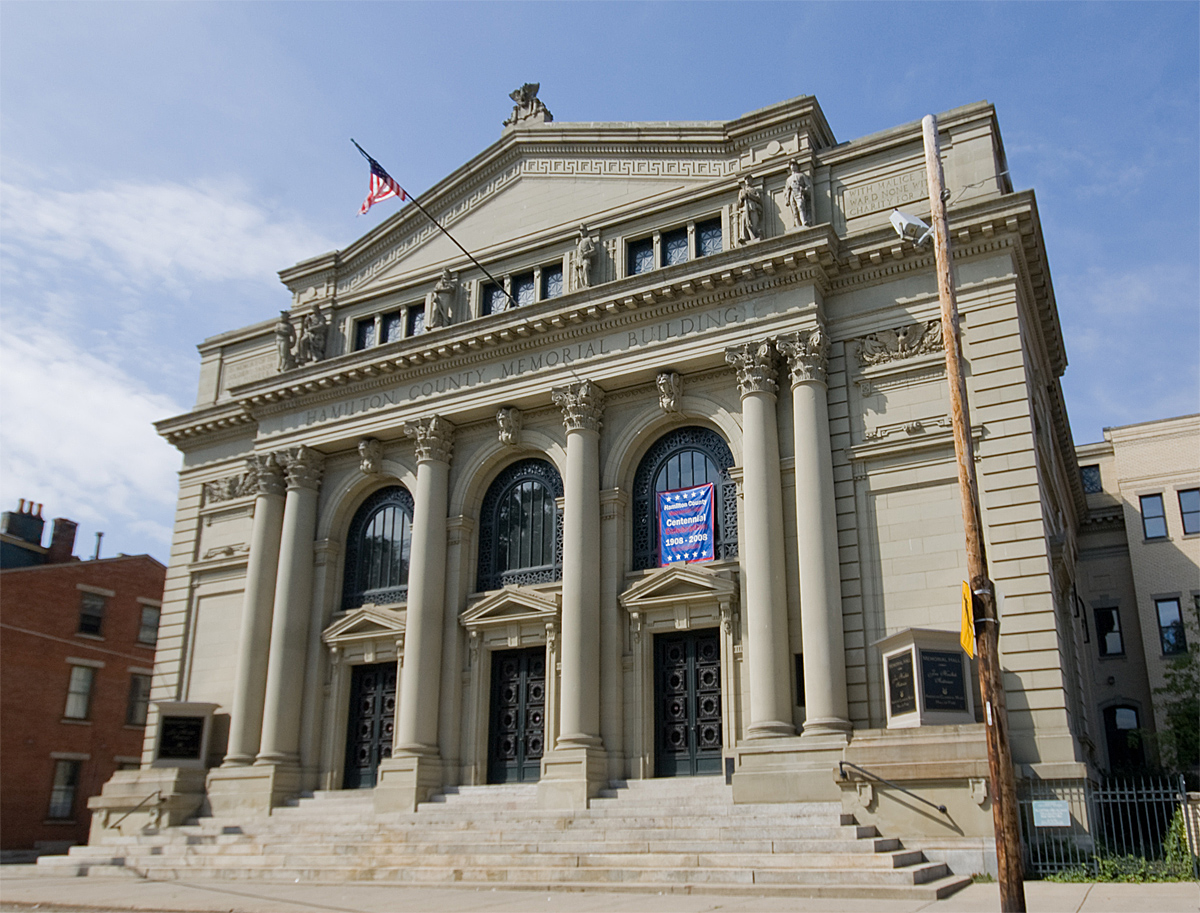
- Interactive map of Memorial Hall
- Address: 1225 Elm Street; Cincinnati, Ohio; United States
- Coordinates: 39°6′31″N 84°31′6″W
- Capacity: 556
- Public transit: Connector at 14th & Elm

Construction
- Built: 1908
- Renovated: 2016

Website
- https://www.memorialhallotr.com
- Hamilton County Memorial Building
- U.S. National Register of Historic Places
- Area: 1 acre (0.40 ha)
- Architect: Samuel Hannaford & Sons; Clement Barnhorn, sculptor
- Architectural style: Beaux Arts
- NRHP reference No.: 78002076
- Added to NRHP: December 4, 1978

The Hamilton County Memorial Building, more commonly called Memorial Hall, is located at Elm & Grant Streets, in Cincinnati, Ohio. The building is next to Cincinnati's Music Hall and across from Washington Park in the Over-the-Rhine neighborhood. It was built by the Grand Army of the Republic and Hamilton County in 1908, as a memorial to the military of the city and county. The building was built in the Beaux-Arts style. The building, including the Annie W and Elizabeth M Anderson Theater, is used for over 250 events per year.

Constructed according to a design by Samuel Hannaford and Sons, the Memorial Building was intended to commemorate members of all branches of the U.S. armed services, as well as the pioneers who had established the United States. The hall contains a 556-seat theater that was designed for speaking, but is also used as a venue for concerts, film screenings and theatrical events. The theater's small size and acoustics allow for words spoken on stage in a normal voice to be easily be understood at the back of the balcony.

In late 1978, the Memorial Building was listed on the National Register of Historic Places, qualifying for inclusion both because of its architecture and its history. Its location on Washington Park places it in the historic district that embraces most of Over-the-Rhine, which was added to the Register five years after the Memorial Building was individually added. The hall is home to the American Classical Music Hall of Fame organization.

An $11 million renovation to the building was completed in December 2016.
