= History of Cincinnati =

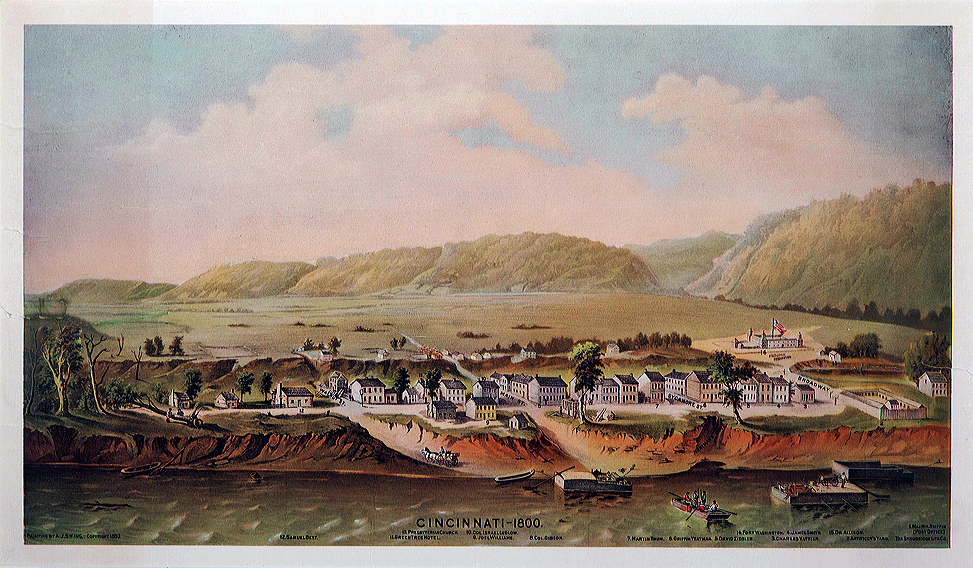
Cincinnati in 1800, lithograph, based on a painting by A.J. Swing. In 1800, there were about 30 buildings and a population of 750 people.

Cincinnati began with the settlement of Columbia, Losantiville, and North Bend in the Northwest Territory of the United States beginning in late December 1788. The following year Fort Washington, named for George Washington, was established to protect the settlers.

It was chartered as a town in 1802, and then incorporated as a city in 1819, when it was first called "Queen of the West". Located on the Ohio River, the city prospered as it met the needs of westward bound pioneers who traveled on the river. It had 30 warehouses to supply military and civilian travelers — and had hotels, restaurants and taverns to meet their lodging and dining needs.

Cincinnati became the sixth largest city in the United States, with a population of 115,435, by 1850. Before the Civil War, it was an important stop on the Underground Railroad. Due to the Defense of Cincinnati, there was never a shot fired in the city during the Civil War.

Important industries throughout its history include meatpacking, iron production, steamboat repair and construction, carriage manufacturing, woodworking, cloth production, and engines. During World War I and II, Cincinnatians rallied to serve in the military, manufacture and produce supplies needed by the military, conserve scarce goods, buy Liberty Bonds, and donate to relief funds. There were increased opportunities for women and blacks during World War II, which ultimately shifted their social position after the war. The city is now a regional and national headquarters for many organizations.

== Early history ==
=== Native Americans ===
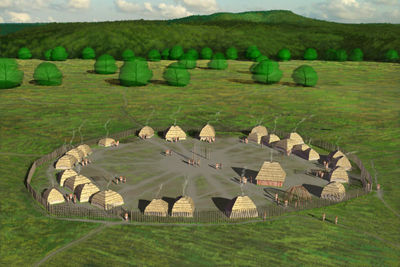
Artists conception of the SunWatch Indian Village of the Fort Ancient people

From about 900 to 1600 CE, during the Late Prehistoric Period, a distinct material culture, named Fort Ancient by archaeologists, was found throughout southwest Ohio. The peoples who likely made this material culture include Shawnee, Mosopelea, Moneton and Massawomeck. They lived in large agricultural towns and hunted animal populations in the winter throughout the Ohio River Valley. Men hunted and protected their tribes, while women gathered food and farmed crops. They constructed wigwams for lodging in the villages. The area also included other tribes such as the Ojibwe, Miami and Lenape people.

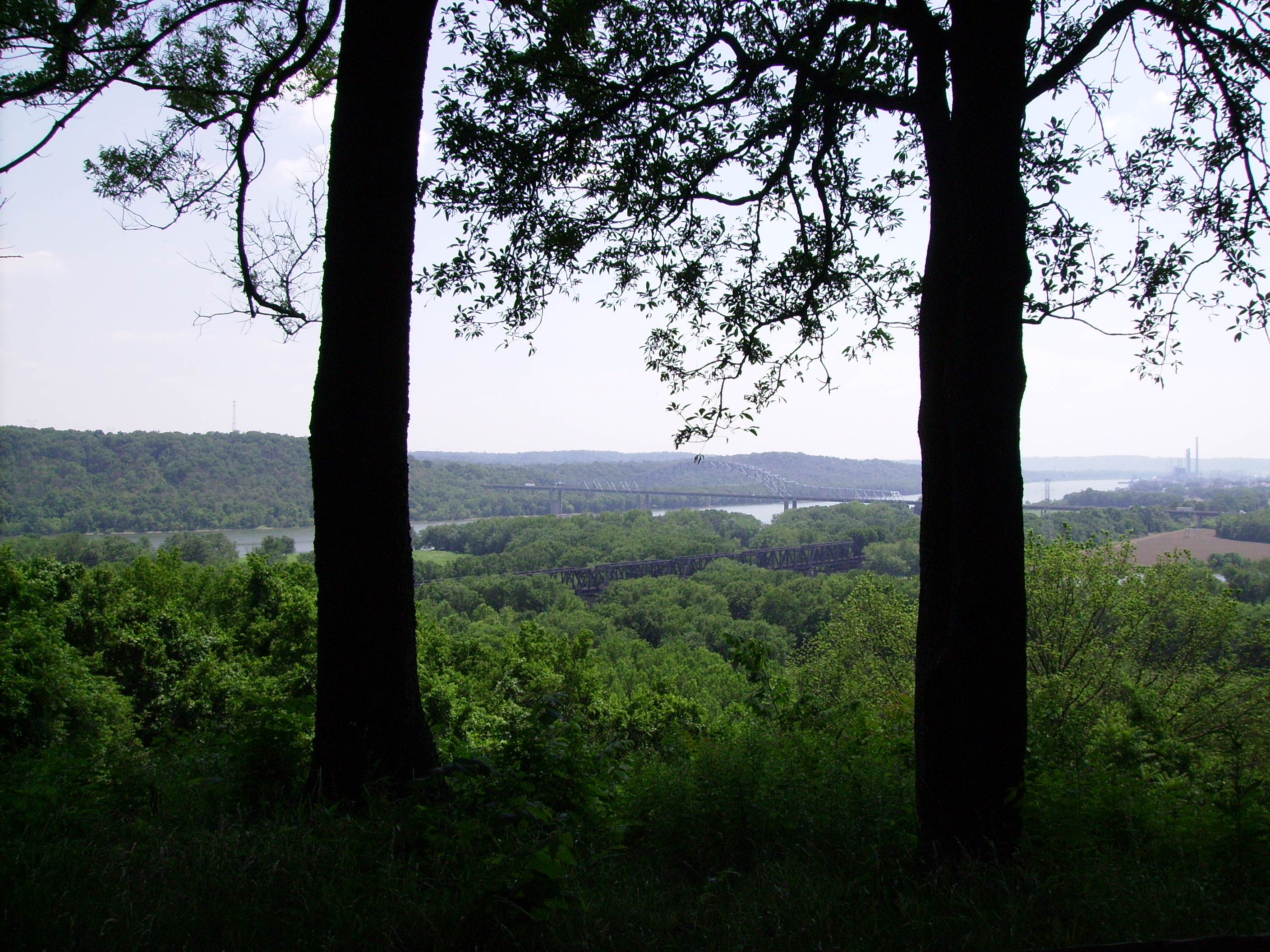
View from the Shawnee Lookout Archeological District, which may be the largest continuously occupied hilltop Native American site in the United States.

Their way of life changed, beginning in the mid-1600s, as European colonists settled on their hunting and summer lands. Competition began between European colonial powers and Native American tribes in the ensuing fur trade. Their options for redress were to flee to unoccupied lands, assimilate, or fight. Many Shawnee and other tribes were temporarily driven out of Ohio beginning in the 1640s by the Haudenosaunee Confederacy who hunted deer, beaver, and other fur-bearing animals. According to the State of Ohio's "Ohio Memory" historical research site, "The Shawnee, and other tribes with claims to Ohio lands, could return in 1701 when the Treaty of Grande Paix ended the Iroquois' campaign in the Ohio Country, but American Indians continued to struggle with other tribes against the colonies over land disputes."

The Shawnee supported the French during the French and Indian War (1754–1763). There were continued land disputes and treaties in the 18th century. Members of the Ojibwe, Lenape, Odawa, Wyandotte and Shawnee tribes allied with the Miami tribe, led by Little Turtle in the fight for their land. Ultimately, after the Battle of the Wabash (1792) and Battle of Fallen Timbers (1794), eleven tribes signed the Treaty of Greenville in 1794 which forced them to relinquish most of their land.

=== Symmes Purchase ===
Symmes Purchase, elongated strip in blue, within a map of Ohio

With the conclusion of the Revolutionary War, the country expanded westward to frontier land north of the Ohio River and within the confines of the Northwest Territory. In 1786, Benjamin Stites traveled to the Little Miami Valley and noticed that there was fertile land for settlement and conveyed that information to eastern speculators. (Note: South of the river, there were 70,000 white settlers in Kentucky by the late 1780s.) Hearing of the possibilities, a Continental Congress delegate John Cleves Symmes, purchased one (Note: It was later reduced to 311,682 acres.) or two million acres in 1787 from the Congress of the Confederation that was called Symmes Purchase. Also called the Miami Purchase, the land between the Great and Little Miami Rivers, ultimately became Warren, Butler, and Hamilton Counties. Of Symmes Purchase, Stites purchased 10,000 acres, 800 acres of which he sold to Mathias Denman. Denman's land was along the Ohio River and across from the mouth of the Licking River.

=== Three initial settlements ===
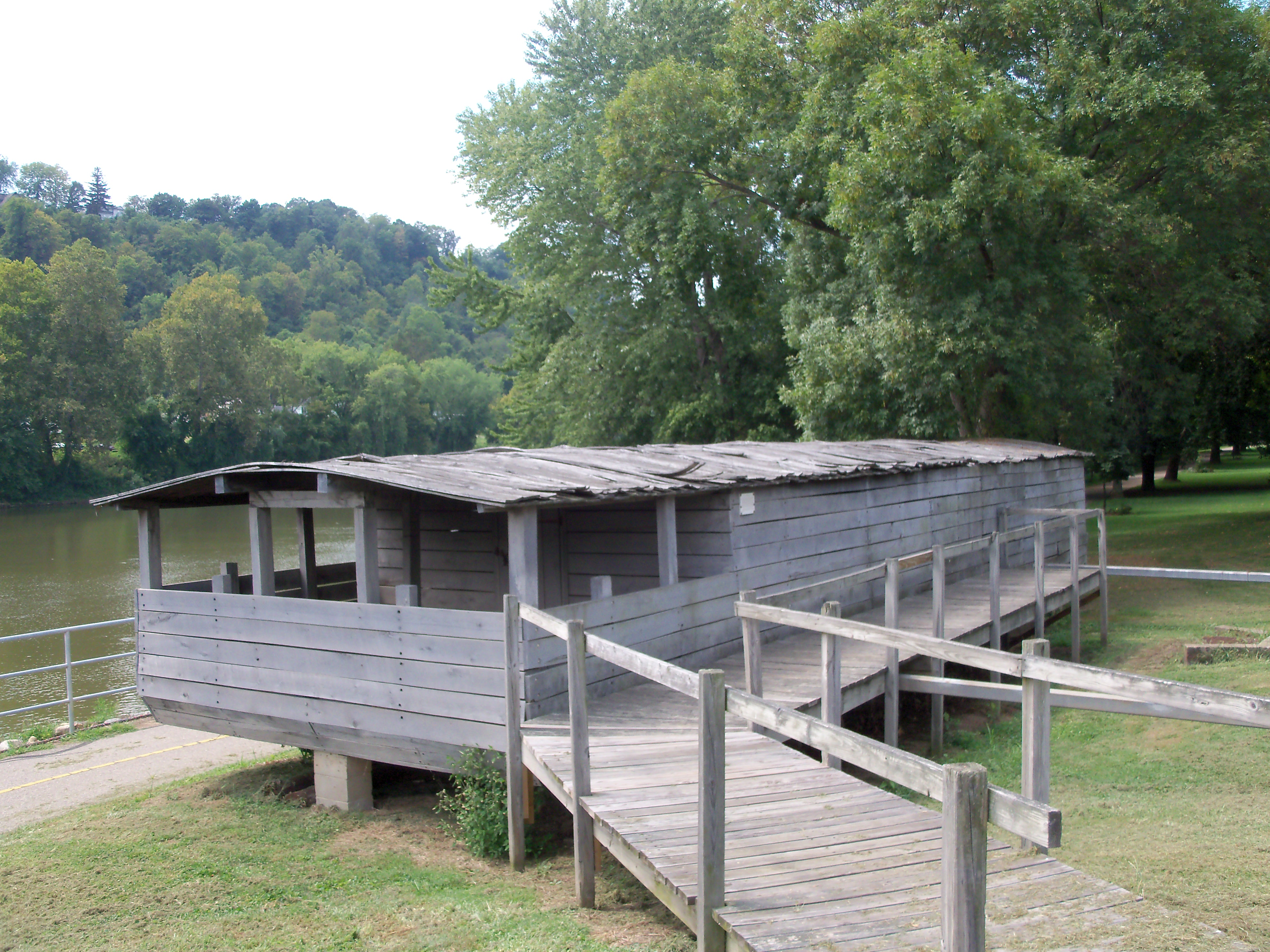
Replica of a flatboat that delivered pioneers to the three settlements: Columbia, Losantiville, and North Bend that would become Cincinnati.

Pioneers came on flatboats along the Ohio River to settle what would become Cincinnati, located between the Little Miami and Great Miami rivers on the north shore of the Ohio River. The city began as three settlements: Columbia, Losantiville, and North Bend.

Columbia, a mile west of the Little Miami River, was settled when a group of 26 people led by Benjamin Stites arrived on November 18, 1788. Stites had arranged parties of pioneers from New Jersey and Pennsylvania. They settled at the present site of Lunken Airport, where they built a blockhouse and log cabins, partially using wood from their flatboats. More people arrived over time, and more cabins were built. They struggled to get enough food to feed themselves and the new arrivals, but they did what they could by fishing, hunting, making a flour out of bear grass, farming, and acquiring some food from traders from Pittsburg. Of the three settlements, Columbia grew the fastest at first. It was initially the center of trading and the granary of the area. The first Protestant church (Baptist) in the Northwest Territory was erected in Columbia.

==== Losantiville ====
On December 28, 1788, eleven families with 24 men landed across from Licking River at what would be Sycamore Street and at present-day Yeatman's Cove. Losantiville, the central settlement, was named by the original surveyor, John Filson, who scouted the area on September 22, 1788, with Mathias Denman, and Colonel Robert Patterson. The name which means "The city opposite the mouth of the river" is composed of four terms, each of different language. (Note: Losantiville is made up of: "ville" is French for "city", "anti" is Greek for "opposite", "os" is Latin for "mouth", and "L" was all that was included of "Licking River".) Filson disappeared in October 1788, perhaps killed by Native Americans. The group, led by Patterson, who founded Lexington, Kentucky, originated in Limestone (now Maysville, Kentucky). When they arrived, Israel Ludlow became the settlement's surveyor and he laid out the town in a grid plan, which went from Northern Row (now Seventh Street) to the river, where land was set aside for a public landing. Its eastern and western borders are now Central Avenue and Broadway.

Before April 1, 1789, 30 lots were given to people so the settlement would grow. It was attractive for its town layout along the waterfront. Aside from what they attained through hunting and fishing, they grew corn, beans, squash, cucumbers, and pumpkin. The town soon had a tavern and ferry service that carried people across the Ohio River to Kentucky. A justice of the peace, William McMillan was installed.

By 1790, there were 700 people in the town due to an influx of new settlers and military troops posted at Fort Washington. Symmes wrote that Losantiville, then a settlement of forty two-story log houses, "assumes the appearance of a town of some respectability".

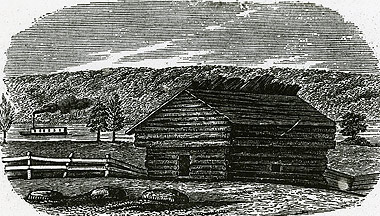
North Bend blockhouse illustration from Henry Howe, Historical Collections of Ohio, 1847.

North Bend on the Great Miami and a few miles west of Losantiville was founded by Symmes in February 1789. He had arranged a group of pioneers from Limestone, Kentucky that included soldiers and his family members to travel to the area. Like the people of Columbia and Losantiville, North Bend settlers struggled to get enough food initially. North Bend provided 24 lots to new settlers by May 1789.

=== Fort Washington ===
Symmes and St. Clair were concerned about Native American tribes, who would provide resistance to settlement by whites. There were over 260,000 square miles of the Northwest Territory—including the present-day states of Illinois, Indiana, Ohio, Michigan, Minnesota, and Wisconsin—that were protected by just 300 soldiers of the First Infantry Regiment. Native American tribes of the Ohio Valley were hostile to the encroachment by white people and there were "back-and-forth raids" among the cohabitating peoples. Most of the Native Americans in the Northwest Territory received aid from the British and generally sided with them—and they were not party to the Treaty of Paris (1783) that ceded land to the United States.

In 1789, Fort Washington was constructed under the direction of General Josiah Harmar and was named in honor of President George Washington. It was built in the north-east corner of Losantiville and served all of the Northwest Territory for five years. During that time, 613 troops under the command of St. Clair were lost during a battle with Miami chief Little Turtle. The Treaty of Greenville was signed in 1795 after Major General Anthony Wayne won the Battle of Fallen Timbers. The fort, no longer needed, was torn down in 1808.

=== Society of Cincinnati ===
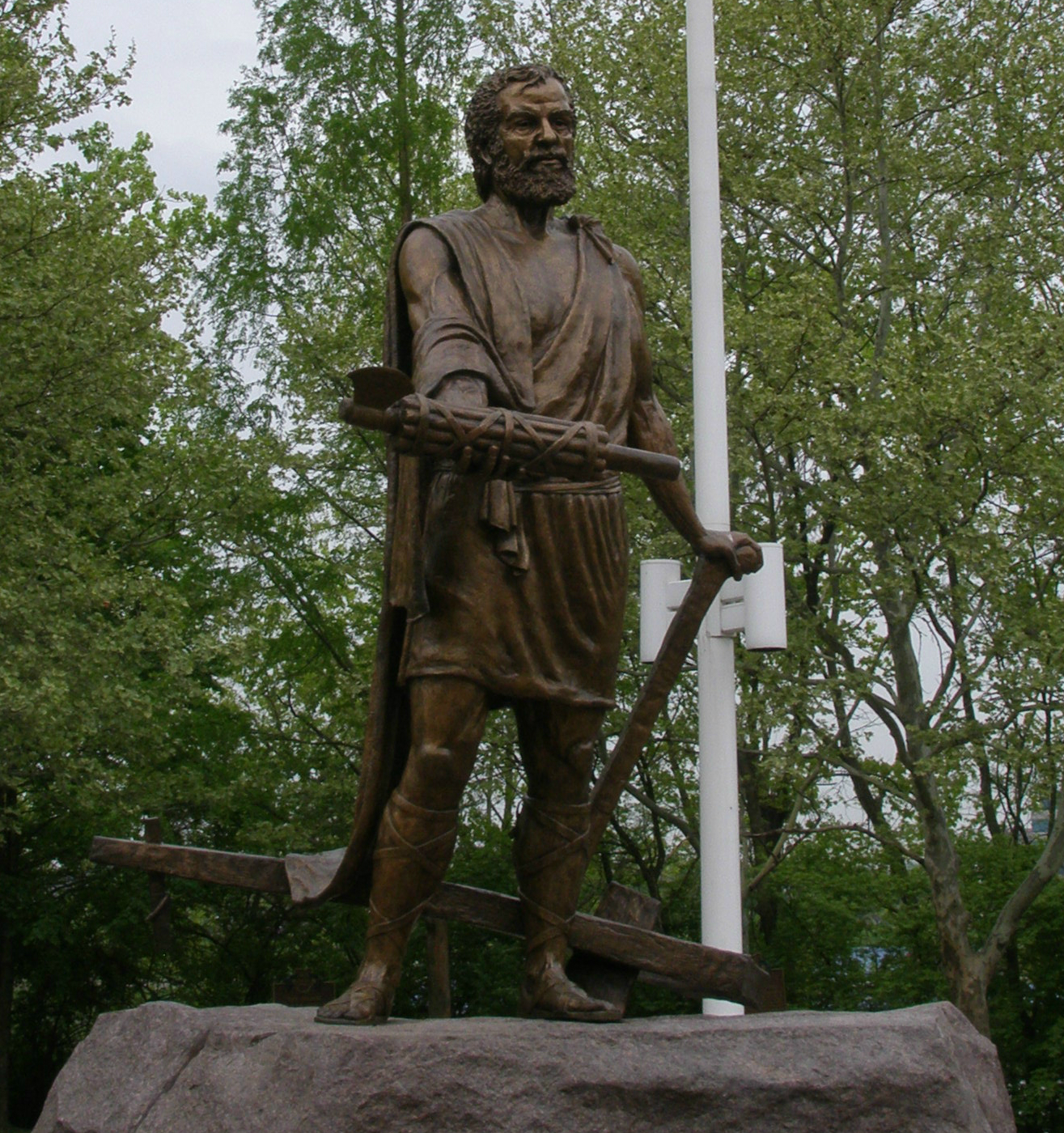
Cincinnatus statue at Sawyer Point Park

On January 4, 1790, Arthur St. Clair, the governor of the Northwest Territory, changed the name of the settlement to "Cincinnati" in honor of the Society of the Cincinnati, of which he was president, possibly at the suggestion of the surveyor Israel Ludlow. The society gets its name from Cincinnatus, the Roman general and farmer who saved the city of Rome from destruction and then quietly retired to his farm. (Note: Cincinnati's connection with Rome still exists today through its nickname of "The City of Seven Hills" (a phrase commonly associated with Rome) and the town twinning program of Sister Cities International.) The society was composed of Continental Army officers of the Revolutionary War.

=== Early settlers ===
Among the settlers, rabbit and deer pelts were used to barter for goods.

Cincinnati was populated by Revolutionary War soldiers who were granted lands in the state. This included men like John Cleves Symmes who acquired large parcels of land and sold off tracts for a profit. Some former officers were given large parcels of land in payment for their service. There were also civilians that came to the area seeking an opportunity for a successful life based upon the purchase of affordable land.

Hamilton County was established on January 4, 1790, by Arthur St. Clair. Tensions between pioneers and Native Americans increased over time, and Hamilton County issued a proclamation forbidding reckless shooting and barring the sale of liquor to Native Americans. All men were subject to military duty and people made preparations to defend their settlements. In addition, more soldiers arrived at Fort Washington. Some people moved to safer Kentucky communities in 1790.

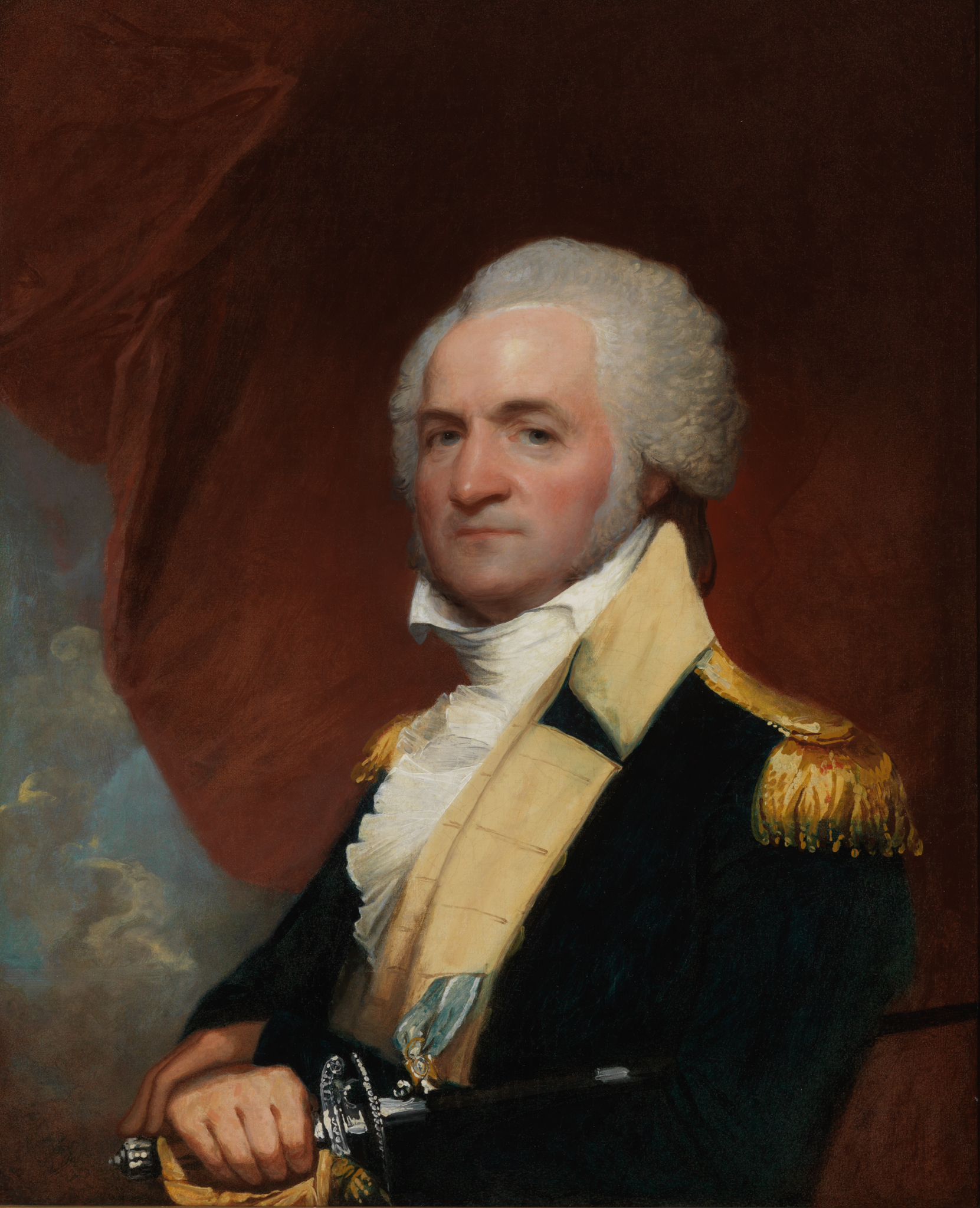
1805 portrait of Winthrop Sargent by Gilbert Stuart

The frontier town had houses of ill-repute and a number of taverns, neither of which were regulated and were frequented by the fort's soldiers. Winthrop Sargent, the Northwest Territory Secretary beginning in 1787 and for a time was acting governor, found the city's residents were "licentious" and "extremely debauched". He issued a proclamation in 1790 to ban the sale of liquor to soldiers. There was not support, though, from the townspeople to regulate business at bordellos and taverns. He was "so despised by his own men that his home was the subject of artillery practice while he was away." A sheriff was hired and a court was established, but the sheriff was generally unable to maintain control within Cincinnati. This was due to drunkenness of the fort's soldiers and tensions with the Shawnee and other local Native Americans. Often the military established martial law to maintain order.

The population of the settlement grew, and a wide range of businesses were established by 1795, including furniture manufacturers, a butcher, a brewer, and a French pastry chef. To meet the needs of pioneers and soldiers heading west on the Ohio River, there were 30 warehouses that supplies the needs of the travelers.

Cincinnati was chartered as a town on January 1, 1802. Cincinnati established James Smith as the first town marshall; the following year the town started a "night watch". There were about 1,000 civilian residents in 1803, the military abandoned Fort Washington. By 1820, there were nearly 10,000 residents. The introduction of steam navigation on the Ohio River in 1811 helped the city grow.

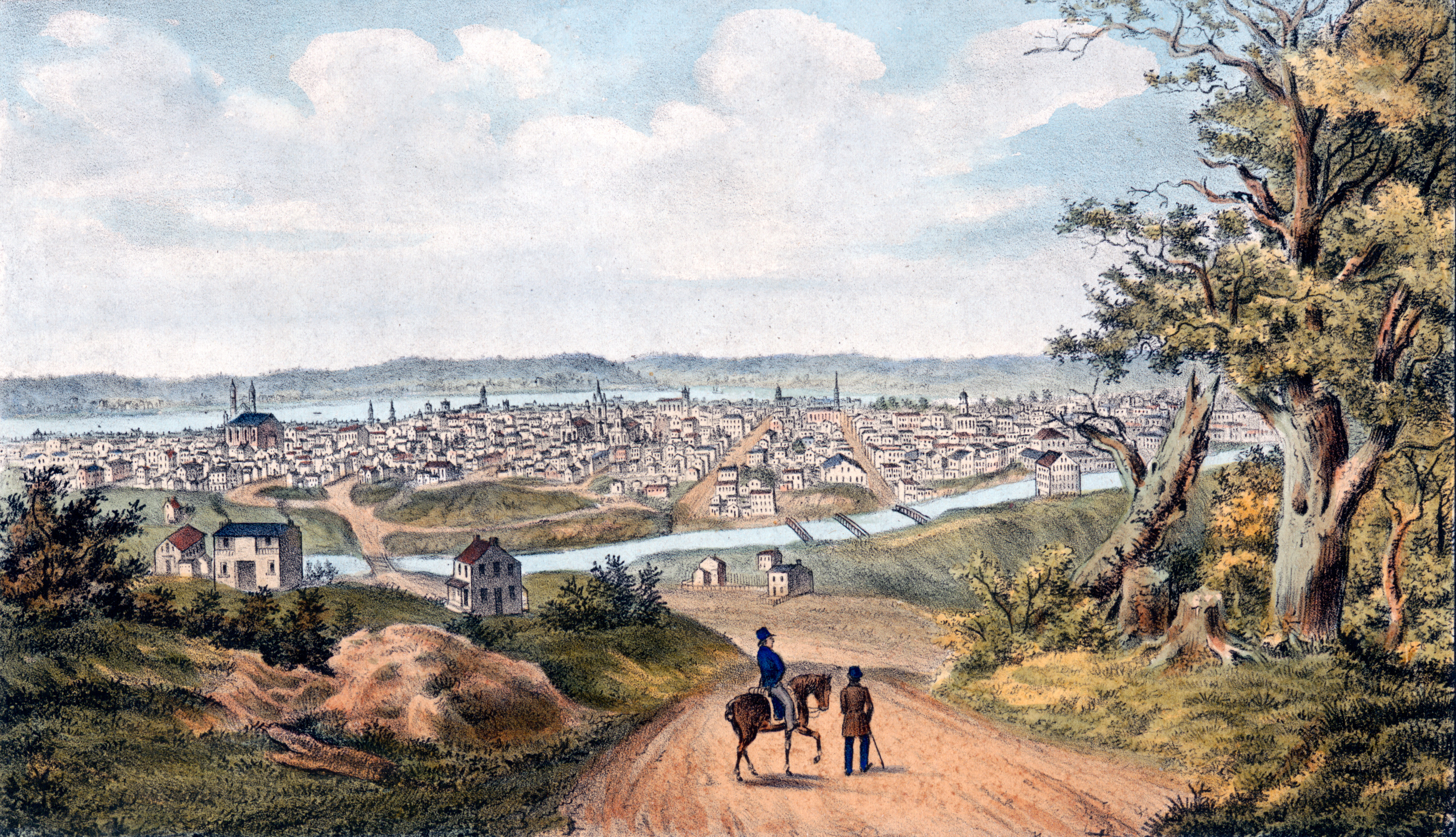
The Miami and Erie Canal figures prominently in this 1841 lithograph view of Cincinnati

In addition to providing supplies for travelers, in the early 19th century there was a wide range of service-based businesses—including restaurants, taverns, and hotels—to meet traveler's needs. Transportation on the Ohio River also assisted in the city's growth. Crops were sent to one of Ohio's major markets, New Orleans, along the Ohio and Mississippi Rivers. Transportation costs were reduced for shipping crops or goods from western Ohio to Cincinnati due to the Miami and Erie Canal. Steamboats were repaired and built in the city. It became a meatpacking center, where livestock was slaughtered and butchered and sold in Cincinnati or shipped. Cincinnati became known as the "Porkopolis" when it became the pork-processing center of the country.

== Incorporation and pre-Civil War ==
The corporate seal of the City of Cincinnati, Ohio, United States. The area was settled in 1788, the settlements became the town of Cincinnati, and it was chartered as a city in 1819. This version of the seal was in use by 1861.

It was chartered as a city by an act of the General Assembly that passed February 5, 1819, and took effect on March 1 of that year. The same year, Cincinnati began publishing city directories, listing the names of the residents, their occupations, and their residential addresses. These old directories remain a valuable resource for people seeking information about early residents. The Medical College of Ohio was founded by Daniel Drake in 1819.

It was the sixth-largest city in the country, with a population of 115,435, by 1850. In 1850 it was the first city in the United States to establish a Jewish Hospital.

=== Police and fire services ===
In 1819, when Cincinnati was incorporated as a city, the first city marshal, William Ruffin, was appointed. In May 1828, the police force consisted of one captain, one assistant, and five patrolmen. By 1850, the city authorized positions for a police chief and six lieutenants, but it was 1853 before the first police chief, Jacob Keifer, was appointed and he was dismissed after 3 weeks.

Cincinnati accompanied its growth by paying men to act as its Cincinnati Fire Department in 1853, making the first full-time paid fire department in the United States. It was the first in the world to use steam fire engines.

=== Abolitionists and the Underground Railroad ===
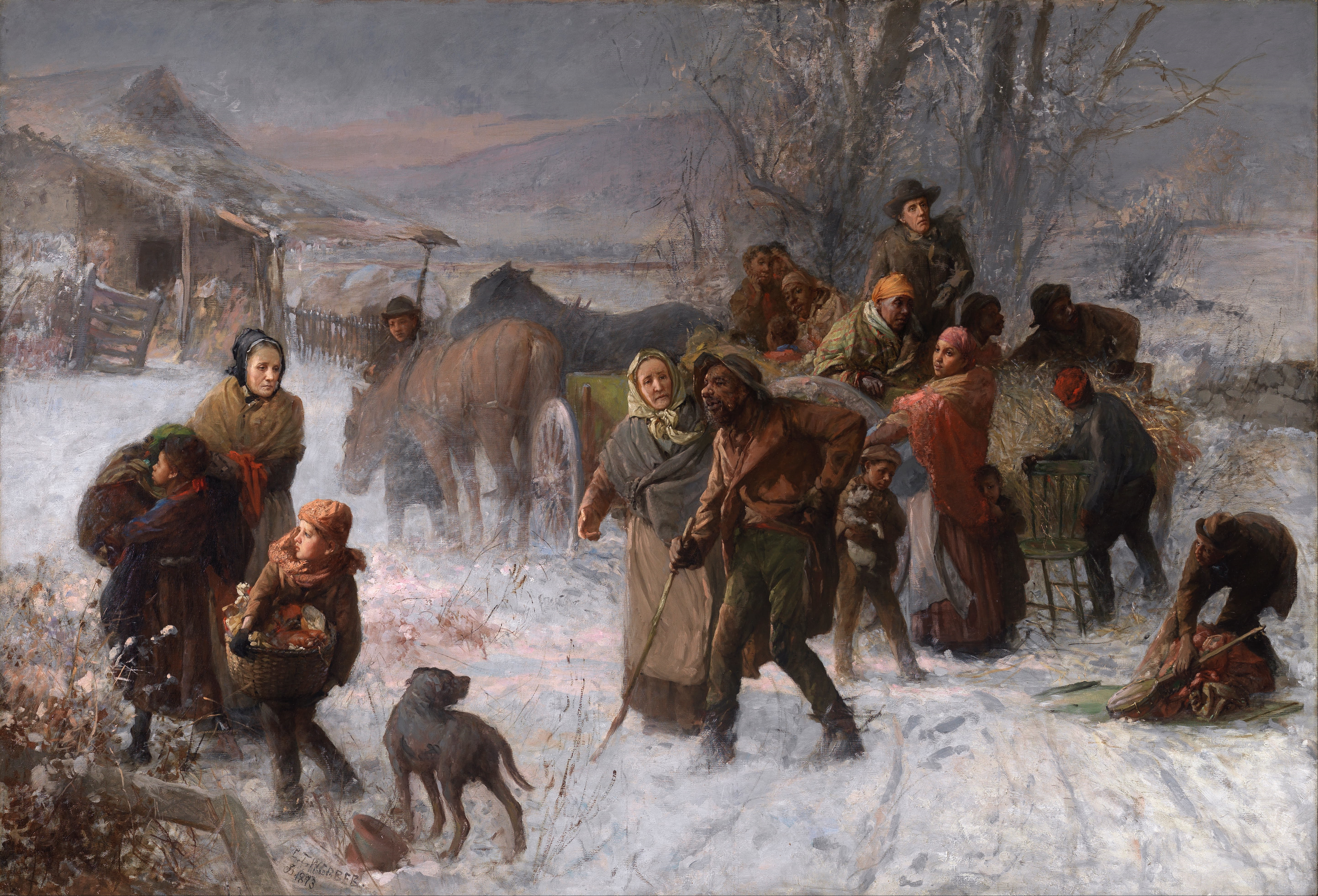
Charles T. Webber, The Underground Railroad, 1893, Cincinnati Art Museum

Cincinnati was an important stop for the Underground Railroad in pre-Civil War times. It bordered a southern slave state, Kentucky, and is often mentioned as a destination for many people escaping the bonds of slavery. There are many harrowing stories involving abolitionists, runaways, slave traders and free men.

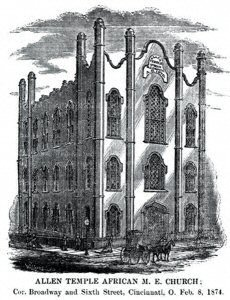
Allen Temple African Methodist Episcopal Church

Allen Temple African Methodist Episcopal Church was founded in 1824 as the first Black church in Ohio. It was an important stop on the Underground Railroad for many years. It seeded many other congregations in the city, across the state, and throughout the Midwest.

Lane Theological Seminary was established in the Walnut Hills section of Cincinnati in 1829 to educate Presbyterian ministers. Prominent New England pastor Lyman Beecher moved his family (Harriet and son Henry) from Boston to Cincinnati to become the first President of the Seminary in 1832.

Lane Seminary is known primarily for the "debates" held there in 1834 that influenced the nation's thinking about slavery. Several of those involved went on to play an important role in the abolitionist movement and the buildup to the American Civil War.

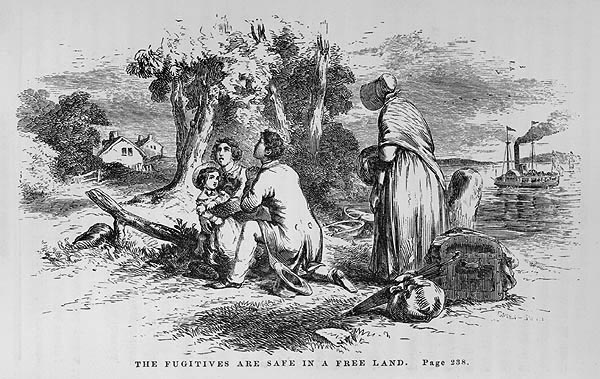
Hammatt Billings, "The Fugitives are Safe in a Free Land" for Harriet Beecher Stowe's Uncle Tom's Cabin (1852). It shows characters of George Harris, Eliza, Harry, and Mrs. Smyth.

Abolitionist author Harriet Beecher Stowe lived in Cincinnati for part of her life. She wrote Uncle Tom's Cabin, first published on March 20, 1852. The book was the best-selling novel of the 19th century (and the second best-selling book of the century after the Bible) and is credited with helping to fuel the abolitionist cause in the United States prior to the American Civil War. In the first year after it was published, 300,000 copies of the book were sold. In his 1985 book Uncle Tom's Cabin and American Culture, Thomas Gossett observed that "in 1872 a biographer of Horace Greeley would argue that the chief force in developing support for the Republican Party in the 1850s had been Uncle Tom's Cabin." The Harriet Beecher Stowe House in Cincinnati is located at 2950 Gilbert Avenue, and it is open to the public.

The National Underground Railroad Freedom Center, located in downtown Cincinnati on the banks of the Ohio River, largely focuses on the history of slavery in the U.S., but has an underlying mission of promoting freedom in a contemporary fashion for the world. Its grand opening ceremony in 2002 was a gala event involving many national stars, musical acts, fireworks, and a visit from the current First Lady of the United States. It is physically located between Great American Ballpark and Paycor Stadium, which were both built and opened shortly before the Freedom Center was opened.

=== Race relations before the Civil War ===
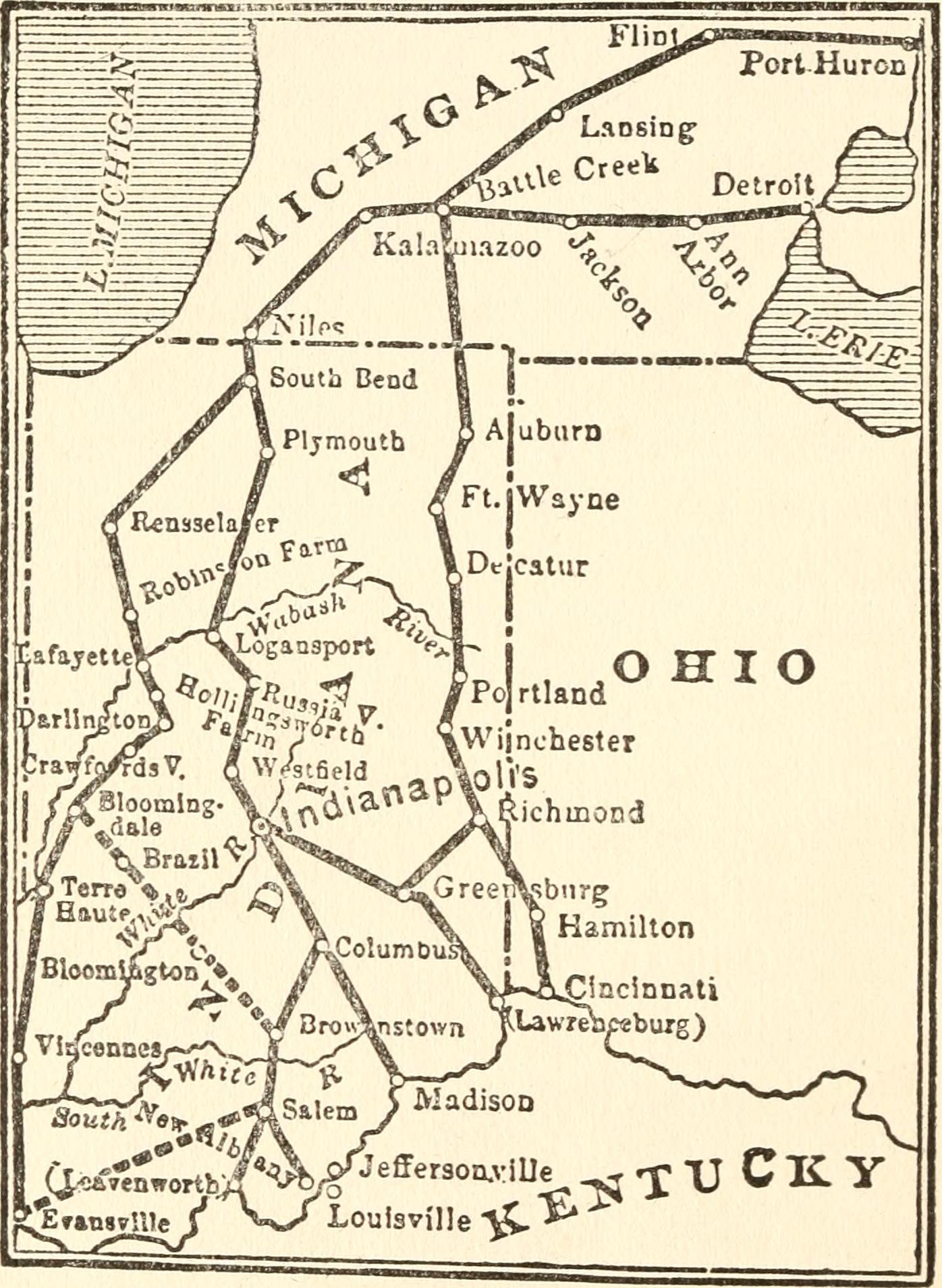
Underground Railroad map, which shows the northerly route from Cincinnati.

Situated across the Ohio River from the southern border state of Kentucky, which allowed slavery, while slavery was illegal in Ohio, Cincinnati was a natural destination or part of a northerly route for people escaping slavery. Anti-slavery tracts and newspapers were published in Cincinnati to send to the South.

There were some people that were concerned that blacks would compete with them for jobs. Tension built when people perceived that blacks were infringing on opportunities available to white or becoming powerful. For instance, Irish immigrants believed that blacks were taking their job opportunities in 1829. The Cincinnati Riots of 1829 broke out in July and August 1829 as whites attacked blacks in the city. Many of the latter had come from the South to establish a community with more freedom. Some 1200 blacks left the city as a result of rioting and resettled in Canada. Blacks in other areas tried to raise money to help people who wanted to relocate to Canada. The riot was a topic of discussion in 1830 among representatives of seven states at the first Negro Convention, led by Bishop Richard Allen and held in Philadelphia, Pennsylvania.

As the anti-slavery movement grew, there were more riots in 1836, when whites attacked a press run by James Birney, who had started publishing the anti-slavery weekly The Philanthropist. The mob grew to 700 and also attacked black neighborhoods and people. Another riot occurred in 1841.

Irish and German immigrants settled in Cincinnati and beginning in the 1830s there were some people who did not accept people of other backgrounds. They were targeted by the temperance movement because they were perceived to be heavy drinkers. See Cincinnati Nativist Riots of 1855.

=== Nicknames ===
Cincinnati was first called "Queen of the West" in 1819 by Ed. B. Cooke who wrote "The City is, indeed, justly styled the fair Queen of the West: distinguished for order, enterprise, public spirit, and liberality, she stands the wonder of an admiring world." It was published in the Cincinnati Advertiser and the Inquisitor. The following year the city's residents began referring to the city as The Queen of the West or The Queen City.

Henry Wadsworth Longfellow wrote of the vineyards in Cincinnati of Nicholas Longworth in the last stanza of his poem Catawba Wine in 1854:

And this Song of the Vine,
This greeting of mine,
The winds and the birds shall deliver,
To the Queen of the West,
In her garlands dressed,
On the banks of the Beautiful River.

The nickname "Porkopolis" was first published about 1840, but had its beginning in 1825 when banker George W. Jones, who had often talked of the number of hogs roaming the streets for slaughter, received a paper mache pig and was dubbed to have been from Porkopolis. In 1840, there was more than $3 million of packed pork produced by 1,200 men in 48 packing houses in Cincinnati. Twenty years later, there were twice the number of men involved in the business. Chicago became the major meat packing center of pigs and took over the nickname by 1875.

Cincinnati also is known as the "City of Seven Hills". The hills form a crescent from the east bank of the Ohio River to the west bank: Mount Adams, Mount Auburn, Vine Street Hill, Fairview, Fairmount, Mount Harrison, and Price Hill.

Cincinnati riverfront from Newport, Kentucky, 1848.

== Civil War ==
During the American Civil War, many people in the area were "Southern sympathizers" due to Cincinnati's commerce with slave states and history of settlement by southerners from eastern states. Of the people who served in the military, most enlisted with the Union Army, but large numbers served the Confederates. Some residents participated in the Copperhead movement in Ohio.

Cincinnati played a key role as a major source of supplies and troops for the Union Army; It also provided housing for soldiers and their families, both of which were good for the city's economy. The United States Christian Commission, United States Sanitary Commission, and other charities came to the area to assist soldiers and their families. It served as the headquarters for much of the war for the Department of the Ohio, which was charged with the defense of the region, as well as directing the army's offensive into Kentucky and Tennessee.

In July 1863, the Union Army instituted martial law in Cincinnati due to the imminent danger posed by the Confederate Morgan's Raiders. Bringing the war to the North, they attacked several outlying villages, such as Cheviot and Montgomery.

A mural depicting the "Squirrel Hunters", local militia from Ohio, marching in Defense of Cincinnati (1862). (Note: Forces established to defend Cincinnati did not need to fire a shot during the Civil War.)

During the American Civil War, an eight-mile line of defense was built by Cincinnatians along the Ohio River to protect the city. One of the batteries, Battery Hooper, became the site of the James A. Ramage Civil War Museum in Fort Wright, Kentucky. Due to the efforts of the Black Brigade of Cincinnati and the Defense of Cincinnati, forces established to defend Cincinnati did not need to fire a shot during the Civil War.

== Post Civil War and late 19th-century history ==
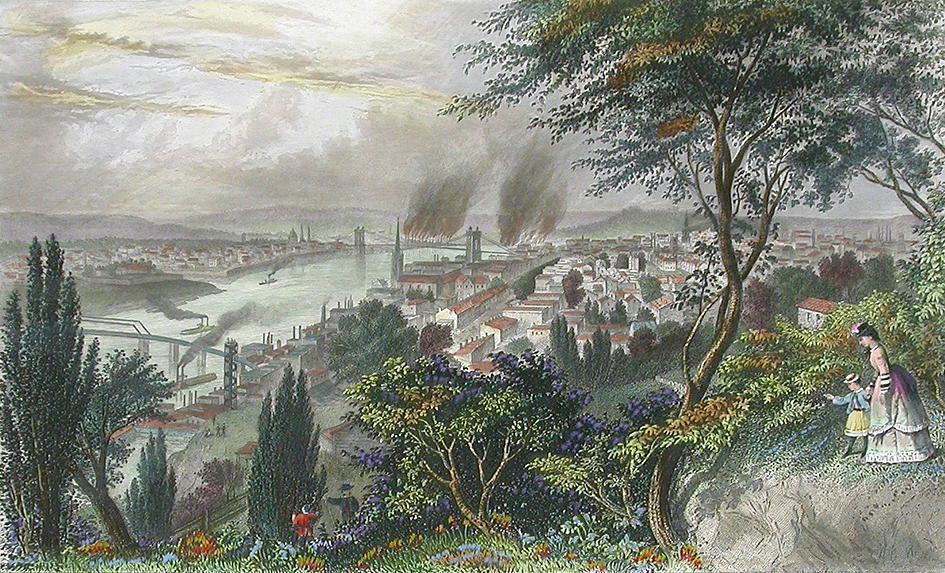
City of Cincinnati, 1872, a steel engraving by A. C. Warren

With nearly 300,000 people, it was the state's largest city, and it was the country's densest population with an average of 37,143 people per square mile.

The city had an art academy, art museum, Music Hall, opera house, Exposition Building, and a public library. There were about 130 magazines and newspapers produced in the city. There were more than 200 churches, five hospitals, and college education attainable through University of Cincinnati. In 1888, Cincinnati German Protestants community started a "sick house" ("Krankenhaus") staffed by deaconesses. It evolved into the city's first general hospital, and included nurses' training school. It was renamed Deaconess Hospital in 1917.

Thirteen governors for the state of Ohio came from Cincinnati: Charles Anderson, Richard M. Bishop, John Brough, Ethan Allen Brown, Salmon P. Chase, Jacob Cox, William Dennison Jr., Joseph B. Foraker, Rutherford B. Hayes, George Hoadly, Othniel Looker, Edward Noyes, and Thomas L. Young.

=== Sports ===
The Cincinnati Red Stockings, a baseball team whose name and heritage inspired today's Cincinnati Reds, began their career in the 19th century as well. In 1868, meetings were held at the law offices of Tilden, Sherman, and Moulton to make Cincinnati's baseball team a professional one; it became the first regular professional team in the country in 1869. In its first year, the team won 57 games and tied one, giving it the best winning record of any professional baseball team in history.

=== Commerce ===
King's Pocket-book of Cincinnati; John Shillito & Co.

In 1879, Procter & Gamble, one of Cincinnati's major soap manufacturers, began marketing Ivory Soap. It was marketed as "light enough to float." After a fire at the first factory, Procter & Gamble moved to a new factory on the Mill Creek and renewed soap production. The area became known as Ivorydale. Cincinnati was the first municipality to own a railroad, the Cincinnati Southern in 1880.

In 1887, industries in Cincinnati produced more than 200 million dollars in goods and employed 103,325 people. It had become "an important industrial, political, literary, and educational center in both Ohio and the United States" by 1890. By the end of the 19th century, its leading industries were iron production, woodworking, cloth production, and meatpacking.

Cincinnati had a monopoly in the late 19th century because local manufacturers were able to build inexpensive carriages that opened the market to a larger pool of potential customers, such as farmers who would otherwise use a farm wagon for pleasure travel but were able to afford the inexpensive carriages.

== 20th and 21st century ==
The city's population did not increase much over the 20th century. In the 1880s there were 300,000 people and in 2000 there were 365,000 people living within 77 square miles. But, there are more than 1.8 million people living in Cincinnati's suburbs.

Within the greater Cincinnati area, there are more than 100 art galleries, including the Contemporary Arts Center, Cincinnati Art Museum, and Taft Museum of Art. The city's theaters include Aronoff Center for the Arts, the Playhouse in the Park, the Showboat Majestic, the Emery Theatre, the Taft Theatre, and the University of Cincinnati – College-Conservatory of Music. The city also has the Cincinnati Zoo and Botanical Garden.

=== World War I ===
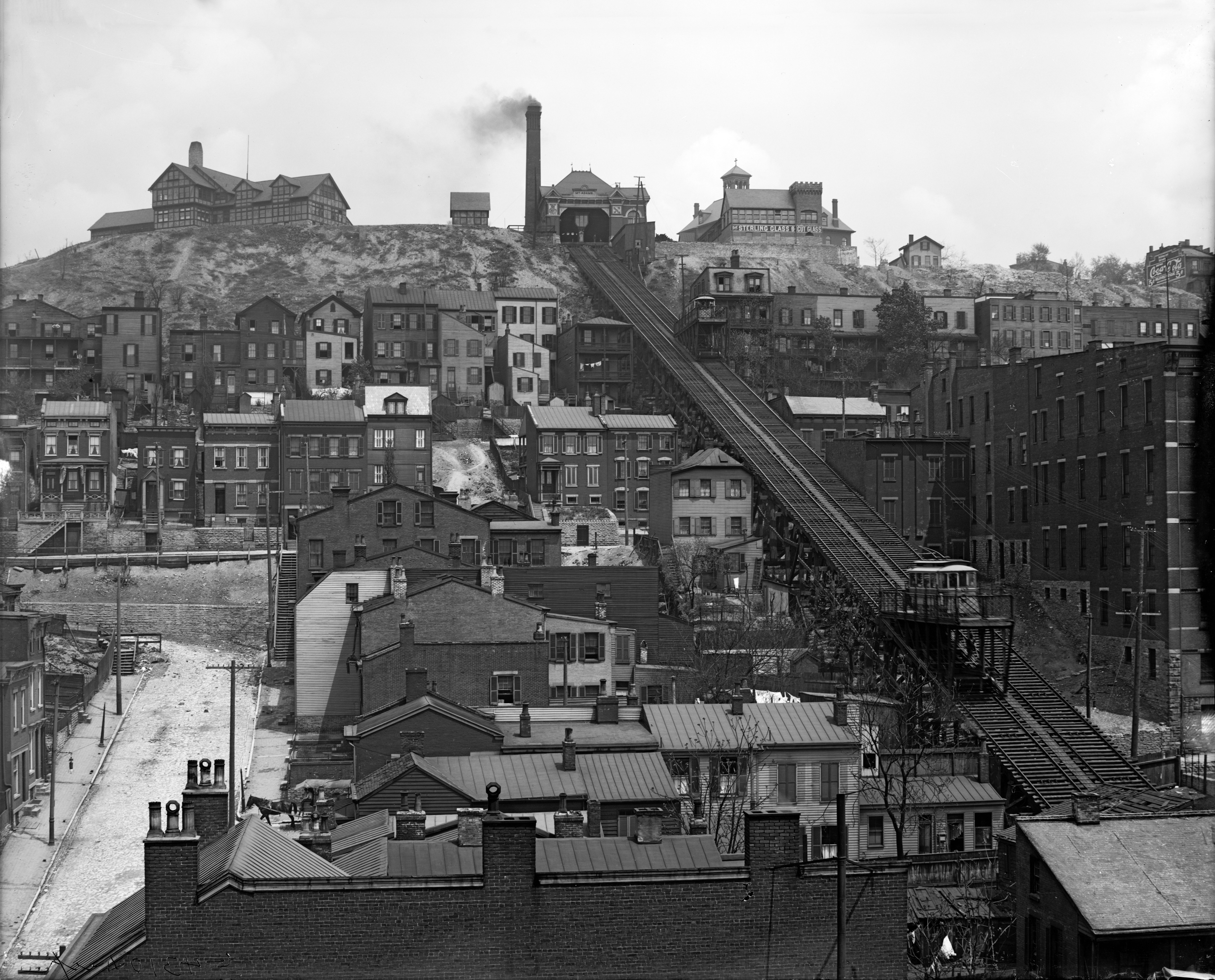
Mount Adams Incline c. 1905

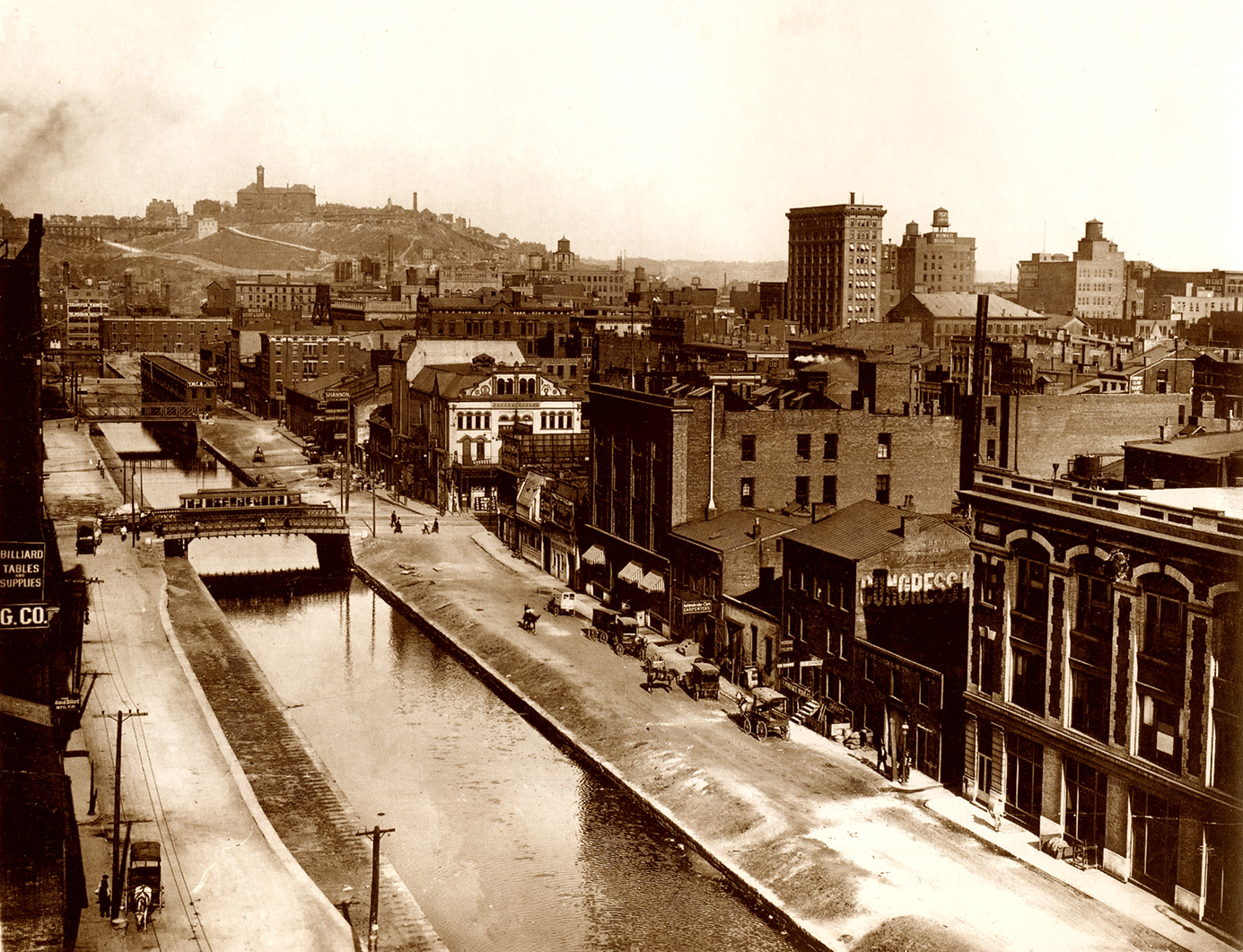
Over-the-Rhine in 1914

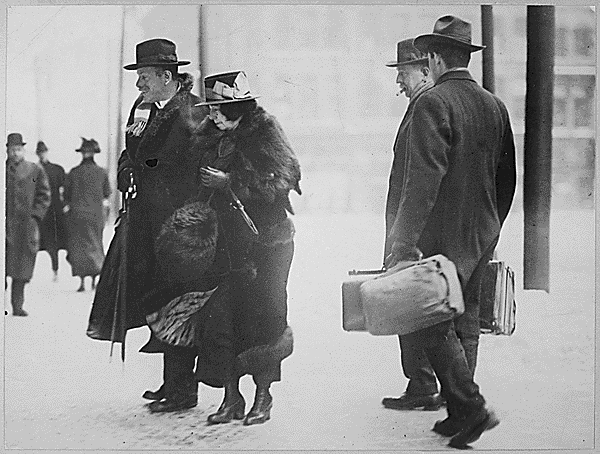
Doctor Ernst Kunwald, former conductor of the Cincinnati Symphony Orchestra, entering the Federal Building, Cincinnati, Ohio, as a prisoner of war

During World War I (1914–1918), 25,000 men from Cincinnati served in the military. Cincinnati's citizens and children found many ways to support the war effort, such as "adopting" 1,200 fatherless French children, collecting tin foil, planting war gardens, establishing home guards to pick up local responsibilities by the militia, rolling bandages and knitting tens of thousands of articles of clothing. The Cincinnati Training Battalion was established so that men that expected to be drafted could get a head start on training. Jewish men beyond draft age prepared to serve in Palestine. Local plants retrofitted their factories to produce items required by the war or increased production to turn out needed supplies. As a result, Cincinnati turned out munitions, camping equipment for soldiers, battleship parts, clothing and food for soldiers, and other necessary goods. Millions of dollars were raised for Liberty Loans; relief funds for Armenia, Belgium and France, the Red Cross; thrift stamps; and the YMCA. Women took positions formerly held by men and African-Americans moved to Cincinnati from the South.

Anti-German sentiment raised to a fevered pitch, though, during the war. Rumors were spread about German-American businesses. The conductor of the Cincinnati Symphony Orchestra, Ernst Kunwald, was interned under the Alien and Sedition Acts. Professor Emil Heerman, the concertmeister, was released into the custody of the Conservatory of Music after he was arrested; He invested 75% of his income in Liberty Bonds, which helped restore much of his reputation. The city's library removed pro-German books and the public schools discontinued German language classes.

=== World War II ===
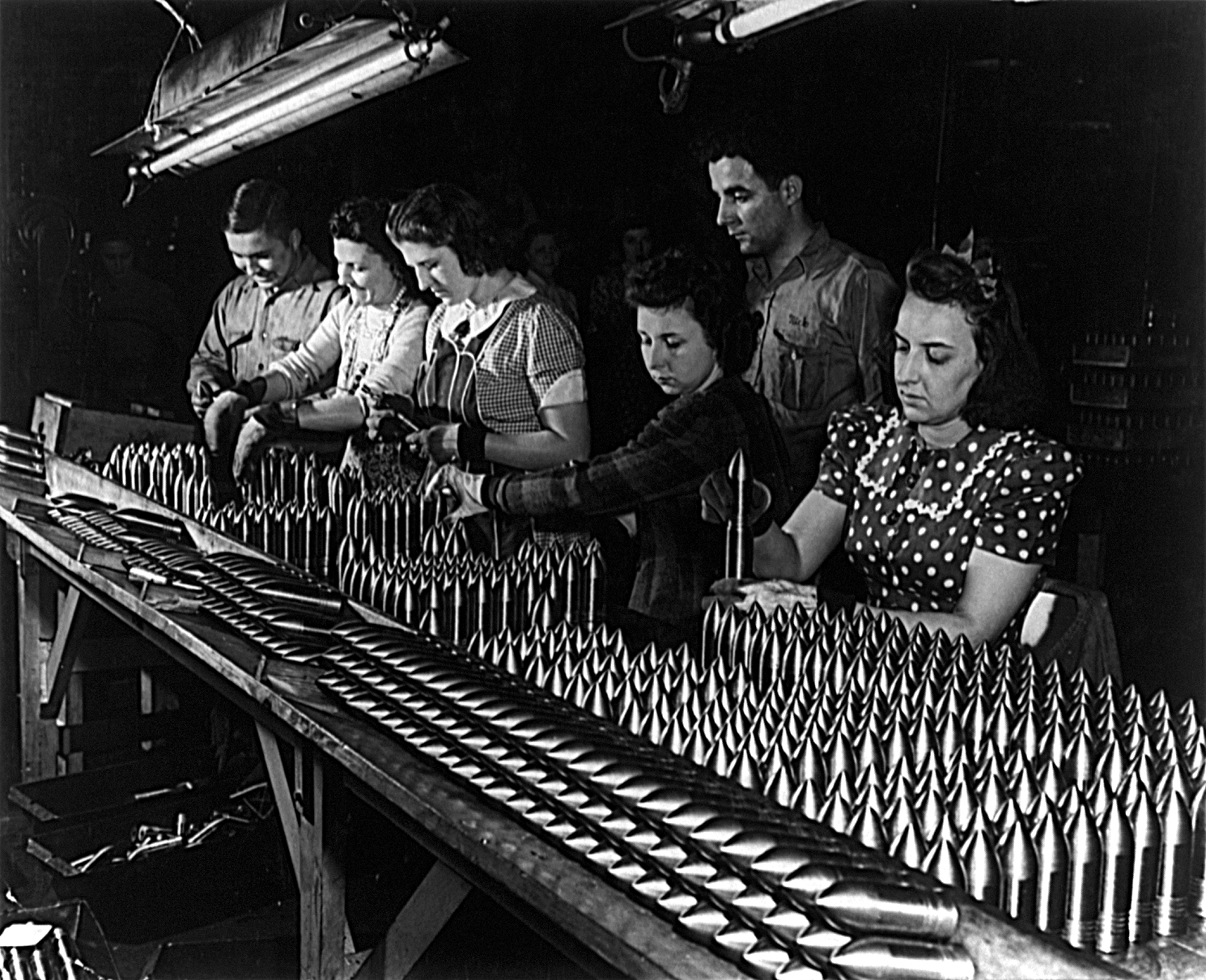
Women made 37mm antitank shells for the war in 1942 at Aluminum Industries, Inc. in Cincinnati.

Due to isolationism and disillusion that the world was not "safe for democracy" after World War I, many people were initially reluctant to become involved in World War II (1939–1945) until the attack on Pearl Harbor (December 7, 1941). Others, though, had felt for a while that it was in the best interest of the United States to enter the war. Secretary of War, Henry L. Stimson, said "My first feeling was of relief that the indecision was over and that a crisis had come in a way which would unite all our people."

During the war, the regional draft boards registered 81,000 men in October 1940. Volunteers and those who were drafted reported to Fort Thomas in Kentucky. Almost 100,000 men and women from the area served in the war. Women served in support roles, like radio operator and driver. African-Americans served in segregated units, like the 93rd Infantry Division. The war provided opportunities for blacks and women to progress in ways that they were unable to before the war. For instance, generally the workforce was made up of single women. During the war, women were needed in military positions and in civilian positions to staff the production effort. More black men were accepted into the military to meet manpower needs or worked in plants. People from the area also served in the diplomatic corps or in federal agencies.

In Cincinnati, 2,000 manufacturers, with more than 180,000 employees, rallied to provide goods required by the military. The largest subcontractor, Wright Aeronautical Corporation, produced engines for military planes. The war effort required goods like food, soap, clothing, glycerine – some of which required some modification to meet the military's needs, such as ties made out of khaki-colored material. Some completely changed the products they produced, like switching from making women's clothing to producing parachutes. Tank turrets and armor plates were made by Mosler Safe, a metal working plant. Cincinnati was positioned with a number of options for transporting raw materials and goods, including the railroad through Union Terminal, barges on the Ohio River, airplanes at Lunken Field.

As in World War I, Cincinnatians rallied to support the war. They planted victory gardens, organized bond drives, bought bonds, and retooled factories. Goods were collected that were needed for the war, such as rubber and various types of scrap metal (e.g., copper, iron, etc.). There were also conservation efforts that helped ensure that necessary goods were available to meet the military's needs. Local boards issued ration books for scarce consumable products, like butter, meat, sugar, coffee, gasoline, and tires.

A defense council was established in May 1941 to plan for civilian protection and was led by Phillip O. Geier, the president of the Cincinnati Chamber of Commerce.

=== Modern urban development ===
In 1902, the world's first reinforced concrete skyscraper was built, the Ingalls Building. Cincinnati Subway broke ground in January 1920. After World War II, Cincinnati unveiled a master plan for urban renewal that resulted in modernization of the inner city. Since the 1950s, $250 million was spent on improving neighborhoods, building clean and safe low- and moderate-income housing, provide jobs and stimulate economic growth.

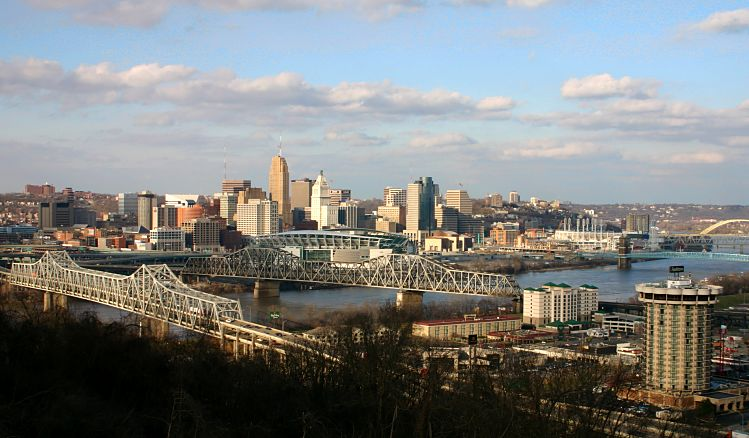
Cincinnati skyline, 2005. This view is from the Southwest, from Devou Park in Covington.

The City of Cincinnati and Hamilton County developed the Banks – an urban neighborhood along the city's riverfront including restaurants, clubs, offices, and homes with skyline views. Groundbreaking took place on April 2, 2008. Adjacent is Smale Riverfront Park, a "front porch" to Ohio.

A 3.6-mile streetcar line running through downtown and Over the Rhine was completed in 2015 and called the Cincinnati Bell Connector.

=== Commerce ===
American Financial Group, Cinergy, Kroger, Procter & Gamble, E. W. Scripps Company, and Totes Isotoner are among the corporations that have their regional or national headquarters in the city.

=== Sports ===
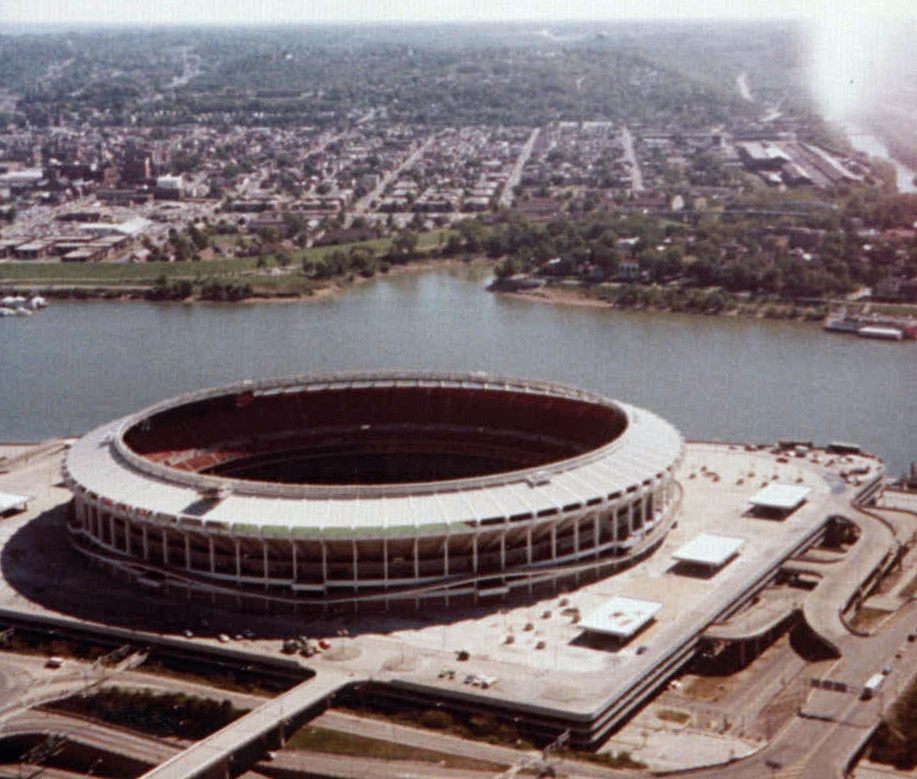
Riverfront Stadium

In 1935, major league baseball's first night game was played at Crosley Field.

In 1970 and 1975, the city completed Riverfront Stadium and Riverfront Coliseum, respectively, as the Cincinnati Reds baseball team emerged as one of the dominant teams of the decade. In fact, the Big Red Machine of 1975 and 1976 is considered by many to be one of the best baseball teams to ever play the game. Three key players on the team (Johnny Bench, Tony Pérez, and Joe Morgan), as well as manager Sparky Anderson, were elected to the Baseball Hall of Fame, while a fourth, Pete Rose, still holds the title for the most hits (4,256), singles (3,215), games played (3,562), games played in which his team won (1,971), at-bats (14,053) and outs (10,328) in baseball history.

The Cincinnati Bengals football team of the NFL was founded in 1968 by legendary coach Paul Brown. The team has three Super Bowl appearances in 1981, 1988, and 2021.

FC Cincinnati, Cincinnati's professional soccer team, was founded in 2015 as a member of the United Soccer League, now known as the USL Championship, and played its first season in 2016. During its three seasons in a division II league, the club received international recognition for its consistent record-breaking attendance numbers and historic 2017 Lamar Hunt U.S. Open Cup run. The team's ownership group was granted a Major League Soccer franchise that started play under the FC Cincinnati name in 2019; the USL team accordingly ceased operations after the 2018 season.

=== Boy Scouts ===
"The Sons of Daniel Boone", a forerunner to the Boy Scouts of America, began in Cincinnati in 1905. Because of the city's rich German heritage, the pre-prohibition era allowed Cincinnati to become a national forerunner in the brewing industry.

=== Media ===
During experimentation for six years (until 1939), Cincinnati's AM radio station, WLW was the first to broadcast at 500,000 watts. In 1943, King Records (and its subsidiary, Queen Records) was founded, and went on to record early music by artists who became highly successful and influential in Country, R&B, and Rock. WCET-TV was the first licensed public television station, established in 1954. Cincinnati is home to radio's WEBN 102.7 FM, the longest-running album-oriented rock station in the United States, first airing in 1967. In 1976, the Cincinnati Stock Exchange became the nation's first all-electronic trading market.

=== Race relations ===
There have been many incidents of race-based violence before and after the Civil War with the most notable and most recent one being the 2001 Cincinnati Riots.

=== Disasters ===
Cincinnati has experienced multiple floods in its history. The largest being the Ohio River flood of 1937 where the hydrograph measured a river depth of 80 feet—55 feet above normal levels.

On December 3, 1979, 11 persons were killed in a crowd crush at the entrance of Riverfront Coliseum for a rock concert by the British band The Who.

Being in the Midwest, Cincinnati has also experienced several violent tornadoes. Of the 1974 Super Outbreak tornadoes, a F5 crossed the Ohio River from northern Kentucky into Sayler Park, the westernmost portion of the city along the Ohio River. The tornado then continued north into the suburbs of Mack, Bridgetown and Dent before weakening. The parent thunderstorm went on to produce another violet F4 that touched down in Elmwood Place and Arlington Heights before leaving the city limits and tracking toward Mason, Ohio. Three people lost their lives, while over another 100 were injured in both of these tornadoes. In the early morning hours of April 9, 1999, another violent tornado grazed the Cincinnati Metro, in the suburb of Blue Ash. It was rated an F4 killing 4 residents.

== See also ==
- Timeline of Cincinnati
- History of Over-the-Rhine
- Cincinnati Township, Hamilton County, Ohio
- Millcreek Township, Hamilton County, Ohio
- Spencer Township, Hamilton County, Ohio
- Storrs Township, Hamilton County, Ohio

== Sources ==
- Cincinnati Firsts. Greater Cincinnati Convention and Visitors Bureau.
- Evolution of the National Weather Service. National Oceanic and Atmospheric Administration.
