= United States Military Lands =

The United States Military Lands were land grants given to Continental Army servicemen by the United States Congress for service in the American Revolutionary War.

The United States federal government was often short of money in the country's early decades. The government's efforts to raise additional money in the early 1790s had met with considerable resistance, most notably the Whiskey Rebellion which had been provoked by a federal tax on whiskey. Nevertheless, the Congress and the administration of President George Washington faced considerable pressure to provide pensions as promised for the veterans that had secured the young nation's independence. Besides cash, the federal government's only other asset of any value was federal land.

Beginning in 1796, the Congress provided 2.6 million acres (10,500 km²) of land to Army soldiers and officers, mainly within the Northwest Territory. The decision to offer federal lands to Revolutionary War veterans helped to establish a precedent that would be repeated throughout the 19th century in which, wherever feasible, land would be bartered by the federal government in lieu of making payment in cash.
