= Buddy Gray =

American political activist and social worker

Stanley "Buddy" Gray (1950 – 15 November 1996) was a political activist and social worker who lived in the Over-the-Rhine neighborhood of Cincinnati, Ohio who was part of a movement for low-income housing. He described himself as "a hard-nosed radical, a street fighter for street people." His allies saw him as a "humanitarian friend of the homeless," but his enemies saw "a poverty pimp" who wanted to turn Over-the-Rhine into a "super ghetto." Gray's legacy continues through the Drop Inn Center homeless shelter and ReSTOC, a low-income housing organization that later merged with another non-profit to form Over-the-Rhine Community Housing.

== Activism ==
Gray operated the Drop Inn Center in Over-the-Rhine, which provided food, clothing, and shelter but not conventional treatment for homeless alcoholics. Around the late 1970s he emerged as the leader for the rights of the poor in Over-the-Rhine, spending much of his life fighting historic preservationists who wanted to save Over-the-Rhine's deteriorating nineteenth century architecture. Gray believed preserving the buildings would lead to gentrification, which would involuntarily uproot the poor and push them out of their homes and neighborhood. Gray believed that regardless of what the city government and preservationists said they ultimately wanted to run his homeless shelter out of Over-the-Rhine and turn it into an "artsy-craftsy" neighborhood. He was not against preservation when it benefited the poor, as he was known to protest demolitions, some with acts of civil disobedience.

=== National Register controversy ===
In 1980, at the public hearing for Over-the-Rhine's nomination into the National Register of Historic Places, Gray rallied some 250 protesters to the event where he blasted urban renewal as "negro removal." There Gray and his allies were able to force a three-year delay on the Register's decision. In 1983 Gray used powerful political allies to lobby the National Register's board members, which resulted in Over-the-Rhine being rejected from the Register by a narrow 8 to 7 vote. However, preservationists appealed the board's decision to the keeper of the National Register, Carol Shull, who favored adding Over-the-Rhine to the Register. Despite several last-minute derailment attempts by Gray, Over-the-Rhine was added to the National Register in May 1983.

=== Low-income housing in Over-the-Rhine ===
Gray, having lost the National Register battle, vowed to make the expansion of low-income housing in Over-the-Rhine his top priority. In 1985 Gray pushed an "urban renewal plan" through city council that he presented as "a compromise" that would allow some upper-income residents to settle in Over-the-Rhine. However, the plan made additional low-income housing such a high priority that it was not likely to yield much mixed-income residential or commercial development.

The main critic of the plan was Jim Tarbell, an Over-the-Rhine resident and entrepreneur, who after 1983 would emerge as the leading opponent of Buddy Gray. Tarbell wanted to help the poor who cared, but believed social activists like Gray were "naively sympathetic" to the "sloppy people" who "threw garbage out of windows, played loud music night and day, got drunk in the street, and let small children roam the streets unattended." Gray, on the other hand, assumed the poor had chosen a lifestyle of poverty, and for that reason should be separated from others who had not chosen a similar lifestyle. Tarbell rejected that view and argued that the 1985 plan denied the poor ready access to alternative lifestyles.

No one seriously challenged Gray's 1985 plan until 1992 when Housing Opportunities Made Equal (HOME) noted the plan did not yield balance in the composition of Over-the-Rhine's population, nor did it produce any significant commercial and industrial development in the area. HOME argued Over-the-Rhine was on path to become a "permanent low income, one-race ghetto—a stagnant, decaying 'reservation' for the poor at the doorstep to downtown." Furthermore, HOME strongly challenged Gray's assertion that the poor had all chosen their lifestyle, arguing that some wanted to move up the socioeconomic ladder. In 1993 Over-the-Rhine's housing policy was changed after several small-business owners filed a lawsuit, calling the policy "racial and economic segregation." The city settled out of court and agreed to set aside money for non-subsidized housing.

=== Urban Land Institute Study ===
In 1996, the city invited the Urban Land Institute (ULI) to study Over-the-Rhine and create a plan for revitalization. ULI recommended the creation of a bi-partisan "Over-the-Rhine Coalition" to reach compromise between the polarized, deadlocked neighborhood factions. Gray refused to participate in the coalition unless specific demands were met, believing the city-funded ULI study was meant to derail his efforts to preserve low-income housing in the neighborhood. ULI panelists questioned whether Gray had too much power over City Hall, and asked the city to question whether they should continue to fund Gray—whom they considered "an impediment to revitalization." Later that year, near a critical point in negotiations, Buddy Gray was shot to death by a mentally-ill homeless man whom he had helped. After Gray's murder his allies were not able to recreate his leadership, and the Over-the-Rhine Coalition was formed.

== Death ==
On November 15, 1996, Wilbur Worthen, a mentally-ill homeless man, whom Buddy Gray had helped, shot Gray to death in his office at the Drop Inn Center. The man claimed Gray had been pumping poisonous gas into his apartment. Rumors spread among Gray's supporters that he was assassinated, but police were unable to find a connection between the shooter and a recent anti-Gray pamphlet and phone campaign. Worthen was found mentally incompetent to stand trial and sentenced to a psychiatric facility.

== Legacy ==
Gray's legacy lived on through the Drop Inn Center and ReSTOC, his low-income housing cooperative. ReSTOC was one of the neighborhood's largest property owners, and at one point owned 71 parcels in Over-the-Rhine. However, the non-profit had trouble keeping up with the cost and work needed to maintain all of their properties. According to former mayor Charlie Luken in 2001, ReSTOC "are the owners of the most blight in Over-the-Rhine. Period." Critics of ReSTOC accused the nonprofit of stockpiling properties in order to prevent redevelopment. The Cincinnati Enquirer reported that despite receiving millions of dollars from federal, state, and local governments to develop low-income housing ReSTOC "actually reduced the number of occupied apartments." In 2002 the city forced ReSTOC to sell some of its properties and use funds from those sales to maintain and improve the other properties it owned. ReSTOC later merged with another nonprofit, Over-the-Rhine Housing Network, to form Over-the-Rhine Community Housing.
