= Wielert's =

Coordinates: 39°06′41″N 84°30′55″W

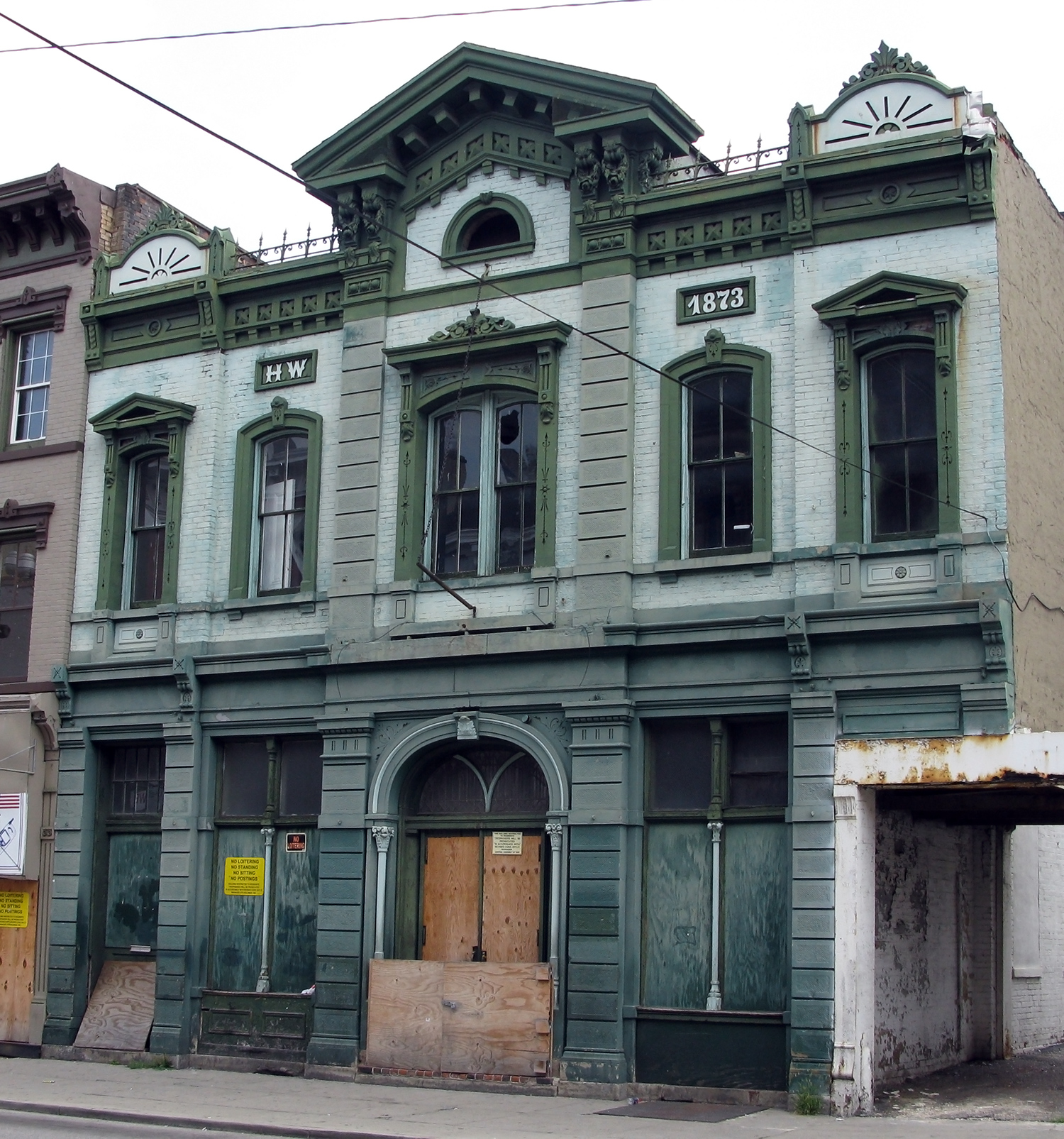
Wielert's is at 1410 Vine Street, albeit abandoned as of 2009.

Wielert's, built in 1873, was once a famous beer garden in the Over-the-Rhine neighborhood of Cincinnati, Ohio. OTR Predevelopment, a subsidiary of 3cdc bought this property along with others on Vine St. on July 30, 2010. (Hamilton County Auditor)

In March 2022, a new restaurant named Alcove, run by the operators of MadTree Brewing, opened in the former Wielert's building.
