= Shelterhouse =

Homeless shelter in Cincinnati, Ohio, US

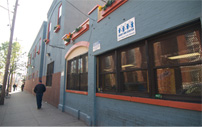
Former Drop Inn Center shelter

The Shelterhouse, formerly Drop Inn Center, is a homeless shelter in Cincinnati, Ohio. The name was a reference to "drop-in center". The Shelterhouse is the largest homeless shelter in Cincinnati.

== History ==
The Shelterhouse began in the early 1970s. The shelter's founder, Buddy Gray, took people off the street into his own apartment. The shelter formalized and began as an evening shelter for the homeless in Cincinnati in 1973. It occupied a series of storefronts in Over-the-Rhine, first at 1713 Vine St. and later at 1324 Main Street. In 1976, city politics and a lack of funding threatened the shelter with closure on the weekends. A group of volunteers responded to this by committing to keep the shelter open seven days a week; they soon incorporated as an organization called the Shelterhouse Volunteer Group.

Through the 1990s, the Drop Inn Center continued to add space and programs for the homeless. The women's side of shelter was completely renovated in 1994, and in 1998 a recovery program for women, the Full Circle Program, began. In 1996, when Recovery Hotel opened as a transitional housing facility for men in recovery the Drop Inn Center began providing supportive services there. This direction was furthered by the development of the 12th & Elm Transitional Housing Project, eventually relocated in 2008 to make room for a new public arts high school.

A new comprehensive intake system began in 2004 which allowed the Drop Inn Center to track its residents more effectively. The Drop Inn Center added a Case Management Program targeted to the long term homeless as well as a housing subsidy program called Shelter Plus Care. The shelter now operates on a housing-first model, implementing Rapid Re-housing services and case management. In 2009 the Center reorganized to add improvements to the Emergency Shelter, including the creation of a Step-Up Dorm for Men.

In 2010, the Cincinnati/Hamilton County Continuum of Care for the Homeless, which distributes state and federal money for the region, announced that they were moving funding from the Drop Inn Center's women's shelter to the YWCA of Cincinnati, although there was no immediate impact on the 42 beds for women at the Drop Inn Center. The move was criticized as being costly. The executive director at the time Pat Clifford was fired by the board of directors in August 2010. The reason for his termination was not provided by the board of directors.

In 2015, the Drop Inn Center rebranded to become Shelterhouse often stylized as Shelterhouse, formerly Drop Inn Center. Two new shelters were opened: The Esther Marie Hatton Center for Women located at 2499 Reading Road in Mt. Auburn and The David and Rebecca Barron Center for Men located at 411 Gest Street in Queensgate.
