= List of police stations =

This is an incomplete list of police stations, world-wide, that are individually notable. This includes current and former police stations that have been recognized and documented by historic registries, as well as other historic or modern ones that have been the locations of major events or otherwise received substantial coverage.

== India ==
- Ramgopalpet Police Station, in Secunderabad

== United Kingdom ==
- List of police stations in the West Midlands

== United States ==
- 7th District Police Station
- 48th Police Precinct Station
- 52nd Police Precinct Station House and Stable
- 75th Police Precinct Station House
- 83rd Precinct Police Station and Stable
- Coral Gables Police and Fire Station
- District 13 Police Station
- Eighth Precinct Police Station
- Former 18th Police Precinct Station House and Stable
- Fullerton City Hall
- Glendale Police Station
- Highland Park Police Station
- Kansas City Police Station Number 4
- Northern District Police Station
- Old Pine Street Station
- Old Police Headquarters
- Police Station No. 2 (Cincinnati, Ohio)
- Police Station No. 3 (Cincinnati, Ohio)
- Police Station No. 6 (Cincinnati, Ohio)
- Police Station No. 7 (Cincinnati, Ohio)
- Portland Police Block
- Southern District Police Station
- Third Precinct Police Station
- Waldo Street Police Station
- Whittenton Fire and Police Station

Ones without NRHP category:

- 42nd Precinct / Town Hall Police Station
- 1200 Travis
- Cedarville Opera House
- H. F. Barrows Manufacturing Company Building
- Kansas City Police Station Number 4
- Peter Pierce Store
- Police Station No. 5 (Cincinnati, Ohio)
- Quincy Police Station

== See also ==
- List of fire stations
