= Cincinnati in the American Civil War =

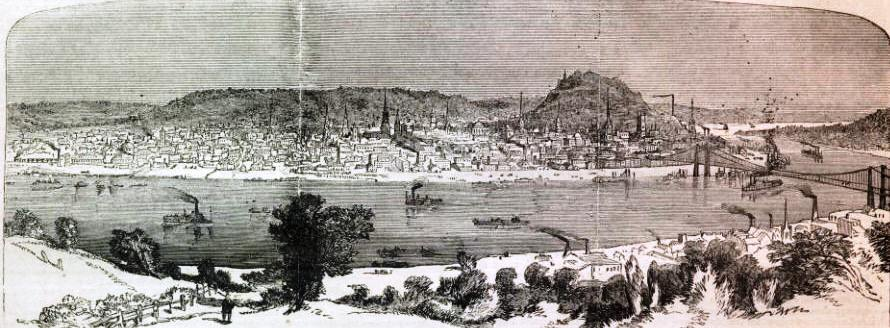
Cincinnati in 1862, a lithograph in Harper's Weekly

During the American Civil War, the Ohio River port city of Cincinnati, Ohio, played a key role as a major source of supplies and troops for the Union Army. It also served as the headquarters for much of the war for the Department of the Ohio, which was charged with the defense of the region, as well as directing the army's offensives into Kentucky and Tennessee.

== Cincinnati at the outset of the Civil War ==
Antebellum Cincinnati played a large role in the abolitionist movement, partially due to its location as a major city in the free state of Ohio directly across the river from the slave state Kentucky. The "Queen City" became a major migration path for escaped slaves. Leading abolitionists such as Lyman Beecher, James Birney, Salmon P. Chase, Levi Coffin, and Theodore Weld frequently spoke or wrote in support of freeing the slaves. They often encountered local resistance, including violent actions from those with opposing viewpoints. Several locations in the region were alleged to be stops on the Underground Railroad. Debates held at the Lane Theological Seminary fueled the anti-slavery controversy.

Cincinnati had mixed political views. Many of the city's swelling immigrant population, including Germans, embraced the fledgling Republican Party. In 1859, Abraham Lincoln made his first political visit to Cincinnati, where he challenged presidential hopeful Stephen Douglas's views on slavery. The political editor of the Cincinnati Daily Gazette later wrote the positive biography, The Life of Abraham Lincoln, which was used as campaign propaganda during Abraham Lincoln's 1860 presidential campaign. The Cincinnati Daily Times, a Democratic newspaper, openly supported the South's right to secede.

At the outset of the war in early 1861, hundreds of Cincinnati's young men flocked to military service. Among the more prominent regiments raised in Cincinnati was the 9th Ohio Infantry, the first almost all-German unit to enter the Union Army. The city gave $250,000.00 for the organization of this unit. In May 1861, the United States Sanitary Commission recruited associate members in Cincinnati, who began supplementing the government in providing comfort for the soldiers. Through their efforts, the Good Samaritan Hospital was completed as a medical facility for injured or wounded soldiers. A year later, they established a Soldiers' Home.

The city became noted as a major source of gunboats and other Union Navy vessels from the burgeoning shipyards in the east side Fulton neighborhood along the Ohio River. Boilers, armor plating, and cast iron cannons were also manufactured in Cincinnati. The city also was a major distribution point for grain, pork, beef, other food, and military supplies to the Union armies serving in the Western Theater.

== Camp Dennison ==
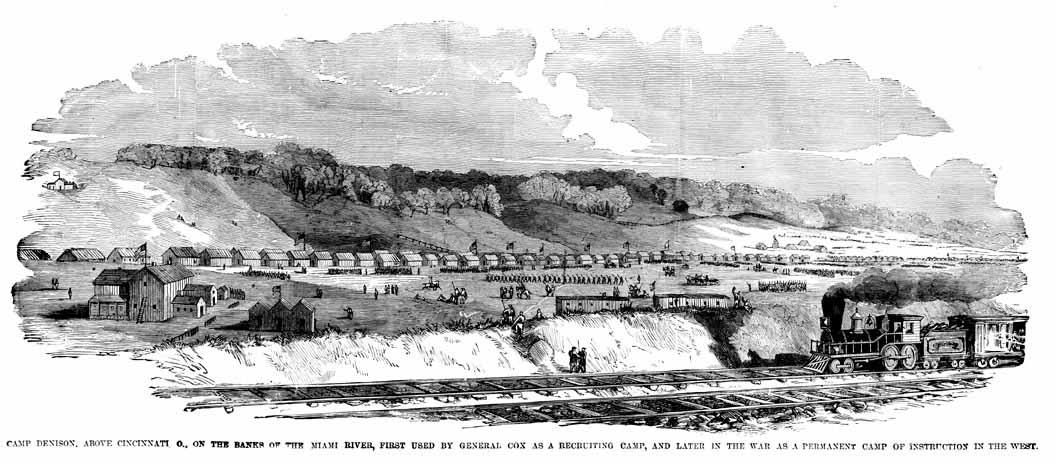
Camp Dennison

With the outbreak of the Civil War, George B. McClellan, a prominent Cincinnati resident and the commander of Ohio's state militia, was charged with selecting a site for a recruitment and training center for southern Ohio. The Cincinnati region was a possible target for the Confederate Army due to its Ohio River location and proximity to slave states such as Kentucky and Virginia, from which invasions could be launched. He chose a level tract of land near Indian Hill, Ohio, 17 miles from Cincinnati. More than 50,000 Union soldiers were mustered in or out of service at Camp Dennison. As many as 12,000 occupied the camp at any one time. Among the post's commanders was Cincinnati horticulturalist and former Ohio Militia general Melancthon Wade.

Shortly after the Battle of Shiloh in April 1862, a military hospital was established on the grounds of Camp Dennison, with over 200 beds situated in a series of wooden barracks. The nearby Waldschmidt Cemetery served as the temporary gravesite for Union soldiers and Confederate prisoners of war. As the war progressed, Camp Dennison became a significant base of operations for Federal military units heading south to the front lines.

Another significant U.S. Army training camp near Cincinnati was Camp Harrison, located six miles north of Cincinnati, on the Cincinnati, Hamilton and Dayton Railroad. The post was named for President William Henry Harrison, who was from Hamilton County. The soldiers at Camp Harrison usually remained at the camp for only a short time for training.

== 1862 invasion threat ==
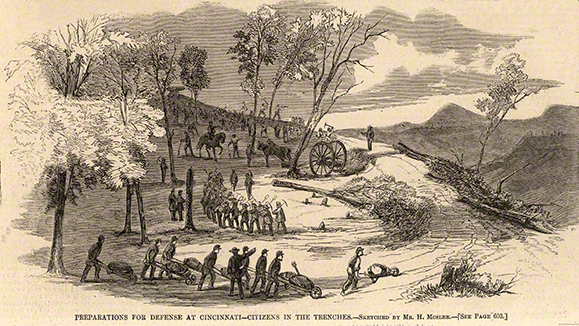
Henry Mosler, Preparations for Defense at Cincinnati, sketch, Harper’s Weekly, September 20, 1862

In September 1862, Confederate Brig. Gen. Henry Heth was sent north from Lexington, Kentucky to "make a demonstration" in front of Cincinnati, then the sixth largest city in the United States, according to Heth's memoirs. Mayor George Hatch declared martial law, and Union Maj. Gen. Lew Wallace organized the citizens for defense and raised the Black Brigade of Cincinnati. Along eight miles of hilltops from Ludlow to present-day Fort Thomas, Kentucky, volunteers and soldiers constructed rifle pits and other defensive works, which were defended by 22,000 Union soldiers and 50,000 local militia volunteers, called "Squirrel Hunters." On September 5, Governor Tod announced to the public that no more volunteers would be needed for the defense of Cincinnati, but he advised that all military organizations be kept up for future needs.

Cincinnati was briefly threatened by the Confederate cavalry of Brig. Gen. Albert G. Jenkins, who bypassed Cincinnati to the east and entered Ohio near Buffington Island. General Heth and his men marched up the Lexington Road in Northern Kentucky towards the Ohio River. He soon encountered the strong line of Federal defenses and wisely decided not to attack. He lingered in the region for one day and then retreated on September 13. Union General Wallace soon earned the nickname "Savior of Cincinnati" for his energetic defensive actions. The Squirrel Hunters returned to their homes.

By war's end, Cincinnati was defended by 27 earthwork forts and batteries. Six of these artillery positions remain; Hooper Battery and Shaler Battery are open to the public.

== Later war years ==
Maj. Gen. Ambrose Burnside, the new commander of the Department of the Ohio as of March 1863, established his headquarters in Cincinnati and garrisoned the area with veteran units from his newly created XXIII Corps. During Morgan's Raid in July, troops from Camp Dennison, at Burnside's orders, responded to the invasion by Confederate cavalry under Brig. Gen. John Hunt Morgan. Gunboats dispatched from Cincinnati played a large role in contributing to Morgan's defeat at the Battle of Buffington Island.

In December 1863, the United States Sanitary Commission opened the "Cincinnati Sanitary Fair" at the opera house as a way of focusing attention on local relief efforts for the soldiers. Bazaars, food stands, art galleries, lectures, and concerts were among the attractions. The Fair ran until April 1864 and garnered $234,000 in revenues and donations, $175,000 collected from Cincinnatians themselves.

Cincinnati became the scene of numerous military courts-martial and trials of civilians accused of treason or aiding the Confederate cause. Among those convicted in these tribunals was Ohio Copperhead Clement Vallandigham.

During the 1864 Presidential Election, Cincinnatians voted heavily for President Lincoln over General McClellan, whose strong personal Cincinnati ties were not enough to carry Hamilton County.

With the cessation of hostilities in 1865, Cincinnati became a major place for Federal troops to disembark from river steamers and reenter Northern soil. A network of roads and railroads carried soldiers back to Camp Dennison or to their home cities to be mustered out of the service.

== Prominent Cincinnatians in the war effort ==
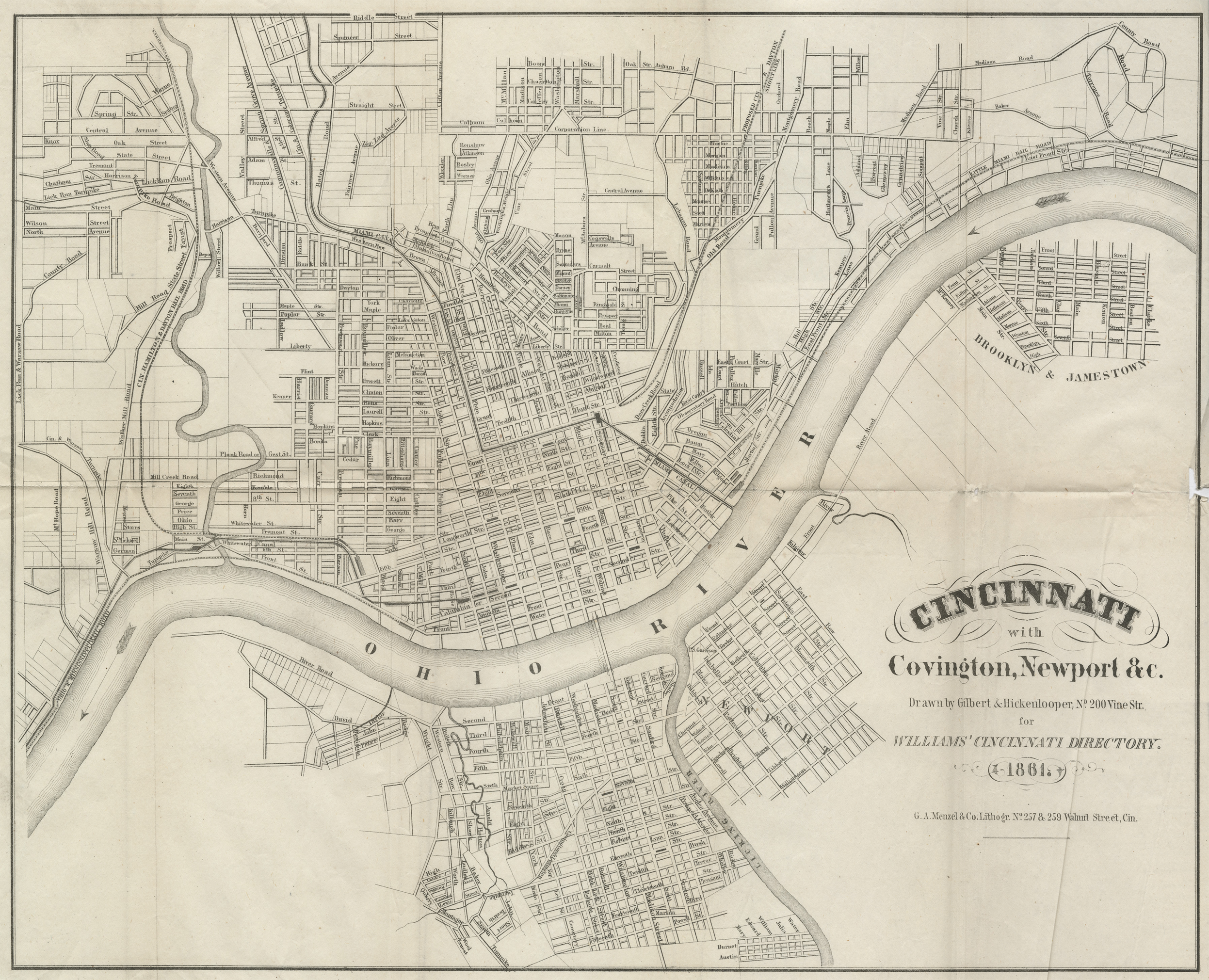
Map of Cincinnati in 1861

- Nicholas Longworth Anderson
- Powhatan Beaty
- William Dennison
- William M. Dickson
- William Dwight
- James A. Greer
- George Hatch
- Andrew Hickenlooper
- William Haines Lytle
- Ormsby M. Mitchel
- Dr. John Moore
- Edward F. Noyes
- John P. Slough
- Thomas R. Hawkins
- Godfrey Weitzel
- August Willich
- Philander P. Lane

Note that Ulysses S. Grant was born in Point Pleasant, about 25 miles (40 km) east of Cincinnati. He maintained Cincinnati ties. For much of the Civil War, his favorite mount was a large horse named "Cincinnati".

See "Philander P. Lane; Colonel of Volunteers in the Civil War, Eleventh Ohio Regiment; by William Forse Scott, 1920

== Civil War memorialization and tourism ==
- The National Steamboat Monument on Mehring Way (near its intersection with Broadway) in Cincinnati commemorates the hundreds of Ohio soldiers who were liberated from Southern prison camps but perished in the Sultana tragedy. An Ohio Historical Society marker at Sawyer Point also recounts the Sultana tragedy, as an estimated fifty Cincinnatians died in the disaster. The ill-fated ship had been constructed in 1862 by the John Lithoberry Shipyard on Front Street in Cincinnati.
- Other markers and monuments are scattered throughout the town. Cincinnati has busts for Robert L. McCook and Friedrich Hecker and statues of Civil War-era composer Stephen Foster and Union general / President James A. Garfield. There are two statues of President Lincoln.
- The Cincinnati Civil War Memorial Hall was erected in 1908.
- Cincinnati's sprawling and well-landscaped Spring Grove Cemetery is the final resting place for 40 former Civil War generals. A prominent member of Lincoln's cabinet, Salmon P. Chase, who became Chief Justice of the US Supreme Court, was also interred in the cemetery. Sculptor Randolph Rogers' statue of a Union infantryman on guard, "The Sentinel", was installed in Spring Grove Cemetery in 1865; it was one of the state's first formal Civil War monuments.
- The city's importance as a stop along the Underground Railroad is memorialized at the National Underground Railroad Freedom Center on the Ohio River. The placement of the museum on the riverfront is symbolic. Crossing the river from Kentucky to Ohio meant the fugitives were escaping slavery and entering free territory.
- A number of Civil War reenactor encampments are held each year in the greater Cincinnati area, including "Civil War Days" the first weekend of May in Sharon Woods Park.

== See also ==
- Ohio in the American Civil War
