= Ramage =

Ramage may refer to:

== People ==
- Adam Ramage (1772-1850), printing press manufacturer
- Alan Ramage (born 1957), English cricketer
- Alison Ramage, British mathematician
- Andy Ramage (born 1974), English footballer
- Cecil Ramage (1895–1988), Scottish barrister, actor and Liberal politician
- Craig Ramage (born 1970), English footballer
- David Ramage (born 1939), Australian rower
- Craufurd Tait Ramage (1803–1878), Scottish travel writer and anthologist
- Edward V. Ramage (1908–1981), US Presbyterian Church minister
- Fiona Ramage (born 1978), New Zealand cyclist
- George Ramage (born 1937), Scottish footballer
- Graeme Ramage (born 1992), Scottish footballer
- Granville Ramage (1919—2011), British ambassador to Gambia and Yemen
- Henry Ramage (1827–1859), Scottish dragoon and Victoria Cross recipient
- Ian Ramage (born 1958), Scottish cricket umpire
- James A. Ramage, American academic and museum namesake
- James D. Ramage (1916–2012), US Navy Rear Admiral
- John Ramage (artist) (1748–1802), Irish-American painter
- John Ramage (ice hockey) (born 1991), Canadian-American ice hockey player
- Lawson P. Ramage (1909–1990), Vice Admiral and noted submarine commander during World War II
- Pat Ramage (1922–2003), Canadian skiing executive
- Paul Ramage (born 1940), English cricketer and headmaster
- Peter Ramage (1908–1982), Scottish footballer
- Peter Ramage (born 1983), English footballer
- Rob Ramage (born 1959), Canadian ice hockey player
- Richard Ramage (1896–1971), British colonial administrator.
- Robert Ramage (jockey) (1865–1925), Australian jockey
- Robert Ramage (chemist) (1935−2019), Scottish chemist

== Places ==
- Ramage Point, an ice-covered point on Carney Island, Antarctica
- Ramage, West Virginia, an unincorporated community in West Virginia, United States
- Ramage Square, a residential square in Leith, Edinburgh, Scotland

== Other uses ==
- James A. Ramage Civil War Museum, museum in Northern Kentucky
- Nicholas Ramage, a character in Dudley Pope's Ramage series of historical novels
- Ramage (novel), the first novel in the Ramage series
- Ramage & Ferguson, Scottish shipbuilding company
- USS Ramage, a guided missile destroyer in the United States Navy
