= Police Station No. 5 (Cincinnati) =

- U.S. National Register of Historic Places
- U.S. Historic district – Contributing property
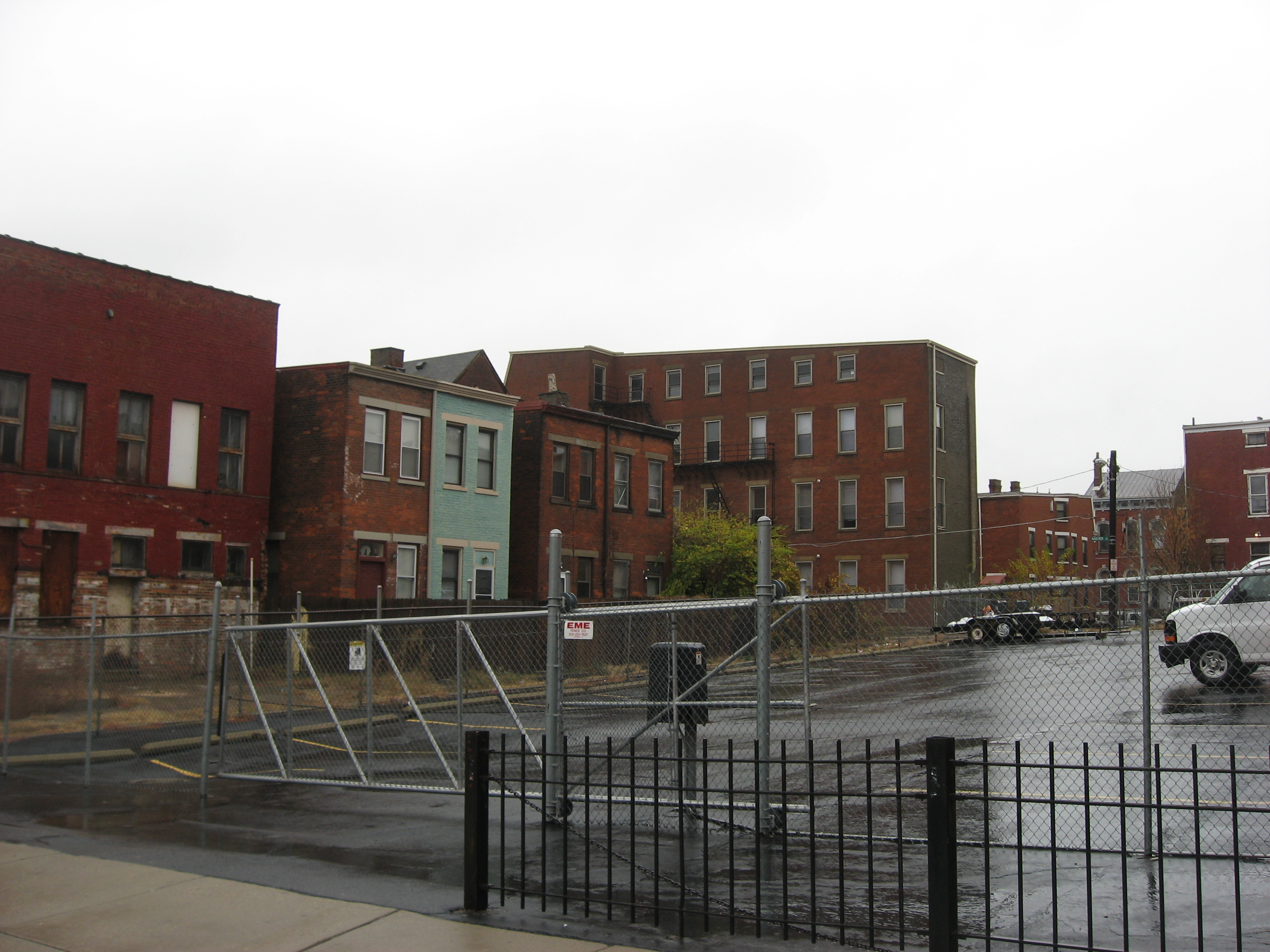
- Site of the police station

- Location within Ohio Location within the United States
- Location: 1024-1026 York St., Cincinnati, Ohio
- Coordinates: 39°7′4″N 84°31′57″W
- Area: Less than 1 acre (0.40 ha)
- Built: 1896
- Architect: Samuel Hannaford and Sons
- Architectural style: Romanesque
- Part of: Dayton Street Historic District (ID73001457)
- MPS: Samuel Hannaford and Sons TR in Hamilton County
- NRHP reference No.: 80003075
- Added to NRHP: March 3, 1980

Police Station Five was a historic police station in the West End neighborhood of Cincinnati, Ohio. Constructed in the 1890s to serve both regular police and the city's patrol service, it was named a historic site in the late twentieth century, but historic designation was unable to save it from destruction.

== History ==
Other than Chicago, which formed a patrol service in 1877, Cincinnati was the first city in the United States to establish a horse-mounted patrol service to provide general emergency services. When the first patrol force was formed at the end of 1881, its officers rode in horse-drawn carts that carried medical equipment such as surgical tools and stretchers in addition to police paraphernalia. Besides their responsibilities of supporting the regular police force, patrol officers watched for fires, and horse-mounted patrols provided police service in sparsely populated parts of the city in which foot patrols were inconvenient. Their services were essential during emergencies, such as the chaos of early 1884: patrol officers rescued those endangered by dangerous Ohio River flooding and sought to maintain order during the courthouse riots. Horse-powered patrols were replaced by patrol cars and motorcycles in the 1910s and 1920s.

Originally an English immigrant working lowly jobs for established architects, Hannaford raised himself into public prominence by producing such grand buildings as Music Hall, and the built environments of Cincinnati's wealthier neighborhoods were filled with Hannaford-designed buildings by the end of the nineteenth century. At the age of 62, Hannaford retired in 1897, one year after the construction of Police Station Five. The station was originally a base for horse-mounted patrols; they had previously been based at the former City Stables, and the construction of the new building was mandated by the Stables' poor structural condition. It was also constructed with space for the police. During the twentieth century, the station saw a conversion from simple patrol usage into being the precinct headquarters for the city's fifth police district. It remained in official use until 1957, when a replacement police station opened on Ludlow Avenue, but it remained in city ownership. A contracting firm bought the building from the city in late 1980. City officials hoped to see its preservation and redevelopment, but the new owners sold it in 1984 to another company that demolished the building and replaced it with a parking lot.

== Architecture ==
Built of brick with elements of sandstone, Police Station Five rested on a stone foundation. The Romanesque Revival style dominated, although Queen Anne was also present. Components such as brick corbeling and ashlar stonework laid in belt courses contributed to the appearance of its symmetrical design. Despite stylistic differences, Police Station Five closely resembles Police Stations Two and Three, neoclassical structures downtown and on the city's west side: all three were built with similar massing and with symmetrical two-story structures, and covered with flat roofs. Contributing to the design similarities were practical necessities: when built, all three housed both police and patrol, and the form of Police Station Five was dictated by its placement in a neighborhood of rowhouses with deep lots of narrow width; its horse-mounted patrol could only access their section of the building via side and rear doors facing alleyways.

== Historic site ==
In early 1973, 67 acres (27 ha) of land in Cincinnati's West End was designated the Dayton Street Historic District and listed on the National Register of Historic Places. Comprising approximately four hundred contributing properties, the historic district encompassed four blocks of York Street, including Police Station Five. The station was individually added to the Register in 1980 as part of a multiple property submission of Hannaford-designed buildings, and one year later it was included in another multiple property submission of Cincinnati patrol stations. Even though no police station has occupied the lot at 1024-1026 York Street since the 1980s, the property remains on the National Register.
