= Senator Key (disambiguation) =

David M. Key (1824–1900) was a U.S. Senator from Tennessee. Senator Key may also refer to:

- Johnny Key (politician) (born 1968), Arkansas State Senate
- Thomas Marshall Key (1819–1869), Ohio State Senate

== See also ==
- Senator Keyes (disambiguation)
