= Wallace Guards =

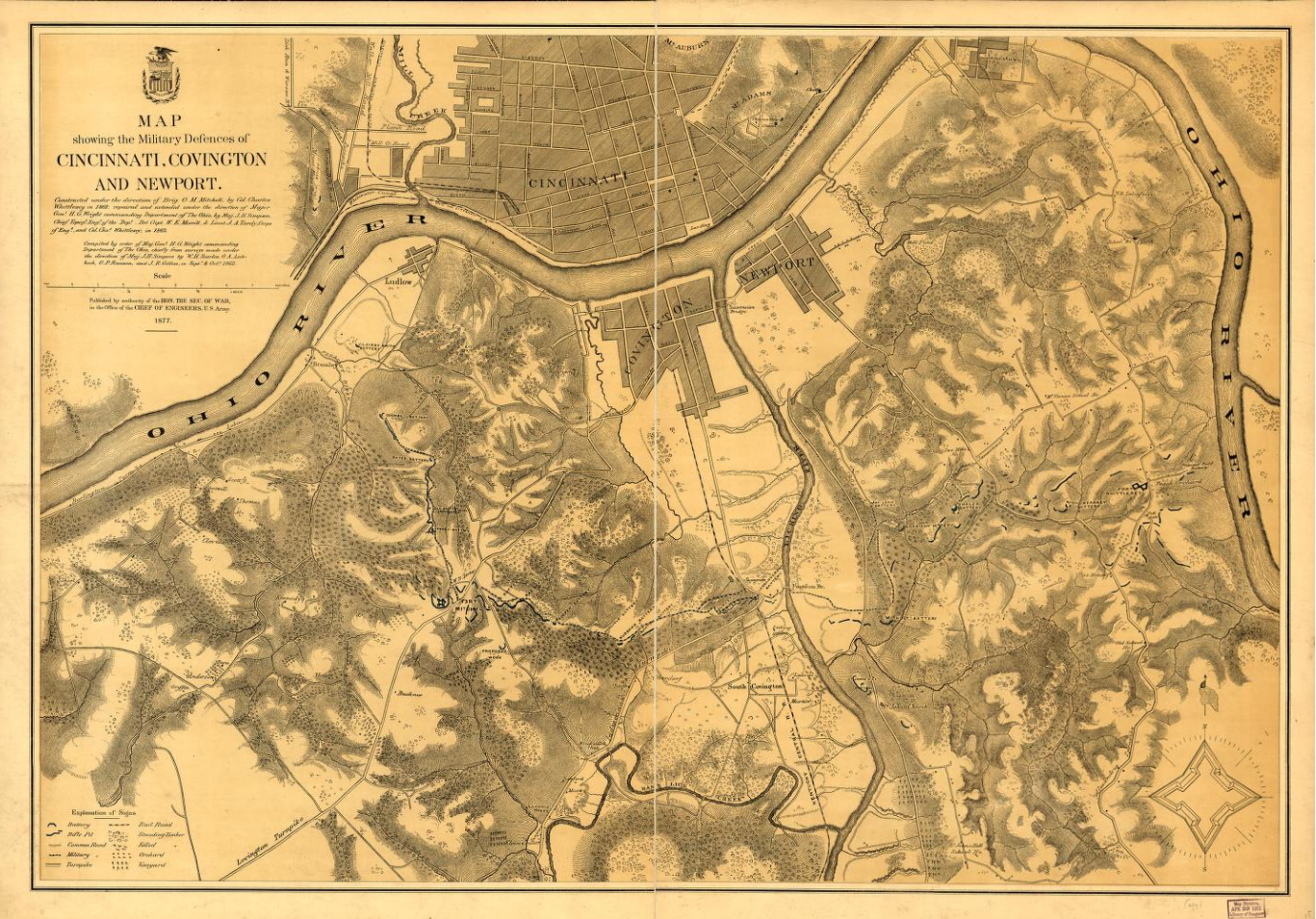
- Map of the defenses of Cincinnati and Covington, 1862
- Active: September 2 – October 4, 1862
- Allegiance: United States of America
- Branch: Ohio Volunteer Militia; Union Army
- Size: Company (80+)
- Engagements: American Civil War: Kentucky Campaign; Defense of Cincinnati

Commanders
- Notable commanders: Capt. Charles Worthington

The Wallace Guards were an independent company of Ohio militia raised when Cincinnati was under attack from Confederates in September 1862. The hastily formed company served for one month, and were part of the Defense of Cincinnati.

== Background ==
In August 1862, Confederate forces under the command of Generals Braxton Bragg and Edmund Kirby Smith invaded Kentucky in an attempt to force the neutral state into joining the Confederacy. The Confederate strategy called for Bragg to attack Louisville, Kentucky, while Smith would attack Cincinnati.

On September 2, 1862, General Lew Wallace, the commanding officer of United States soldiers in Cincinnati, issued an order that required the councilmen of the city to organize militia companies in each city ward. Three regiments were quickly raised, comprising thirty companies of infantry, one company of cavalry and one battery of artillery.

Additional, short-term, independent companies were raised for service under General Wallace, including the Wallace Guards, which were named in honour of the general.

== Formation ==
The Wallace Guards were formed and enrolled in Cincinnati on September 2, 1862. On September 9, the company was mustered into federal service in Covington, Kentucky by Lt. Ware of the Regular Army.

The company was commanded by Captain Charles Worthington, 1st Lieutenant Samuel K. Williams, and 2nd Lieutenant H.M. Diggins.

== Service ==
From September 9 until October 3, the Wallace Guards served duty in the Cincinnati defences that were established on the Kentucky side of the Ohio River near Covington. No attack was made directly against Cincinnati by the Confederates and thus the Wallace Guards never saw actual combat, serving duty in the defenses for the rest of September.

By October, the immediate threat of invasion was over and there was no longer any need for so many independent militia companies. The Wallace Guards were mustered out of federal service on October 4, 1862, at Cincinnati by Captain P.H. Breslin of the 18th U.S. Infantry.

== See also ==
- List of Ohio Civil War units
