= Dayton Street Historic District =

Historic district in Ohio, United States

- U.S. National Register of Historic Places
- U.S. Historic district
- Cincinnati Local Historic Landmark
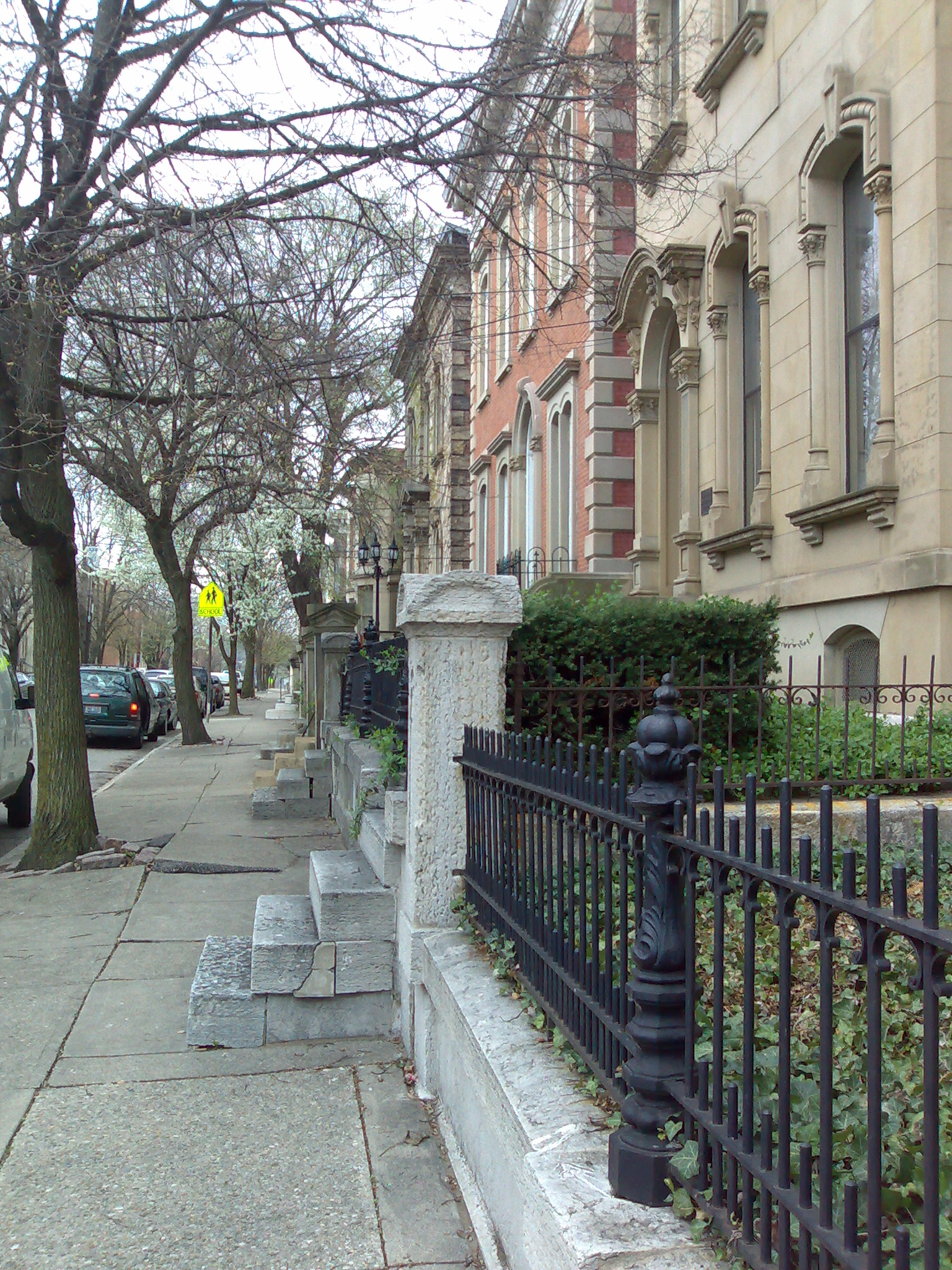

- Location within Ohio Location within the United States
- Location: Roughly bounded by Bank, Linn, and Poplar Sts. and Winchell Ave., Cincinnati, Ohio
- Coordinates: 39°7′3″N 84°31′50″W
- Built: circa 1860
- Architect: Skaats, George W.
- Architectural style: Italianate
- NRHP reference No.: 73001457
- Added to NRHP: January 25, 1973

The Dayton Street Historic District is located in the Old West End neighborhood of Cincinnati, Ohio, United States. It was once known as "Millionaires' Row" for the prominent industrialists who resided in a row of opulent mansions built between 1850 and 1890. It is bounded by Bank Street, Poplar Street, Linn Street, and Winchell Avenue. The district was designated and listed on the National Register of Historic Places on January 25, 1973.

Due to its location well north of Cincinnati when the city was founded, the district occupies land that was originally used by small farmers, both for crop fields and for livestock pasture; some of the massive stockyards in the city once known as "Porkopolis" were located nearby, although even farther from the original city. As the city grew, wealthy residents built country houses within the district's boundaries, beginning c. 1840 and continuing until the Civil War era. Significant development began c. 1860 and continued for the next two decades. Typical buildings erected during this time are multi-story Italianate residences constructed of brick or stone, similar to townhouses but detached. At the neighborhood's height, the residents were wealthy businessmen, most of whom were active in the city's meatpacking and brewing industries, and many of these men were careful to beautify their homes with elements such as stone retaining walls and fences of cast iron; while much of the stonework and ironwork has been lost, large amounts of both remain. The entire historic district embraces approximately four hundred contributing properties, almost all single-family houses, although there are occasional exceptions; the former Police Station No. 5 on York Street was included. The Hauck House which houses Cincinnati Preservation is located at 812 Dayton Street and the Mayor George Hatch House is located at 830 Dayton Street.
