= Defense of Cincinnati =

Part of the American Civil War

- Part of the American Civil War
- A modern mural depicting the "Squirrel Hunters" crossing the Ohio River for the defense of Cincinnati.
Date	September 1–13, 1862
Location	Kenton County & Campbell County, Kentucky, & Cincinnati, Ohio
Result	Union strategic victory

Belligerents
United States (Union)	(Confederate States of America) CSA (Confederacy)

Commanders and leaders
Lew Wallace	Henry Heth

Strength
85,000 [approximate 25,000 military & 60,000 militia]	8,000 [approximate]

Casualties and losses
6 total 1 killed 5 wounded	Unknown

The Defense of Cincinnati occurred during what is now referred to as the Confederate Heartland Offensive or Kentucky Campaign of the American Civil War, from September 1 through September 13, 1862. Confederate Brigadier General Henry Heth was sent north from Lexington, Kentucky, to threaten Cincinnati, Ohio, then the sixth-largest city in the United States. Heth was under orders from his superior, Major General Edmund Kirby Smith, not to attack the city, but to instead make a "demonstration". Once Heth arrived and reconnoitered the defenses, he realized an attack was pointless. After a few minor skirmishes, he took his men back to Lexington.

== Union preparations ==
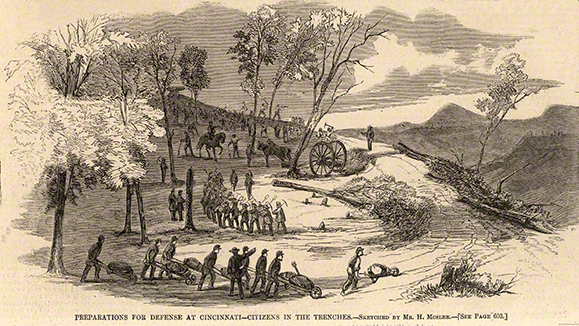
Henry Mosler, Preparations for Defense at Cincinnati, sketch, Harper’s Weekly, September 20, 1862

Cincinnati's mayor, George Hatch, ordered all businesses closed. Union Major General Lew Wallace declared martial law, seized sixteen steamboats and had them armed, and organized the citizens of Cincinnati, Covington, and Newport, Kentucky for defense.

Among the groups organized were the Black Brigade of Cincinnati, a forcibly conscripted group of free African Americans. The Black Brigade was given its own flag and each man was paid $13 for one month's service, the same pay given to privates at that time. Seven hundred and six members of the Black Brigade built fortifications in Kentucky to protect Cincinnati. They had no weapons and only had a few cavalry scouts between them and Confederate troops. The brigade worked until September 20, when there was no longer a threat to Cincinnati. When they were done, hundreds of acres of forests had been cleared and in some locations used as abatis obstructions. Miles of rifle pits were dug. They built forts, magazines, and miles of military roads and breastworks along the border with Northern Kentucky between Fort Thomas and Bromley. The fortifications were built far enough away from Cincinnati that the Confederates could not shell the city.

The fortifications were defended by 25,000 Union Army soldiers and 45,000 local militia volunteers (including the Wallace Guards). Further support was provided by more than 15,000 so-called "Squirrel Hunters"—untrained volunteers from other parts of Ohio who carried outdated equipment. Construction of the defenses was directed by Colonel Charles Whittlesey until relieved by Major James H. Simpson, chief of Topographical Engineers for the Department of the Ohio. On September 5, Ohio governor David Tod announced to the public that no additional volunteers would be needed for the defense of Cincinnati, but he advised that all military organizations be kept up for future needs.

== Heth's arrival, skirmishing and departure ==
Heth and his men marched from Lexington, Kentucky, on the Lexington Turnpike (present-day U.S. Route 25), arriving south of Covington on September 6. After reconnoitering the defenses at various points, he determined that an attack was pointless. Heth's forces stayed only a few days, skirmishing with members of the 101st Ohio Infantry, 103rd Ohio Infantry and 104th Ohio Infantry near Fort Mitchel on September 10–11 and returning south to Lexington on September 12, 1862.

On September 12, Wallace telegraphed Major General Horatio Wright (commander of the Department of the Ohio) in Cincinnati: "The skedaddle is complete; every sign of a rout. If you say so I will organize a column of 20,000 men to pursue to-night." The large pursuit was never ordered as most of the military forces were sent via steamboats to Louisville, Kentucky to prevent capture by General Braxton Bragg. However, small scouting forces were sent southward to harass the rear-guard of Heth's forces. A skirmish occurred at Florence, Kentucky, on September 17. Another skirmish occurred near Walton, Kentucky on September 25, when Colonel Basil W. Duke attacked a Union camp of approximately 500 men near Snow's Pond.

For his vigorous defense of the city, Wallace earned the nickname "Savior of Cincinnati". Within a month of the panic, the Squirrel Hunters returned to their homes.

== The defenses ==
In September 1862, one earthwork fort and five earthwork batteries were extant in Kenton County and only three earthwork batteries in Campbell County, all having been constructed in 1861. Two earthwork batteries protecting the city's flanks were located on hills at the west and east sides of Cincinnati. Altogether, the defenses were armed with just 15 heavy guns.

When Wallace moved his headquarters from Cincinnati to Kentucky, he selected the main building at the Thompson Winery that was designated Fort Henry, although no earthworks were ever constructed on the site. It was the approximate center of the line of fortifications and telegraph lines connected each of the earthwork positions with his headquarters.

Following the threat, many more batteries and forts were constructed through November 1864, mostly under the direction of Major James H. Simpson.

=== Kentucky batteries ===
Unless otherwise noted, all traces of these earthworks are gone.

==== Kenton County ====
- J. L. Kirby Smith Battery - Located in the southwest area of modern Ludlow. It was named for Colonel Joseph L. Kirby Smith, 43rd Ohio Infantry, who was mortally wounded at the Second Battle of Corinth, October 1862.
- Coombs Battery - Believed to be named for Leslie Coombs, a member of Wallace's staff. Remains of this battery are found in Covington's Devou Park.
- Bates Battery - Brigadier General Joshua Hall Bates, chairman of the Cincinnati Committee for Public Safety, was the namesake for this battery. Well-preserved, Bates Battery is located in Devou Park, but is difficult to reach.
- Perry Battery - Named for Cincinnati attorney Aaron F. Perry.
- Rich Battery - Named for Stephen Rich, landowner of the site. This position was built in 1861 and by the time of Heth's threat, it was considered out of position and unusable. It was referred to as "Old Battery" on military maps.
- Fort Mitchel - Constructed in 1861 and named for Major General Ormsby M. Mitchel, who originally directed the construction of Cincinnati's defenses in November 1861. (The city of Fort Mitchell, Kentucky, chartered in 1909, derives its name from both the fort and the general, although misspelling his name.) The fort was greatly expanded in 1863–1864. Today, only the road leading up to the fort remains.
- Kyle Battery - Located immediately northeast of Fort Mitchel on a farm owned by Robert S. Kyle. The site was destroyed by construction of Interstate 75.
- McRae Battery - Named for Captain Alexander McRae, 3rd United States Cavalry, killed in action at the Battle of Valverde, New Mexico Territory, in February 1862.
- Fort Wright - Constructed in 1863, this fortification was left uncompleted in 1864. Designed for thirteen heavy guns, Fort Wright could cover all of the ground from the front of Kyle Battery eastward to the Licking River. It was named for Major General Horatio Wright, commander of the Department of the Ohio. The city of Fort Wright, Kentucky derives its name from this fortification.
- Hooper Battery - Initially designated Kyle Battery, it was along the same ridge as McRae. The site of the battery was covered over with earth to make a level back yard for a private home that was the now-defunct James A. Ramage Civil War Museum.
- Carlisle Battery - Named for local attorney and politician John G. Carlisle.
- Burbank Battery - Named for Lieutenant Colonel Sidney Burbank, who was military commander of Cincinnati. Burbank was promoted to colonel, September 16, 1862.
- Hatch Battery - Alternately known as Brickyard Battery, it was named for Cincinnati's mayor George H. Hatch.
- Buford Battery - Constructed in 1863 and named for Kentucky half-brothers and generals Napoleon Bonaparte Buford and John Buford. This position was selected to command the ground from Fort Wright to Holt Battery in Campbell County.
- Burnet Battery - First known as Quarry Battery, it was renamed for Robert W. Burnet, commander of a local militia unit from the Cincinnati Literary Club, known as the Burnet Rifles.
- Anderson Battery - First known as Tunnel Battery, due to being located directly above a railroad tunnel (still in use), it was renamed for Larz Anderson, a Cincinnati businessman, married to Catherine Longworth, daughter of Nicholas Longworth. Larz was the brother of Brevet Major General Robert Anderson of Fort Sumter. Minor traces of this earthwork and a few rifle pits can still be seen.

==== Campbell County ====
- Wiggins Battery - This position overlooked the Licking River valley and was named for Samuel Wiggins, a Cincinnati banker and realtor. It was also known as John's Hill Battery.
- Holt Battery - Originally known as Three Mile Creek Battery and alternately as Licking Point Battery, it was named for Major General Joseph Holt, Judge Advocate General of the Army. This easily accessible earthwork is owned by Vista Pointe Apartments in Wilder, Kentucky; residential construction has destroyed much of the site north of the earthwork.
- McLean Battery - Also known as Locust Hill Battery, it was named for Major Nathaniel H. McLean, Chief of Staff for the Department of the Ohio.
- Harrison Battery - Believed to have been named for Montgomery Pike Harrison an Indiana officer killed in Texas by Indians in 1849.
- Shaler Battery - Located on property owned by Dr. Nathaniel B. Shaler, chief surgeon of the Newport Barracks, and then in use as a vineyard but adjacent to Evergreen Cemetery. Today, the cemetery encompasses the entire Shaler property. The first earthwork built on the site was leveled by U.S. Army Engineers. A larger earthwork was constructed behind the original position and remains intact. This is the most easily accessible of the remaining defensive positions.
- Groesbeck Batteries - Referred to as Batteries 1 & 2, Groesbeck, these two small positions were built in 1864 to guard the approaches to Fort Burnside. They were named for William S. Groesbeck, a Cincinnati lawyer and politician.
- Phil Kearny Battery - Originally named Beech Woods Battery, it was renamed for Major General Philip Kearny, who was killed at the battle of Chantilly, September 1, 1862.
- Fort Burnside - Constructed in 1863, this elaborate earthwork fort commanded the area from Shaler Battery to Fort Whittlesey. It was named for Major General Ambrose Burnside, commander of the Department of the Ohio, 1863–1864.
- Fort Whittlesey - Named for Colonel Charles Whittlesey, who had retired a few months before the threat to Cincinnati and was called back into service by Wallace, his former division commander.
- Battery Lee - Constructed in 1863 to overlook the Ohio River valley to the east and named for R. W. Lee, whose identity is still unknown. The earthwork was leveled for the construction of a parade ground for Fort Thomas in 1890.

=== Ohio batteries ===
- Price's Hill Battery - Located on the western edge of Cincinnati overlooking the Ohio River.
- Mount Adams Battery - Located on the eastern side of Cincinnati near Immaculata Church on Mount Adams. The present site is known as Fort View Place.
- Butcher's Hill Battery - Located near the present site of Cincinnati Playhouse in the Park in Eden Park.

== Sources ==
- Adams, Roger C. "Panic on the Ohio: The Defense of Cincinnati, Covington, and Newport, September 1862" The Journal of Kentucky Studies 9 (September 1992), pp. 80–98.
- Heth, Henry. The Memoirs of Henry Heth (Westport, CT: Greenwood Press), 1974.
- Pinney, Nelson A. History of the 104th Regiment Ohio Volunteer Infantry from 1862 to 1865 (Akron, OH: Werner and Lohmann), 1886.
- Ramage, James A. "Panic on the Ohio!: Confederates March on Cincinnati, September 1862 - II. Panic in Cincinnati" Blue & Gray Magazine Vol. 3, No. 5 (April–May 1986), pp. 11–15.
- Roth, David E. "Panic on the Ohio!: Confederates March on Cincinnati, September 1862 - III. 'Squirrel Hunters' to the Rescue" Blue & Gray Magazine Vol. 3, No. 5 (April–May 1986), pp. 16–18.
- U.S. War Department, The War of the Rebellion: A Compilation of the Official Records of the Union and Confederate Armies, Series I, Volume 16, Part II (Washington, DC: U.S. Government Printing Office), 1886. [See pages 470–511.]
- U.S. War Department, The War of the Rebellion: A Compilation of the Official Records of the Union and Confederate Armies, Series I, Volume 52, Part I (Washington, DC: U.S. Government Printing Office), 1886.
- Walden, Geoffrey R. "Panic on the Ohio!: Confederates March on Cincinnati, September 1862 - I. Introduction" Blue & Gray Magazine Vol. 3, No. 5 (April–May 1986), pp. 7–8.
- Walden, Geoffrey R. "Panic on the Ohio!: Confederates March on Cincinnati, September 1862 - IV. The Defenses of Cincinnati" Blue & Gray Magazine Vol. 3, No. 5 (April–May 1986), pp. 19–29.
