= James A. Ramage Civil War Museum =

Coordinates: 39°03′20″N 84°31′38″W

- Location within Kentucky Location within the United States
- Established: June 30, 2005; 21 years ago
- Dissolved: August 25, 2021; 5 years ago
- Location: Fort Wright, Kentucky, United States

The James A. Ramage Civil War Museum was an American Civil War museum in Fort Wright, Kentucky, United States which focused to tell the untold story of Cincinnati, Ohio, and Northern Kentucky's involvement in the Civil War. Although no battles occurred there, the people of the area resisted a push by the Confederate army in 1862. The museum was located in Fort Wright, Kentucky on the site of Hooper Battery. The museum grounds covered 17 acres (69,000 m^{2}) and it displayed historical passages, stories, and memorabilia. It also paid homage to the Black Brigade of Cincinnati, Fern Storer's kitchen, and the history of the City of Fort Wright.

On August 25, 2021, Fort Wright's mayor, Dave Hatter, ordered the museum closed, following a year of negotiations with the museum's board to correct various infrastructure and program problems. Battery Hooper Park, where the museum was located, remains open to the public.

== History ==
The City of Fort Wright was approached by the Northern Kentucky University Foundation in 2004 to acquire the property. The property had been willed to the NKU Foundation by owners Fern and Sheldon Storer and is located on top of a hill that had historical significance as one of the artillery batteries and trenches that helped defend Cincinnati, from approximately 8,000 Confederate soldiers under Maj. Gen. Henry Heth in September 1862.

Local men from all walks of life and ethnicities, plus some soldiers worked together to erect a defensive line over eight miles in length (13 km) from Ludlow to present-day Fort Thomas to defend against the Confederate invasion of Kentucky. Under the command of Major General Lew Wallace, rifle pits were dug, earthwork forts and redoubts were erected, and trees were cleared for clear fields of fire, and used as abatis barriers against infantry.

Confederate soldiers marched to within a few miles of Fort Mitchel (known today as Fort Mitchell), observed and probed the defenses for two days, and decided that the defenses which were manned by approximately 25,000 hastily gathered Union Army troops and 60,000 local militia, were too strong for an attack or siege. Following skirmishes on September 10 and 11 near Fort Mitchel, the rebel invaders withdrew to Lexington.

The property, and more specifically the two-story house that sits on it, is also significant because it was the home of Fern Storer. Storer was a well-known food editor for the now defunct Cincinnati Post from 1951 to 1976. Former Cincinnati Post home/food editor Joyce Rosencrans described Storer as "meticulous about testing recipes" and added, "She took great pride in the accuracy of those food sections and passed those principles down to me."

== The museum ==
Fern Storer died in 2002 and bequeathed her house and 14.5 acres (59,000 m^{2}) to the Northern Kentucky University Foundation. Rather than sell the lucrative hilltop site to developers, the NKU Foundation sold the property to the City of Fort Wright for $790,000. City officials, in turn, announced plans to turn the historic site into a passive park focusing on the area's Civil War heritage. The land where Hooper Battery was located is one of only six extant Civil War fortifications in Northern Kentucky. The City of Fort Wright was responsible for the Hooper Battery archaeological site including public archaeology excavations and any future restoration with a $32,000 grant from the Scripps Howard Foundation Center for Civic Engagement.

In May 2004, Fort Wright Administrator Larry Klein said this of the grant, "This will be a great start to a great park. The few batteries that do exist aren't very accessible. There will be no place else like this in Greater Cincinnati that'll be preserved and open for public use." Today, only six batteries remain - four in Kenton County and two in Campbell County. The museum's namesake, James A. Ramage, is a retired history professor from Northern Kentucky University. He received numerous awards at NKU, including Outstanding Professor of the Year (1988), Outstanding Faculty Advisor Award (1999), and Acorn Award from Kentucky Advocates for Higher Education (2003), among others. At the Phi Alpha Theta national convention in Philadelphia, January 4–6, 2006, he was elected national vice president (2006–2007) and president elect (2008–2009).

In 2004 Ramage received a University-Community Partnership Grant through NKU's Scripps Howard Center for Civil Engagement for the Battery Hooper Project. The goal was to partner with the City of Fort Wright in involving students and the public in preserving, researching, and opening Hooper Battery to the public. City Administrator Larry Klein represented the city and NKU Adjunct Professor Jeannine Kreinbrink was Archaeology Project Manager. On June 30, 2005, the project culminated with the opening of a museum on the site. Mayor Gene Weaver and the City Council named the museum in honor of Ramage's work. As of September 1, 2006, over 5,000 people had visited the James A. Ramage Civil War Museum. On December 9, 2007, Douglas Vonderhaar was honored as the museum's 10,000th visitor.

In 2021 the museum founded the Kentucky Underground Railroad Freedom Trail which connects historic sites and museums across the Commonwealth of Kentucky that tell the story of the struggle from bondage to freedom and the new life afterward. The Ramage Museum featured exhibits focused on African American heritage, including the first American American military unit Black Brigade of Cincinnati, Congressional Medal of Honor recipient Powhatan Beaty, and other African American's who were awarded the Medal of Honor for their Civil War service. Underground Railroad conductor Harriet Tubman, Margaret Garner, and Maj. Gen. Lew Wallace who in 1864 founded the first Freedmen's Bureau were also featured. Several exhibits also highlighted the struggle for the women's right to vote and women with significant involvement with the Civil War.

In 2020, Richard L. McCormick II left the museum after 14 years of involvement, coinciding with its sudden closure by Fort Wright's mayor on August 25, 2021. The closure, enacted via executive order and supported by the city council, was ostensibly due to unclear factors, although some speculate there may have been underlying reasons not publicly disclosed. The museum, though small and volunteer-run, played a significant role in preserving local history and educating visitors about unique regional Civil War events, such as the Squirrel Hunters and Black Brigade. Despite financial challenges and limited support from the city, it attracted visitors from various states and enriched the author's own historical pursuits.

== Events ==
Although the museum was an entity of the City of Fort Wright, it accepted donations in order to remain operational and hosted a variety of events. One of the most significant was the archaeological excavations of Hooper Battery. Because the battery site was filled in with dirt, it was preserved quite well. This provided an opportunity for the public to take part in archaeological activities.

== See also ==
- Cincinnati in the American Civil War
- Defense of Cincinnati
- Hooper Battery
- Kentucky in the American Civil War
