= Senator Keyes (disambiguation) =

Henry W. Keyes (1863–1938) was a U.S. Senator from New Hampshire from 1919 to 1937. Senator Keyes may also refer to:

- Henry Keyes (1810–1870), Vermont State Senate
- Orval Keyes (1913–1991), Nebraska State Senate
- Perley Keyes (1774–1834), New York State Senate

== See also ==
- Senator Key (disambiguation)
