= Police Station No. 7 (Cincinnati) =

- U.S. National Register of Historic Places
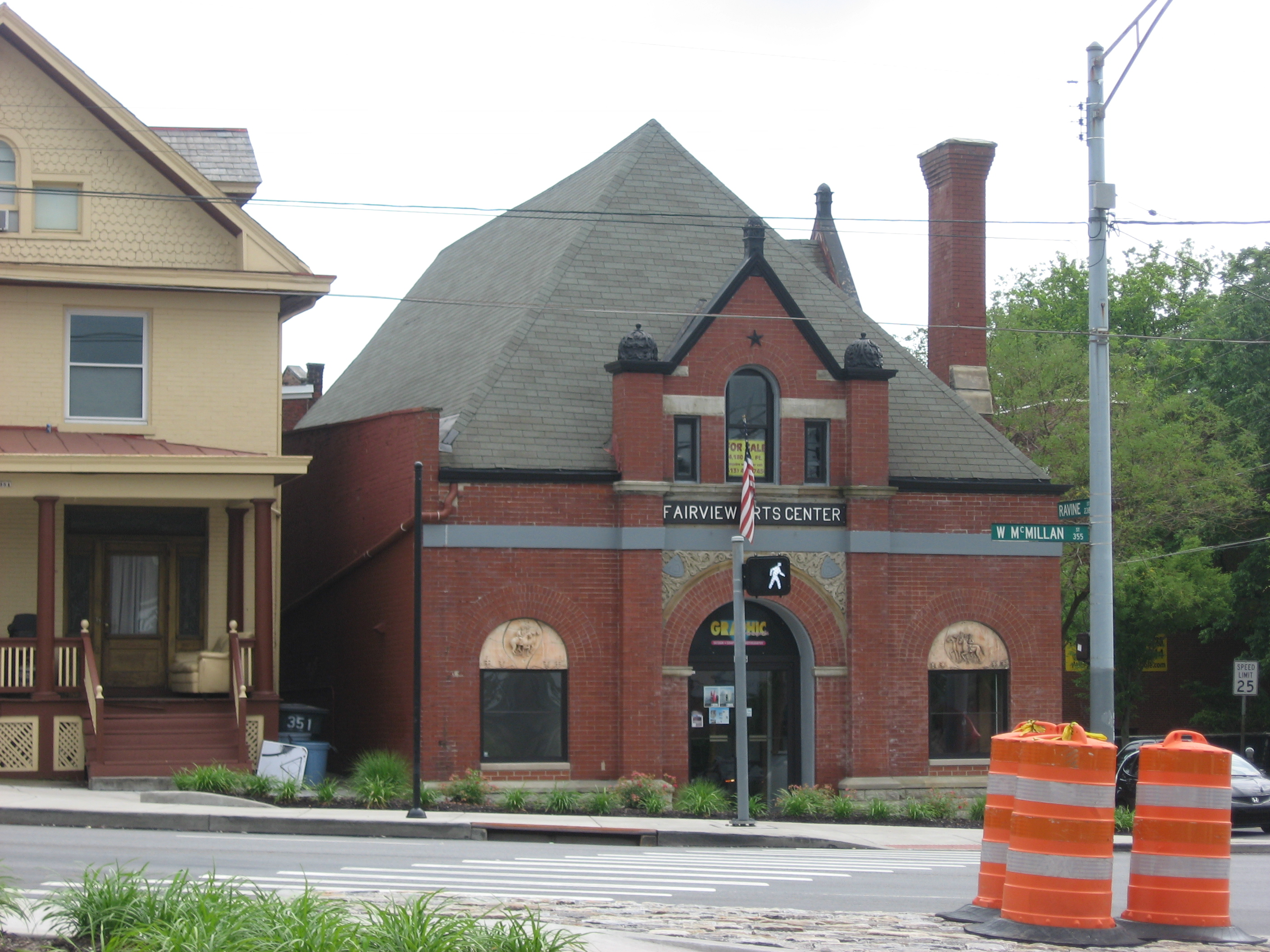
- Front of the police station
- Location: Cincinnati, Ohio
- Coordinates: 39°07′40.95″N 84°31′31.3″W
- Architect: Samuel Hannaford & Sons and Charles Rosentiel
- Architectural style: Romanesque
- MPS: Patrol Stations in Cincinnati, Ohio TR
- NRHP reference No.: 81000437
- Added to NRHP: May 18, 1981

Police Station No. 7 is a registered historic building in Cincinnati, Ohio, listed in the National Register on May 18, 1981.

== Historic uses ==
This was built as Patrol 8, the patrol house for Cincinnati's Police District 8, which was near the bottom of the hill. Patrol 8 was on top of the hill, at McMillan and Ravine St., so the horses didn't have to haul the patrol wagons up the steep hill.
