= Police Station No. 6 (Cincinnati) =

- U.S. National Register of Historic Places
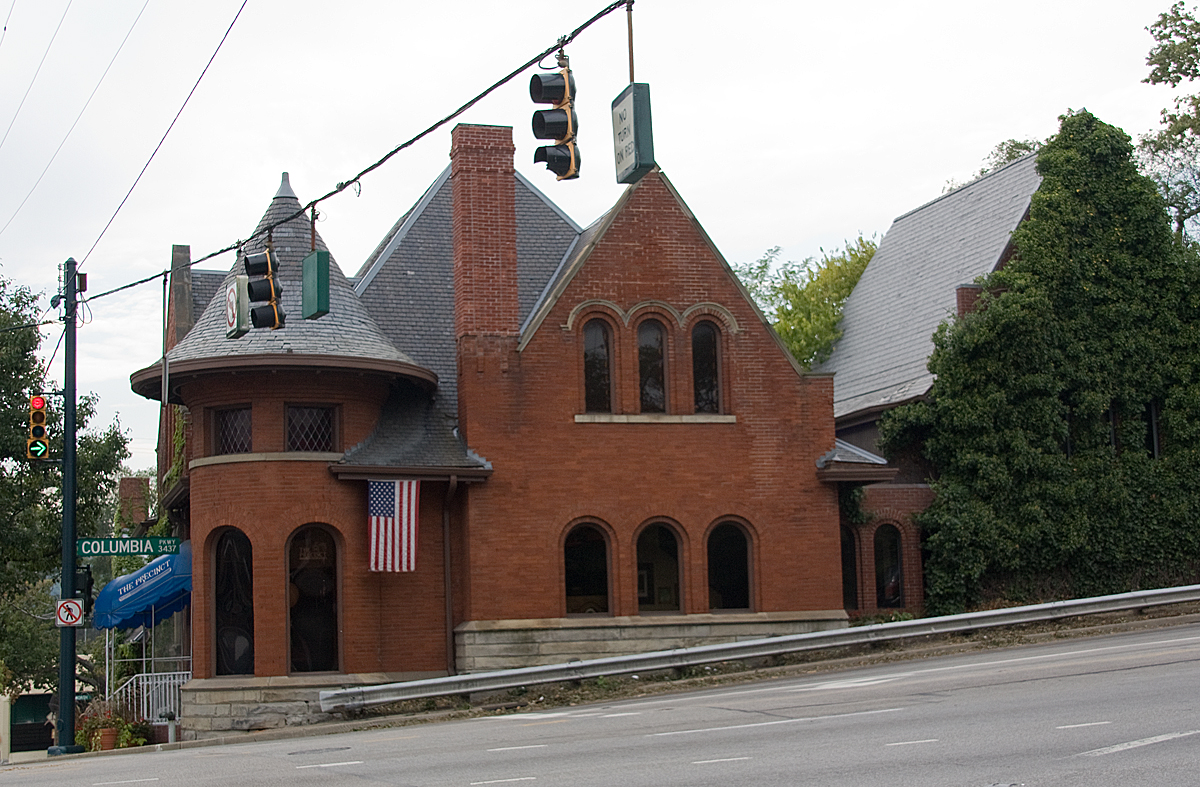
- Location: East End, Cincinnati, Ohio
- Coordinates: 39°7′1.91″N 84°26′21.42″W
- Architect: Samuel Hannaford & Sons
- Architectural style: Romanesque
- MPS: Patrol Stations in Cincinnati, Ohio TR
- NRHP reference No.: 81000436
- Added to NRHP: May 18, 1981

Police Station No. 6 is a registered historic building in the East End neighborhood of Cincinnati, Ohio, listed in the National Register on May 18, 1981. The former patrol station of the Cincinnati Police Department was designed by Samuel Hannaford & Sons and completed in 1896.

Since 1981, it has housed Jeff Ruby's Precinct steakhouse.
