= George Hatch =

1860s mayor of Cincinnati, Ohio

George Hatch was a Democratic politician, who served as Mayor of the City of Cincinnati, Ohio, during the American Civil War from 1861 to 1863.

In late spring 1862, Cincinnati city officials recognized the threat of an attack from Confederate forces under the command of Brig. Gen. John Hunt Morgan, who was riding northward through Kentucky apparently intent on crossing the Ohio River into Indiana and/or Ohio. Numerous militia groups had been organized, but the threat of nearly 2,000 veteran cavalrymen riding into downtown Cincinnati prompted Mayor George Hatch to release a proclamation calling out the local citizenry into action for the defense of Cincinnati.

"In accordance with a resolution passed by the City Council of Cincinnati on the 1st instant, I hereby request that all business, of every kind or character, be suspended at ten o’clock of this day, that all persons, employers and employees, assemble in their respective wards, at the usual places of voting, and there organize themselves in such manner as may be thought best for the defense of the city. Every man, of every age, be he citizen or alien, who lives under the protection of our laws, is expected to take part in the organization. Witness my hand, and the corporate seal of the city of Cincinnati, this second day of September, A.D. 1862".

At two o'clock on the morning of the same day, Mayor Hatch issued another proclamation, notifying the citizens that the police force would perform the duty of a provost-guard, under the direction of Gen. Lew Wallace. On September 2, 1862 despite the protests of Mayor George Hatch, the Army ordered a unit of black men, known as the Black Brigade of Cincinnati, to dig fortifications in Northern Kentucky.

Mayor Hatch's former home is located at 830 Dayton Street, in the Dayton Street Historic District. Locals named the house "Hatch's Folly" because of its size and pretentious design.
