= Richard Ramage =

Sir Richard Ogilvy Ramage, CMG, OStJ (5 January 1896 – 4 August 1971) was a British colonial administrator.

== Career ==
Born on 5 January 1896, Richard Ogilvy Ramage was the son of John T. Ramage. Following schooling at the Edinburgh Academy, Ramage served in the First World War and then, after demobilisation, he joined the Administrative Service in Nigeria in 1920, and served in the country until 1935, during the last year as Deputy Resident. He then became Assistant to the Lieutenant-Governor of Malta, before returning to serve in British colonies in Africa. In 1939, he was appointed Under Secretary in the Gold Coast, and three years later he was appointed Colonial Secretary of Sierra Leone. He served there until 1950 and then retired, but carried out various special duties in other colonies until 1955, when he was appointed Chairman of the Public Service Commission in Uganda (serving for four years); he also chaired the Police Service Commission for two years from 1957. He went on to serve on or chair a range of commissions in African colonies and post-independence governments.

Ramage was appointed a Companion of the Order of St Michael and St George in 1942 and knighted in 1958. He died on 4 August 1971, aged 75, leaving a widow (Dorothy Frances née Broome) but no children.

Political offices
Preceded by Sir Hilary Blood	Colonial Secretary of Sierra Leone; 1942–1950	Succeeded by Allan Ronald Macdonald
