= Kansas City Police Station Number 4 =

- U.S. National Register of Historic Places
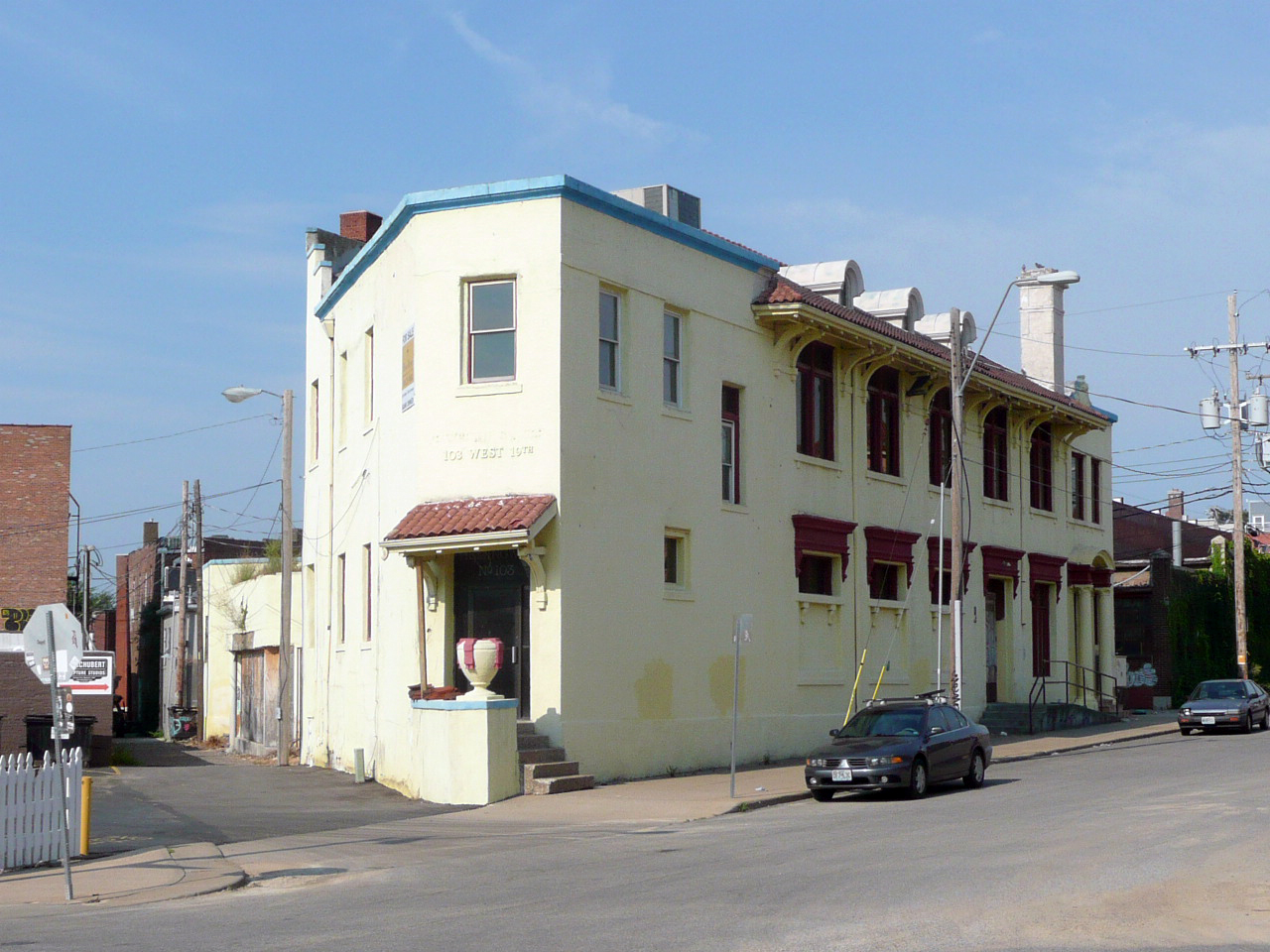
- Kansas City Police Station Number 4 in 2015

- Location within Missouri Location within the United States
- Location: 115 W. 19th St., Kansas City, Missouri
- Coordinates: 39°05′35″N 94°35′07″W
- Area: less than one acre
- Built: 1916
- Architect: Birdsall, Clarence K.; Madorie, Edgar P.
- Architectural style: Mission Revival
- MPS: Railroad Related Historic Commercial and Industrial Resources in Kansas City, Missouri MPS
- NRHP reference No.: 05001184
- Added to NRHP: October 26, 2005

The Kansas City Police Station Number 4 in Kansas City, Missouri, was built in 1916. It was listed on the National Register of Historic Places in 2005.

It was designed by architects Clarence K. Birdsall and Edgar P. Madorie in Mission Revival style.

It has also been known as Kansas City Elevator Manufacturing Company, as Tood Jack Co., as Turner Elevator Manufacturing Co., and as Works Progress Administration Office.

== Popular culture ==
Kansas City Police Station Number 4 plays a prominent role in the historical fiction book series 'Illicit Spirits' by Sarah A. Morris.
