= William M. Dickson =

American judge (1827–1889)

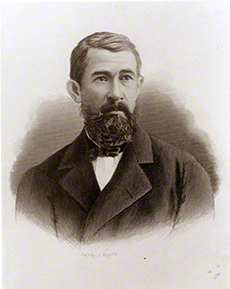
William Martin Dickson (1827–1889) was a lawyer, prosecuting attorney, judge, Civil War officer of Cincinnati, Ohio

William Martin Dickson, also known as William M. Dickson (1827–1889), was a lawyer, prosecuting attorney, and judge from Cincinnati, Ohio, United States. He was one of the founders of the Republican Party and assisted in the framing of the Emancipation Proclamation. Alphonso Taft, the father of President and Chief Justice William Howard Taft, and Thomas Marshall Key were his law partners.

He formed and led the Black Brigade of Cincinnati that built a blockade to prevent Confederate troops from attacking Cincinnati. A semi-invalid after the war, he wrote about political and social reform for the last 23 years of his life.

A relative by marriage, Dickson was a presidential elector supporting Lincoln during the 1860 election. His wife, Annie Maria Palmer, was the first cousin of Mary Todd Lincoln.

== Early life and education ==
Dickson was born on September 19, 1827, in Lexington, Scott County, Indiana, to Richard L. Dickson and Rachel Lowry (1801–1860), (Note: Coleman states that his father was Jacob and he was a minister.) who married in Madison, Indiana, on November 20, 1825, and settled in Scott County. Richard, a farmer, immigrated to the United States from Scotland. (Note: His grandfather was Rev. Jacob Dickson, a Presbyterian minister from Scotland, who presided over one parish for 50 years. It was located at Mouswald near Dumfries.) Rachel, born in Rockingham County, Virginia, on March 22, 1801, descended from the early Campbell and Lowry families of Virginia. (Note: Her parents were Joseph and Nancy Ochiltree Lowry. They came to Scott County, Indiana in 1816 and ran a farm. Her mother died at Lexington, Indiana in 1845 and her father died in Scott County in 1857. Rachel and other Lowry family members moved to West Grove, Iowa.) William's father died in 1835, when William was eight years old. (Note: Reed states that his father died in 1837.) Rachel moved her family to Hanover, Indiana, where there was a better school. William was described as having "weak" health as a child.

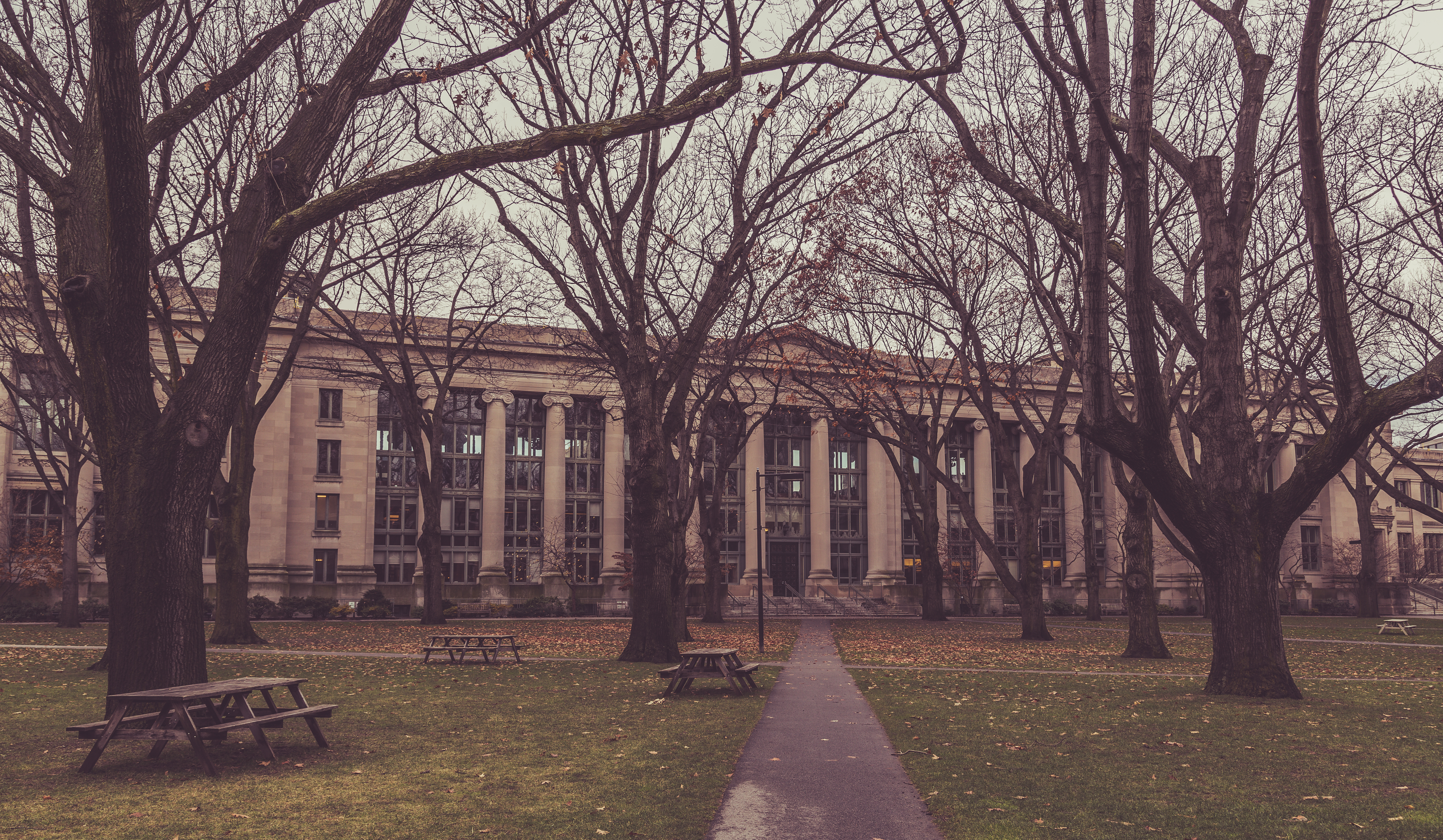
Harvard Law School

He had an older brother named John J. Dickson, who was born in 1826. John learned the copper trade so that William could go to school. John quit the copper trade and his mother Rachel moved to Iowa, settling in West Grove in 1850. He established a farm and wrote poetry, publishing the book A Farmer's Thoughts In Prose and Poetry. (Note: John J. Dickson was born in 1826. During the Civil War, he served under Sherman and in 1864 participated in Sherman's March to the Sea. He was a published poet. He married Mary Eliza Park, who was the sister of Annie Marie Parker who married his brother. John and Mary Eliza had 10 children.)

William worked his way through college, first attending Hanover College. The college merged to Madison University, requiring William to walk to school in Madison. For two years, he stayed the weekends in Hanover and walked to school each Monday morning, carrying a week's worth of food and books. He then studied at Miami University in Oxford, Ohio, where he graduated the fifth of his class in 1846. He was nineteen years old. In Lexington, Kentucky, he learned the law through self-study, while earning an income as a teacher. In 1848, he was admitted to the bar in Kentucky. He then studied at the Harvard Law School for two years and received his LLB in 1850. Chief Justice Joel Parker, a professor at Harvard, brought him into his household and treated him like a member of the family while he studied at Harvard. Parker provided a letter of introduction for Nathaniel Wright in Cincinnati, since he decided to move to the area but did not know anyone in the city.

== Career ==
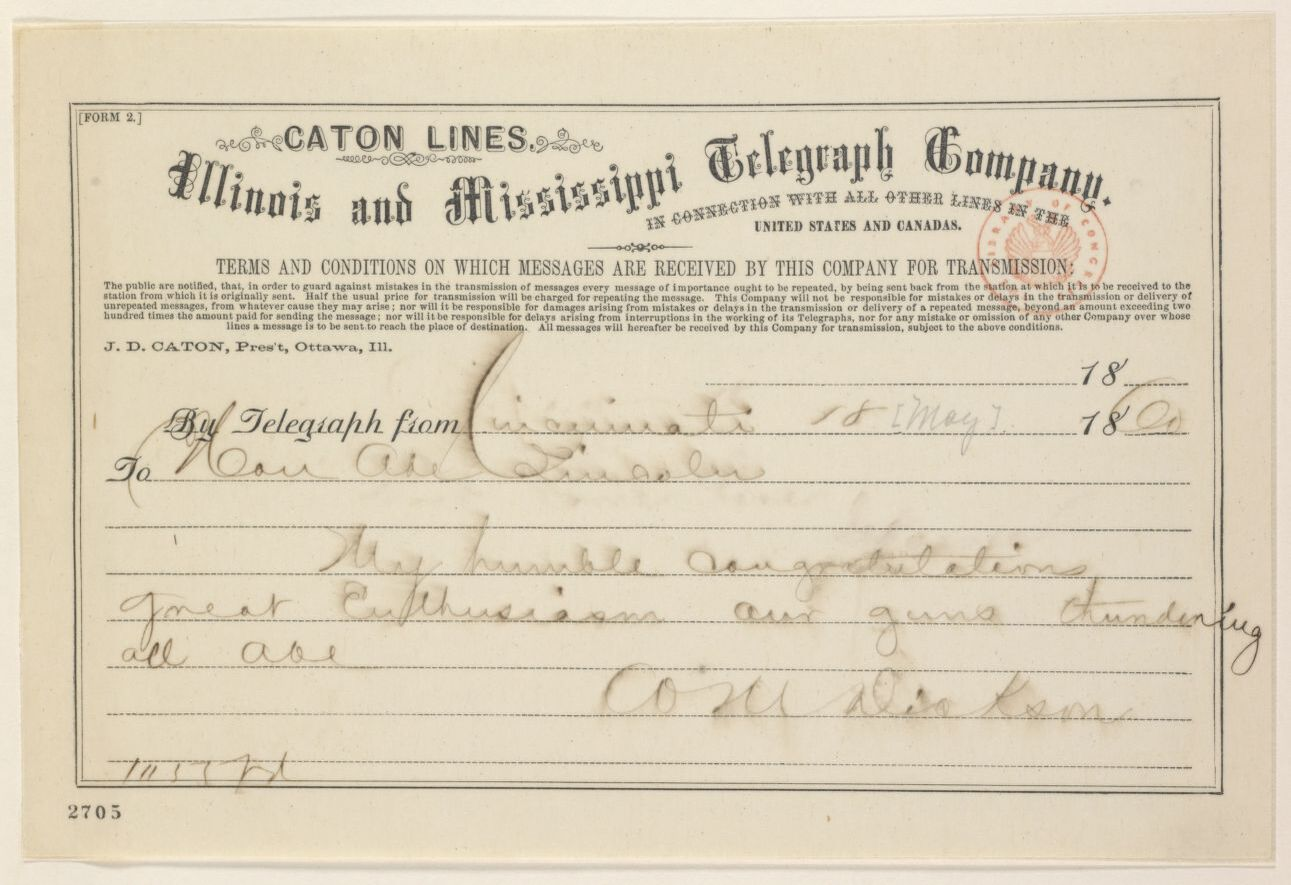
Telegraph to Abraham Lincoln on May 18, 1860: To Hon Abe Lincoln / My humble congratulations great Enthusiasm our guns thundering all Abe / Wm Dickson

After law school, Dickson moved to Cincinnati. Nathaniel Wright, a judge in Cincinnati, took Dickson into his home for two years. He was a tutor for the Wright family, a reporter at the Cincinnati Times, and a teacher of Greek at St. John's College. He won the election for prosecuting attorney of the police court in Cincinnati in 1853, and he was the first person to hold that position. He won the favor of the area Germans based on his handling of the Bedinia riots case. He sought to support slaves in fugitive slave cases. He formed a law firm in April 1854 with Thomas Marshall Key and Alphonso Taft, the father of resident and Chief Justice William Howard Taft. He then transferred his interest in the firm to another lawyer and established his own law firm about 1855. In 1859, he received an appointment of a Common Pleas Court judgeship by Governor Salmon P. Chase. (Note: Coleman said that he practiced law with two of Chase's sons, but he did not have two sons according to his obituary that mentions that he was survived by his daughter Kate Chase Sprague and a Mrs. Hoty.) In 1860, he was an Ohio presidential elector. Dickson was one of the founders of the Republican Party. He declined an offer to become an assistant judge advocate by General George B. McClellan in 1861.

He was an abolitionist, an advocate of the Fugitive Slave Law, and he fought for desegregation of the city's street cars. During the Civil War he organized and led the Black Brigade of Cincinnati as they built a blockade to prevent the Confederate Army from attacking Cincinnati. He received the order by Major-General Lew Wallace on September 4, 1862, to command the Black Brigade of Cincinnati to build fortifications near Newport and Covington, Kentucky. At the conclusion of their work, Brigade members presented a sword as an award to Dickson for his kindness and leadership after they had been brutally rounded-up, penned, and forced to do work that they had attempted to volunteer to do. The brigade had 1,000 members, 700 of which built fortifications and 300 that were assigned other tasks for the military and city. As the brigade's leader, Dickson had ensured that the men under his command received the same treatment as white soldiers. They were the first group of African-Americans that were employed for military purposes by the Union Army. In December 1862, Dickson met or communicated with Edwin Stanton, Salmon P. Chase and Abraham Lincoln to discuss his ideas for the Emancipation Proclamation, and is considered a contributor to the proclamation.

For many years, he was a trustee and president of the board of trustees of the Ohio Medical College.

== Marriage ==
He met Anne Marie Parker in Lexington, Kentucky, in 1850. She was the daughter of Dr. John Todd Parker and Jane Logan Allen and a first cousin of Mary Todd Lincoln. Dickson married Anne Marie Parker on October 18, or October, 19 1852. They lived at 171 Longworth Street in Cincinnati and had six children. Three of their daughters—Mary, Annie and Lillie—did not live past their third year. Three other children lived through adulthood: Parker, William Lowry, and Jennie. He traveled for entertainment and trying to improve his health, he sought out physicians in the United States and Europe. In 1891, the family traveled to Derry, Ireland to see the old Lowry house and also to Scotland, near Dumfries, to see Rev. Jacob Dickson's manse and church at Mouswald. His mother, Rachel, traveled with them.

In 1857, Abraham Lincoln was hired to try the McCormick Reaper patent case in the U.S. Circuit Court in Cincinnati, during that trial he stayed with Dickson and his wife. Edwin Stanton, who was on the legal team, decided to not have Lincoln speak at the trial, he considered Lincoln a "gangly country lawyer". Since he did not need to be at the trial, Dickson showed him the sites of the city.

== Later years and death ==
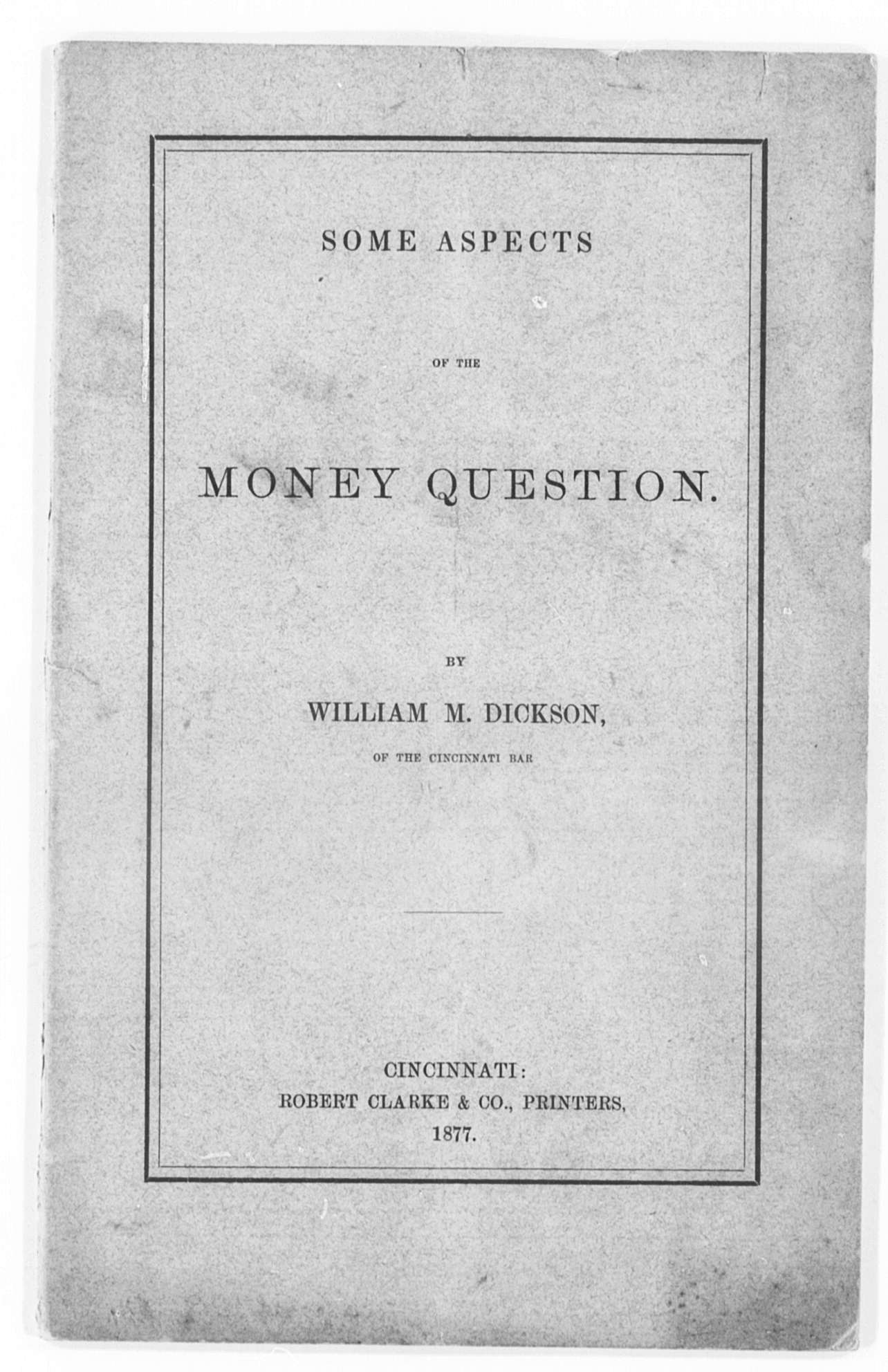
Book cover for Some Aspects of the Money Question by William M. Dickson, 1877

He had suffered from "nervous prostration" after the war, which had caused Dickson to leave politics and the law at age 39. He was a semi-invalid for 23 years, during which he "despaired at the corruption and machine politics which increasingly characterized his party during the Gilded Age of late nineteenth century America." He wrote about black suffrage, reconstruction, civil service reform, and other topics often under the initials W.M.D. Dickson wrote a memoir entitled Lincoln at Cincinnati.

He died on October 15, 1889 at the hospital in Cincinnati due to his injuries from the Mount Auburn incline accident. Five other people died, too. He was buried in the family plot at the Spring Grove Cemetery in Cincinnati. His wife, Annie Maria Parker Dickson died March 6, 1885.

Judge Dickson was learned, fearless and impartial, as a citizen he was public spirited and generous, and in private life he was exemplary to the highest degree.

— Charles Greve, Centennial History of Cincinnati and Representative Citizens

== Legacy ==
- A statue at the Smale Riverfront Park depicts Dickson receiving a ceremonial sword from Marshall P. H. Jones, a member of the Black Brigade of Cincinnati.
