= Quincy Police Station =

- U.S. National Register of Historic Places
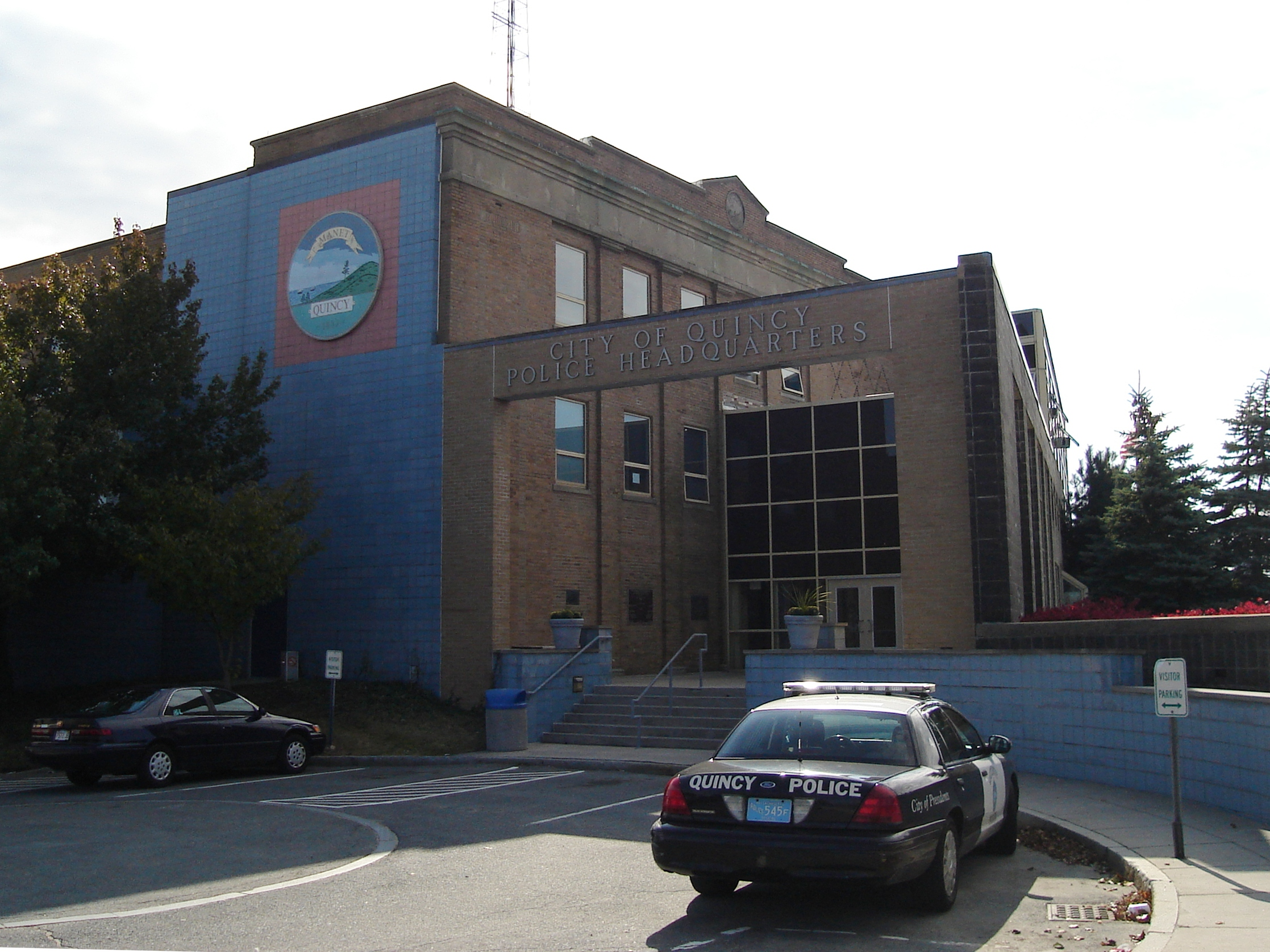

- Location within Massachusetts Location within the United States
- Location: 1 Sea Street, Quincy, Massachusetts
- Coordinates: 42°15′21″N 70°59′47″W
- Area: 8.51 acres (3.44 ha)
- Built: 1925
- Architect: Clark, Batty & Gallagher
- Architectural style: Classical Revival
- Demolished: 2026
- MPS: Quincy MRA
- NRHP reference No.: 89001373
- Added to NRHP: March 08, 1990

The Quincy Police Station was a historic police station located at 1 Sea Street in Quincy, Massachusetts.

The original three-story yellow brick Classical Revival structure was designed by the local firm of Clark, Batty and Gallagher, and built in 1925 for $75,000. It was the city's first purpose-built police station. It had only modest styling, including brick pilasters separating its window bays, and a simple cornice topped by a parapet which had a raised section containing the city seal. The building was listed on the National Register of Historic Places in 1990. The building had a modern addition made to it, before being replaced by the Quincy Public Safety building in 2026. The demolition of the building began May 2026, and is planned to become a green space.

== See also ==
- National Register of Historic Places listings in Quincy, Massachusetts
