= Black Brigade of Cincinnati =

- Active: September 2, 1862 - September 20, 1862
- Allegiance: United States of America
- Branch: Cincinnati volunteer militia Union Army
- Size: Battalion-brigade (700)
- Nickname: Black Brigade
- Engagements: No combat experience

Commanders
- Notable commanders: Lew Wallace; William M. Dickson

The Black Brigade of Cincinnati was a military unit of African-American soldiers, that was organized in 1862 during the American Civil War, when the city of Cincinnati, Ohio, was in danger of being attacked, by the Confederate Army. The members of the Cincinnati "Black Brigade" were among the first African Americans to be employed in the military defense of the Union. The fortifications—including forts, miles of military roads, miles of rifle pits, magazines, and hundreds of acres of cleared forests—at the border of Northern Kentucky thwarted the major threat to Cincinnati during the Civil War.

== Brigade service ==
=== Background ===
Race relations in Cincinnati at the time were incredibly volatile. While the city had more than its share of exceptional abolition leaders before the American Civil War, the attitude of Cincinnatians in general towards abolitionism was one of open hostility. Most of the citizens discountenanced the institution of slavery but were willing to wink at its continuance in the South for financial reasons. The intensity of sentiments has risen up to destruction of property, killings, and mob violence against blacks since about the 1830s. Peter H. Clark states, "Nowhere has the prejudice against colored people been more cruelly manifested than here." Cincinnati, which lies along the Ohio River in southern Ohio, bordered the Union-held slave state of Kentucky. People from Ohio were "aggressively barring" blacks from migrating to the state. State laws, called the Black Laws of 1804 and 1807, required that blacks provided proof that they were free and posted $500 guaranteeing good behavior. Blacks did not have the right to vote. They could not testify against white people in trials, whether by law before 1849 or mob rule after the law preventing their testimony was overturned.

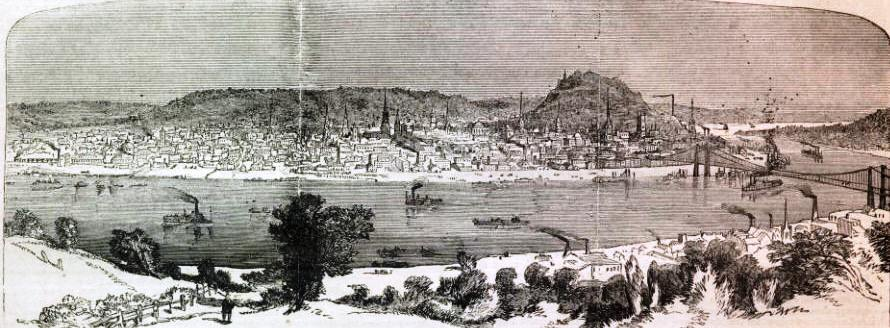
Cincinnati, September 27, 1862, lithograph, Harper's Weekly. View north from Kentucky.

=== Volunteer force proposed ===
In August 1862, with the imminent threat of a Confederate attack, black Cincinnatians met to organize a home guard and offer their services in defense of the Union cause in defense of their city. Hearing that they were meeting to discuss providing service during the war, there were attempts to shut down the meeting and intimidate attendees. The Commercial stated that black men should not interfere in the war. Their offer was refused by the city, and they were told there no need for their help in a "white man's war." This was contrary to the wishes of Maj. Gen. Lew Wallace who intended to enlist the help of the city's black residents to construct defensive fortifications.

=== Advancing Confederate troops ===
On August 30, Confederate troops defeated the hastily assembled Army of Kentucky at the Battle of Richmond, Kentucky, about 100 miles south of Cincinnati. By early September 1862, Union Army regiments from Ohio, Indiana, and other northern states were ordered the Cincinnati area to defend it from the advancing Confederate Army. Wallace placed the city under martial law on September 1 and assumed command of the city. Mayor George Hatch asked for all men to assist in the defense of the city and that the police force would be placed under Wallace's command and act as provost guards.

=== Men unexpectedly forced into service ===
On September 2, 1862, the Cincinnati police force abruptly and forcefully impressed male black residents to construct fortifications, often at gunpoint and with rough treatment, and without a plan or explanation. The men were gathered and put in a mule pen on Plum Street, not knowing what would become of them and fearfully that they might be left in Kentucky and become enslaved.

If the guard appointed to the duty of collecting the colored people had gone to their houses and notified them to report for duty on the fortifications, the order would have been cheerfully obeyed. But the brutal ruffians who composed the regular and special police took every opportunity to inflict abuse and insult upon the men whom they arrested.

— Peter Clark, Black Brigade of Cincinnati

Some of the men labored at the river and others were taken at bayonet to work as servants, camp cooks and laundrymen for Union troops. About 400 men were taken to regimental camps and were held there. They were held for two days, during which they worked continuously for 36 hours without sleep and received half rations of food. The treatment was denounced by the Cincinnati Daily Gazette, that stated "Let our colored fellow-soldiers be treated civilly" and "treated like men". It was the only local newspaper to condemn the unjust treatment.

=== Fortifications ===
Alarmed by reports of the mishandling by the police force and mistreatment by the army, Wallace put Colonel William M. Dickson in charge, who let the seized men return to their homes and announced a new call for black volunteers to report the next day. In the meantime, the police were relieved of provost guard duty and promised not to arrest any more black men, except for criminal activity. Black men who had escaped to the country or were securely hidden to avoid coming under control of the provost guards, returned to the city.

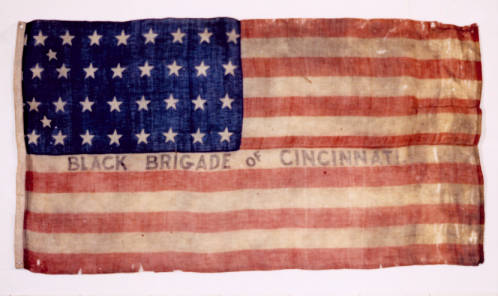
1862 Black Brigade of Cincinnati Flag provided by William M. Dickson and James Lupton, Dickson's aide, is now at the Ohio Historical Society. For a digitial reproduction, see Black brigade of Cincinnati flag

At 5 a.m. on September 5, 706 volunteers reported for duty and were put to work. The officers of the brigade as of September 6, 1862 were all white and included: commander, William M. Dickson; Adjutant-General, T. C. Day; Commissary, H. McBurney; Quartermaster, J. S. Hill; Assistant Adjutant-General, Jacob Reior. With Dickson in charge, the soldiers of the Black Brigade received their own military unit flag and $13 a month—a Union Army private's pay—along with various privileges, including the right to visit their families.

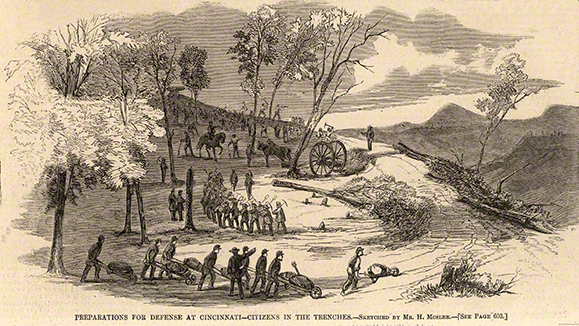
Henry Mosler, Preparations for Defense at Cincinnati, sketch, Harper’s Weekly, September 20, 1862

Put "far in advance of the Union lines" and without weapons, a pontoon bridge was built to bring the Black Brigade into Northern Kentucky. The Black Brigade commenced work that consisted of digging rifle pits, clearing trees as well as building forts, magazines, and roads. They often conducted work almost a mile in front of the front lines, with only a few cavalry scouts between them and Confederate forces. They were nearly mistaken for Confederate soldiers due to how far they were from Union troops.

A mural depicting the "Squirrel Hunters", local militia from Ohio, marching in Defense of Cincinnati (1862). (Note: Forces established to defend Cincinnati did not need to fire a shot during the Civil War.)

Confederate General Henry Heth led 8,000 soldiers from Louisville, Kentucky to the area by September 11. They reconnoitered for two days and then withdrew, believing that they would not be successful there in a battle with a volunteer force of 76,000 "Squirrel Hunters" who had assembled in the Defense of Cincinnati.

The brigade continued to work until September 20, when there was no longer a threat to Cincinnati. When they were done, hundreds of acres of forests had been cleared and miles of rifle pits were dug. They had built forts, magazines, and miles of military roads and breastworks along the border with Northern Kentucky between Fort Thomas and Bromley. The fortifications were built far enough away from Cincinnati that they could not shell the city.

There were a total of 1,000 black men who served in defence of the city. There were the 700 men who built the fortifications and another 300 men who performed work in military camps, in the city, and on gun boats. The Brigade had one fatality: Joseph Johns who was killed when a tree fell on him by accident on September 17, 1862.

Dickson was presented with an engraved sword by the members of the brigade. He thanked them by stating, "...you have labored cheerfully and effectively. Go to your homes with the consciousness of having performed your duty.....and bearing with you the gratitude and respect of all honorable men." The most significant threat to Cincinnati from the Confederates during the Civil War occurred in 1862 and the fortifications built by the Black Brigade are credited with thwarting that threat.

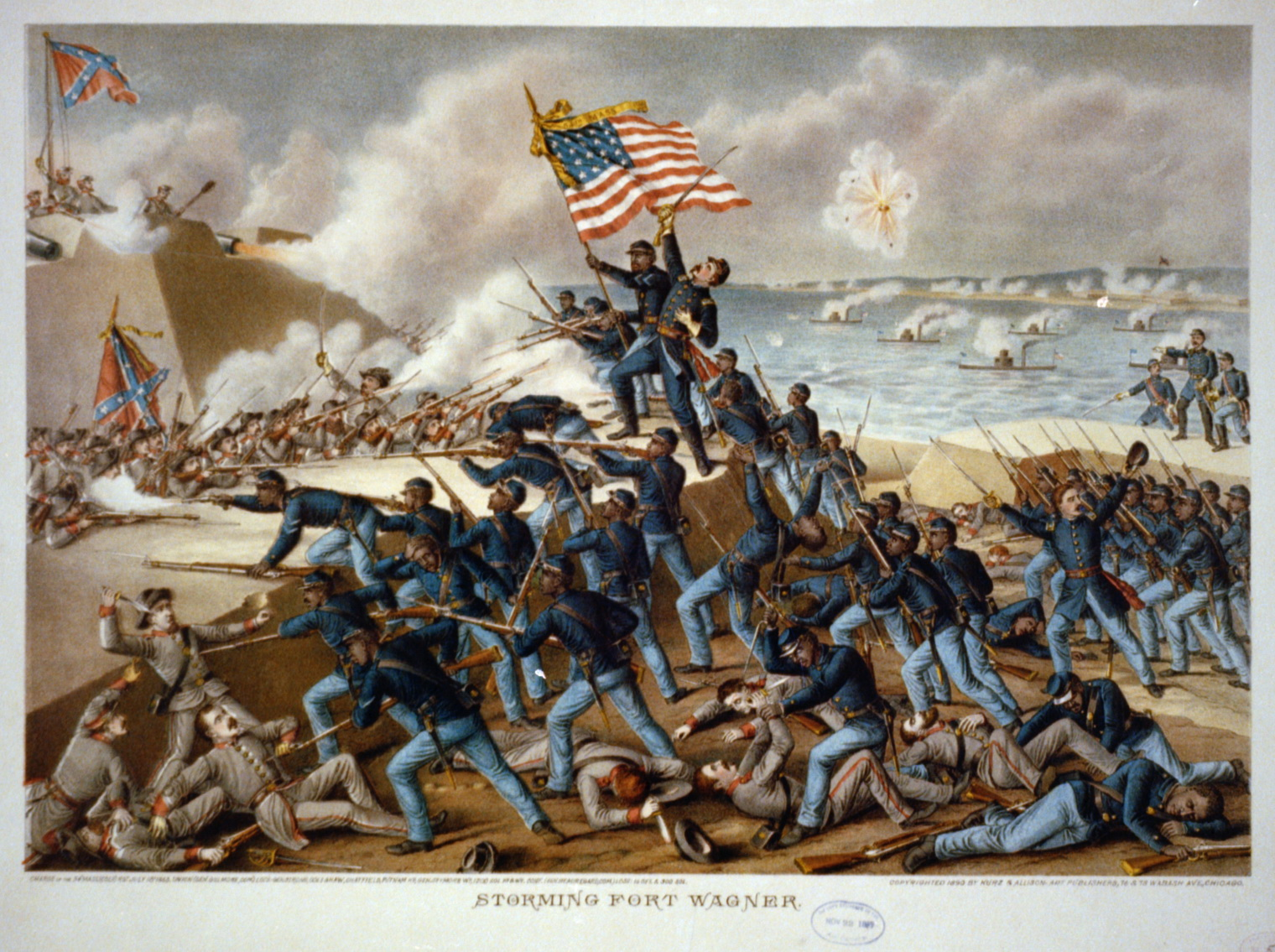
54th Massachusetts Infantry Regiment, The Storming of Fort Wagner, 1890, by Kurz and Allison

Because of racial segregation, the city would not allow black men to join the all-white volunteer militia. The Black Brigade was never intended to serve as armed soldiers, and saw no combat during the war. There were some men, though, who enlisted in the 54th Massachusetts Infantry Regiment or in other regiments of the Union Army, like the Corps d'Afrique and 75th Regiment Infantry U.S. Colored Troops in the Mississippi Valley.

== Legacy ==
The Black Brigade of Cincinnati was the first organization of African Americans to be used for military purposes by the North during the American Civil War.

In 2012, a resolution was passed within the U.S. Senate recognizing members of Cincinnati Black Brigade as veterans.

== Memorial monument ==
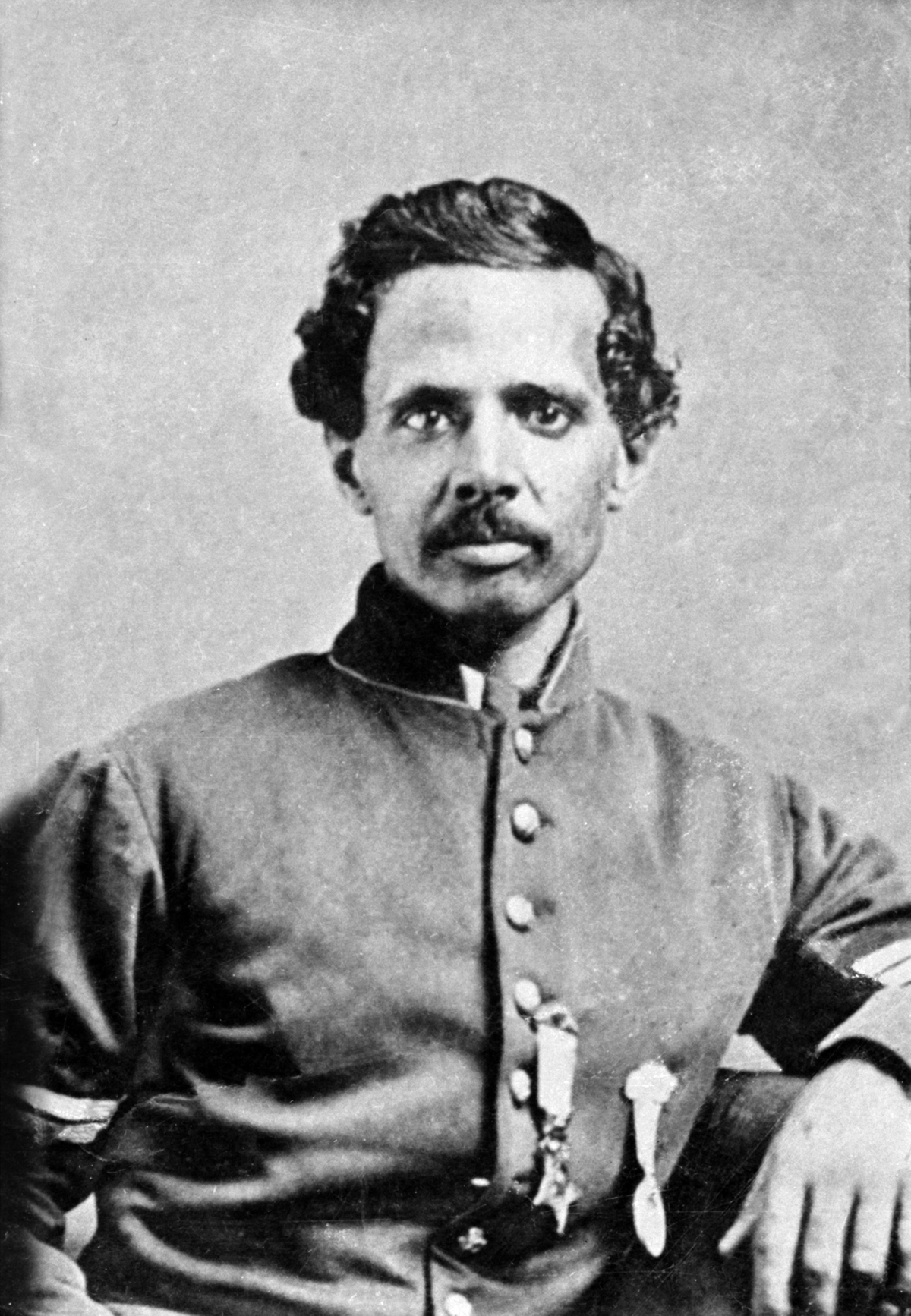
Powhatan Beaty, a former soldier, of the Black Brigade of Cincinnati, enlisted in the 5th United States Colored Cavalry Regiment. He became a first sergeant and was later awarded the Medal of Honor, for his valiant service in the September 1864 Battle of Chaffin's Farm

During the 150th anniversary of the 1862 defense of Cincinnati, a memorial monument to the Black Brigade was dedicated in Smale Riverfront Park in Cincinnati on September 9, 2012. Designed by Jan Brown Checco and Sasaki Associates, sculptors John Hebenstreit and Carolyn Manto created three life-size bronze figures, relief panels, while Tyrone Williams composed poetry to express the soldiers inner thoughts, and Erik Brown established the application of texts. The names of all 700 soldiers in the Black Brigade are etched in stone.

== Soldiers ==
- Captain Peter Fossett of Second Regiment, Company F
- Powhatan Beaty of Third Regiment, Company 1
- William Grandstaff, Company A

== See also ==
- Contraband (American Civil War)
- Military history of African Americans in the American Civil War
- List of Ohio Civil War units
- James A. Ramage Civil War Museum § The Black Brigade of Cincinnati
