= Thomas Marshall Key =

American politician

Thomas Marshall Key (August 8, 1819 – January 15, 1869) was an American politician.

== Early life and education ==
Key was the son of Marshall Key, a connection of Chief Justice Marshall, and was born in Mason County, Kentucky on August 8, 1819. He graduated from Augusta College in Kentucky, and entered Yale College where he graduated in 1838.

== Career ==
Key went to Cincinnati after graduation and began practice of the law, as partner of Alphonso Taft and William M. Dickson in April 1854. In 1848 the Commercial Court of Cincinnati was established, of which he served as Judge for five years. He resumed practice of law in 1853, and continued in it, in partnership and alone, until the outbreak of the American Civil War.

In 1858, Key was elected a member of the Ohio State Senate on the Democratic ticket. While still a state Senator, the attack on Fort Sumter occurred. Judge Key took an active and controlling part in securing unanimous action in the Ohio Legislature for the support of the National Government. In this he was brought into contact with General McClellan, becoming Judge Advocate on his staff with the rank of Colonel, and received in an unusual degree the confidence of his commander. He remained in this position while General McClellan continued in command. While stationed in Washington, he drafted, and promoted the passage of, the bill abolishing slavery in the District of Columbia. When McClellan was removed, Key returned to the labors of his profession in Cincinnati.

== Marriage, health issues, death ==
Key was married, June, 1858, to Mrs. Elizabeth B. Boylan. He contracted pulmonary disease under the exposure of the Chickahominy and Antietam campaigns, and was never well afterward. He died at Lebanon, Ohio on January 15, 1869.

This article incorporates public domain material from the Yale Obituary Record.
