= Hooper Battery =

Hilltop earthworks fortification

Coordinates: 39°03′20″N 84°31′38″W

Hooper Battery was a hilltop earthworks fortification, built for the Defense of Cincinnati during the American Civil War in Northern Kentucky by the Union Army to turn back invading Confederate troops. It was constructed to protect Cincinnati and the Ohio River valley. The battery overlooks the Licking River valley in an advantageous position.

Initially, Major General Lew Wallace, commanding the defenses of Cincinnati in September 1862, utilized the defensive engineering skills of Colonel Charles Whittlesey, who had commanded the 20th Ohio Infantry in one of Wallace's brigades until after the Battle of Shiloh when he resigned due to age. Whittlesey had originally planned the defenses of Cincinnati in 1861 while under the command of Brigadier General Ormsby M. Mitchel, commander of the Department of the Ohio, and Wallace had found them insufficient and in need of considerable repair. Wallace appointed Whittlesey a member of his staff and he immediately created work parties for reinforcing the defenses. Whittlesey remained part of Wallace's staff until he was replaced by Major James H. Simpson of the United States Army Corps of Topographical Engineers who was charged by Maj. Gen. Horatio Wright, commander of the Department of the Ohio, to continue reinforcing and upgrading Cincinnati's defenses.

Within five days of preparing to defend Cincinnati an estimated 75,000 men showed up to the defense 60,000 men where irregulars.

Hooper Battery is one of six remaining artillery batteries from the 28 that were built on Northern Kentucky hilltops from 1861 to 1864.

The site was the home of the James A. Ramage Civil War Museum, which closed in 2021.
