= Alison Ramage =

British mathematician

Alison Ramage is a British applied mathematician and numerical analyst specialising in preconditioning methods for numerical linear algebra, and their applications to the numerical solution of partial differential equations. She is a reader in the Department of Mathematics and Statistics at the University of Strathclyde.

== Education and career ==
Ramage is a graduate of the University of St Andrews. She completed her PhD in 1991 at the University of Bristol. Her dissertation, Preconditioned Conjugate Gradient Methods for Galerkin Finite Element Equations, was supervised by Andrew Wathen, and involved preconditioners for the Galerkin method.

She is a member of the board of trustees of the Society for Industrial and Applied Mathematics.

She currently serves as Chair of the Society for Industrial and Applied Mathematics (SIAM) Board of Trustees.

== Research ==
Ramage's thesis involved preconditioners for the Galerkin method, and applications to the numerical solution of partial differential equations in computational fluid dynamics, including those for incompressible flow and advection–diffusion equations. Subsequently, she has applied her research to other areas including geotechnical engineering, financial mathematics, modeling liquid crystals, weather forecasting, and sensor networks.
