= Old Pine Street Station =

Historic police station in Maryland, USA

- U.S. National Register of Historic Places
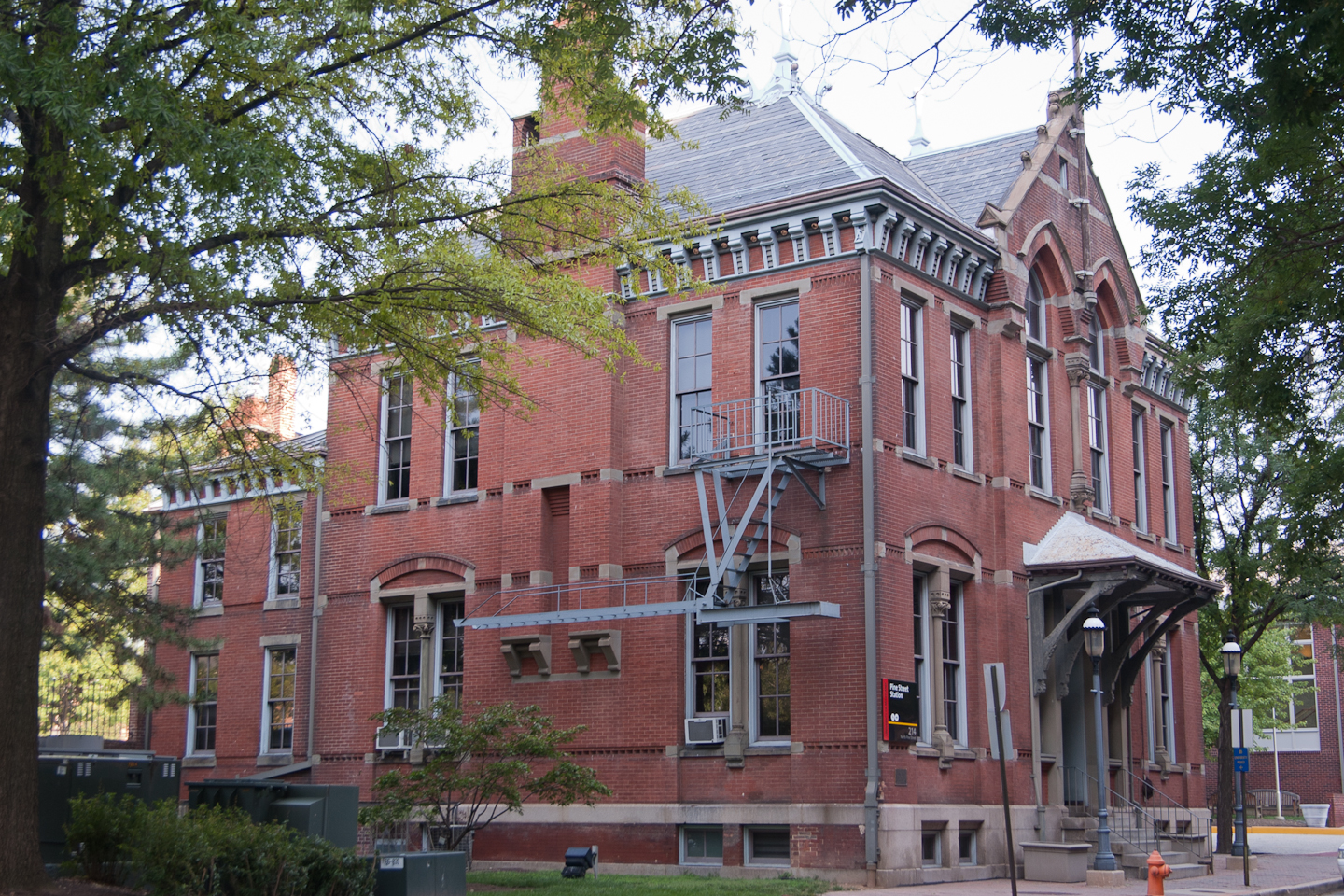
- Old Pine Street Station, August 2011

- Location within Baltimore Location within Maryland Location within the United States
- Location: 214 N. Pine St., Baltimore, Maryland
- Coordinates: 39°17′30″N 76°37′40″W
- Area: less than one acre
- Built: 1877
- Architect: Davis, Francis E.
- Architectural style: Gothic, High Victorian Gothic
- NRHP reference No.: 85000018
- Added to NRHP: January 3, 1985

Old Pine Street Station, also known as the Old Western District Police Station House, is a historic police station located at Baltimore, Maryland, United States. It is a freestanding brick building of two stories raised on a partially exposed basement in the quintessential brick Victorian Gothic style. It was constructed 1877–78.

The station was to be torn down to make way for a highway, but was saved through the efforts of preservationists and the demise of the highway project. The building is now used as a police station for the University of Maryland, Baltimore Police.

Old Pine Street Station was listed on the National Register of Historic Places in 1985.
