= Police Station No. 3 (Cincinnati) =

- U.S. National Register of Historic Places
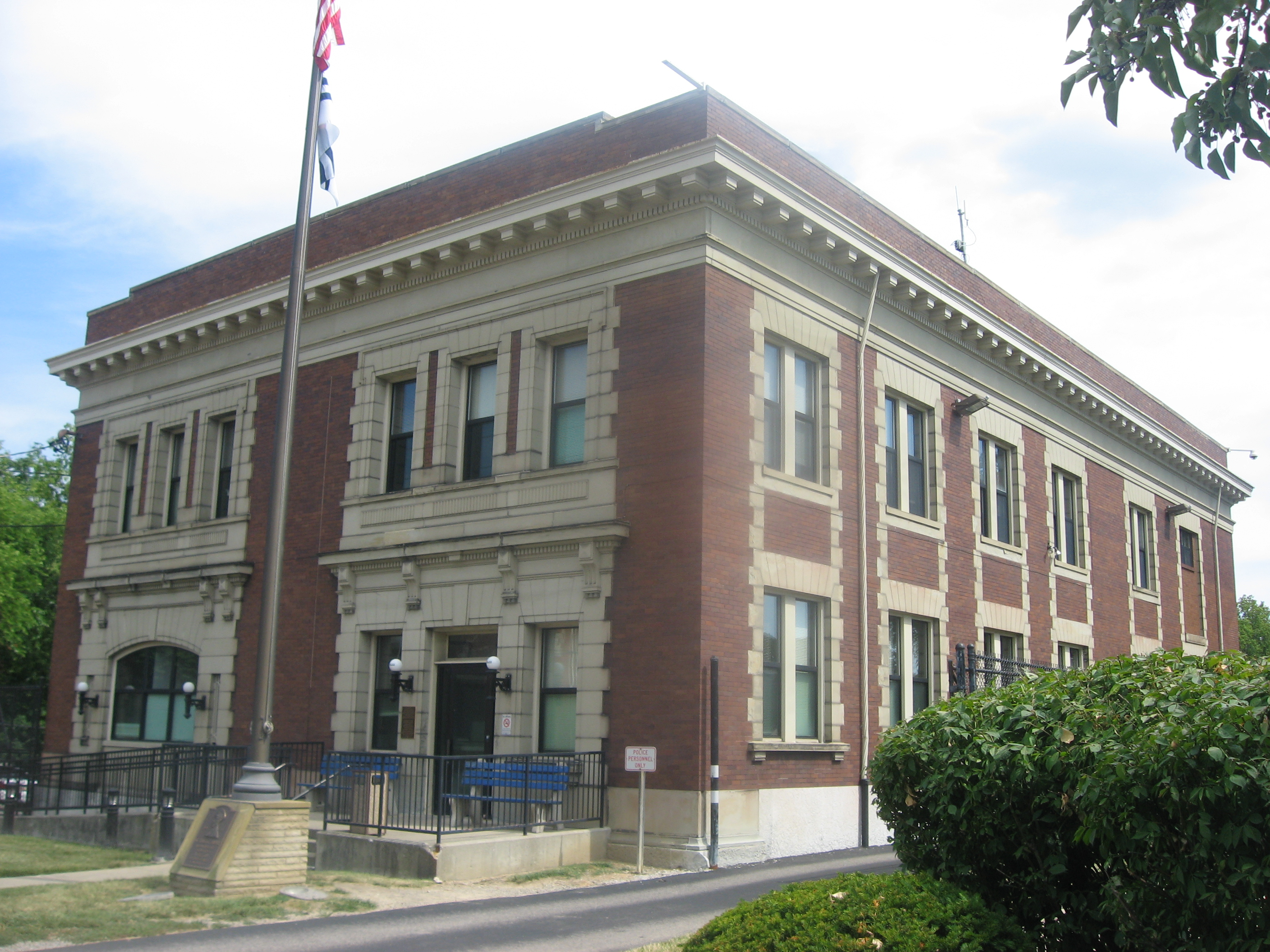
- Front and western side

- Location within Ohio Location within the United States
- Location: Cincinnati, Ohio
- Coordinates: 39°6′35.63″N 84°33′47.43″W
- Architect: William Miller & Son
- Architectural style: Classical Revival
- MPS: Patrol Stations in Cincinnati, Ohio TR
- NRHP reference No.: 81000435
- Added to NRHP: May 18, 1981

Police Station No. 3 is a registered historic building in Cincinnati, Ohio, listed in the National Register on May 18, 1981.

The Cincinnati Police Station at 3201 Warsaw Avenue opened December 31, 1908. It was a combined station house and patrol house, which accommodated 40 patrolmen, a patrol wagon, and 16 horses for mounted patrol. Designated the Ninth District and Patrol Nine upon opening, it was re-designated as District 3 in 1927.

On December 14, 2008, community groups joined with the police department and the Greater Cincinnati Police Historical Society to celebrate the building's centennial. A plaque on front of the building commemorates that event. District 3's operations moved from this building to a new station in June 2015. The station on Warsaw Avenue station is still used by Cincinnati Police Traffic Units.
