= Police Station No. 2 (Cincinnati) =

- U.S. National Register of Historic Places
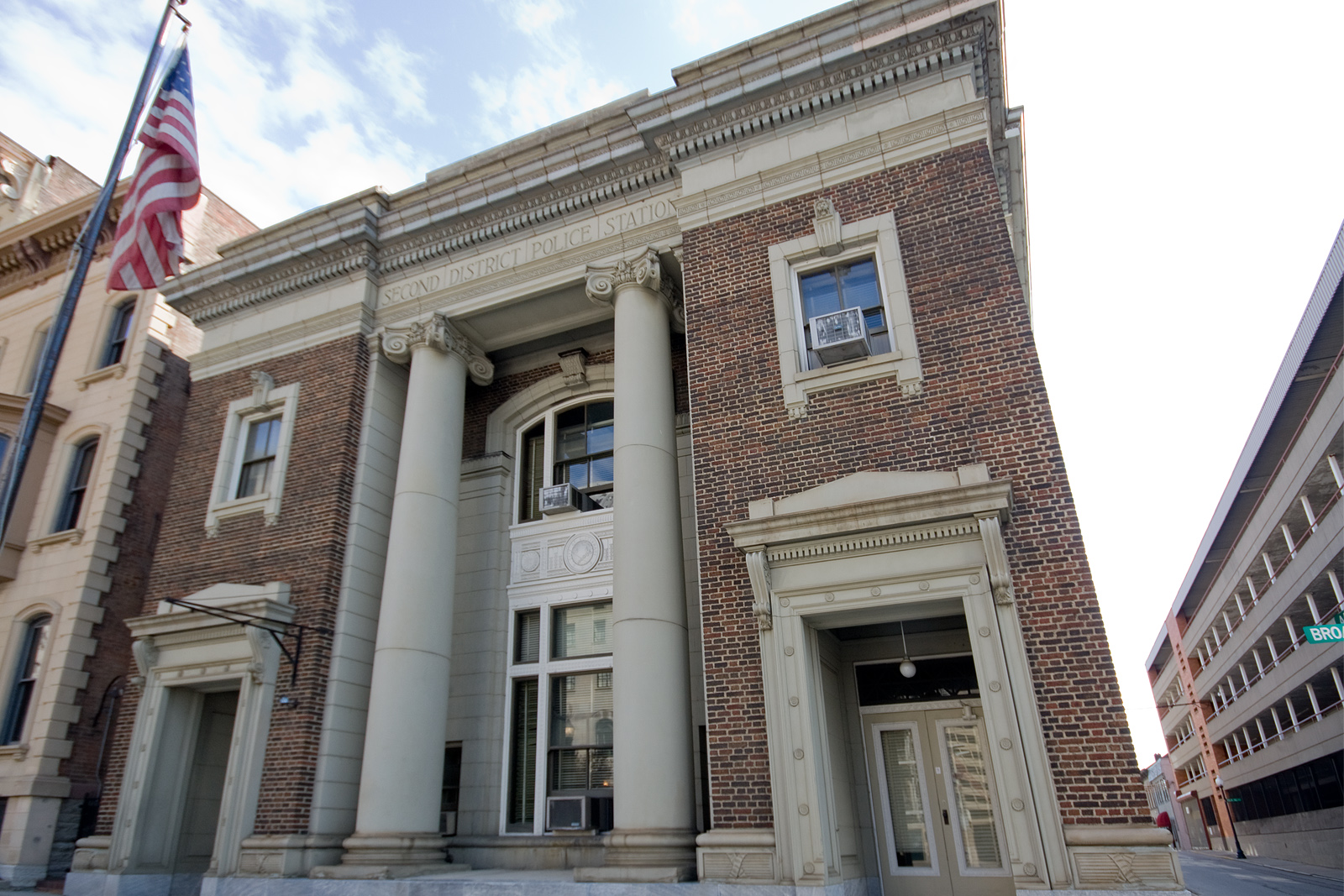
- Location: 314 Broadway Street, Cincinnati, Ohio
- Coordinates: 39°6′1.18″N 84°30′21.47″W
- Architectural style: Classical Revival
- MPS: Patrol Stations in Cincinnati, Ohio TR
- NRHP reference No.: 81000655
- Added to NRHP: May 18, 1981

Police Station No. 2 is a registered historic building in downtown Cincinnati, Ohio, listed in the National Register on May 18, 1981.

Police Station No. 2 is a contributing property to the Lytle Park Historic District.
