= Oasis Rail Transit =

Overview
- Status: Inactive, likely cancelled
- Owner: NS, SORTA
- Locale: Greater Cincinnati
- Stations: 10 (proposed)

Service
- Type: Commuter rail
- Operator: SORTA

Technical
- Line length: 30 miles (proposed)
- Track gauge: 4 ft 8 1/2 in (1,435 mm)

Oasis Rail Transit was a proposed commuter rail line between downtown Cincinnati, Ohio, and Milford, Ohio. Developed by SORTA, Hamilton County and Cincinnati, it was part of the larger Eastern Corridor Program, which focused on improvements to car, bus, bike, and walking transportation, in addition to the proposed rail service, to increase access between Cincinnati's eastern suburbs and the rest of the region.

The route was first identified, alongside other rail routes within Ohio, as part of the Ohio Hub Study commissioned by the Ohio Rail Development Commission subset of the Ohio Department of Transportation between 2004 and 2007.

Oasis Rail Transit was formally proposed in 2010, with a plan that called for using and upgrading existing rail lines and using rail cars powered by diesel multiple unit (DMU) technology.

The rail line was likely cancelled when the Ohio Department of Transportation pulled their funding from the project in 2016. The southern track of the proposed line is currently used for freight rail, with the northern planned to be converted to a pedestrian-bike shared trail.

== Proposed corridor ==
The Oasis line was planned to span 17 miles (27 km), between the Riverfront Transit Center in downtown Cincinnati's The Banks area and east to destinations along a combination of existing and new tracks to its terminus in Milford.

=== Stations ===
Ten stations were originally proposed for the line in the 2006 study. The final proposal for the Oasis line included seven stations:

- Riverfront Transit Center
- Boathouse (East Riverfront)
- Columbia-Tusculum
- Fairfax-Red Bank
- Newtown
- Ancor-Broadwell Rd.
- Milford

The original Pennsylvania Railroad commuter line had stations in Clare, Plainville, and Terrace Park. It previously extended to Morrow.

== Cancellation ==
In February 2016, it was reported that the Ohio Department of Transportation planned to withdraw their funding from the project, based on a memo from January obtained by The Cincinnati Enquirer. The cost of the rail project was quoted as between $337.5 million and $394.6 million.

In 2026, SORTA acquired the full rights northern stretch of rail track between Sawyer Point and Lunken Airport, and plans to convert it to a shared pedestrian and bicycle trail, named the Oasis Trail. The southern railway track will remain in use for freight traffic.

== See also ==
- Cincinnati Subway
- MetroMoves
