= Connector (Cincinnati) =

Streetcar system in Cincinnati, Ohio, U.S.

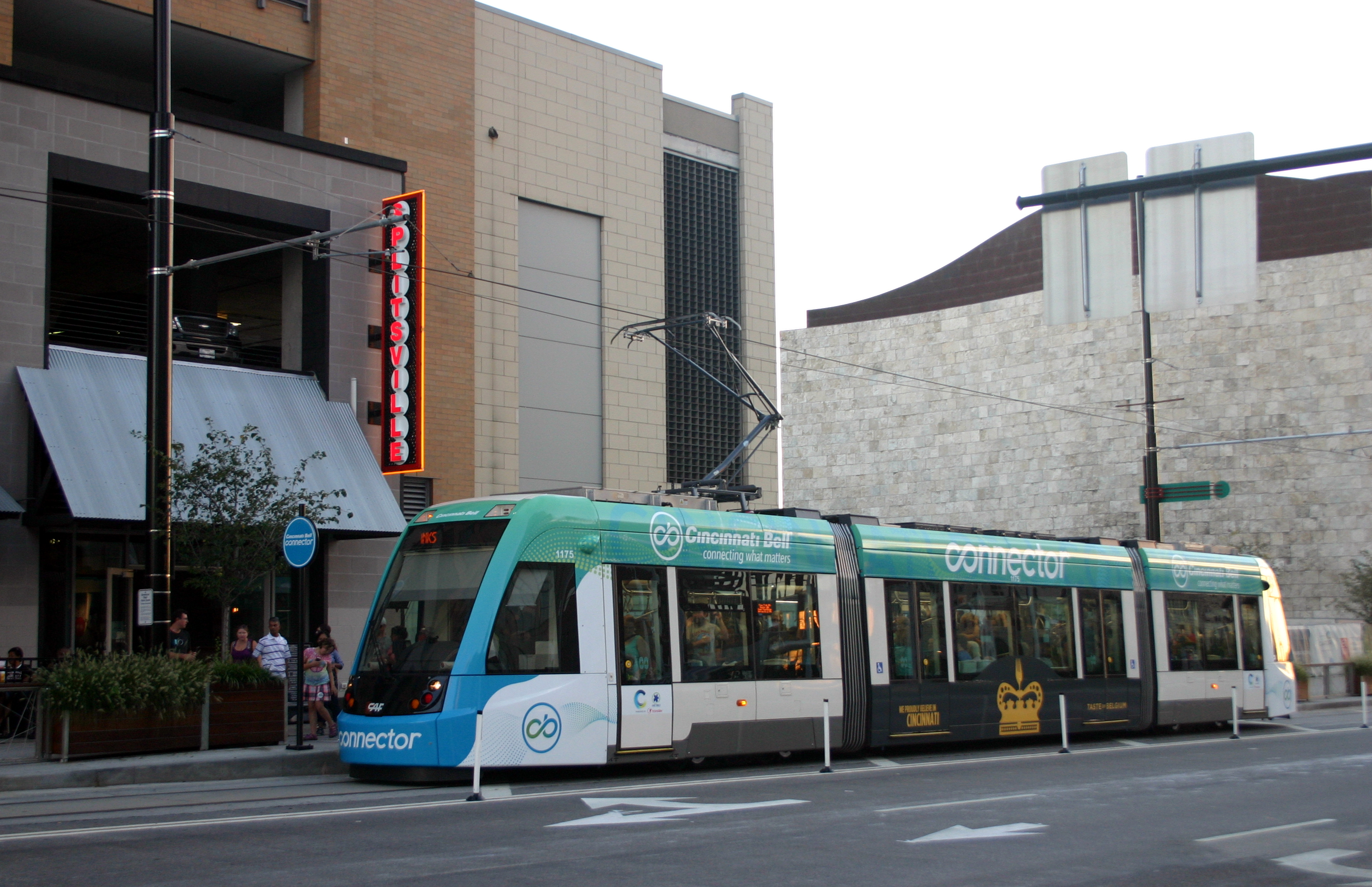
- Connector at The Banks in September 2016

Overview
- Other name(s): Cincinnati Streetcar (planning); Cincinnati Bell Connector (2016–2022)
- Owner: City of Cincinnati
- Line number: 100
- Locale: Cincinnati, Ohio, United States
- Stations: 18
- Website: cincinnati-oh.gov/streetcar/

Service
- Type: Streetcar
- Services: 1
- Operator: Transdev
- Rolling stock: Five CAF Urbos 3
- Daily ridership: 2,734
- Ridership: 943,980 YTD (annual)

History
- Opened: September 9, 2016; 10 years ago

Technical
- Line length: 5.8 km (3.6 mi)
- Character: Street running
- Track gauge: 4 ft 8 1/2 in (1,435 mm) standard gauge
- Electrification: Overhead line, 750 V DC

The Connector is a streetcar system in Cincinnati, Ohio, United States. The system opened to passengers on September 9, 2016. The streetcar operates on a 3.6-mile (5.8 km) loop from The Banks, Great American Ball Park, Paycor Stadium, and Smale Riverfront Park through Downtown Cincinnati and north to Findlay Market in the northern edge of the Over-the-Rhine neighborhood. Future extensions have been proposed to the Uptown area, home to the University of Cincinnati, the regional hospitals on Pill Hill, and the Cincinnati Zoo; and to Northern Kentucky.

Due to the cost, and lack of distance, the project faced opposition on several occasions after being first proposed in 2007. Challenges included ballot initiatives to stop the project in 2009 and 2011, opposition from members of Cincinnati City Council, Governor John Kasich, and Mayor John Cranley (elected in 2013). However, both of the anti-rail ballot initiatives were rejected by voters, and a pro-streetcar majority was elected to City Council in 2011, allowing the project to move forward. Naming rights to the system were purchased by Cincinnati Bell in a $3.4 million, 10-year deal in August 2016. The streetcar was known as the Cincinnati Bell Connector until 2022, when the system gained its current name after the rebranding of Cincinnati Bell to Altafiber.

During the COVID-19 pandemic, fares were suspended and eventually eliminated.

== History ==
=== Context ===
At the end of the 20th century, Over-the-Rhine, which is adjacent to downtown, was one of the most economically distressed areas in the United States. Over-the-Rhine's instability was preventing growth and investment in Downtown Cincinnati, the city's central business district; this, in turn, has been affecting the health of the entire region. Ideally, the streetcar line would attract downtown (and uptown) workers to live near the line, provide economic stimulation and development, and provide transportation for local residents and tourists. The streetcars appeared in Cincinnati's massive 2002 transit plan, MetroMoves, which was rejected when taken to a public vote. A "Phase 1B" was considered that would connect to the "uptown" neighborhoods that surround the University of Cincinnati. The fundamental goal of the streetcar proposal is to create transit-oriented development.

=== Feasibility study ===
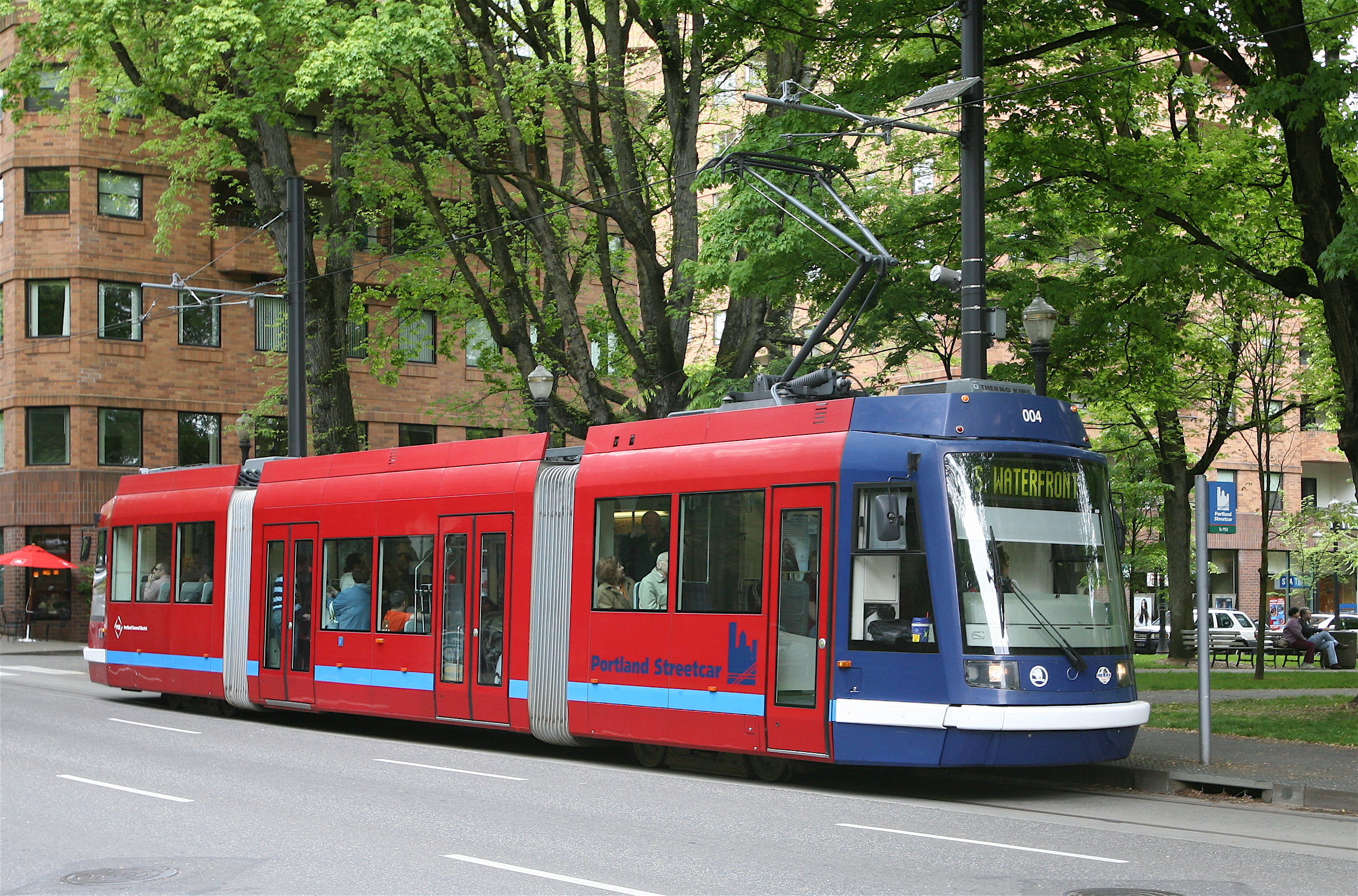
Cincinnati's proposal was modeled after the system in Portland, Oregon

On May 31, 2007, Omaha-based HDR Engineers completed a feasibility study that focused on a 3.9-mile (6.3 km) loop from The Banks, through downtown and Over-the-Rhine. According to the study, the city would gain between 1,200 and 3,400 additional residences, raise an additional $34 million in property taxes, and yield $17 million in retail activity per year from new residents. Within one-quarter mile (0.4 km) of the line there are 97 acres (39 ha) of surface parking lots along the downtown and Over-the-Rhine line. The potential yield of the parking lots for redevelopment is 3,787 housing units or 7,412,900 sq ft (688,680 m^{2}) of commercial/office/hotel space. The study says lots would create between $54 million and $193 million additional redevelopment per year, with a conservative estimate of $112 million per year. A total property value premium of $379 million plus $1,480,000,000 of redevelopment over 10 years (conservative estimate) would equal a total of $1,911,000,000 of benefits for the city. The study estimated the cost to be around $100 million and concluded that the benefit-cost ratio of the downtown and Over-the-Rhine line would be 15.2 to 1, which means for every dollar Cincinnati spends it will receive $15.20 in return. The University of Cincinnati "checked the math" of the study and found that the "projections of the benefits of ridership and economic development" are "credible."

The study projected that a 2010 opening year would draw an estimated 4,600 riders of the downtown and Over-the-Rhine portion of the line each weekday. According to city leaders, if 2 percent of downtown workers, and 2 percent of convention attendees, and 2 percent of Over-the-Rhine residents ride the streetcars it will meet that daily ridership. By 2015 (assuming the system opened in 2010) about 6,400 people were estimated to ride the streetcars per weekday. Ridership numbers for the uptown line were not included in the study.

The 2007 study also claims the streetcar system would have four significant economic effects:

1. Customer base and customer access will expand for existing businesses.
2. Improved market values of existing properties.
3. Catalyst for new transit-oriented development where less parking is required.
4. Supporting neighborhoods by making them more walkable.

=== Votes and political involvement ===
In 2007 the city completed a study to determine if installing streetcars would be beneficial. On April 23, 2008, Cincinnati City Council approved a plan to build a new streetcar line.

In 2009 and 2011 the city voted on referendums designed to stop the streetcar project, but in both cases a majority of voters favored the project.

==== 2009 referendum ====
Special interest groups COAST (Coalition Opposed to Additional Spending and Taxes) and the Cincinnati NAACP both oppose the streetcar system. Both groups gathered signatures for a ballot initiative that would amend the city's charter and force a public vote on the streetcars. However, the amendment would have prohibited the city "from spending any monies for right-of-way acquisition or construction of improvements for passenger rail transportation." This would have affected more than just streetcars, forcing a public vote on any rail-based system including the proposed high-speed rail that connects Cincinnati to Columbus and Cleveland, and potentially even the "Safari Train" at the Cincinnati Zoo. Since the amendment is usually described as a vote on the streetcars, CityBeat has suggested the amendment is "deceptive" and an attempt to reverse "COAST's waning political influence" in the city. (COAST has been described as "rabidly anti-mass transit.") The Cincinnati Enquirer, who wrote that the city is not ready for streetcars, called the proposed amendment a "poison pill" that is "DECEPTIVE in its language and intent."

A political action committee called Cincinnatians for Progress was formed to oppose the amendment proposed by COAST and the NAACP. According to Cincinnatians for Progress, the amendment would unnecessarily delay projects by 10 to 12 months while the city waits on a public vote, and put Cincinnati at a competitive disadvantage with other cities. In the November 3, 2009 local elections however, this city charter amendment proposal failed, losing 56% to 44%.

==== 2011 referendum ====
After losing at the ballot box in 2009, COAST and the local NAACP began collecting signatures in 2011 for a similar ballot initiative. This referendum, known as Issue 48, differed by banning any spending on rail until December 31, 2020, rather than requiring a citywide vote for spending. It would have banned spending, no matter the source of money (federal, state, privately financed, etc.). Critics believed the language of the amendment again applied to all forms of rail transit, including any plans for a streetcar, light rail, or commuter rail.

The Cincinnati Enquirer endorsed a "No" vote on Issue 48, stating, "we vigorously oppose Issue 48 and urge voters to reject it. ... Issue 48 is a bad, bad, bad idea." According to "a majority of legal experts" interviewed by the Enquirer, Issue 48 "is written so broadly it could stop other rail projects in the city." Non-streetcar commuter rail projects that may have been affected included the county-backed Eastern Rail Corridor project, which plans to connect the eastern suburbs to downtown using an abandoned rail line. Others who endorsed a "No" vote were Cincinnati CityBeat, League of Women Voters of the Cincinnati Area, and former leaders of the local NAACP.

Issue 48 was defeated 52% to 48% on November 8, 2011. This, along with Cincinnati electing a more progressive city council, allowed the streetcar project to proceed.

=== Construction begins ===
Construction of the streetcar system began with a groundbreaking on February 17, 2012, and utility relocation began at that time. The contract with Messer/Prus/Delta JV for the construction of the tracks, power system, and a maintenance facility was signed on July 15, 2013.

Former Cincinnati mayor Mark Mallory, a supporter of the streetcars, acknowledged the possibility of reinstalling one or more inclines if the new proposal for streetcars is successful enough. The city still owns the rights-of-way where the inclines once sat.

==== Construction pauses after 2013 election ====
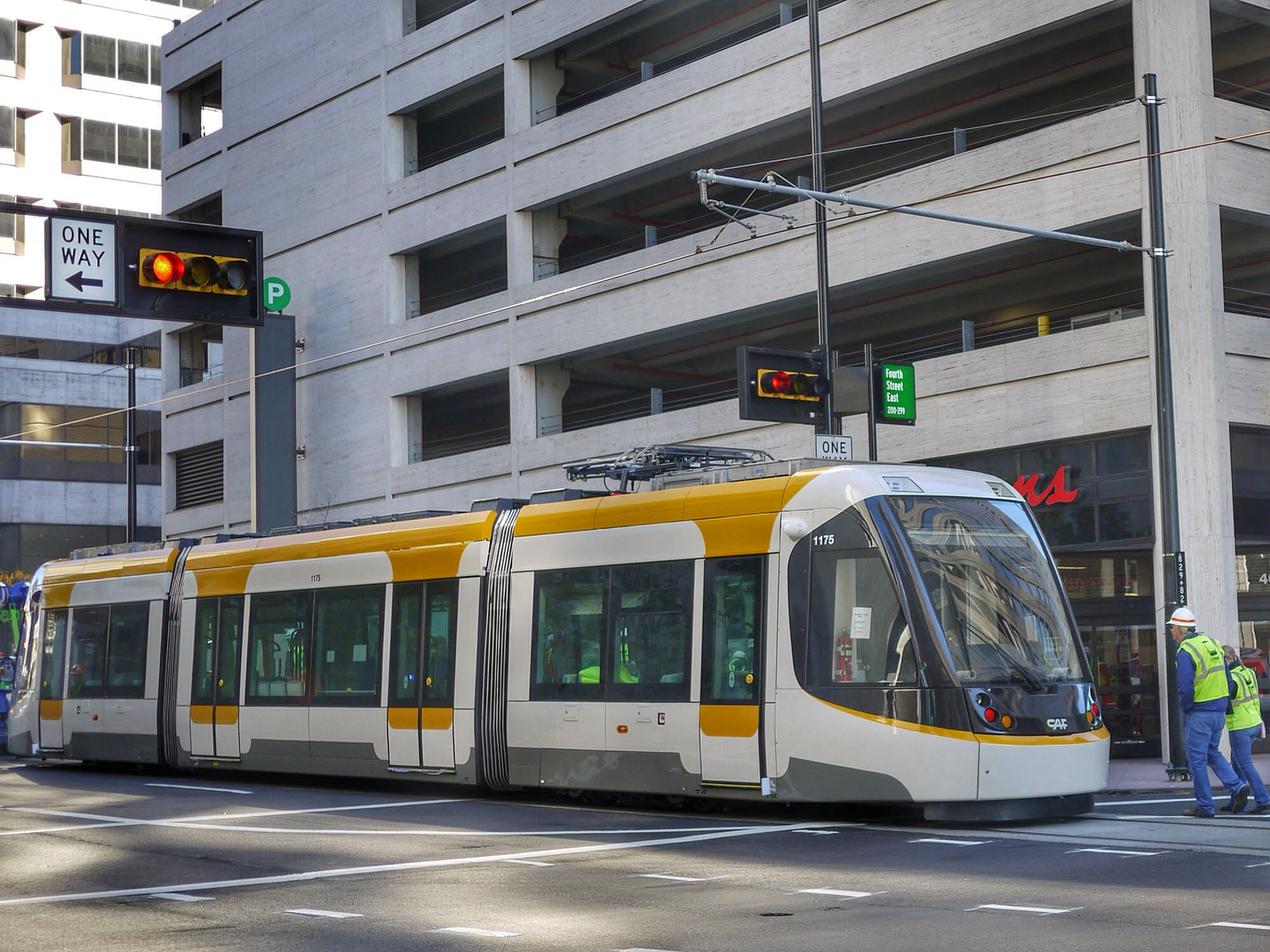
Testing of the first streetcar in November 2015

On November 6, 2013, in a mayoral election to replace Mayor Mallory, who is term-limited, Cincinnati Streetcar supporter Roxanne Qualls was defeated by streetcar opponent John Cranley. In addition, Laure Quinlivan, a council member and streetcar supporter, lost her re-election bid by placing tenth in a race where only the first nine are seated; Amy Murray, a Charter-endorsed Republican who opposed the streetcar, placed ninth. By the time the election was held, contracts had been signed, utility relocation had been ongoing for months, and nearly a half mile of track had been installed on Elm Street. John Deatrick, the Project Executive for the Cincinnati Streetcar, presented numbers to Council showing that it would cost nearly as much to cancel the project as to finish it. Cranley reiterated his intent to cancel the project; however, City Councilman P.G. Sittenfeld, one of the main critics of the streetcar during the election, opposed the cancellation of the project by then. Still, five out of nine members voted to "pause" construction of the streetcar on December 4 to allow for an outside audit of the project.

An independent audit confirmed Dietrich's estimates of the cost of canceling the project. However, Cranley and several council members expressed concern about the annual operating cost of the streetcar and the effect it would have on the city's operating budget. The Southwest Ohio Regional Transit Authority offered to take responsibility for the streetcar's operating cost, but Cranley refused this offer and insisted that financial support must come from the private sector. Finally, after the Haile Foundation committed to providing $9 million in funding towards the project, City Council voted on December 19 to continue construction of the streetcar. Council Members Kevin Flynn and David Mann, who had supported the "pause", joined with four other Council members to vote in favor of the project. Since a supermajority of six Council members voted to resume the project, Cranley was unable to veto the ordinance.

=== Operations ===
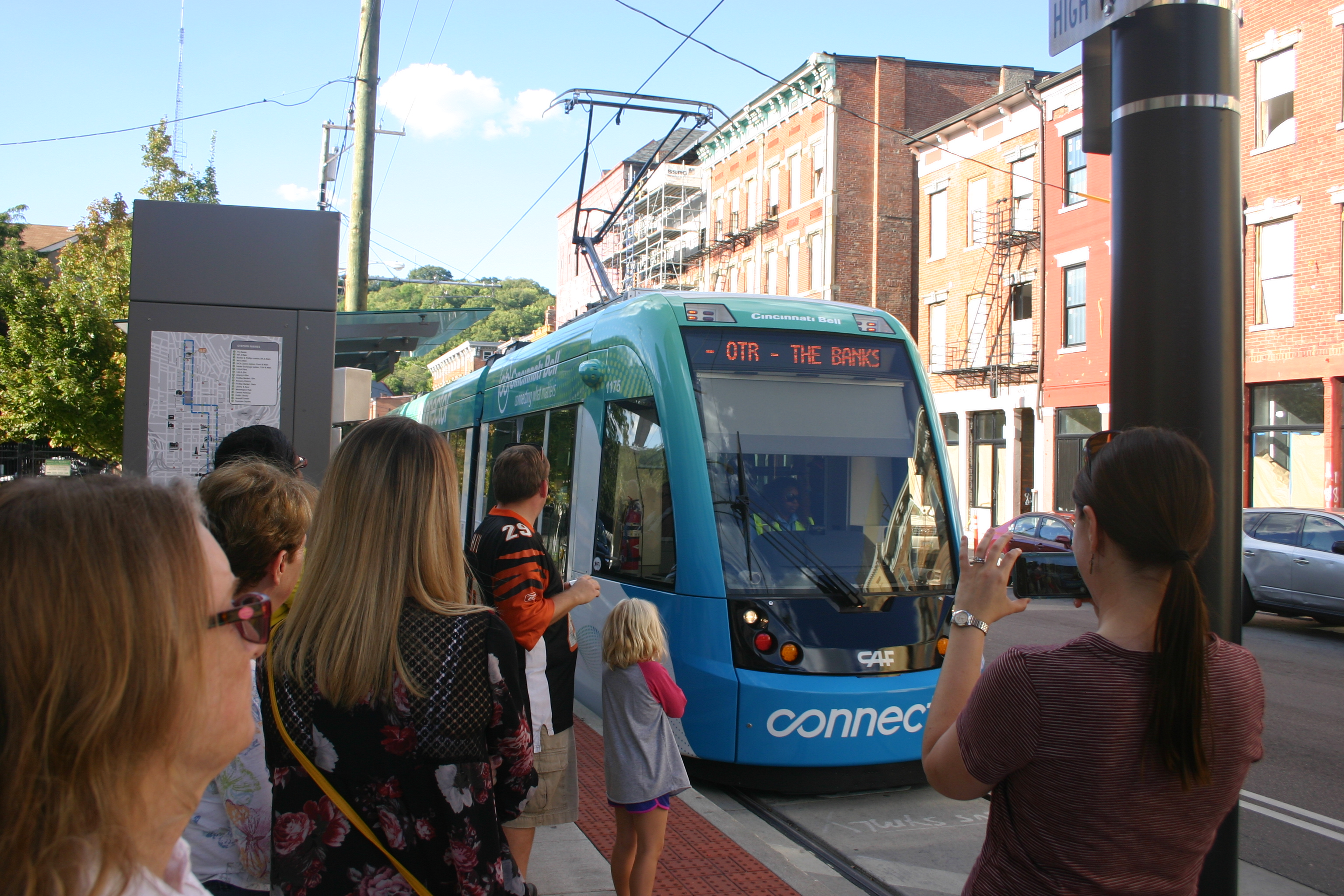
On the system's opening weekend

The system opened to passengers at noon on September 9, 2016. The opening was celebrated with a weekend of free rides. Over 50,000 rides were taken during the three-day opening weekend. It is operated under contract by Transdev.

Following its opening, the streetcar fell short of ridership projections, averaging 2,012 riders per day during its first year. Large events such as the Cincinnati Reds Opening Day draw much larger crowds. Low ridership has been blamed on frequent track blockages by cars that contribute to delays as well as an anti-rail mayoral administration. In August 2018, Cincinnati Bell approached the City of Cincinnati about ending its sponsorship of the system, less than two years into the 10-year contract.

Due to the COVID-19 pandemic, service was suspended at the end of March 30, 2020, and resumed on September 2. The same day, Cincinnati City Council overrode Mayor John Cranley's veto to suspend fares, with the intention of making the streetcar line free of charge permanently. The streetcar line became free of charge permanently beginning November 1. Prior to that change, fare collection had used a proof-of-payment system, with inspectors randomly checking tickets on board.

Beginning in late 2021, ridership began to exceed pre-pandemic levels. For every month from November 2021 through September 2023, the system set record ridership for the respective month, except in the month of June 2022, during which service was suspended for three weeks due to the partial collapse of a nearby building. In 2022, the streetcar set an all-time annual ridership record of 846,622 passengers. The following year, it surpassed that record by more than 30 percent, setting a new all-time annual ridership record of 1,108,092 passengers in 2023. The streetcar set an all-time monthly ridership record of 119,357 passengers in July 2024.

== Route ==
=== List of stops ===
Loop between The Banks and Over-the-Rhine

No.	Station	Connections	Serves
1	The Banks (2nd & Main)	Riverfront Transit Center	Brady Music Center, Freedom Center, Great American Ball Park, Heritage Bank Center, Paycor Stadium
2	4th & Main	Government Square	Cincinnati Bell, Taft Museum of Art
3	6th & Main		Aronoff Center
4	8th & Main		Main Library
5	Court & Main		Hard Rock Casino
6	Hanke Exchange (12th & Main)		Emery Theatre
7	12th & Vine		Art Academy of Cincinnati
8	14th & Elm		Memorial Hall, Music Hall, Shakespeare Company, TQL Stadium, Washington Park
9	Liberty & Elm		
10	Findlay Market – Elm (Elm & Glass Alley)		Findlay Market, Samuel Adams Taproom
11	Brewery District (Elm & Henry)		Brewery District, Rhinegeist
12	Findlay Market – Race (Race & Elder)		Findlay Market, Rookwood Pottery
13	Liberty & Race		Mellotone Beer Project
14	Washington Park (12th & Race)		Washington Park
15	Central Parkway (Central & Vine)		City Hall, Fire Museum, SCPA
16	Public Library (9th & Walnut)		Main Library
17	Aronoff Center (7th & Walnut)		Aronoff Center, Contemporary Arts Center
18	Fountain Square (5th & Walnut)	Government Square	Carew Tower, First Financial Center, Fountain Square

=== Possible extensions ===
The 2007 feasibility study suggested the possibility of several extensions or future additions including a line through Cincinnati's "uptown" neighborhoods to the University of Cincinnati, the Cincinnati Zoo, and to the neighborhood of Clifton. Other potential extensions include a line through the West End to Union Terminal, a line to the East End neighborhood using an abandoned track, and a line across the Taylor-Southgate Bridge to Newport on the Levee in Newport, Kentucky.

==== Uptown Connector ====
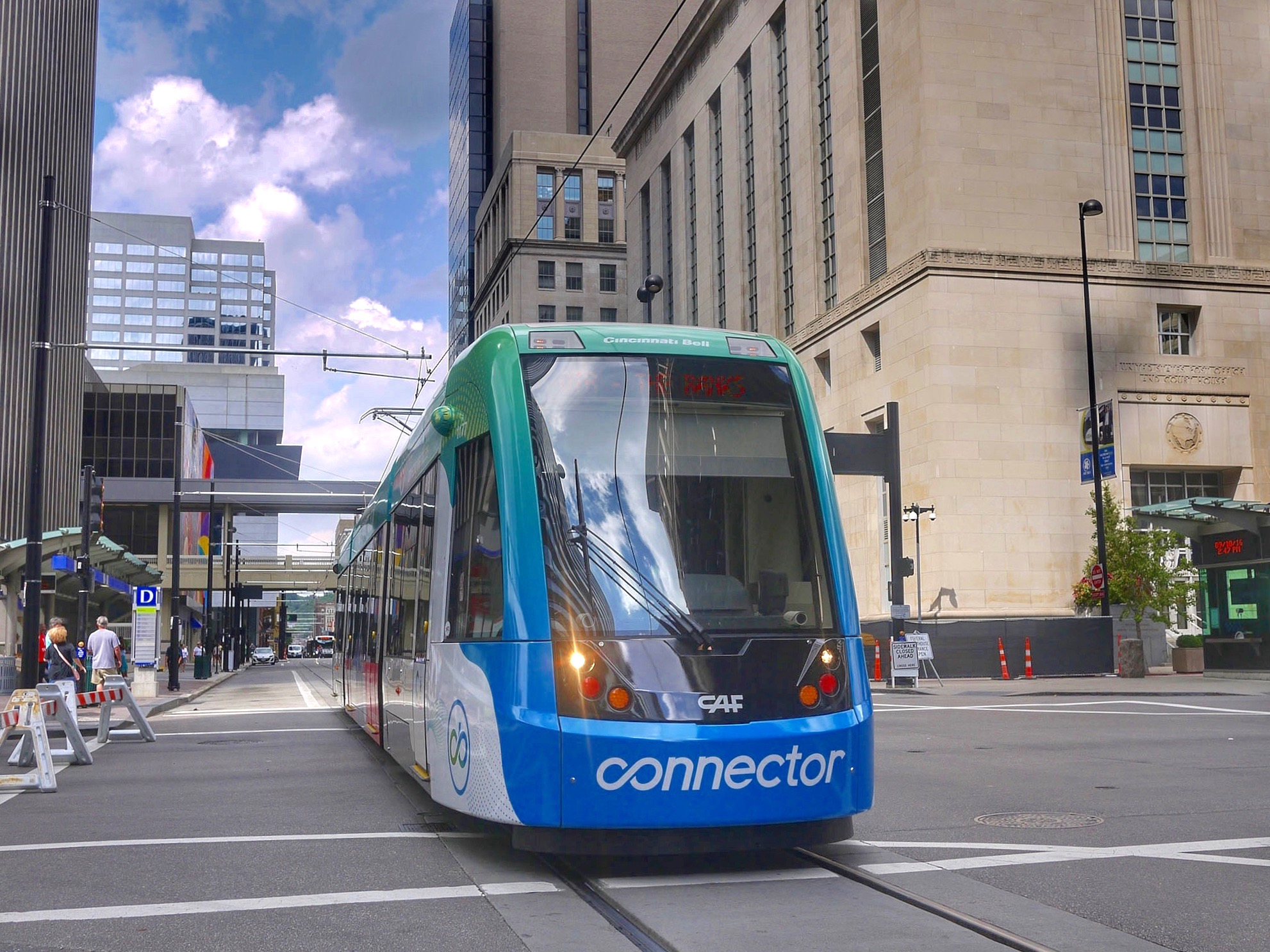
A streetcar in service at 5th and Walnut, in downtown, on the system's opening weekend

On April 23, 2008, Cincinnati City Council voted 6–2 in favor of building the lines that link downtown, Over-the-Rhine, and uptown. Originally, the city wanted to build the line that connects Over-the-Rhine and downtown in the first phase, and then build the uptown link in a second phase. However, a council majority wanted to include the Uptown Connector in the first phase. Soon after taking office in 2011, the anti-rail Republican, Governor John Kasich, pulled all $52 million in state money for the streetcar project, and plans for the Uptown route were scrapped as a result.

Both Vine Street and West Clifton Avenue were studied as options for the Phase 1B connection from Over-the-Rhine to Uptown. Vine Street was a path for the original streetcars, but an "extreme hillside" to the west of the street and a city park and an elementary school to the east leaves less land for development when compared to West Clifton Avenue. West Clifton Avenue passes through Clifton Heights, which is one of the densest neighborhoods in the city due to its concentration of UC students. Studies considered whether or not West Clifton Avenue is too steep for streetcar travel, and which path could tap into more federal funding. Ultimately, Vine Street was chosen as the route for the original Uptown Connector.

The lack of political will to advance plans for an extension has given advocates more time to study and reconsider the best way to take the streetcar to Uptown. In 2014, as the Vine Street route was further explored, the "Clifton Shortcut" was proposed as a more direct route to turn up Vine Street. However, after further study it still suffered from many of the same issues as the originally proposed Vine Street route with major underground utility lines, narrow lanes with greater risk of accidents, and uncomfortable grades, which limit level boarding platforms for stops and hence economic development opportunities in the hillside areas.

In 2015, an alternative plan of using two tunnels to get to Uptown has also been proposed. It includes extensions from Phase 1A northward up Main and Walnut to a southern tunnel portal under Mulberry Street at Main that daylights at-grade near Inwood Park for a station servicing Christ Hospital before returning underground until aligning with Jefferson Avenue near Daniels. Past studies have shown that Mount Auburn has suitable geology that is conducive to building a $100 million tunnel that would connect downtown to Clifton, however further study is needed to know the exact cost to implement this new plan. The additional cost of tunneling is believed to be justified in order to increase reliability and speed at the center of a regional light rail system that could be developed around this spine in the future through projects such as Wasson Way.

==== Newport extension ====
In 2009, the cities of Newport, Kentucky, and Covington, Kentucky, across the Ohio River officially supported Cincinnati's streetcar proposal, and would like to install a system that links with the Cincinnati system. A group called the Northern Kentucky Streetcar Committee is exploring ways to get a study funded to extend the route across the Taylor Southgate Bridge and into Newport.

== Cost and funding ==
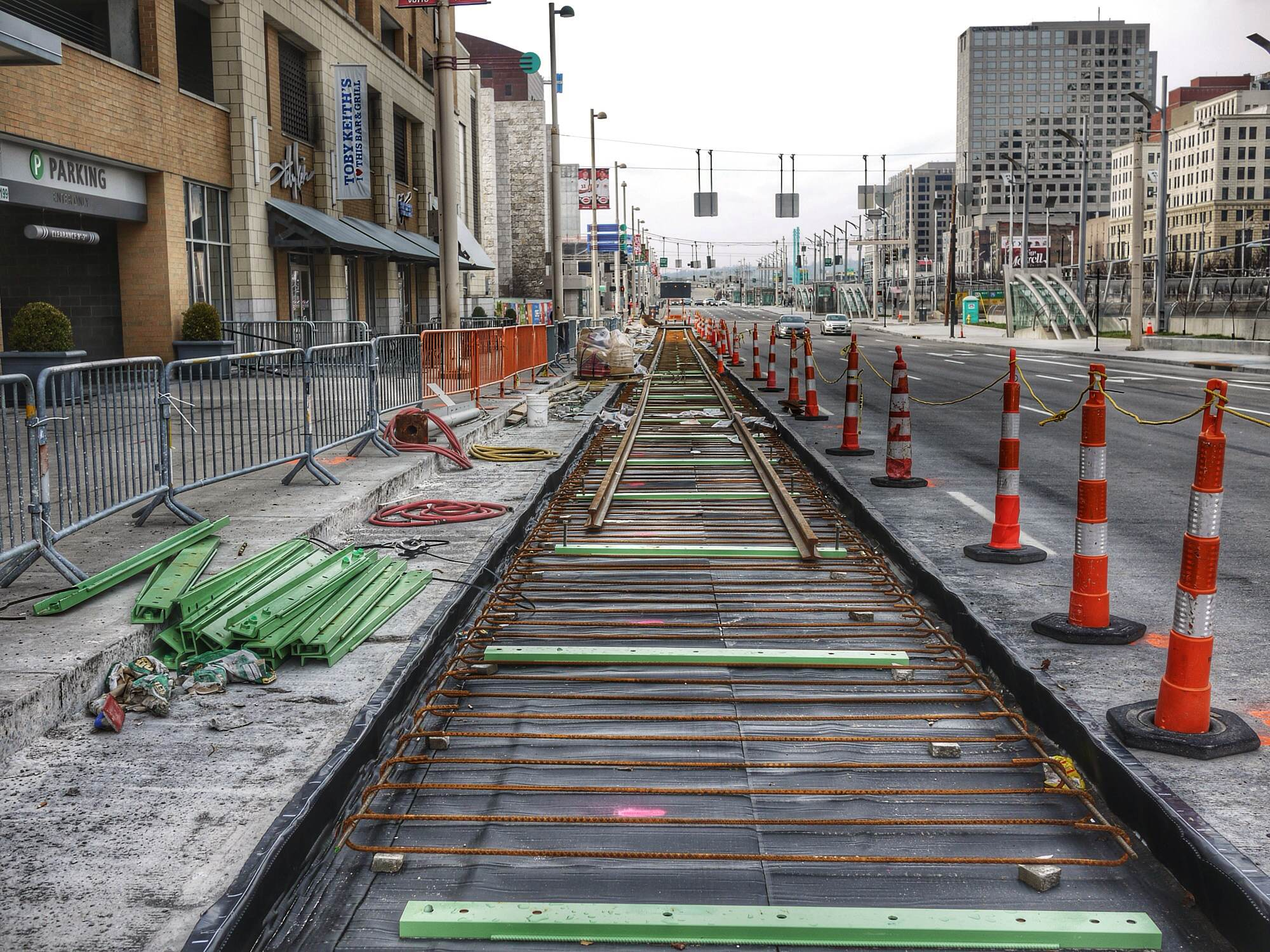
Construction in December 2014

The Downtown/Over-the-Rhine line would cost $102 million. A Downtown/Over-the-Rhine/University of Cincinnati line would cost $128 million. The full Downtown/Over-the-Rhine/University of Cincinnati/Uptown/Zoo line would cost $185 million. The cost estimate for the Downtown/Over-the-Rhine line includes approximately 4.5 miles (7.2 km) of track and overhead power supply (for the route and storage/maintenance), 6 streetcars, 18 streetcar stops, a maintenance/storage facility for the streetcars, as well as a 15% to 25% contingency on project line items.

The money to fund the $102 million Downtown/Over-the-Rhine line would be attained from a variety of sources. Of those, $25 million would come from capital bonds; $25 million from tax increment financing from downtown property taxes; $31 million from private contributors, partners and sponsors; $11 million from proceeds from the sale of the Blue Ash Airport; and $10 million from state grants. The remaining $80 million to $85 million for the full Uptown system was planned to be built later, mostly with federal funds. However, after city council approved the streetcar plan they decided to look for an additional $35 million to "get up the hill" to the University of Cincinnati. (Engineering and construction costs for the uphill portion of the line would cost more than the portion of the line built on flat land.) The $35 million would only take the streetcars up to the university, that money would not extend it to the Cincinnati Zoo.

Annual operating costs were estimated between $2.0 and $2.7 million per year for the Downtown/Over-the-Rhine line. The estimate includes labor for streetcar operators, for maintenance of the streetcars, track and other facilities, and for ongoing management and administration of the service. A portion of the cost would be covered by a fare, if there is one. The fare policy has not been decided and could cost anywhere from "the current local bus fare" ($1.50 as of 2009) to free. According to City Council member Chris Bortz, the remaining operating cost could be covered by a variety of means, the most likely being revenue from advertisements inside and/or outside the streetcar—similar to how ads are done with Cincinnati's bus system.

Due to the severe economic downturn of 2008 and 2009 the city has had trouble raising the full $35 million needed from private sources. (Duke Energy has promised to donate $3.5 million.) City officials have made several trips to Washington to lobby for federal money for the streetcar system.

In May 2010, the city had raised over $90 million in funds, and expected federal grants in the summer of 2010 to cover the remaining cost.

- $15 million from Ohio Transportation Review Advisory Council (TRAC)
- $64 million in bonds by the City of Cincinnati
- $2.6 million in local funds
- $15 million from the Ohio Department of Transportation
- $4 million from the Ohio-Kentucky-Indiana Regional Council of Governments
- $25 million from the United States Department of Transportation's Urban Circulator Grant Program

After the Ohio Transportation Review Advisory Council (TRAC) pulled its portion of funding for the project, the city postponed the Uptown Connector and moved forward with a slightly shortened Downtown/Over-the-Rhine route. After receiving an additional Urban Circulator grant from the United States Department of Transportation, the route was extended to reach Henry Street to the north and 2nd Street to the south.

In 2011 Governor John Kasich took away $52 million in state money that had been awarded to the streetcar by the previous administration. Despite being the Ohio Department of Transportation's top rated project, the money was redirected to projects in other areas of the state. In 2012, Congressman Steve Chabot added an amendment to the annual transportation spending bill that prohibits any federal money going to the streetcar.

The final budget upon project completion in 2016 was $148 million.

=== Possible benefits and drawbacks ===
There may be some benefits associated with building the streetcar system. The projections of the 2007 streetcar study indicated that the streetcars would have a 14:1 benefit-cost ratio over the next decade. In addition, Downtown and Over-the-Rhine has 97 acres (39 ha) of surface parking lots within 0.25 miles (0.4 km) of the line, which is a lot of potential development. Much of the recent investment in the Over-the-Rhine neighborhood is based on the belief that the system will be built. Rookwood Pottery moved from Glendora Avenue in Corryville to Race Street in Over-the-Rhine, near Findlay Market, so that it would be on the streetcar line. Forty-six cities either have streetcars, or are trying to develop them. For instance, Portland, Oregon, spent $57 million to build its streetcar system and recouped $1.6 billion in investment, so by the same projection, the investment in Cincinnati would yield nearly $3 billion in development.

However, opponents say that a streetcar may not be as effective, or effective at all, at economic development in Cincinnati as streetcars seem to have been in certain other cities. That is, economic development is contextual and historically contingent. The NAACP, for example, has suggested improving existing utilities and economic sectors rather than building the streetcar system. In addition, the streetcar is designed to be symbolic transit, rather than being planned as an essentially functional part of the transit system—or to serve primarily as transportation as such—because Over-the-Rhine is already developing very rapidly without the streetcar. Other opponents say that the streetcar serves as a political cover for the easing of development restrictions and that much or all development will be due to the easing of restrictions that would have otherwise been left in place, rather than a streetcar itself.

== Rolling stock ==
Five low-floor CAF Urbos 3 streetcars were ordered from Construcciones y Auxiliar de Ferrocarriles (CAF) of Beasain, Spain, with an original delivery date of July 2014. The first streetcar vehicle arrived on October 30, 2015.

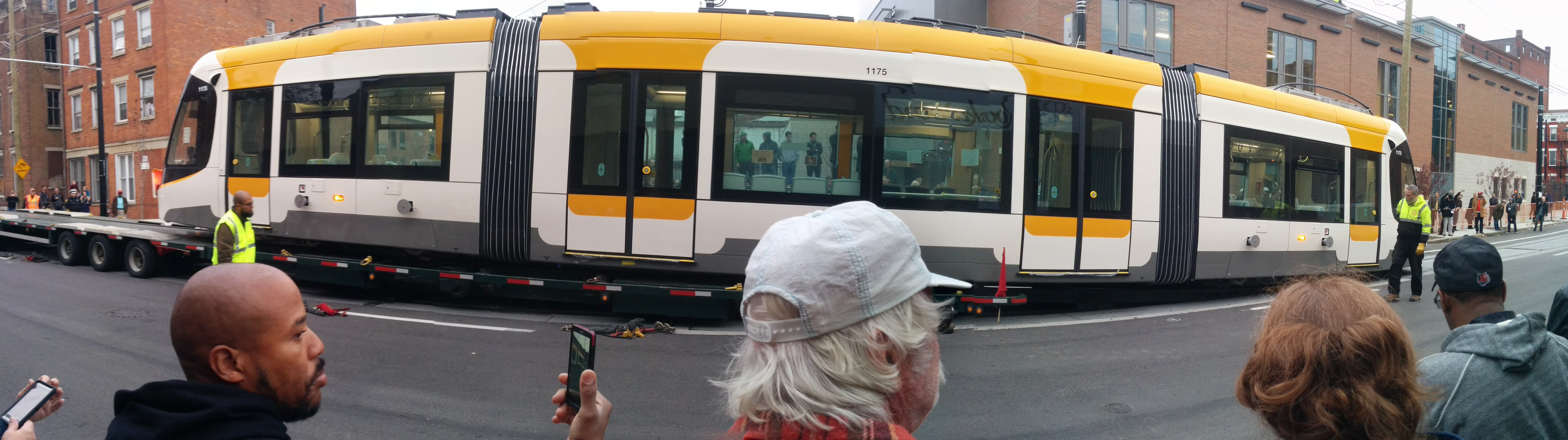
Streetcar number 1175 being unloaded on to the rails

== Ridership ==
Italics indicate each month's ridership record.

Month	2016	2017	2018	2019	2020	2021	2022	2023	2024	2025	2026
January	N/A	35,334	16,943	22,079	26,385	21,214	43,131	71,363	67,686	58,505	50,763
February	N/A	36,681	22,465	23,759	28,295	21,046	49,641	71,183	73,461	65,697	68,510
March	N/A	34,679	37,471	35,484	17,837	33,764	58,874	80,215	101,017	93,506	91,271
April	N/A	49,966	36,998	36,035	60	40,933	65,352	90,165	103,565	82,719	93,572
May	N/A	53,116	51,110	46,931	53	51,430	81,175	102,189	114,296	106,403	104,394
June	N/A	61,404	50,326	51,534	48	44,077	49,627	105,624	111,630	116,576	109,916
July	N/A	60,749	57,682	58,392	96	59,173	89,074	111,320	119,357	114,256	111,745
August	N/A	52,028	47,363	56,402	317	55,405	83,078	101,988	119,072	115,678	106,899
September	75,485	57,214	43,501	51,554	21,253	62,136	88,992	115,114	104,739	109,433	105,199
October	82,934	63,150	37,732	76,752	24,607	59,161	103,700	87,427	119,146	100,176	
November	49,920	34,517	33,706	32,742	23,054	52,440	64,675	82,509	80,130	79,605	
December	52,209	32,583	38,387	38,352	24,337	55,105	69,303	88,995	84,760	80,670	
Totals	260,548	571,421	473,684	530,016	166,342	555,884	846,622	1,108,092	1,198,859	1,123,224	

== Commemorative beers ==
On October 23, 2015, Brad Thomas, a member of the Southwest Ohio Regional Transit Authority, announced that the five different brewers that line the streetcars route had each agreed to brew a new specialty beer to honor the delivery of the first five vehicles.

Commemorative beers
Vehicle number	Delivery date	Commemorative beer
1175	October 30, 2015	"Ryed the Rails" by Taft's Ale House
1176	November 23, 2015	"Desire" by Christian Moerlein Lager House
1177	December 11, 2015	"Traction" by Rhinegeist
1178	January 7, 2016	Christian Moerlein Tap Room
1179	February 5, 2016	"1179 Marzen" Rock Bottom Brewery

== See also ==
- Cincinnati Street Railway, a predecessor
- Light rail in the United States
- Streetcars in North America
- List of streetcar systems in the United States (all-time list)
- List of tram and light rail transit systems (worldwide)
- List of rail transit systems in the United States (currently operating systems only, and including other rail modes)
