= Cincinnati Food + Wine Classic =

Culinary festival in Ohio, U.S.

- Genre: Culinary festival
- Venue: Washington Park (Cincinnati, Ohio)
- Location: Over-The-Rhine
- Inaugurated: 2014
- Founder: Donna Covrett, Courtney Tsitouris
- Attendance: 2000 (2014)

The Cincinnati Food + Wine Classic is an annual culinary festival in the Over-the-Rhine historic district of Cincinnati, Ohio. The event was first produced in 2014 and draws presenters and attendees from throughout the midwest and the nation.

== History ==
The Food + Wine Classic was first held in 2014 as a two-day event at Washington Park in the Over-the-Rhine historic district and expanded to three days for the 2015 event. Former Cincinnati Magazine dining editor Donna Covrett and local food writer Courtney Tsitouris developed the Classic to "showcase local and regional talent" and to "celebrate (the city's) Porkopolis heritage." More than 80 chefs participated in 2014 and over 100 in 2015.

== Program ==
The event includes competitions, tastings, demonstrations, workshops, book signings, and classes offered by chefs, sommeliers, mixologists, winemakers, brewers, distillers, and food writers. The event kicks off each year with "Pork Chopped," a competition among chefs to create the best dish using "the meat that made Cincinnati famous."

== Attendance ==
The Food + Wine Classic draws chefs and food writers from throughout the midwest and across the country. The 2014 inaugural event "exceeded expectations," drawing more than 2,000 attendees who had paid ticket prices of $100 - $400 for "festival-style" (or all-inclusive) access to food and beverage offerings, and resulting in the event running out of food.

== Reception ==
The event "attracted an overflow crowd" in 2014. Olivia Barrow, writing in Independent Restaurateur in July 2015, called it "(a culinary event) many chefs and restaurateurs are looking forward to, even though it's relatively new." Food Network's Nathan Lyon called it "an exceptional showcase of the region’s culinary talent in addition to the all-star line up of chefs from around the country."
