= St. Paulus Kirche, Cincinnati =

Church building in Cincinnati, Ohio

Coordinates: 39°06′41″N 84°31′03″W

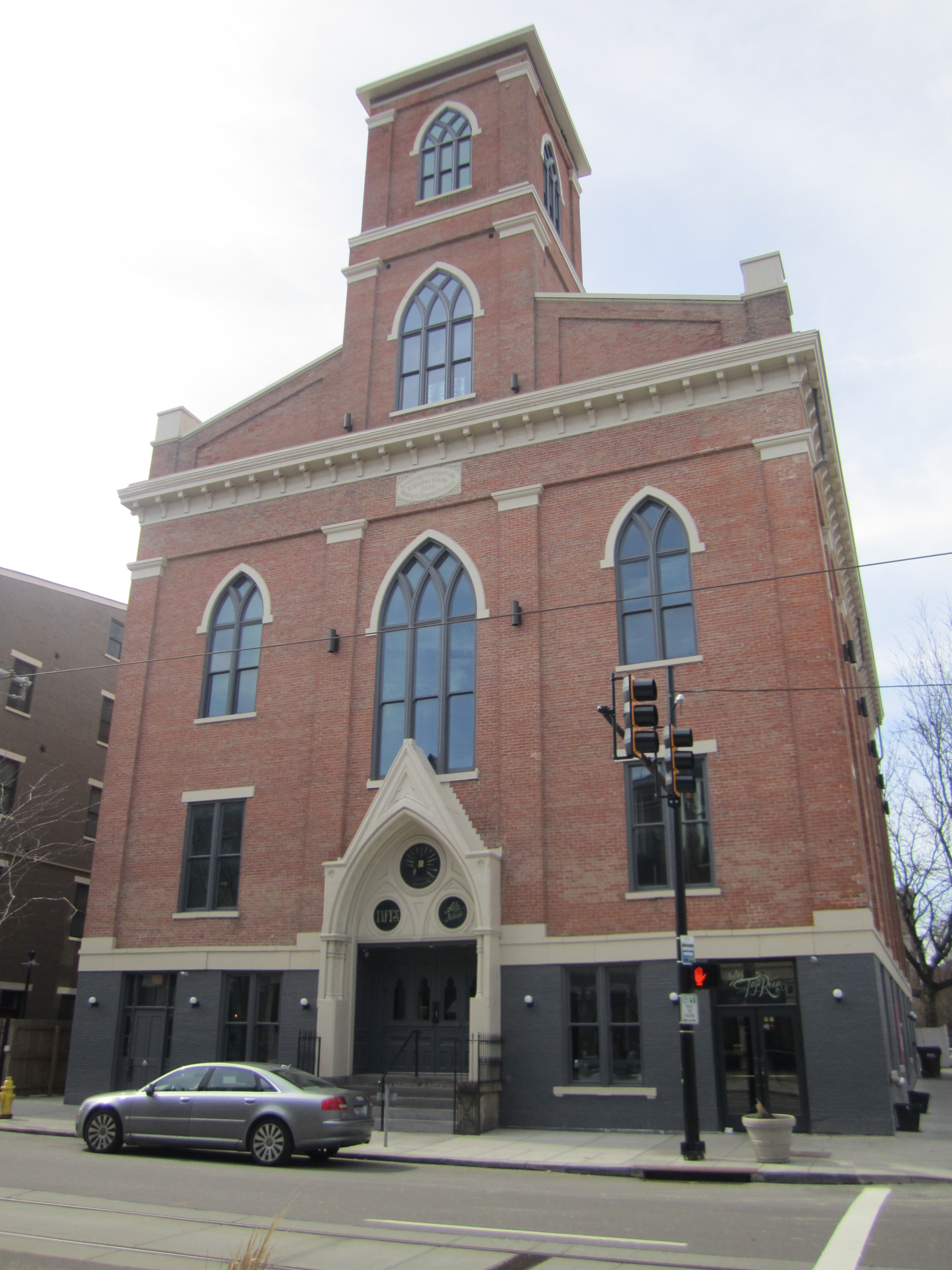
The church building in 2016

St. Paulus Kirche is a former German Evangelical Protestant church located at the corner of 15th and Race Streets in the Over-the-Rhine historic district of Cincinnati, Ohio. It is one block from the headquarters of 3CDC which are located in Saengerhalle. Built in 1850, it is the oldest surviving Protestant church in the city and the second oldest church in Cincinnati. After sitting vacant for several decades, the building reopened as a brewpub in 2015.

== History ==
St. Paul's was formed in 1845 as a breakaway from another German Protestant church, St. John's. Immigrants from northern Germany, who spoke Low German, felt marginalized by those from southern Germany, who spoke Swabian. The brick Greek Revival building opened in 1850, sporting a drugstore on the corner to help pay the mortgage. In 1950, the congregation merged with St. Peter's and moved to Westwood to form St. Peter and Paul United Church of Christ. The property was then used by a succession of other congregations until title reverted to the city. The building was vacant after 1993.

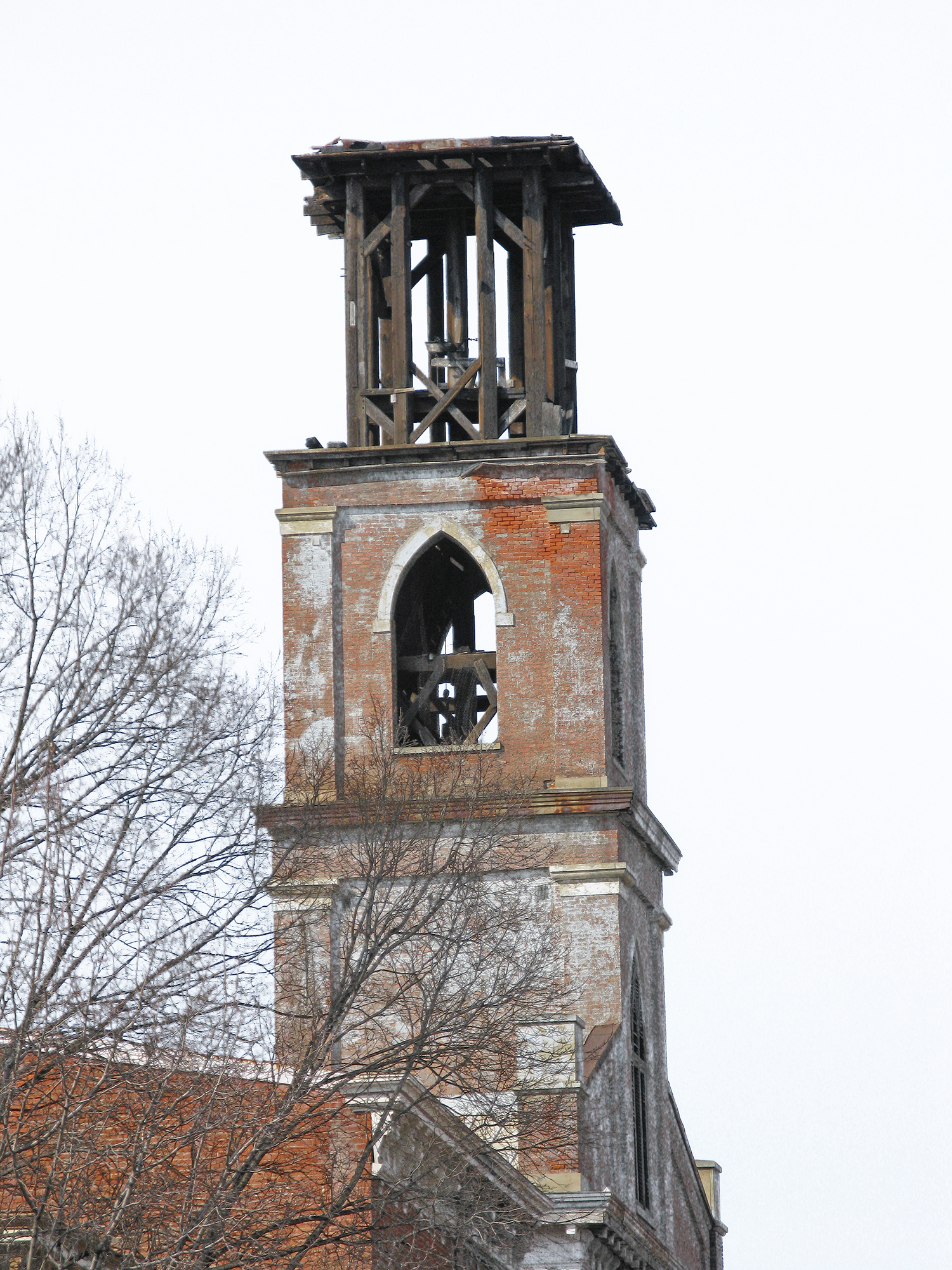
The damaged wooden steeple prior to repairs

The church steadily deteriorated, and its historic wooden steeple was destroyed by a severe storm in September 2008. In February 2011, the city of Cincinnati and 3CDC began work to stabilize the structure. According to the March 1, 2011 feature story in Soapbox Cincinnati, "Divine Inspiration: New Uses for Old Churches":

"Work on the church is proceeding from the outside utilizing multi-story cranes to peel the roof back to survey the damage and remediate the structural issues. Munitz estimates it will cost $600,000-750,000 to make it secure and safe - the city of Cincinnati is contributing $300,000 towards stabilization."

=== Renovation as brewpub ===
In 2011, Cincinnati-based HGC Construction company stabilized the historic structure in 2011, readying it for development. In the summer of 2014, construction began to re-purpose the church into Taft's Ale House, a brewery and restaurant. The three-level brewpub was themed after William Howard Taft and features a blend of industrial and Victorian design. The space included two bars, a large beer hall with communal tables, traditional dining space as well as private dining in the bell tower. Taft's Ale House opened on April 6, 2015.

Taft's Ale House closed in November 2023, with its owners citing the COVID-19 pandemic, rising costs and decreasing revenue as reasons for the closure. In August 2024, 3CDC announced that the next tenant of the building would be a new brewpub, the Mellotone Beer Project. The new venture held its grand opening on November 22 of that year. Mellotone includes an American cuisine restaurant on the main floor, and a bar called Undertone on the lower level.
