= Saengerhalle =

Sangerhalle (German: Sängerhalle "Singers' Hall") is a historic building in the Over-the-Rhine historic district of Cincinnati, Ohio situated at the corner of 14th and Race Streets across from Washington Park and Cincinnati Music Hall.

The public-private redevelopment corporation 3CDC has its headquarters in Saengerhalle.
