= Riverfront Transit Center =

Transit center in Cincinnati, US

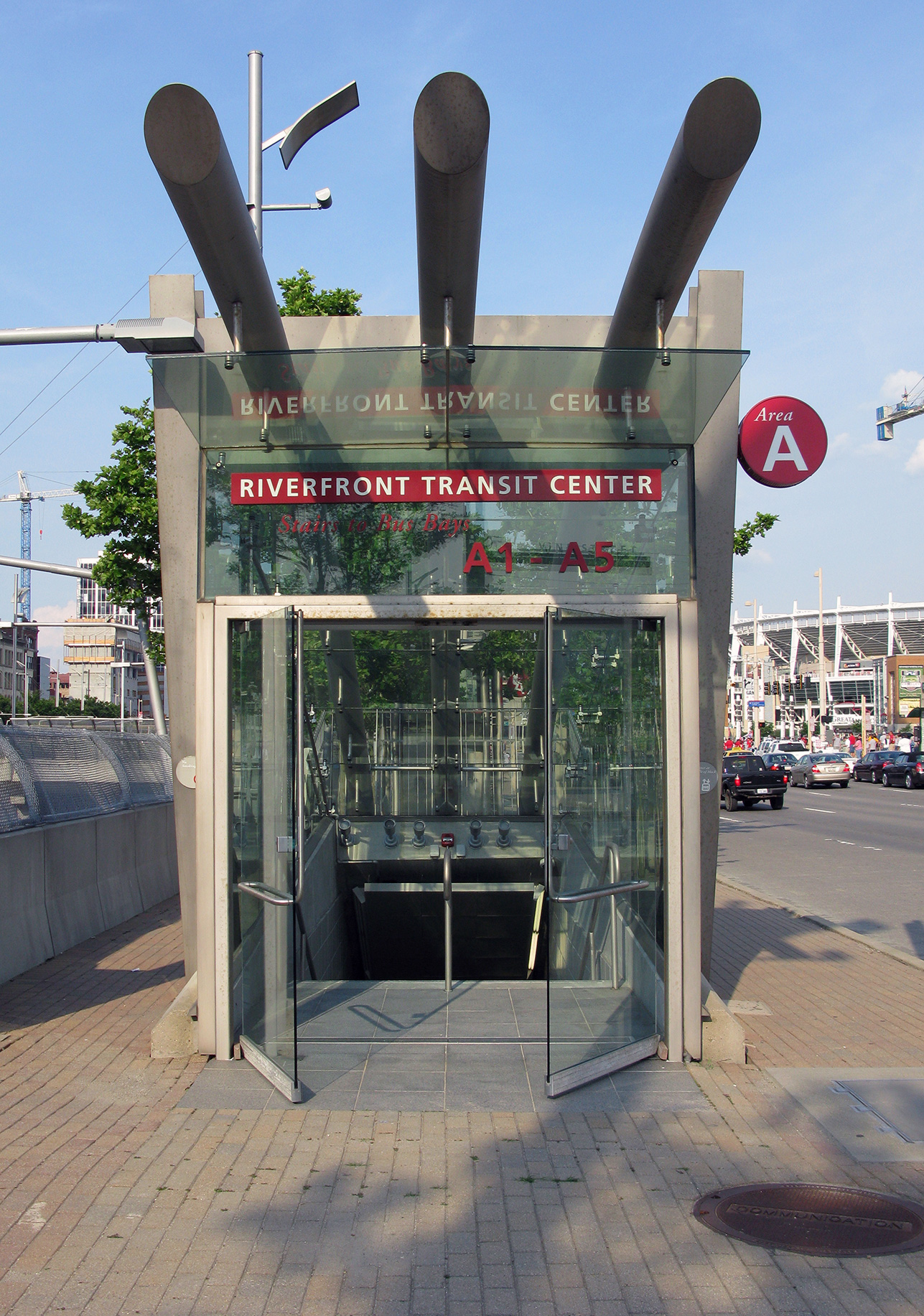
- Street level entrance to the Transit Center

General information
- Coordinates: 39°05′53″N 84°30′41″W
- Owner: City of Cincinnati
- Platforms: Side platform
- Connections: Connector at The Banks

Construction
- Parking: Yes (2011)
- Accessible: Yes

History
- Opened: 2002
Location

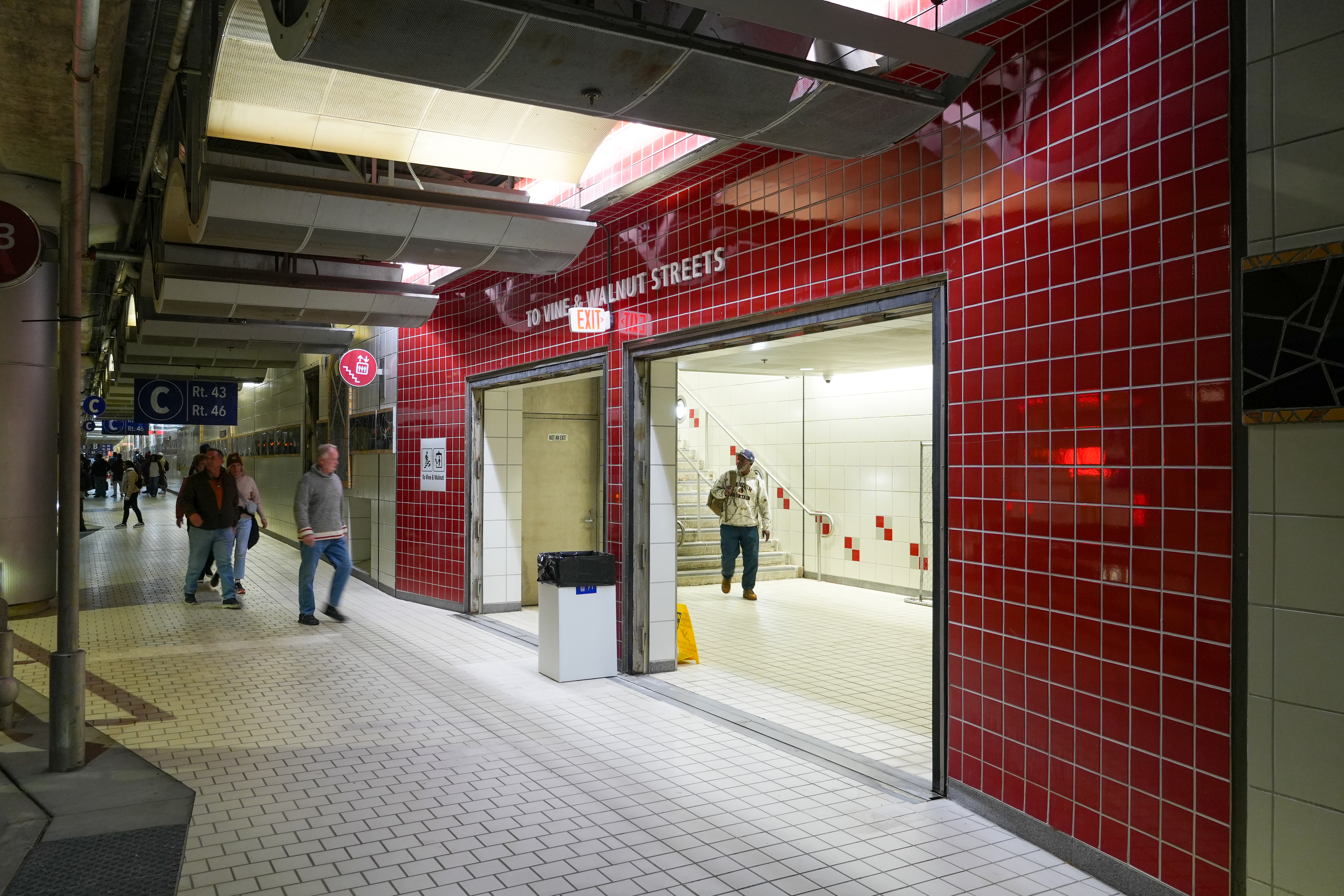
Photo of the transit center in use during Blink Cincinnati 2024.

The Riverfront Transit Center is a multi-modal transportation center in the city of Cincinnati, Ohio, near Great American Ball Park and The Banks. Aside from its regular use as a terminus of the Metro*Plus bus route, it is used as a local and commuter bus hub for TANK and SORTA during special events at The Banks. It runs alongside the Fort Washington Way freeway trench. The center was completed in 2003 and has the capacity to handle up to 500 buses and 20,000 people per hour, for use during sporting or other special events.

== History ==
The Riverfront Transit Center was constructed as part of the reconstruction of Fort Washington Way, which began in July 1998. The transit center itself was completed and first used for Cincinnati Riverfest in September 2002, with an official opening ceremony following in 2003. The total cost for the transit center was estimated at $18 million. It features an 800 foot long mosaic mural called “Daily Icons” by local artist Chad Scholten, and a bronze of William DeHart Hubbard, a Cincinnati native who was the first African-American to win an individual Olympic gold medal.

=== Oasis rail ===
The Riverfront Transit Center was also proposed to serve as the downtown terminal station for the planned Oasis Rail Transit connecting Cincinnati to Milford. The rail project was cancelled when the Ohio Department of Transportation removed its funding for the project in a memo circulated in January 2016.

== Current and planned service ==
The Riverfront Transit Center is currently used by one SORTA route, Metro Plus. It is supplementally used for charter bus parking during Reds and Bengals games, commuter parking, and for diverted TANK and SORTA bus routes when Government Square has been closed for the BLINK festival. It is also planned to be used for the upcoming bus rapid transit service, called "Metro Rapid."

== See also ==
- Cincinnati Subway, a set of partially completed, derelict tunnels and stations for a rapid transit system beneath the streets of Cincinnati, Ohio.
