= The Banks, Cincinnati =

Coordinates: 39°5′48″N 84°30′42″W

The Banks
- Interactive map of the The Banks area

General information
- Type: Mixed-use commercial, entertainment, retail, office
- Location: Cincinnati, Ohio, United States
- Groundbreaking: April 2, 2008
- Opening: Spring 2011

Design and construction
- Developer: Carter; The Dawson Co.

The Banks is a mixed-use development along the Ohio River in downtown Cincinnati, Ohio, on the land between Paycor Stadium and Great American Ball Park.

== History ==
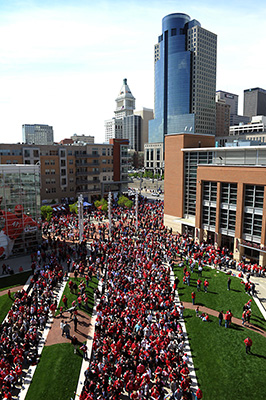
The Banks on Opening Day 2012

The construction for a new riverfront area between the two stadiums is the result of a public participation planning process begun in October 1996. Hamilton County and the City of Cincinnati engaged Urban Design Associates to prepare a plan to give direction in two public policy areas:

1. To site the two new stadiums for the Cincinnati Reds and the Cincinnati Bengals
2. To develop an overall urban design framework for the development of the central riverfront which would capitalize on the major public investment in the stadiums and structured parking.

A Riverfront Steering Committee made up of City and County elected officials and staff was formed as a joint policy board for the Central Riverfront Plan. Focus groups, interviews, and public meetings were held throughout the planning process.

A Concept Plan was published in April 1997 which identified three possible scenarios for the siting of the stadiums and the development of the riverfront. The preparation of a final Master Plan was delayed due to a November 1998 public referendum on the siting of the Reds Stadium. Once the decision on the Reds Stadium was made by the voters in favor of a riverfront site, Hamilton County and the City of Cincinnati appointed sixteen prominent citizens to the Riverfront Advisors Commission who were charged to "recommend mixed usage for the Riverfront that guarantees public investment will create sustainable development on the site most valued by our community". The result of that effort was The Banks, a September 1999 report from the Advisors which contained recommendations on land use, parking, finance, phasing, and developer selection for the Central Riverfront. The final Master Plan includes The Banks recommendations from the advisors.

Carter and The Dawson Co. were selected by the City of Cincinnati and Hamilton County as master developers for the 18-acre mixed-use project. Carter has also served as program manager for the construction of the city and county-funded parking garage and infrastructure components of The Banks project, including accommodation of parking for the Cincinnati Reds stadium. Bob Castellini, CEO of the Cincinnati Reds, was a chair of Joint Banks Steering Committee.

On November 1, 2007, Cincinnati City Council and Hamilton County approved of the project. Groundbreaking took place on April 2, 2008. The first phase, which opened in summer of 2011, included Current at the Banks, a building containing 300 apartment units atop 96,000 square feet of street-level retail space.

Phase II of The Banks broke ground in the summer of 2013, including projects with 300 apartment units, more than 60,000 square feet of street level retail, and more than 400 parking spaces along Vine Street between Second Street and Freedom Way.

According to a 2012 study of Phase I by The University of Cincinnati Economic Center, it was estimated that The Banks would have an ongoing economic impact of $91.6 million, as well as generating $556 million in construction-based impact. Upon completion, The Banks would be the region's largest mixed-use development and would house more than 3,000 residents. The City of Cincinnati, Hamilton County, and a joint venture between Carter and The Dawson Co. formed The Banks Public Private Partnership to secure funding and develop the project.

The SkyStar Wheel was scheduled to open at The Banks on August 31, 2018, but was delayed until September 1, 2018, due to weather. It opened to help celebrate the Banks' ten-year anniversary and was located across from the National Underground Railroad Freedom Center. The wheel remained open at this location until March 1, 2020. On July 2, 2019, it was announced that the owners, SkyView Partners, planned to return to the area and install a permanent 180-foot-tall (54.9 m) observation wheel set to open by March 5, 2021. However, the company indicated in December 2020 they had put the plans on hold due to the COVID-19 pandemic.

== Smale Riverfront Park ==
Smale Riverfront Park spans over 40 acres (160,000 m^{2}) of land along the Ohio River between Broadway and Central Avenue in Cincinnati, Ohio. It is named after John G. Smale, who gave $20 million for its construction in memory of his wife, Phyllis W. Smale.

=== Design ===
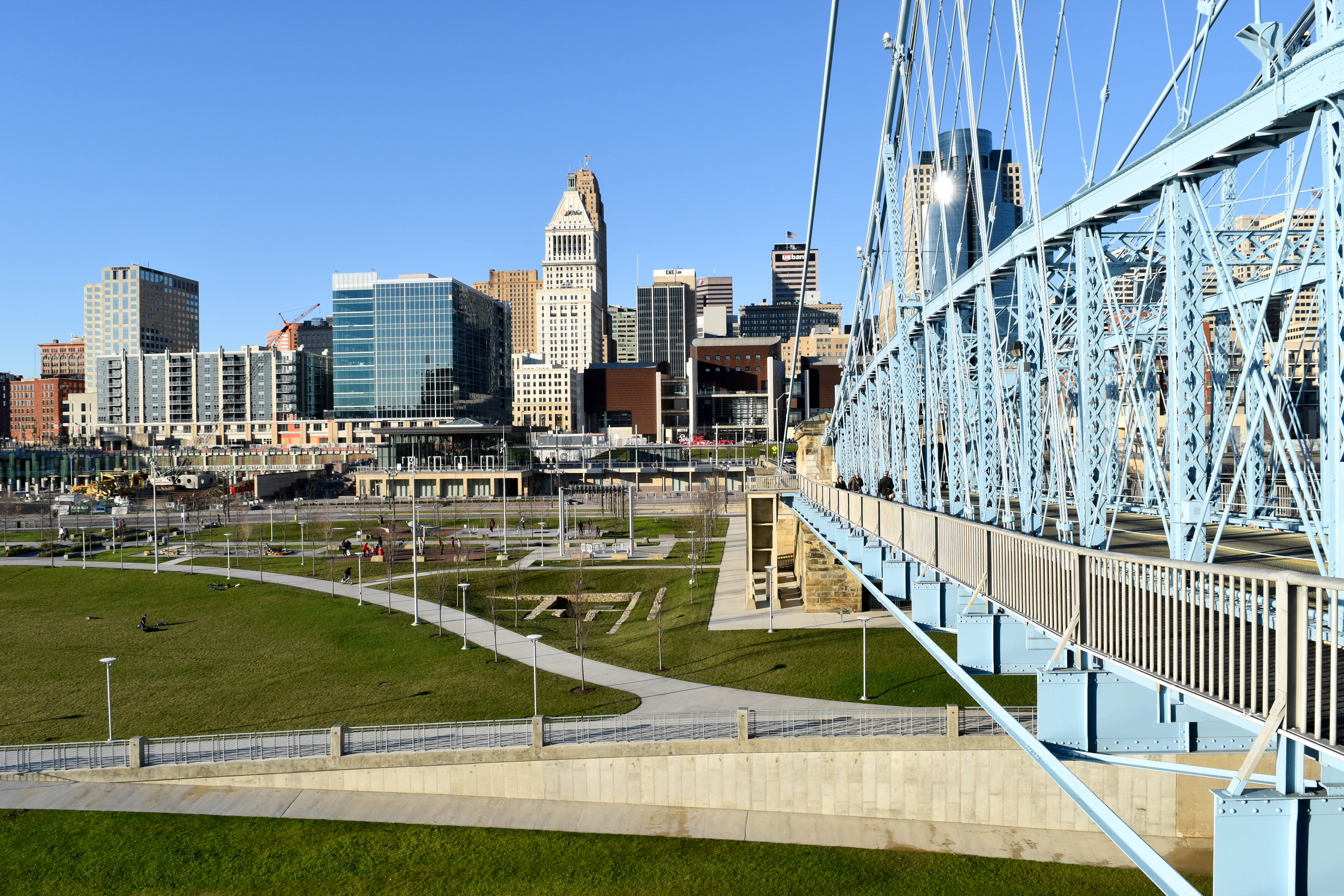
Smale Riverftont Park

The park connects Bicentennial Commons and Sawyer Point to form an almost 3-mile (5 km) corridor of public park along the river.

The park includes:

- Bike trails
- Boat docks
- Carousel
- Gardens
- Grand stairs
- Great lawn
- Green spaces for festivals and community events
- Playgrounds
- River's edge promenade with oversized "porch" swings
- Tree groves
- Walkways
- Water features (jets, cascades, pools and waterfalls)

Additionally, the park contains a historical marker indicating the position of home plate of the former Riverfront Stadium. The area occupied by the Banks and the Riverfront Park is the former site of this storied facility, razed in 2002 after the completion of Great American Ball Park to the east.

== Transportation ==
The master plan for The Banks project included the project as the southern terminus of the first phase of the then-proposed Cincinnati Streetcar system, linking Over-the-Rhine and Downtown to the riverfront and the new development. The proposed system came to fruition in 2016 as the Cincinnati Bell Connector.

== Neighborhood landmarks ==
=== In existence prior to development ===
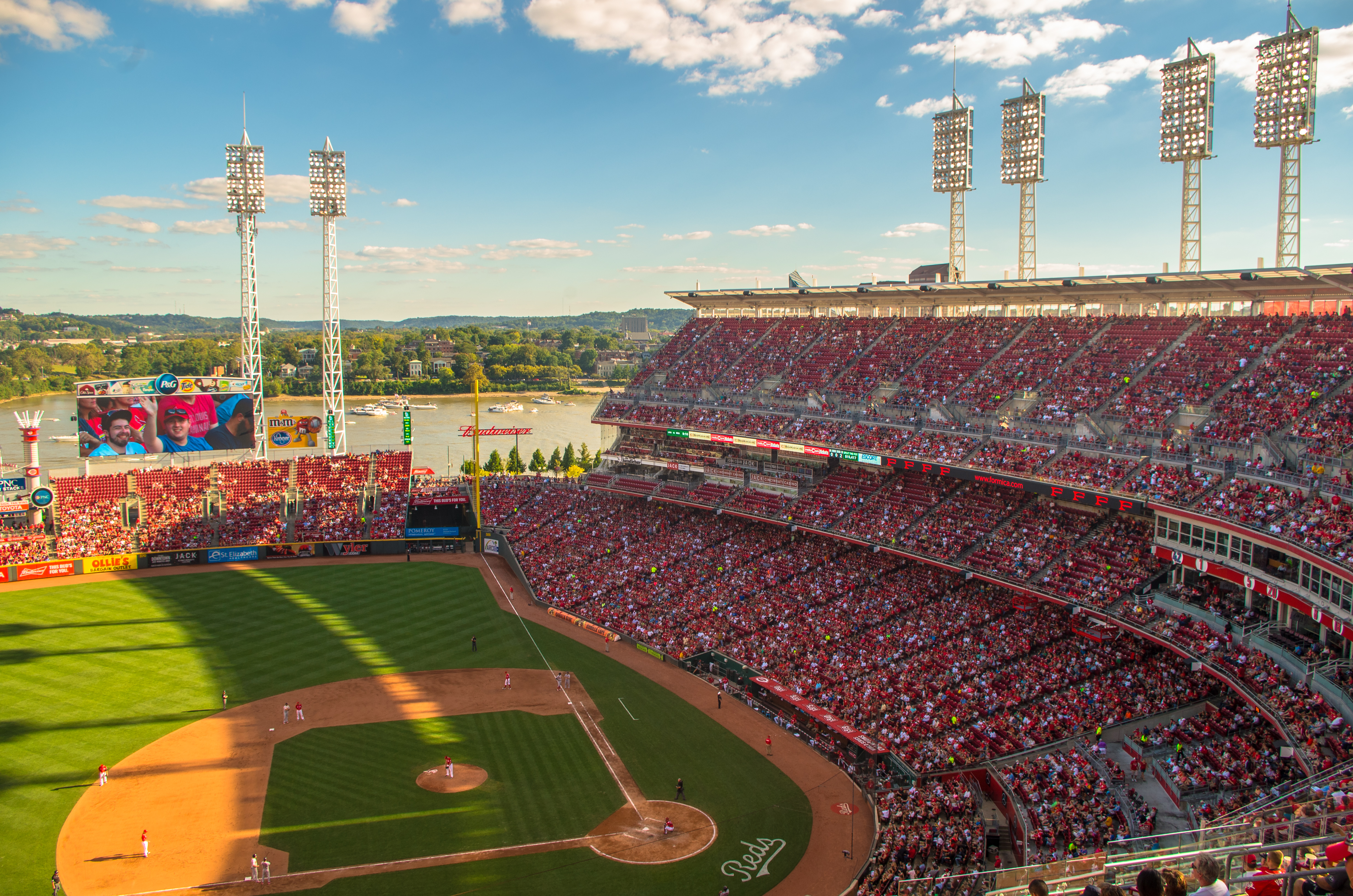
Great American Ball Park

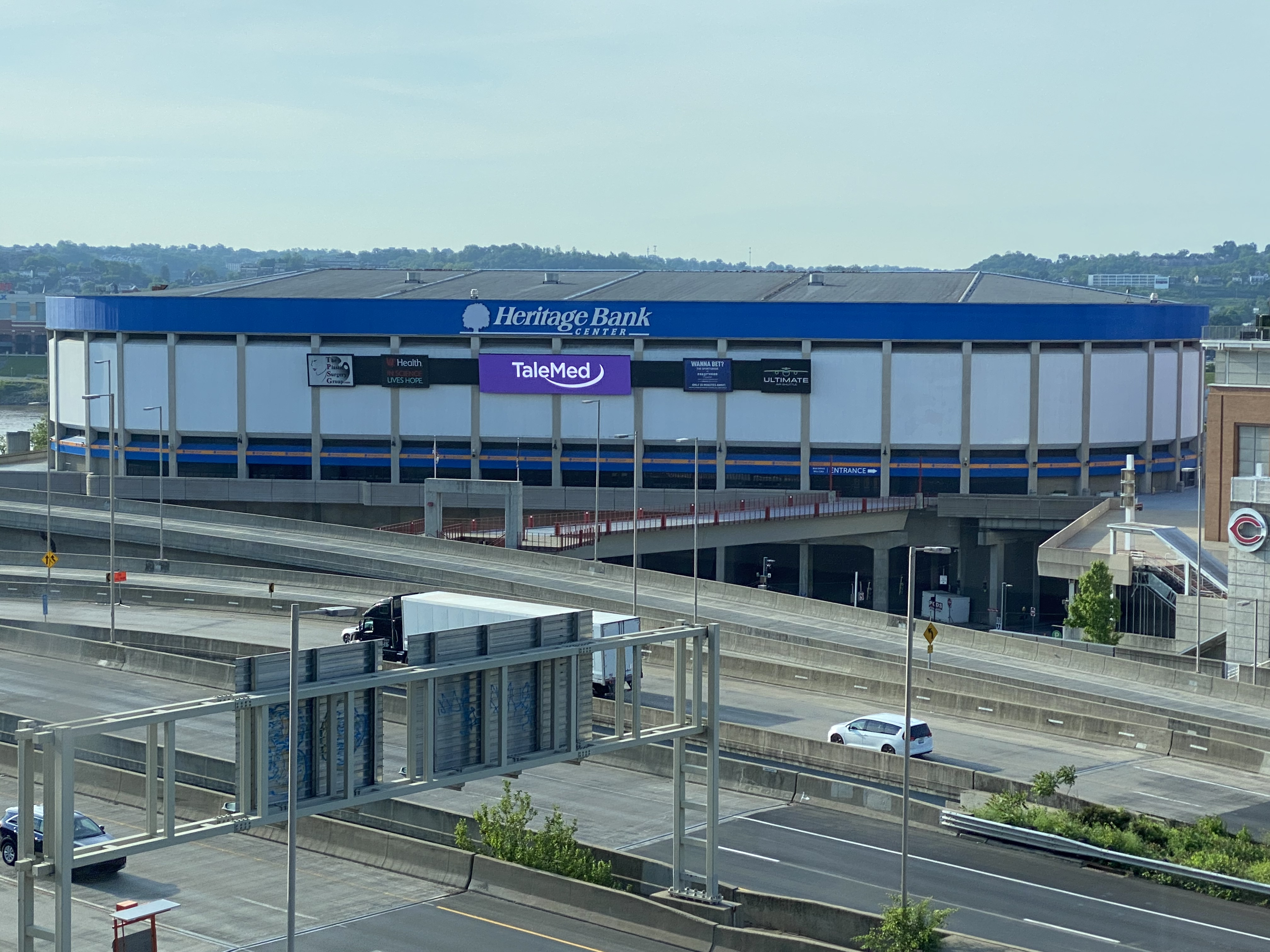
Heritage Bank Center

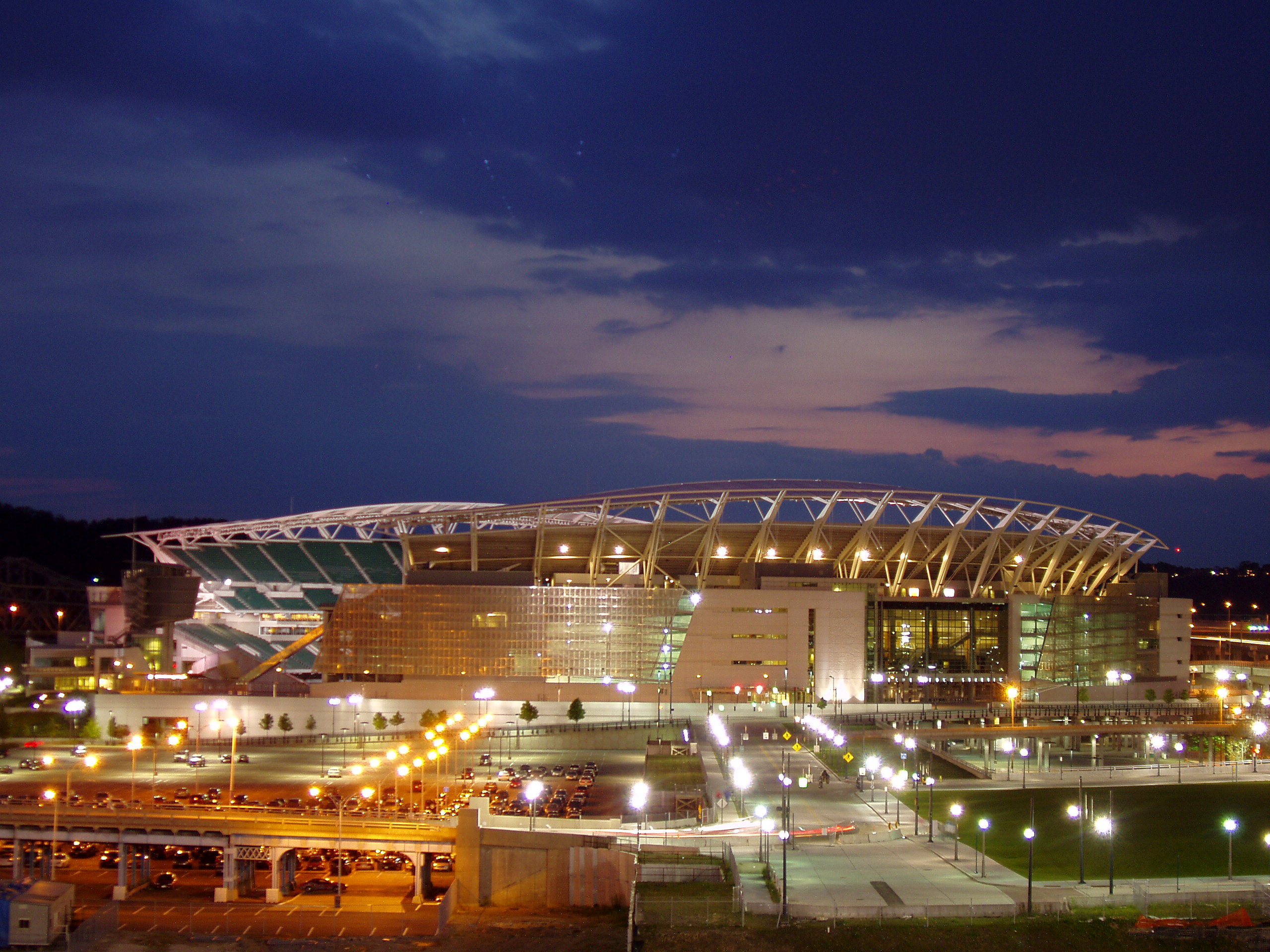
Paycor Stadium

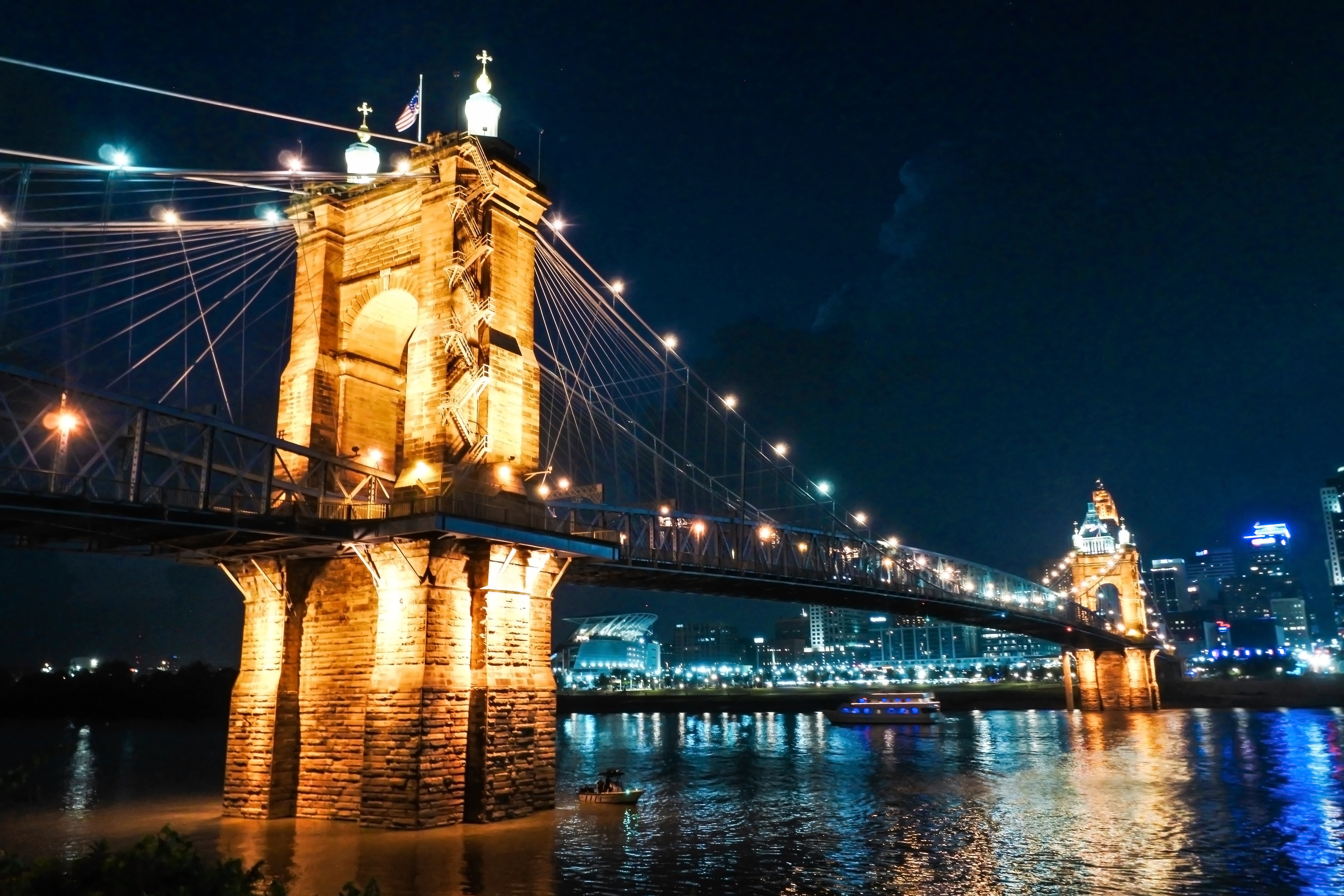
Roebling Bridge

=== Completed development projects ===
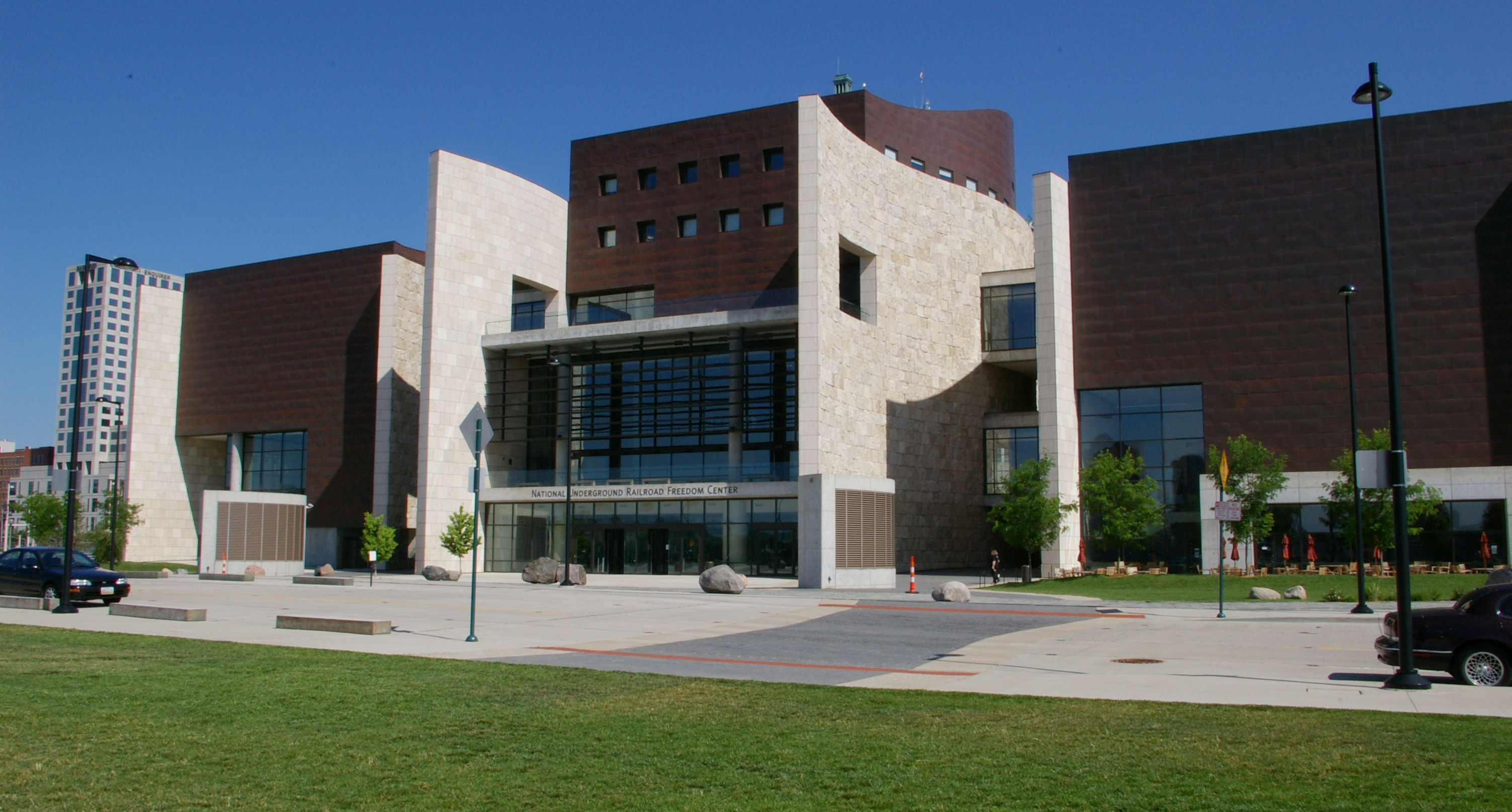
National Underground Railroad Freedom Center

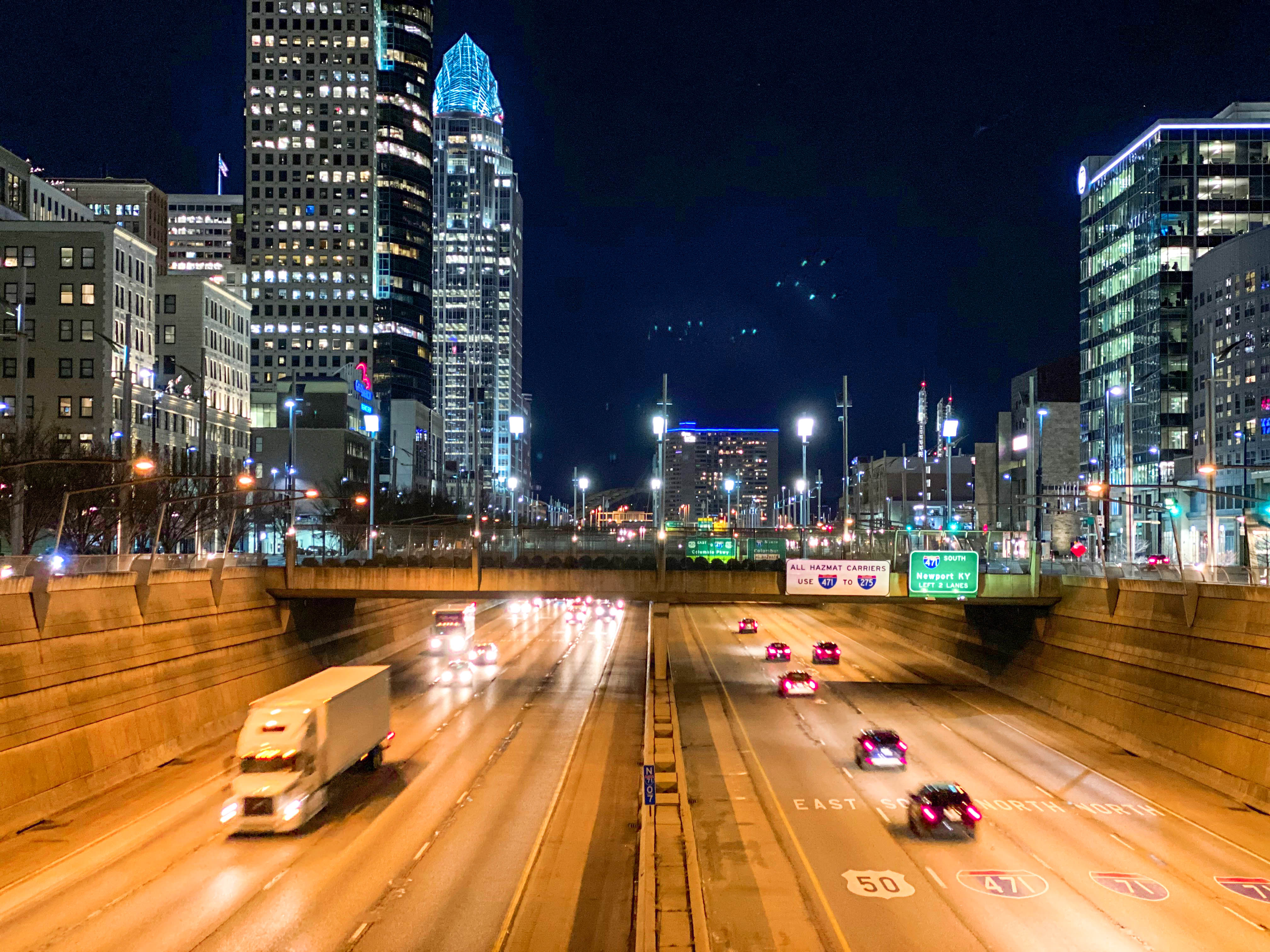
Redesign of Fort Washington Way

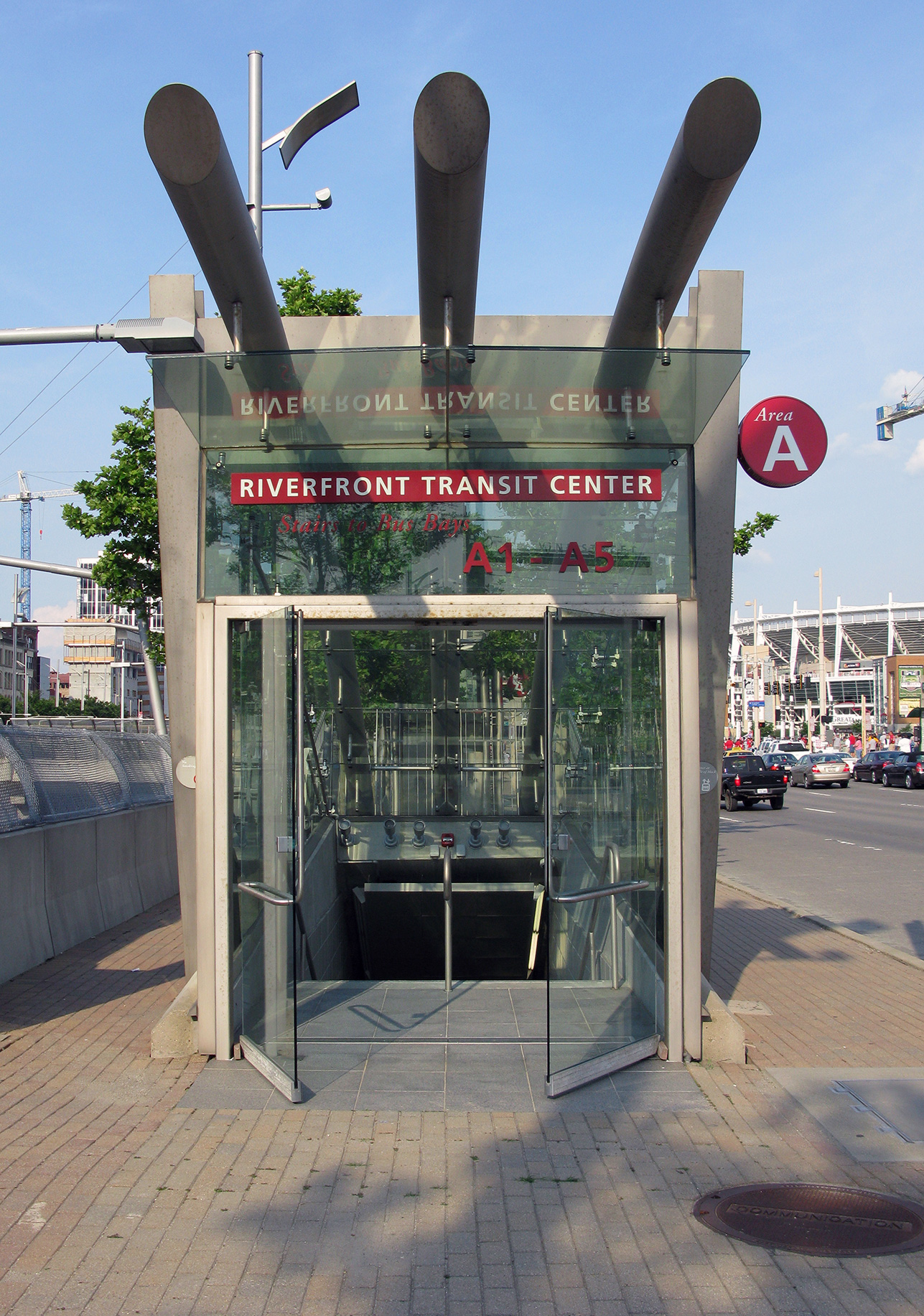
Riverfront Transit Center

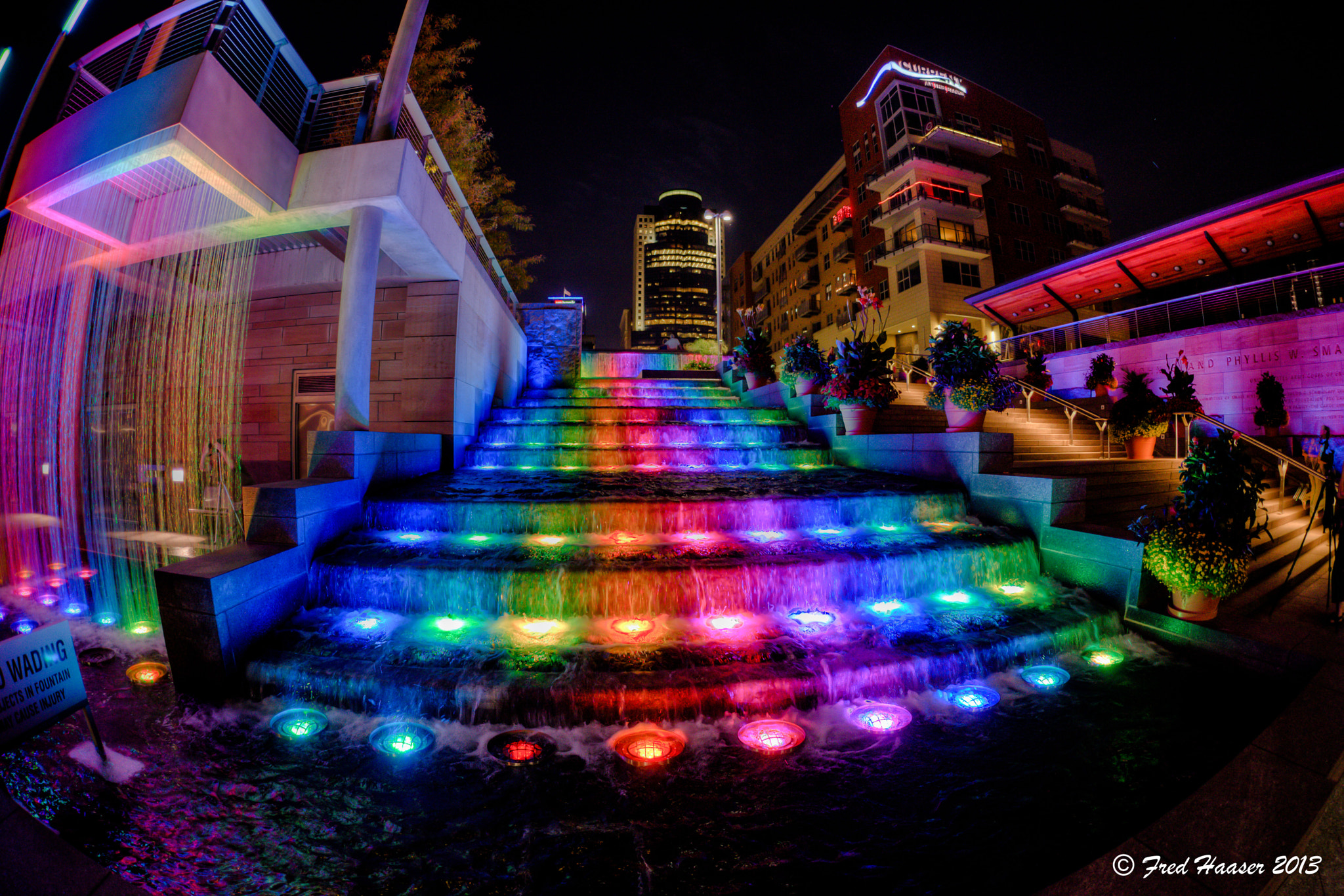
Smale Riverfront Park

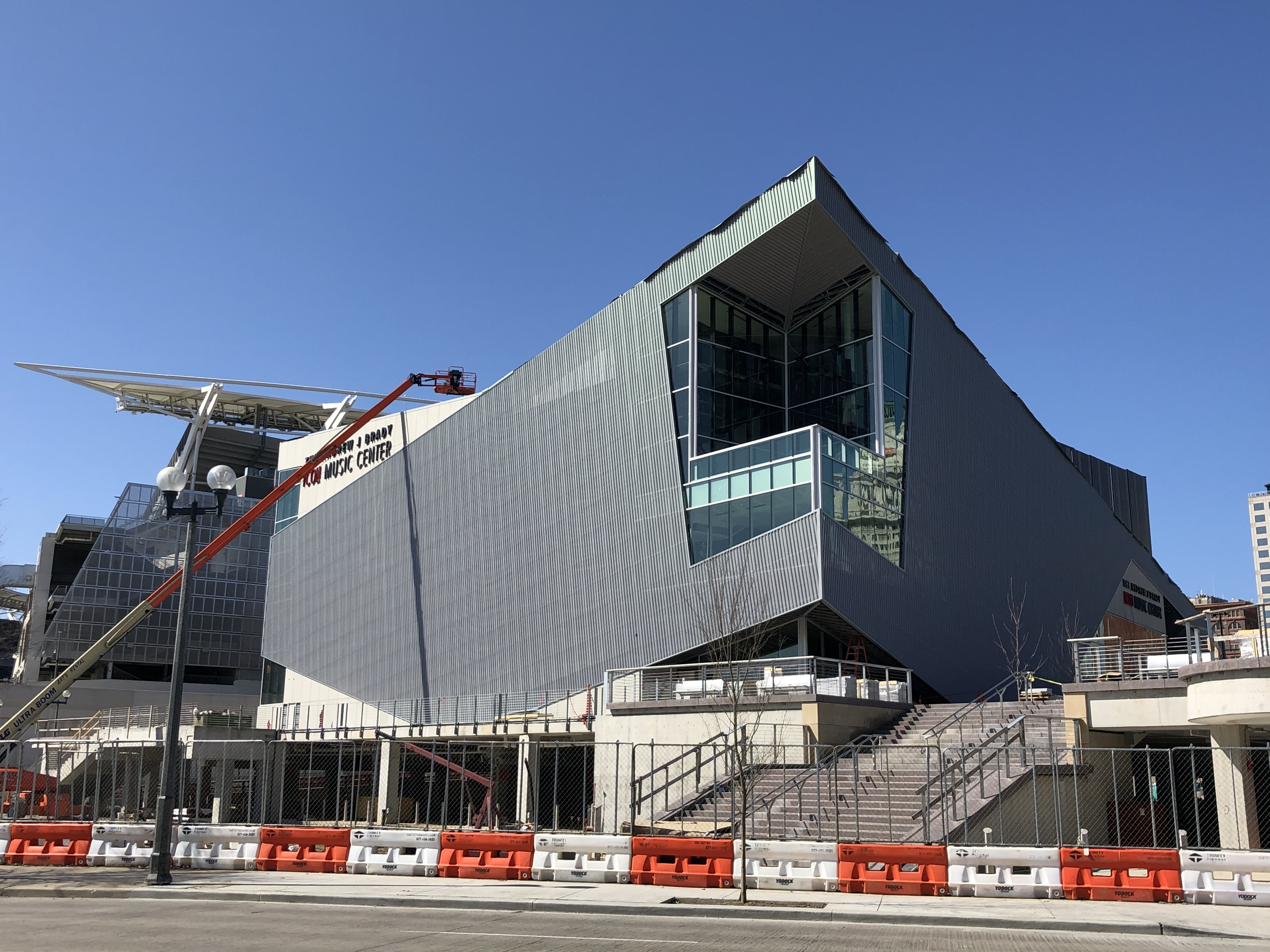
Andrew J. Brady Music Center

== Awards ==
- 2012 NAIOP Impact Award (Cincinnati chapter)
- 2013 National Planning Excellence Award for Implementation from American Planning Association (APA)
