= Washington Park (Cincinnati, Ohio) =

Park in Cincinnati

Washington Park Reserve
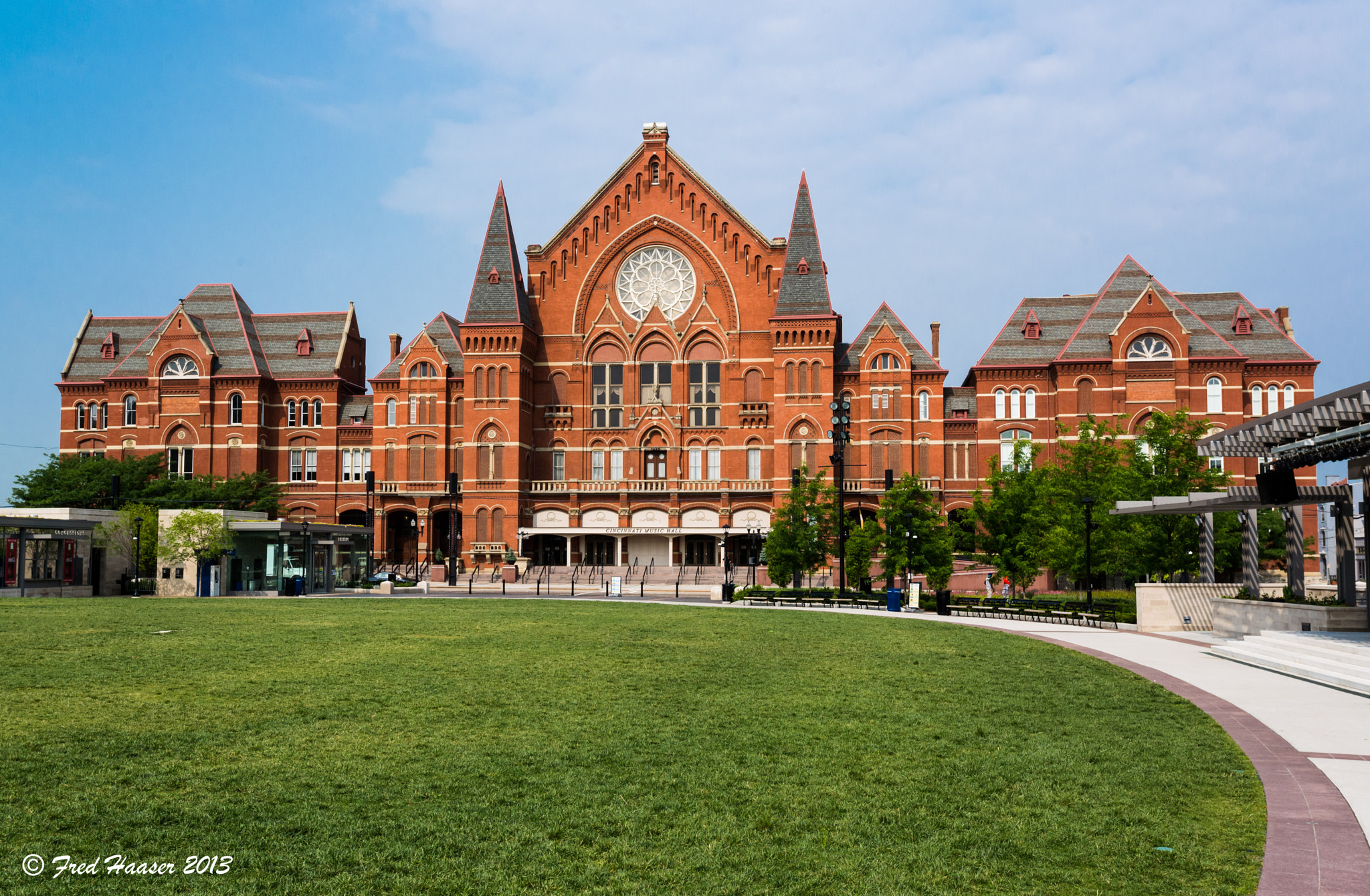
- Washington Park with Music Hall in the background
- Interactive map of Washington Park Reserve
- Type: Public
- Location: 1230 Elm Street, Over-the-Rhine, Cincinnati, Ohio
- Coordinates: 39°06′32″N 84°31′03″W
- Created: 1855
- Operator: Cincinnati Park Board
- Website: washingtonpark.org

Washington Park is bounded by West 12th, West 14th, Race, and Elm Streets in the Over-the-Rhine neighborhood of Cincinnati, Ohio, United States. The park is owned and operated by the Cincinnati Park Board. The 6-acre (2.4 ha) park served as Presbyterian and Episcopal cemeteries before it was acquired by the city from 1858 to 1863.

The park has an old-fashioned bandstand and many trees. Several American Civil War cannons and busts of Civil War heroes Frederick Hecker and Colonel Robert Latimer McCook, who commanded the German 9th Ohio Infantry (Die Neuner) are in the park. There is also a bronze tablet (1931) given by Sons and Daughters of the (Die Neuner) 9th O.V.I.

The Centennial Exposition of the Ohio Valley and Central States was held at the park in 1888. It was, in addition to the celebration of Ohio's progress, designed to celebrate the settlement of the Northwest Territory.

The park stands in the shadow of the Cincinnati Music Hall. While the now-demolished Washington Park School was located at its north end till 2007, a new School for Creative and Performing Arts currently stands across Twelfth Street at its south end. Along its east and west sides run the Connector Streetcar.

== Renovation ==
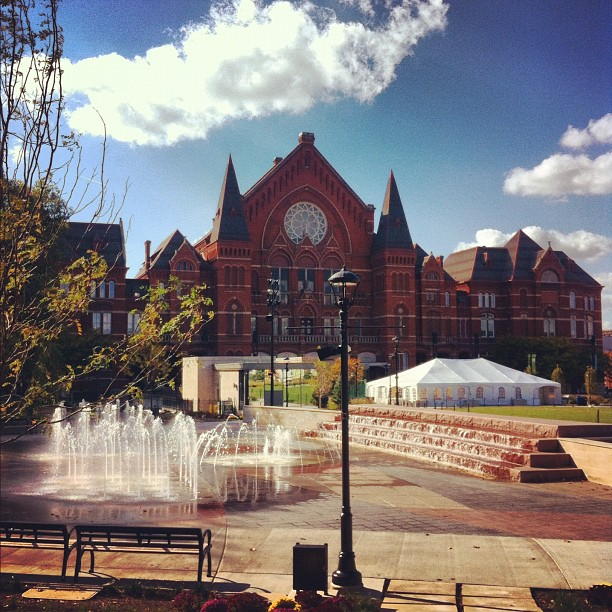
Fountains and event spaces

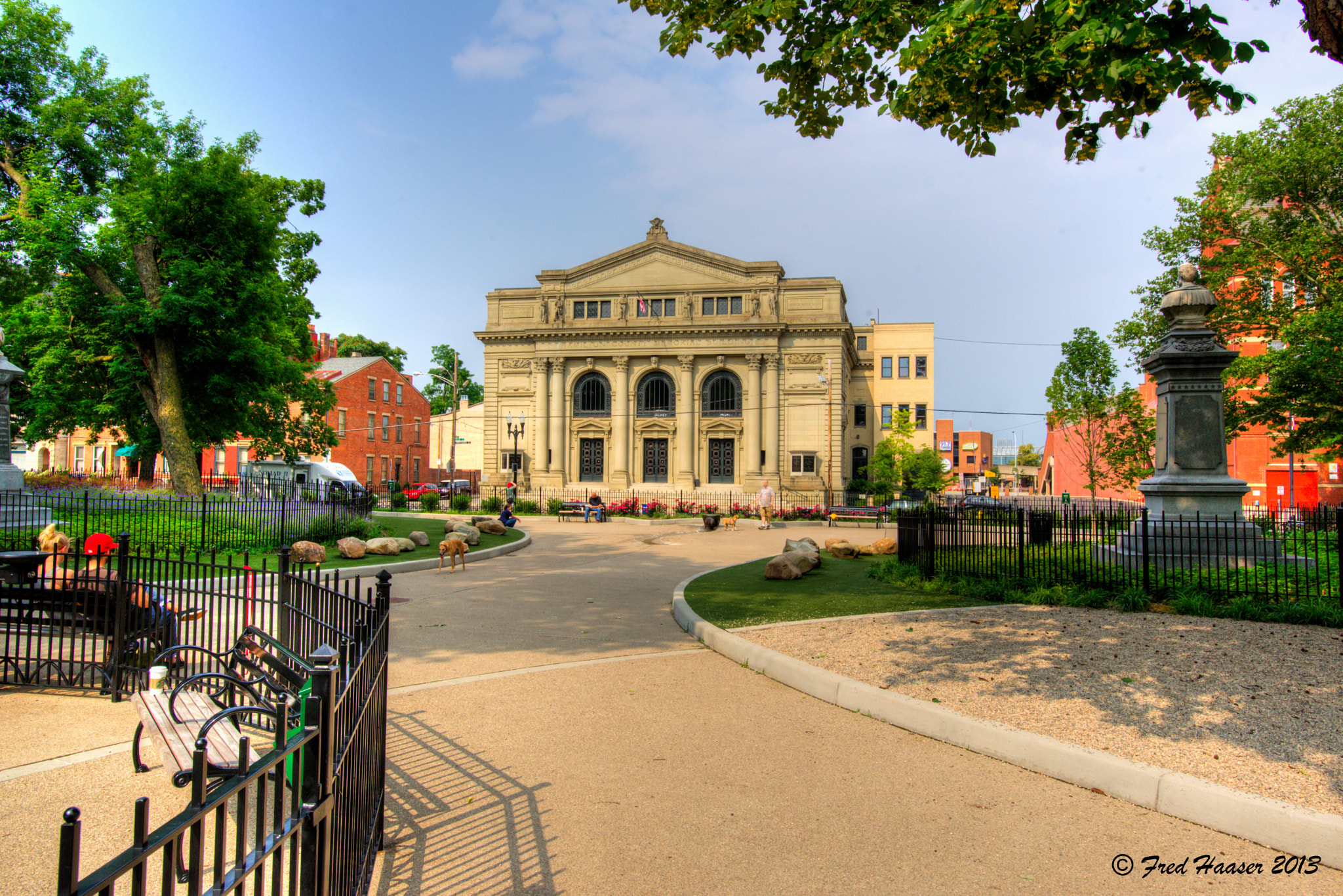
Dog park

Cincinnati Park Board and Nonprofit developer 3CDC finished renovation of the park in July 2012 after being closed for almost 18 months. The park officially reopened on Friday, July 6, 2012, with a ribbon cutting ceremony and a concert by the Mukunoki Chorus of Gifu, Japan, in town for the World Choir Games, which had just begun in Cincinnati. The renovations cost about $46 million. This included expansion of the park from 6 acres (24,000 m^{2}) to 8 acres (32,000 m^{2}), removal of its public pool and construction of a parking garage beneath it for up to 450 cars. The parking garage and expansion was located on the land made available through the gifting of the land where Washington Park School stood previously. In a similar renovation of Fountain Square, 3CDC used profits from parking to pay off loans it took out to develop the project. 3CDC is responsible for programming at the park and plans to offer programs regularly. Some events that have taken place since the renovation include a concert series with jazz, R&B, and bluegrass; movie screenings; yoga; a kickball league; and a concert by the band Over the Rhine.
