= 3CDC =

Non-profit real-estate development and finance organization

Cincinnati Center City Development Corporation
- Type: Non-profit
- Founded: 2003 in Cincinnati, Ohio
- Headquarters: Over-the-Rhine
- Key people: Stephen G. Leeper (President & CEO); Adam Gelter (Executive VP, Development); Tim Szilasi (Senior VP & CFO); Christy Samad (Senior VP, Event Management)
- Revenue: ▼US$38,207,083 (2018); US$59,987,941 (2017)
- Total assets: ▲US$413,225,233 (2018); US$349,748,267 (2017)
- Number of employees: 291 (2018)
- Website: 3CDC.org

Cincinnati Center City Development Corporation (3CDC) is a private, non-profit real-estate development and finance organization focused on strategically revitalizing Cincinnati's downtown urban core in partnership with the City of Cincinnati and the Cincinnati corporate community. Its work is specifically focused on the central business district and in the Over-the-Rhine (OTR) neighborhood. The organization played the key role in revitalizing OTR, which during the early 2000s was considered one of the most dangerous neighborhoods in the United States. While the organization began as a full-service real estate developer, it has since branched out and become a significant event programmer in Cincinnati, producing over 1,000 events per year at the four civic spaces it manages: Fountain Square, Washington Park, Ziegler Park and Memorial Hall.

== History ==
In 2001, the Over The Rhine Neighborhood experienced riots following the death of Timothy Thomas, a 19-year-old unarmed African American man at the hands of a police officer. This prompted the city to begin planning for a large scale redevelopment of the neighborhood via a 2002 neighborhood plan. After this, in July 2003, 3CDC was formed by former mayor of Cincinnati, Charlie Luken and with backing from several corporations in Cincinnati such as Procter and Gamble. This was a result of a recommendation by a City of Cincinnati Economic Development Task Force. Most funds are gathered through corporate contributions. In 2004, 3CDC accepted responsibility for overseeing Cincinnati New Markets Fund and Cincinnati Equity Fund. As of May 2018, those funds total over $250 million and have resulted in over $1.3 billion invested in downtown and Over-the-Rhine real estate projects.

== Controversy ==
Some long-term residents of the Over-the-Rhine neighborhood have voiced concern that 3CDC does not sufficiently attend to the concerns of long-term residents of the neighborhood, which was 75% African-American in 2000, and has since fallen to 42% in 2020. This has led to claims of gentrification being caused by 3CDC's development and that it is displacing the existing population and businesses. Since the year 2000, the population of Over-the-Rhine has also fallen from 6,400 to 5,200.

On three occasions, the Cincinnati Board of Housing Appeals has accused 3CDC of "demolition by neglect" (a first-degree misdemeanor in Cincinnati) by allowing vacant buildings to be neglected until they require emergency demolition.

In April 2026, the Cincinnati Parks Board voted to lease Piatt Park in Downtown Cincinnati for a proposed redevelopment. This was done without prior community engagement or knowledge on the proposal. The park weekly food serves lead by the local chapter of Food Not Bombs, which was called a "persistent misuse of the space" by 3CDC in their presentation to the Parks Board. Following this announcement, a petition was created by the Cincinnati DSA chapter to protest the planned redevelopment, along with calls for people to attend city hall and protest the change. Additionally, the same day as the redevelopment was announced, 3CDC bought the Garfield Suites hotel, adjacent to Piatt Park. As of October 2026, the redevelopment has stalled due to 3CDC not receiving grants from the state of Ohio. The lease is set to terminate if redevelopment does not begin within 12 months of its signing.

== Projects ==
- Fountain Square plaza and garage: October 2005 – October 2006
- Washington Park: August 2010 – February 2011
- Vine Street streetscape project: Summer 2009 – present
- Over-the-Rhine: ongoing project redeveloping streets starting with Vine Street and Central Parkway
