= National Register of Historic Places listings in Hamilton County, Ohio =

Location of Hamilton County in Ohio

This is a list of the National Register of Historic Places listings in Hamilton County, Ohio.

This is intended to be a complete list of the properties and districts on the National Register of Historic Places in Hamilton County, Ohio, United States. Latitude and longitude coordinates are provided for many National Register properties and districts; these locations may be seen together in a map.

There are 399 properties and districts listed on the National Register in the county, including 14 National Historic Landmarks. The city of Cincinnati is the location of 298 of these properties and districts, including 12 National Historic Landmarks; they are listed separately, while the remaining 99 properties and districts, including 3 National Historic Landmarks, are listed here.

This National Park Service list is complete through NPS recent listings posted September 11, 2026.

== Current listings ==
=== Outside Cincinnati ===
	Name on the Register	Image	Date listed	Location	City or town	Description
1	Arlington School	Arlington School	December 16, 2022 (#100008459)	607 Carthage Ave. 39°13′05″N 84°27′17″W	Arlington Heights	
2	Joseph W. Baldwin House	Joseph W. Baldwin House	August 25, 1986 (#86001628)	217 Springfield Pike; 39°13′18″N 84°28′25″W	Wyoming	
3	Joseph and Cecilia Bappert House	Joseph and Cecilia Bappert House	August 29, 2016 (#16000596)	1550 Neeb Rd. 39°07′23″N 84°38′02″W	Green Township	
4	James Baxter House	James Baxter House	July 22, 1994 (#94000774)	2930 Fair Acres Dr. 39°11′33″N 84°25′57″W	Amberley	
5	Becker House	Becker House	July 18, 1974 (#74001522)	179 W. Crescentville Rd. 39°18′06″N 84°28′28″W	Springdale	
6	Benham Mound	Benham Mound	July 30, 1974 (#74001508)	Section 30 of the original Columbia Township, off Montgomery Rd. 39°11′38″N 84°25′31″W	Amberley	
7	George Bennett House	George Bennett House	May 29, 1975 (#75001426)	10281 Harrison Pike; 39°14′45″N 84°46′58″W	Harrison	
8	Blair House	Blair House	November 30, 1982 (#82001466)	7844 Remington Rd (at West St.); 39°13′42″N 84°21′34″W	Montgomery	
9	Cyrus Broadwell House	Cyrus Broadwell House	May 29, 1975 (#75001433)	Northeast of Newtown at 3882 Mount Carmel Rd. 39°07′58″N 84°18′35″W	Anderson Township	
10	Jacob Bromwell House	Jacob Bromwell House	August 25, 1986 (#86001629)	69 Mt. Pleasant Ave. 39°13′24″N 84°28′47″W	Wyoming	
11	Brown-Gorman Farm	Brown-Gorman Farm	August 1, 2012 (#12000463)	10052 Reading Rd. 39°14′42″N 84°25′28″W	Evendale	
12	Burchenal Mound	Burchenal Mound	May 29, 1975 (#75001437)	West of benchmark 659 above Mill Creek; 39°15′38″N 84°28′23″W	Woodlawn	
13	Wesley Butler Archeological District	Wesley Butler Archeological District	July 24, 1976 (#76001446)	Off U.S. Route 50 southwest of Elizabethtown; 39°09′16″N 84°48′48″W	Whitewater Township	
14	Hugh Campbell House	Hugh Campbell House	November 7, 1976 (#76001448)	332 Weathervane Rd. 39°15′03″N 84°48′43″W	Harrison	
15	Cheviot Fieldhouse	Cheviot Fieldhouse	April 1, 2009 (#09000170)	3729 Robb Ave. 39°09′22″N 84°37′12″W	Cheviot	
16	Cincinnati & Suburban Bell Telephone Co. Norwood Exchange		September 14, 2026 (#100013385)	2216 Norwood Avenue, 49 26 Montgomery Road; 39°09′53″N 84°27′10″W	Norwood	
17	Cincinnati and Whitewater Canal Tunnel	Cincinnati and Whitewater Canal Tunnel	May 25, 2001 (#01000562)	Parallel to Miami Ave., junction of Wamsley and Miami Ave. 39°09′18″N 84°44′58″W	Cleves and North Bend	
18	Clough Creek and Sand Ridge Archeological District	Clough Creek and Sand Ridge Archeological District	October 1, 1974 (#74001509)	Along the ridge to the west of the Union Bridge; 39°06′46″N 84°23′48″W	Anderson Township	
19	Clovernook	Clovernook	June 18, 1973 (#73001454)	7000 Hamilton Ave. 39°13′12″N 84°32′56″W	North College Hill	
20	Colerain Works Archeological District	Colerain Works Archeological District	June 18, 1976 (#76001445)	Eastern bank of the Great Miami River, north of the site of Fort Dunlap; 39°17′53″N 84°39′36″W	Colerain Township	
21	Conrad Mound Archeological Site	Conrad Mound Archeological Site	June 20, 1975 (#75001420)	Off Rittenhouse Rd., southwest of Cleves; 39°08′49″N 84°46′20″W	Miami Township	
22	Dravo Gravel Site	Dravo Gravel Site	December 22, 1978 (#78002083)	On a bluff above the Great Miami River, north of Cleves; 39°11′28″N 84°45′00″W	Miami Township	
23	Dunlap Archeological District	Dunlap Archeological District	October 21, 1975 (#75001421)	Eastern bank of the Great Miami River, near the junction of Dunlap and Great Miami River Rds. 39°17′36″N 84°39′12″W	Colerain Township	Also known as Fort Dunlap
24	William Edwards Farmhouse	William Edwards Farmhouse	October 4, 1989 (#89001455)	3851 Edwards Rd. 39°07′41″N 84°20′30″W	Newtown	
25	Eighteen Mile House	Eighteen Mile House	October 10, 1975 (#75001427)	2 mi (3.2 km) southeast of Harrison at Harrison Pike and Patriot Dr. 39°14′18″N 84°46′06″W	Harrison Township	
26	Elliott House	Elliott House	October 29, 1976 (#76001451)	9352 Given Rd., south of Remington; 39°13′23″N 84°19′16″W	Indian Hill	
27	Charles Fay House	Charles Fay House	August 25, 1986 (#86001630)	325 Reily Rd. 39°13′41″N 84°28′46″W	Wyoming	
28	Eliphalet Ferris House	Eliphalet Ferris House	May 29, 1975 (#75001431)	3915 Plainville Rd. 39°08′50″N 84°22′42″W	Mariemont	
29	Joseph Ferris House	Joseph Ferris House	June 30, 1975 (#75001417)	5729 Dragon Way; 39°08′28″N 84°23′31″W	Fairfax	
30	Glendale Historic District	Glendale Historic District	July 20, 1976 (#76001447)	State Route 747; Roughly bounded by OH 4/Springfield Pike, Oak Rd., RR right of way, Coral, Sharon and Morse Aves. 39°16′17″N 84°27′49″W	Glendale	Second set of addresses represent a boundary alteration approved December 18, 2018
31	Glendale Police Station	Glendale Police Station	March 27, 1975 (#75001425)	305 E. Sharon Ave. 39°16′18″N 84°27′30″W	Glendale	
32	Greenhills Historic District	Greenhills Historic District	January 12, 1989 (#88003066)	Roughly Damon Rd., Enfield St., Farragut Rd., Flanders Ln., Winton Rd., Andover Rd., Burley Cir., and Cromwell Rd. 39°15′50″N 84°31′28″W	Greenhills	
33	Hahn Field Archeological District	Hahn Field Archeological District	October 29, 1974 (#74001519)	Above the Little Miami River in Clear Creek Park, 0.4 miles (0.64 km) north of State Route 32; 39°07′38″N 84°22′47″W	Anderson Township	
34	William Henry Harrison Tomb State Memorial	William Henry Harrison Tomb State Memorial	November 10, 1970 (#70000499)	Mount Nebo on State Route 128; 39°09′06″N 84°45′08″W	North Bend	
35	Harrison-Landers House	Harrison-Landers House	May 29, 1975 (#75001434)	3881 Newtown Rd., north of Newtown; 39°08′03″N 84°21′18″W	Anderson Township	
36	Elmer Hess House	Elmer Hess House	August 25, 1986 (#86001633)	333 Springfield Pike; 39°13′27″N 84°28′24″W	Wyoming	
37	Jediah Hill Covered Bridge	Jediah Hill Covered Bridge	March 28, 1973 (#73001460)	7 mi (11 km) north of Cincinnati off U.S. Route 127 on Covered Bridge Rd. 39°15′08″N 84°32′44″W	Springfield Township	
38	Jefferson Schoolhouse	Jefferson Schoolhouse	March 17, 1976 (#76001450)	Indian Hill and Drake Rds. 39°09′40″N 84°20′49″W	Indian Hill	
39	Jehu John House	Jehu John House	October 31, 1975 (#75001428)	East of Harrison on Stone Dr. 39°15′28″N 84°47′48″W	Harrison	
40	Josiah Kirby House	Josiah Kirby House	August 25, 1986 (#86001634)	65 Oliver Rd. 39°13′54″N 84°28′27″W	Wyoming	
41	Gretchen Kroger Barnes Graf House	Gretchen Kroger Barnes Graf House	February 4, 2011 (#10001213)	9575 Cunningham Rd. 39°11′56″N 84°18′18″W	Indian Hill	
42	Othniel Looker House	Othniel Looker House	June 5, 1975 (#75001429)	10580 Marvin Rd., north of Harrison; 39°16′26″N 84°48′11″W	Harrison Township	
43	Luethstrom-Hurin House	Luethstrom-Hurin House	August 25, 1986 (#86001635)	30 Reily Rd. 39°13′42″N 84°28′25″W	Wyoming	
44	Madeira Railroad Depot		October 11, 2022 (#100008258)	7701 Railroad Ave. 39°11′17″N 84°21′48″W	Madeira	
45	Main Theatre	Main Theatre	December 27, 2017 (#100001934)	7428 Hamilton Ave. 39°13′52″N 84°32′54″W	Mt. Healthy	
46	Mariemont Embankment and Village Site	Mariemont Embankment and Village Site	October 16, 1974 (#74001517)	Southern side of Mariemont, above the Little Miami River; 39°08′27″N 84°22′45″W	Mariemont	
47	Mariemont Historic District	Mariemont Historic District	July 24, 1979 (#79001862)	U.S. Route 50; also bordering both sides of U.S. Route 50, bounded by Westover industrial section, Beech St., Murray and Grove Aves., and the Little Miami River; 39°08′35″N 84°22′51″W	Mariemont	Declared a National Historic Landmark District on March 29, 2007 under the name of "Village of Mariemont". Second set of boundaries represents the increased boundaries of the National Historic Landmark District.
48	Joseph Martin House		January 15, 1984 (#14000781)	6836 School St. 39°07′46″N 84°21′35″W	Newtown	Moved a short distance in 1983.
49	Mater Dei Chapel		March 4, 2024 (#100010003)	Mount St. Joseph University, 395 Neeb Road; 39°05′44″N 84°38′16″W	Delhi Township	Incorrectly listed as being in Cincinnati.
50	Mathew Mound	Mathew Mound	May 29, 1975 (#75001424)	Atop the hill on the northern side of Oak Rd. 39°15′44″N 84°26′34″W	Glendale	
51	Thomas Miller House	Thomas Miller House	November 2, 2000 (#00001294)	11294 U.S. Route 50; 39°09′36″N 84°48′55″W	Whitewater Township	
52	Miller-Leuser Log House	Miller-Leuser Log House	August 30, 1974 (#74001511)	Clough Pike and Newton Rd. in Turpin Hills; 39°06′06″N 84°22′07″W	Anderson Township	
53	Montgomery Saltbox Houses	Montgomery Saltbox Houses	July 28, 1987 (#87001254)	7789 and 7795 Cooper Rd. 39°13′35″N 84°21′24″W	Montgomery	
54	Charles H. Moore House	Charles H. Moore House	August 25, 1986 (#86001636)	749 Stout Ave. 39°13′55″N 84°28′11″W	Wyoming	
55	Mt. Healthy Public School	Mt. Healthy Public School	May 2, 1985 (#85000946)	Compton and Harrison Aves. 39°13′58″N 84°33′00″W	Mt. Healthy	
56	Mt. Nebo Archeological District	Mt. Nebo Archeological District	March 3, 1975 (#75001435)	Along the Great Miami River, west of North Bend; 39°08′42″N 84°47′31″W	Miami Township	
57	Norwood Mound	Norwood Mound	May 2, 1974 (#74001520)	Off Indian Mound Ave. 39°10′04″N 84°26′45″W	Norwood	
58	Norwood Municipal Building	Norwood Municipal Building	March 11, 1980 (#80003093)	4645 Montgomery Rd. 39°09′42″N 84°27′22″W	Norwood	
59	Nurre-Royston House	Nurre-Royston House	January 8, 2009 (#08001295)	4330 Errun Ln. 39°09′49″N 84°29′39″W	St. Bernard	
60	Odd Fellows' Cemetery Mound	Odd Fellows' Cemetery Mound	June 18, 1973 (#73001474)	Along Round Bottom Rd. 39°07′49″N 84°21′36″W	Newtown	
61	Old Gothic Barns	Old Gothic Barns	July 20, 1976 (#76001438)	6058 Colerain Ave. in White Oak East; 39°12′13″N 84°34′49″W	Green Township	
62	Professor William Pabodie House	Professor William Pabodie House	August 25, 1986 (#86001638)	731 Brooks Ave. 39°13′52″N 84°28′35″W	Wyoming	
63	Perin Village Site	Perin Village Site	March 25, 1977 (#77001067)	0.3 miles (0.48 km) northwest of the Odd Fellows' Cemetery Mound; 39°07′49″N 84°21′36″W	Newtown	
64	Pine Meer	Pine Meer	November 30, 1982 (#82001468)	5336 Cleves-Warsaw Pike, west of Cincinnati; 39°07′13″N 84°37′04″W	Green Township	
65	John C. Pollock House	John C. Pollock House	August 25, 1986 (#86001639)	88 Reily Rd. 39°13′43″N 84°28′35″W	Wyoming	
66	Frederick and Harriet Rauh House		September 6, 2016 (#16000597)	10068 Leacrest Rd. 39°14′58″N 84°29′18″W	Woodlawn	
67	Rennert Mound Archeological District	Rennert Mound Archeological District	March 4, 1975 (#75001422)	Western side of Elizabethtown; 39°09′34″N 84°48′30″W	Whitewater Township	
68	W.C. Retszch House	W.C. Retszch House	August 25, 1986 (#86001642)	129 Springfield Pike; 39°13′14″N 84°28′26″W	Wyoming	
69	Riddle-Friend House	Riddle-Friend House	August 25, 1986 (#86001643)	507 Springfield Pike; 39°13′37″N 84°28′23″W	Wyoming	
70	Roudebush Farm	Roudebush Farm	June 17, 1976 (#76001449)	8643 Kilby Rd., southeast of Harrison; 39°14′10″N 84°47′01″W	Harrison Township	
71	St. Francis Seminary	St. Francis Seminary	March 5, 1999 (#99000275)	10290 Mill Rd. 39°15′28″N 84°32′32″W	Springfield Township	
72	Salem Methodist Church Complex	Salem Methodist Church Complex	April 29, 1982 (#82003586)	6137 Salem Rd. 39°04′31″N 84°23′29″W	Anderson Township	
73	Louis Sawyer House	Louis Sawyer House	August 25, 1986 (#86001645)	315 Reily Rd. 39°13′41″N 84°28′40″W	Wyoming	
74	Shawnee Lookout Archeological District	Shawnee Lookout Archeological District	December 2, 1974 (#74001516)	In Shawnee Lookout, southwest of Cleves; 39°07′30″N 84°47′56″W	Miami Township	
75	Edwin M. Shield's House	Edwin M. Shield's House	April 1, 1982 (#82003592)	220 Riverside Ave. 39°16′01″N 84°15′44″W	Loveland	
76	Smith-Jessup House	Smith-Jessup House	August 23, 1984 (#84003717)	1038 W. North Bend Rd. in Finneytown; 39°12′07″N 84°31′47″W	Springfield Township	
77	State Line Archeological District	State Line Archeological District	July 24, 1975 (#75001423)	Straddling the Ohio/Indiana border, 2 miles (3.2 km) north of the Ohio River; 39°08′15″N 84°49′12″W	Whitewater Township	Extends into Dearborn County, Indiana
78	Edward R. Stearns House	Edward R. Stearns House	August 25, 1986 (#86001648)	333 Oliver Rd. 39°13′54″N 84°28′45″W	Wyoming	
79	William Stearns House	William Stearns House	August 25, 1986 (#86001649)	320 Reily Rd. 39°13′46″N 84°28′44″W	Wyoming	
80	Sunny Knolls-Gordon E. Pape House	Sunny Knolls-Gordon E. Pape House	June 9, 2006 (#06000484)	8725 Blome Rd. 39°12′55″N 84°20′42″W	Indian Hill	
81	John Tangeman House	John Tangeman House	August 25, 1986 (#86001650)	550 Larchmont; 39°13′39″N 84°28′31″W	Wyoming	
82	Gerald B. and Beverley Tonkens House	Gerald B. and Beverley Tonkens House	October 3, 1991 (#91001414)	6980 Knoll Rd. 39°11′43″N 84°24′54″W	Amberley	
83	Turpin Site	Turpin Site	December 27, 1974 (#74001514)	On the old Turpin farmstead at 3295 Turpin Ln. 39°07′23″N 84°22′19″W	Anderson Township	
84	Twelve Mile House	Twelve Mile House	September 1, 1976 (#76001452)	11006 Reading Rd. 39°16′07″N 84°24′46″W	Sharonville	
85	Twin Oaks	Twin Oaks	May 29, 1975 (#86001640)	629 Liddle Lane; 39°13′46″N 84°28′53″W	Wyoming	Also known as the Robert Reily House
86	United Brethren in Christ	United Brethren in Christ	June 13, 1978 (#78002082)	South of Cincinnati off Interstate 275; 39°03′12″N 84°22′29″W	Anderson Township	
87	United Methodist Church	United Methodist Church	December 4, 1975 (#75001432)	5125 Drake Rd., northeast of Mariemont; 39°09′37″N 84°20′49″W	Indian Hill	
88	United States Playing Card Company Complex	United States Playing Card Company Complex	June 30, 2015 (#15000044)	4590 Beech St. 39°09′32″N 84°26′33″W	Norwood	
89	Universalist Church Historic District	Universalist Church Historic District	December 2, 1970 (#70000498)	Montgomery Rd. from 9433 north to Remington Ave. 39°13′41″N 84°21′15″W	Montgomery	
90	Village Historic District	Village Historic District	August 25, 1986 (#86001626)	Roughly bounded by Wentworth Ave., the former B&O railroad tracks, E. Mills Ave., and Springfield Pike; 39°13′27″N 84°28′11″W	Wyoming	
91	Village of Addyston Historic District	Village of Addyston Historic District	September 13, 1991 (#91001388)	Roughly along Main, Sekitan, Church, 1st, and 2nd Sts., and the Three Rivers Parkway; 39°08′14″N 84°42′47″W	Addyston	
92	Waldschmidt-Camp Dennison District	Waldschmidt-Camp Dennison District	March 7, 1973 (#73001471)	7509 and 7567 Glendale-Milford Rd. in Camp Dennison; 39°11′28″N 84°17′26″W	Symmes Township	
93	John Aston Warder House	John Aston Warder House	May 19, 1978 (#78002084)	Between holes 10 and 11 of the Aston Oaks Golf Course, off Shady Lane east of central North Bend; 39°09′12″N 84°43′32″W	North Bend	Warder's gardens, now a golf course, contribute to the historic designation.
94	Washington Heights School	Washington Heights School	July 30, 1975 (#75001430)	8100 Given Rd. 39°12′11″N 84°19′26″W	Indian Hill	
95	James Whallon House	James Whallon House	May 17, 1973 (#73001473)	11000 Winton Rd. 39°16′17″N 84°31′20″W	Greenhills	
96	Whitewater Shaker Settlement	Whitewater Shaker Settlement	January 21, 1974 (#74001518)	11813, 11347, and 11081 Oxford Rd., north of New Haven; 39°17′40″N 84°44′34″W	Crosby Township	
97	Wilder-Swaim House	Wilder-Swaim House	May 20, 1981 (#81000438)	7650 Cooper Rd. 39°13′41″N 84°21′36″W	Montgomery	
98	W. L. Williams House	W. L. Williams House	March 25, 1977 (#77001066)	280 Anderson Ferry Rd. 39°05′18″N 84°37′06″W	Delhi Township	
99	Charles Woodruff House	Charles Woodruff House	August 25, 1986 (#86001651)	411 Springfield Pike; 39°13′32″N 84°28′27″W	Wyoming	
100	Wyoming Presbyterian Church	Wyoming Presbyterian Church	March 3, 1980 (#80003094)	Wyoming and Burns Aves. 39°13′36″N 84°28′06″W	Wyoming	
101	Yost Tavern	Yost Tavern	May 6, 1993 (#93000406)	7872 Cooper Rd. 39°13′36″N 84°21′15″W	Montgomery	

== See also ==
- List of National Historic Landmarks in Ohio
- Listings in neighboring counties: Boone (KY), Butler, Campbell (KY), Clermont, Dearborn (IN), Franklin (IN), Kenton (KY), Warren
- National Register of Historic Places listings in Ohio
