= Rennert Mound Archeological District =

Archaeological site in Ohio, United States

- U.S. National Register of Historic Places
- U.S. Historic district
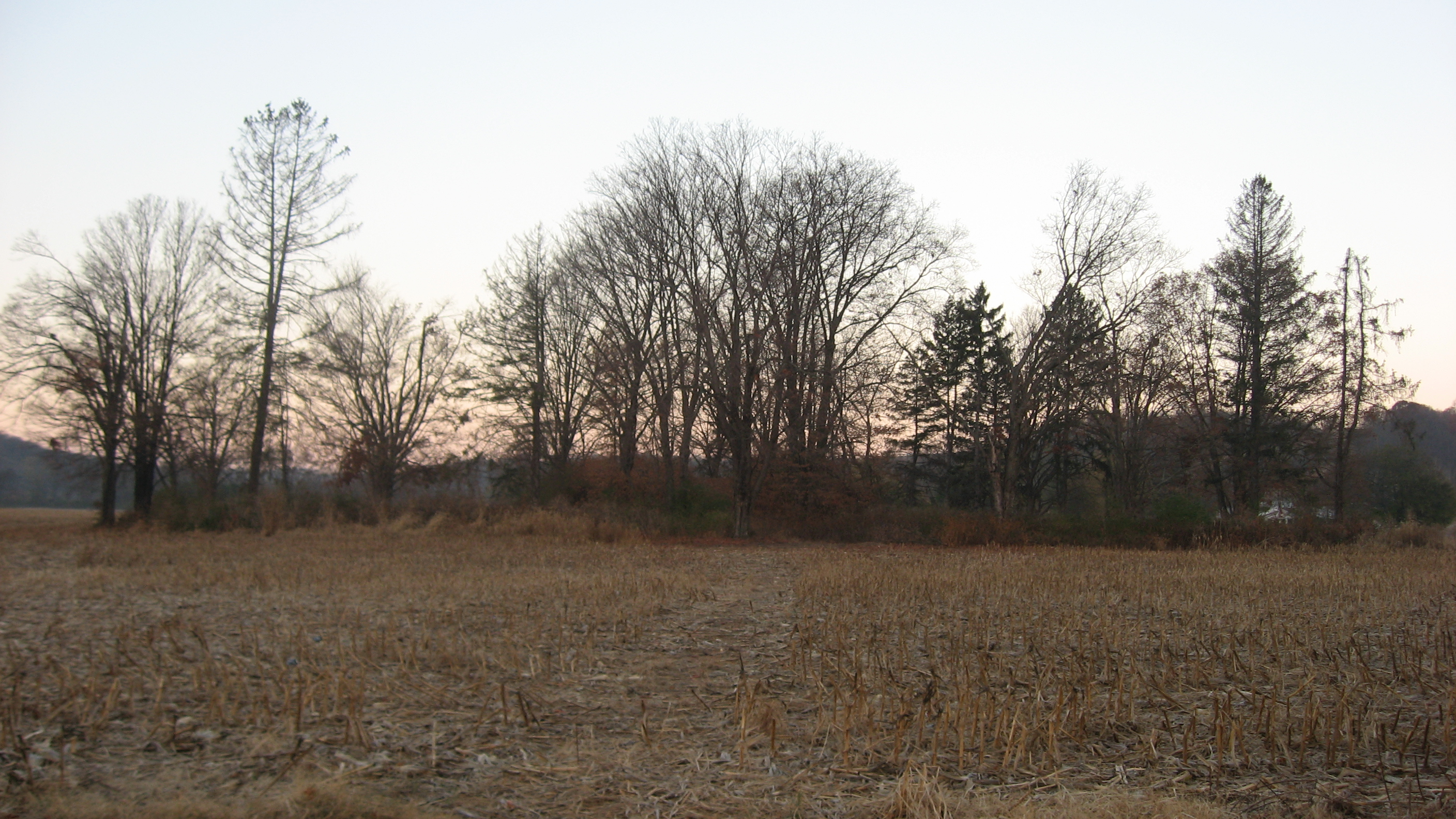
- Early morning view of the mound site

- Location within Ohio Location within the United States
- Location: West of Elizabethtown
- Nearest city: Elizabethtown, Ohio
- Coordinates: 39°9′34.2″N 84°48′30.4″W
- Area: 40 acres (16 ha)
- NRHP reference No.: 75001422
- Added to NRHP: March 4, 1975

The Rennert Mound Archeological District is a group of archaeological sites in the southwestern part of the U.S. state of Ohio. Located west of Elizabethtown in Hamilton County, the site is composed of one Native American mound and the remnants of two others, spread out over an area of 40 acres (16 ha).

The central part of the district is the Rennert Mound (also known as the "Minnie Rennert Mound"), which retains its original shape despite digging by locals in the past. Because the mound has never been excavated professionally, no significant artifacts have been recovered from it; consequently, the culture of the builders is unknown. The surrounding field has yielded plentiful lithic cores of white and tan chert, but too few cores have been found to justify classification of the fields as a village site. Due to its location and shape, the mound is believed to have been built by Adenan or Hopewellian peoples, both of which typically buried many bodies and large numbers of grave goods within mounds of this size. Another mound was once located approximately 90 feet (27 m) to the west, but it has been destroyed. The preservation of the one mound despite the destruction of the other is likely due to recent intervention: in the early twentieth century, landowner John Rennert planted trees all around this mound to preserve it, but he made no such efforts around the other mounds.

Three mounds once composed the Rennert complex, but neither of the others can be distinguished from the surrounding landscape; however, it is believed that an archaeological investigation might be able to discover their locations. Consequently, like the Rennert Mound, the bases of these two mounds are potential archaeological sites. Yet other sites have been found in the vicinity: a somewhat smaller mound tops a hill to the north, and the Wesley Butler Archeological District, composed of multiple mounds and a village site, lies just to the southwest. In 1975, the Rennert Mound and the sites of the two destroyed mounds were listed on the National Register of Historic Places for their archaeological significance.
