= Glendale Historic District (Glendale, Ohio) =

Historic district in Ohio, United States

- U.S. National Register of Historic Places
- U.S. National Historic Landmark District
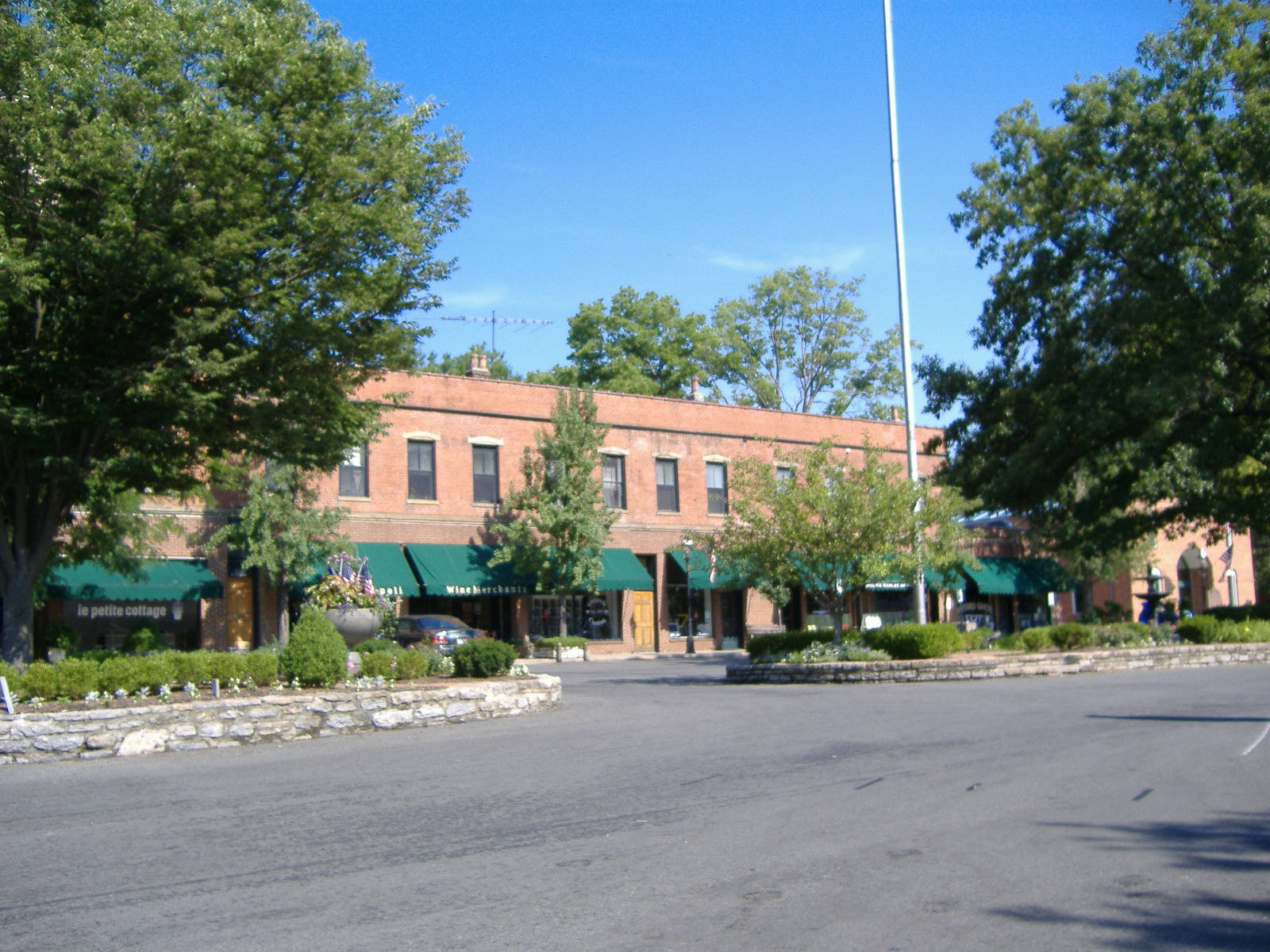

- Location within Ohio Location within the United States
- Location: SR 747, Glendale, Ohio
- Coordinates: 39°16′17″N 84°27′49″W
- Area: 392 acres (159 ha)
- Built: 1861
- Architect: Multiple
- Architectural style: Mid 19th Century Revival, Late Victorian and Late 19th and 20th Century Revivals
- NRHP reference No.: 76001447 (original); 100003285 (increase)

Significant dates
- Added to NRHP: July 20, 1976
- Boundary increase: December 18, 2018 (also includes decreases)
- Designated NHLD: May 5, 1977

The Glendale Historic District encompasses the historic core of Glendale, Ohio. Developed in 1851, Glendale is one of the earliest known examples of a planned residential village subdivision, its layout made using principles developed for rural cemeteries popular at the time. The district features shaded winding residential lanes, and a large assemblage of well-preserved period buildings. The district was designated a National Historic Landmark in 1977.

== Description and history ==
The village of Glendale is located in southwestern Ohio, about 15 miles (24 km) north of Cincinnati. Its historic core is an area of about 392 acres (159 ha), bounded roughly by Coral and Washington Avenues on the north, Springfield Pike (SR 4) on the west, Oak Street on the south, and South Troy Avenue on the east. South Troy parallels railroad tracks, and the village's business district basically straddles those tracks near Sharon Road. Congress Avenue is a major road passing through the district north from the junction of Springfield Pike and Oak Street. The area east of Congress Avenue is heavily residential, with winding roads and mature landscaping. There are two small parks in this area, both on East Fountain Avenue, which travels generally southwest to northeast. Houses in the district are mostly either Italianate or Second Empire, reflective of the village's development period in the 1850s. The railroad depot included in the district holds a museum of memorabilia of the village's past, including when John Hunt Morgan went through the village on his great raid.

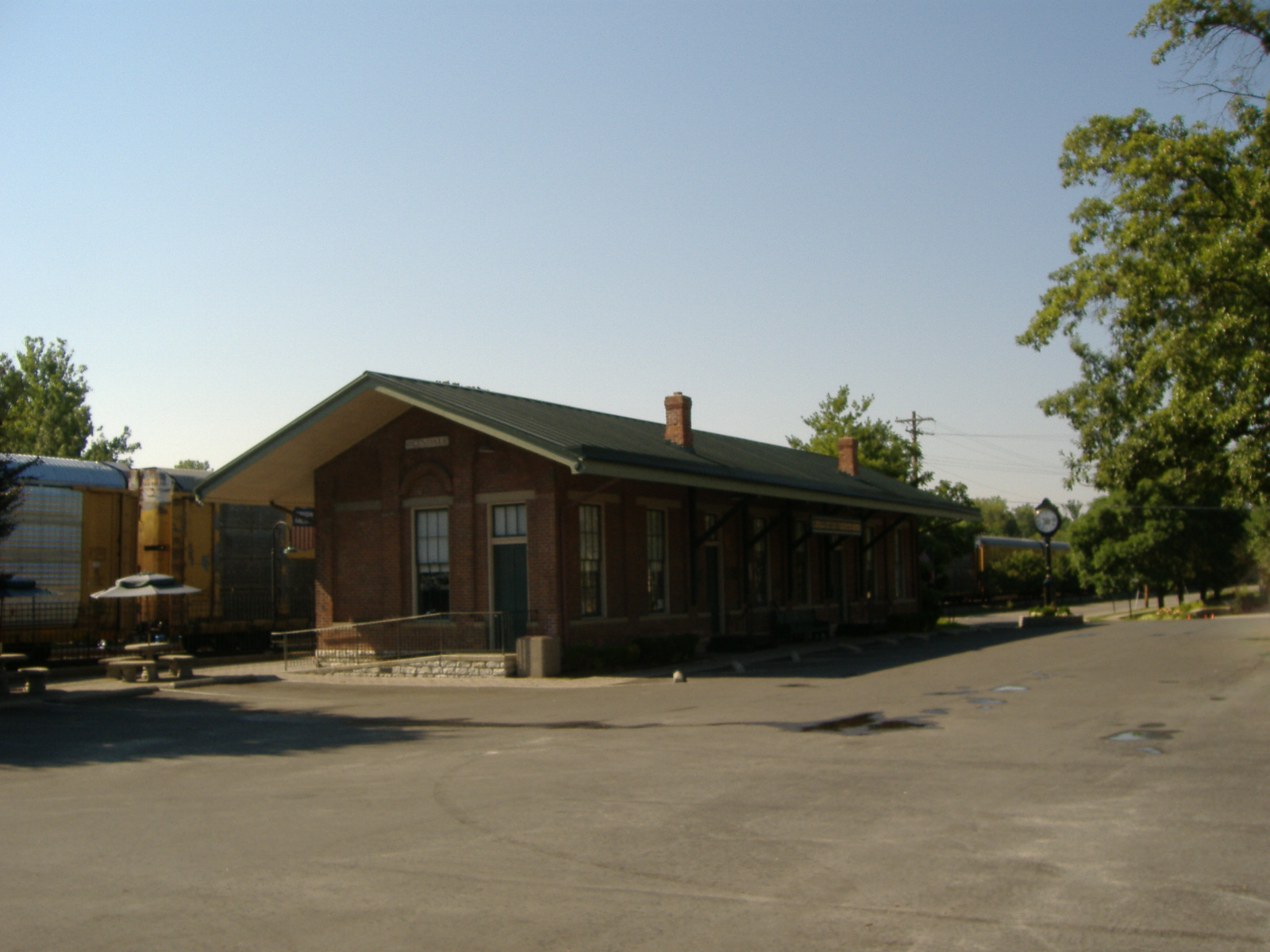
Historic railroad depot

Glendale was the brainchild of George Crawford and Henry Clark, two Ohio businessmen who saw the possibility of a suburban residential development along the railroad line of the Cincinnati, Hamilton and Dayton Railway. To that end, they ended up purchasing 600 acres (240 ha) on which Glendale was built. 200 acres (81 ha) were laid out by Robert Phillips, a civil engineer, and development proceeded once the railroad began running in 1851. The village streets were at first lit by coal oil lamps, which were upgraded by 1872 to natural gas; these fixtures are still used.

== See also ==
- List of National Historic Landmarks in Ohio
- National Register of Historic Places listings in Hamilton County, Ohio
