= Miller–Leuser Log House =

Historic house in Ohio, United States

- U.S. National Register of Historic Places
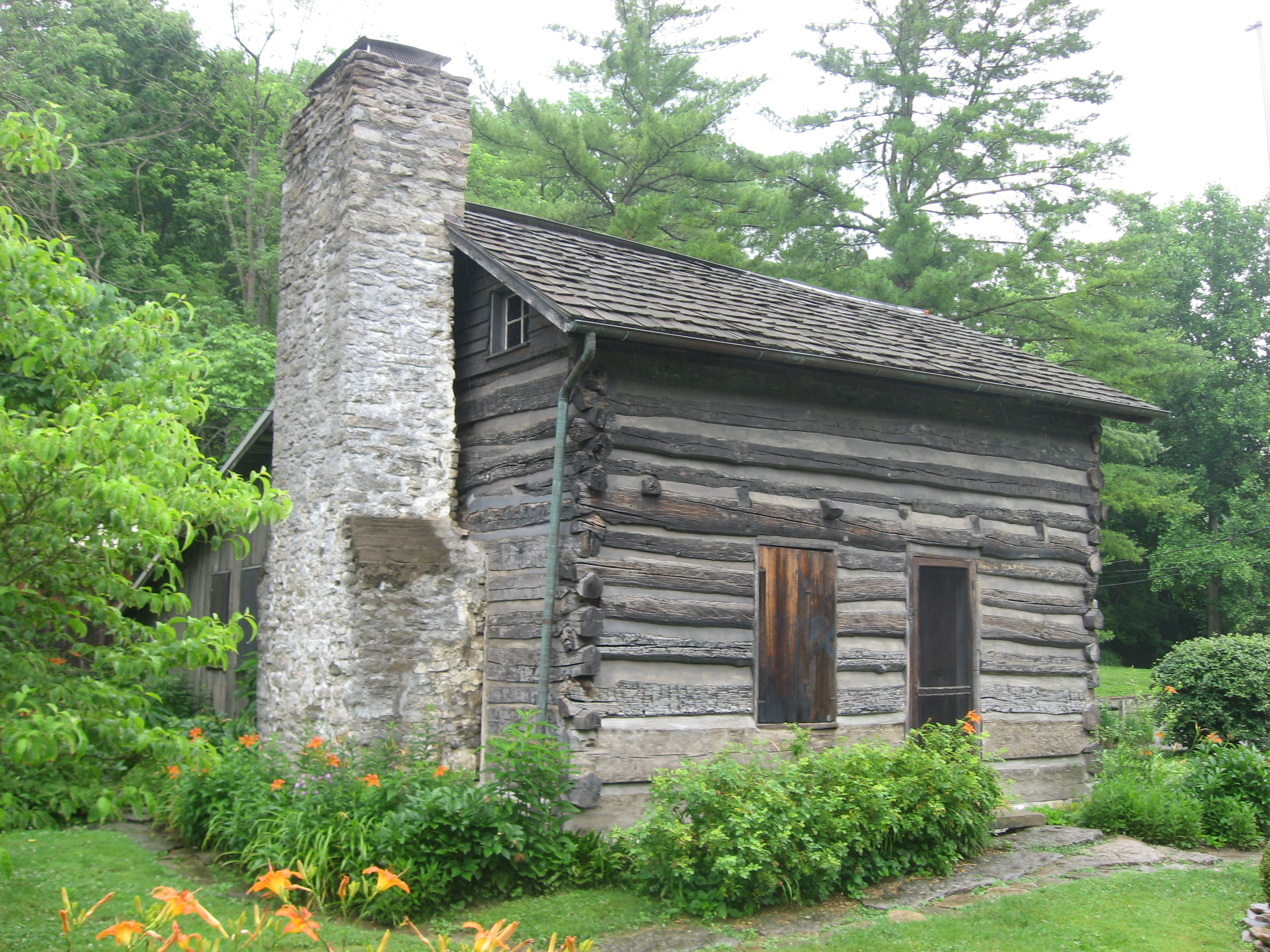
- Front and side of the house

- Location within Ohio Location within the United States
- Nearest city: Cincinnati, Ohio
- Coordinates: 39°6′6″N 84°22′7″W
- Area: Less than 1 acre (0.40 ha)
- Built: 1796
- NRHP reference No.: 74001511
- Added to NRHP: August 30, 1974

The Miller–Leuser Log House is a historic eighteenth-century log cabin near the city of Cincinnati in Hamilton County, Ohio, United States. One of the oldest houses in the area, it has been named a historic site.

When Columbia was founded in 1788 as Hamilton County's first settlement, the pioneers spread out as far upriver as today's Anderson Township. Land in the township, including the location of the Miller–Leuser House, was surveyed five years later as part of a general survey of the Virginia Military District. In 1796, explorer Nathaniel Massie purchased the site of the present house and quickly devised it to Ichabod Miller; he is believed to have constructed the house by the end of the year, and he retained ownership until selling it in 1836. The cabin remained in residential use until 1971, when it was bought by the Anderson Township Historical Society; as one of the oldest buildings in southwestern Ohio, and as a typical component of the pioneer built environment, locals deemed it a highly significant part of their history.

In building his house, Ichabod Miller employed a mix of logs: some were hand-hewn, while others retained their original round shape, and all are notched to enable them to fit together at the corners. The entire building is one and one half stories tall.

In 1974, the Miller–Leuser Log House was listed on the National Register of Historic Places, one of more than three hundred such locations in Hamilton County. It qualified for inclusion primarily because of its architecture, rather than because of its place in local history. The house is one of twelve National Register locations in Anderson Township, along with one house in the Mount Washington neighborhood of Cincinnati, three sites in the village of Newtown, and seven other places in the unincorporated portions of the township.
