= Roudebush Farm =

Historic house in Ohio, United States

- U.S. National Register of Historic Places
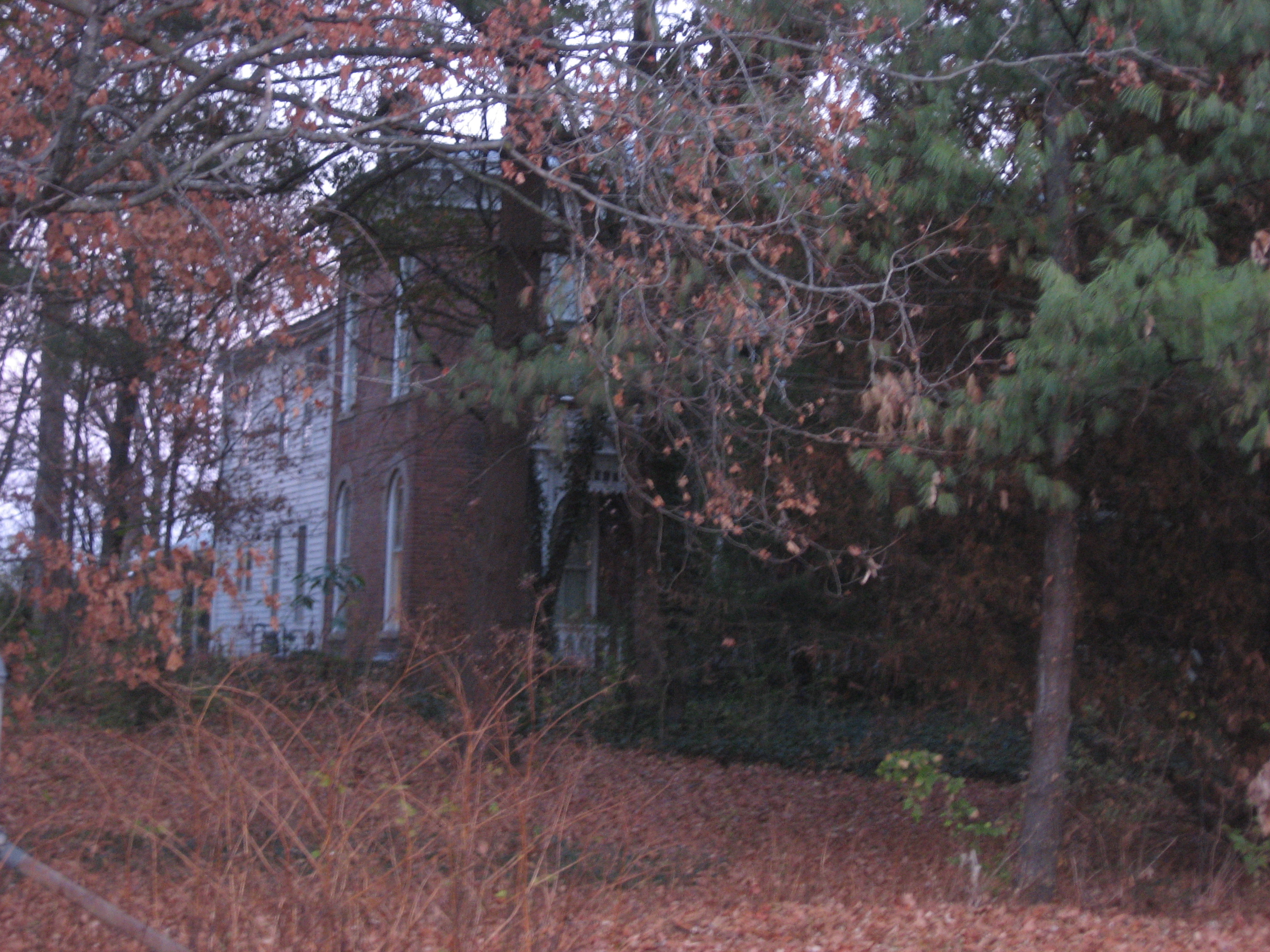
- House at the Roudebush Farm

- Location within Ohio Location within the United States
- Location: 8643 Kilby Road, Harrison Township, Hamilton County, Ohio
- Nearest city: Harrison
- Coordinates: 39°14′10″N 84°47′1″W
- Area: 9 acres (3.6 ha)
- Built: 1859
- Architect: Hammand Roudebush
- NRHP reference No.: 76001449
- Added to NRHP: June 17, 1976

Roudebush Farm is a historic farmstead located southeast of Harrison in northwestern Hamilton County, Ohio, United States. It was established in the 1850s with the construction of a small frame residence. This building, the original farmhouse, was built just one story tall and composed of two rooms. The builder was the farm's namesake, Hammand Hersh Roudebush.

A native of Adams County in southeastern Pennsylvania, Roudebush and his parents settled in Ohio in 1834 when he was just four years old. Twenty-five years later, he and his wife Emeline bought a Harrison-area property known as "Sand Hill" and settled there; this became the present Roudebush Farm. After completing the original farmhouse and barn in the same year, the Roudebushes became prosperous enough to expand their buildings, and accordingly they expanded the house greatly in 1870. No longer was the house simply a small frame structure: the addition is built of brick with many ornate Italianate details and multiple fine porches. Among the most distinctive elements of the house is its elaborate formal parlor, which retains the furniture, silk wallpaper, and carpet with which it was furnished in 1875.

In 1976, the Roudebush Farm was listed on the National Register of Historic Places, qualifying because of its historically significant architecture. Four contributing properties are included within the 9 acres (3.6 ha) of property designated as historic, including the farmhouse, the barn, and a schoolhouse, although the schoolhouse is no longer used for educational purposes.
