= Mathew Mound =

Archaeological site in Ohio, United States

- U.S. National Register of Historic Places
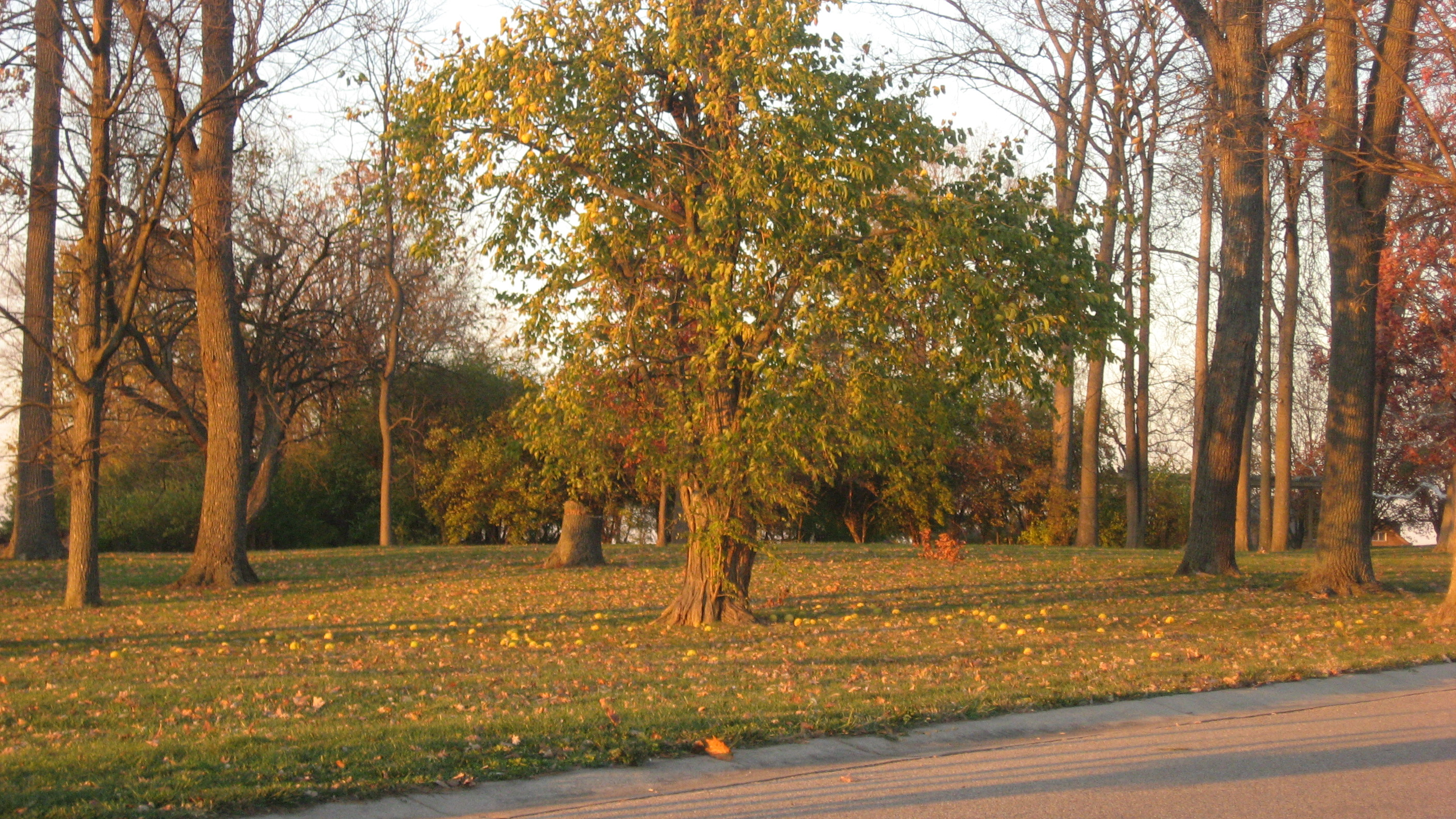
- View from the south

- Location within Ohio Location within the United States
- Location: Atop the hill on the northern side of Oak Rd., Glendale, Ohio
- Coordinates: 39°15′44.5″N 84°26′33.5″W
- Area: 5 acres (2.0 ha)
- NRHP reference No.: 75001424
- Added to NRHP: May 29, 1975

The Mathew Mound (designated 33-HA-122) is a Native American mound in the southwestern part of the U.S. state of Ohio. Located off Oak Road near the village of Evendale, the mound is believed to have been built by members of the Adena or Hopewell peoples during the Woodland period.

For many years, local legend held that the mound was the burial site of a historic Native American known as "Opekasit"; the legend lent itself to the milk-processing operation run by the mound's owners, which was known for many years as the Opekasit Dairy. The mound is 4.5 feet (1.4 m) high with a diameter of slightly more than 60 feet (18 m). Having never been excavated, it is a prime example of a burial mound from the Woodland period. Based on the excavation of similar mounds, it is expected that the Mathew Mound contains evidence of funerary practices such as grave goods and the remains of buried bodies. It is one of two archaeological sites in the vicinity: the other, a small campsite designated 33-HA-125, is a small fraction of a mile west of the mound, but excavation yielded nothing significant. Because the mound is a potentially valuable archaeological site, it was listed on the National Register of Historic Places in 1975.
