= Jacob Bromwell House =

Historic house in Ohio, United States

- U.S. National Register of Historic Places
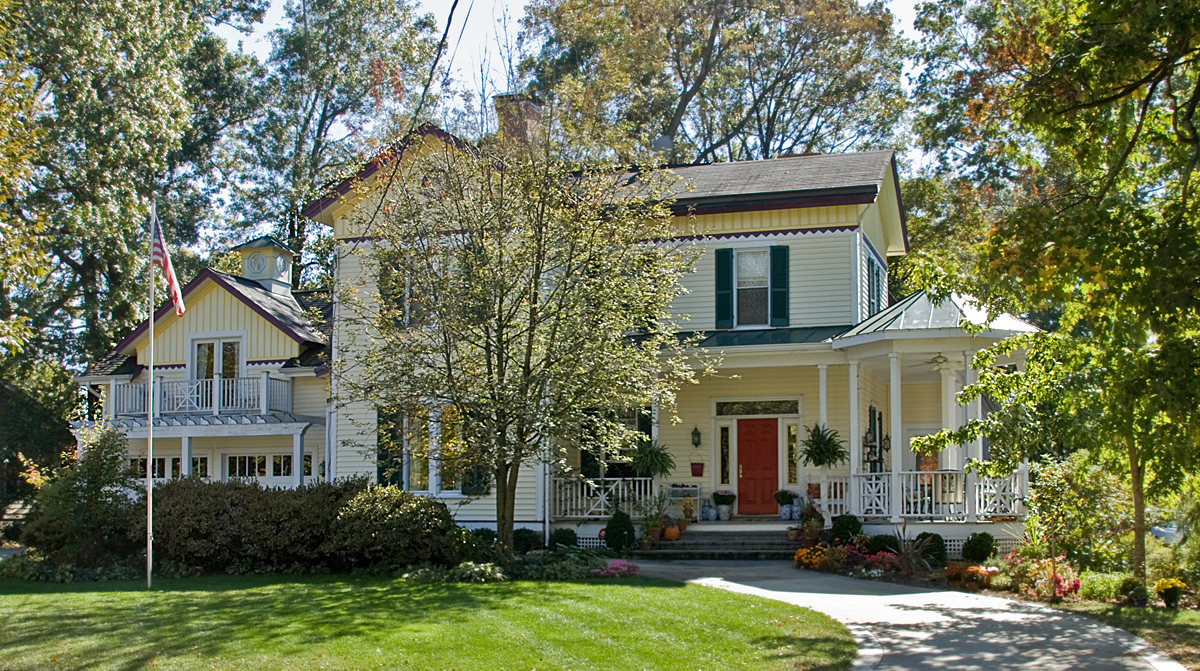
- Front of the house

- Location within Ohio Location within the United States
- Location: 69 Mt. Pleasant Ave., Wyoming, Ohio
- Coordinates: 39°13′24″N 84°28′34″W
- Area: 0.5 acres (0.20 ha)
- Built: 1876
- Architectural style: Italianate
- MPS: Wyoming MRA
- NRHP reference No.: 86001629
- Added to NRHP: August 25, 1986

The Jacob Bromwell House is a historic residence in the city of Wyoming, Ohio, United States. An Italianate house constructed in the late nineteenth century, it was originally the home of a U.S. Representative, and it has been designated a historic site.

== Jacob Bromwell ==
Jacob H. Bromwell was among the most prominent politicians in Wyoming's history. Besides serving as a lawyer and a professor, he held office as the city solicitor, as a common pleas court judge (1907-1913), and as Wyoming's mayor (1880-1886). He was elected as a Republican Party to the United States House of Representatives, beginning with a special election in 1894 and continuing in office until 1903. The present house was built in 1876, while Bromwell was teaching in the public schools of southern Indiana and Cincinnati.

== Historic context ==
Good transportation is a leading reason for Wyoming's prosperity. The city lies near the old pre-statehood road that connected Cincinnati with locations farther north, such as Fort Hamilton and Fallen Timbers. Curves in the road were cut off in 1806, forming a new road that is today followed by Springfield Pike through central Wyoming. Improvements in the 1830s only enhanced its importance. By this time, another mode of transportation had become significant: the Miami and Erie Canal was built a short distance to the east in 1828, and the village of Lockland grew up along its side. Railroads reached the city in 1851 with the construction of the Cincinnati, Hamilton, and Dayton Railroad on the border between Lockland and Wyoming.

Because of Wyoming's proximity to the industry of Lockland, its easy transportation to the booming city of Cincinnati, and its pleasant scenery, many wealthy industrialists purchased local farms and built grand country houses. Most such houses were built in the Wyoming Hills area, west of Springfield Pike; growth in this area continued until the coming of the Great Depression. Bromwell was typical of these rich industrialists, building a large house and commuting to Cincinnati daily.

== Architecture ==
Two stories tall, the Italianate Bromwell House is built in the shape of the letter "L". The walls are weatherboarded, built on a stone foundation and covered with an asphalt roof. Among the house's details are shutters on many of the windows, a side bay window, and an oculus in a gable on the front. Matching porches are placed on the front and rear of the house, featuring chamfered and bracketed pillars and a bracketed cornice.

== Recognition ==
In 1979, a local historic preservation group began a citywide survey to identify Wyoming's historic buildings, and this effort culminated with a multiple property submission of eighteen houses, the Wyoming Presbyterian Church, and one historic district to the National Register of Historic Places in 1985. Along with all but one of the other properties, the Jacob Bromwell House was listed on the Register in the following year, qualifying because of its historically significant architecture and its place as the home of a leading local citizen.
