= W. L. Williams House =

Historic house in Ohio, United States

- U.S. National Register of Historic Places
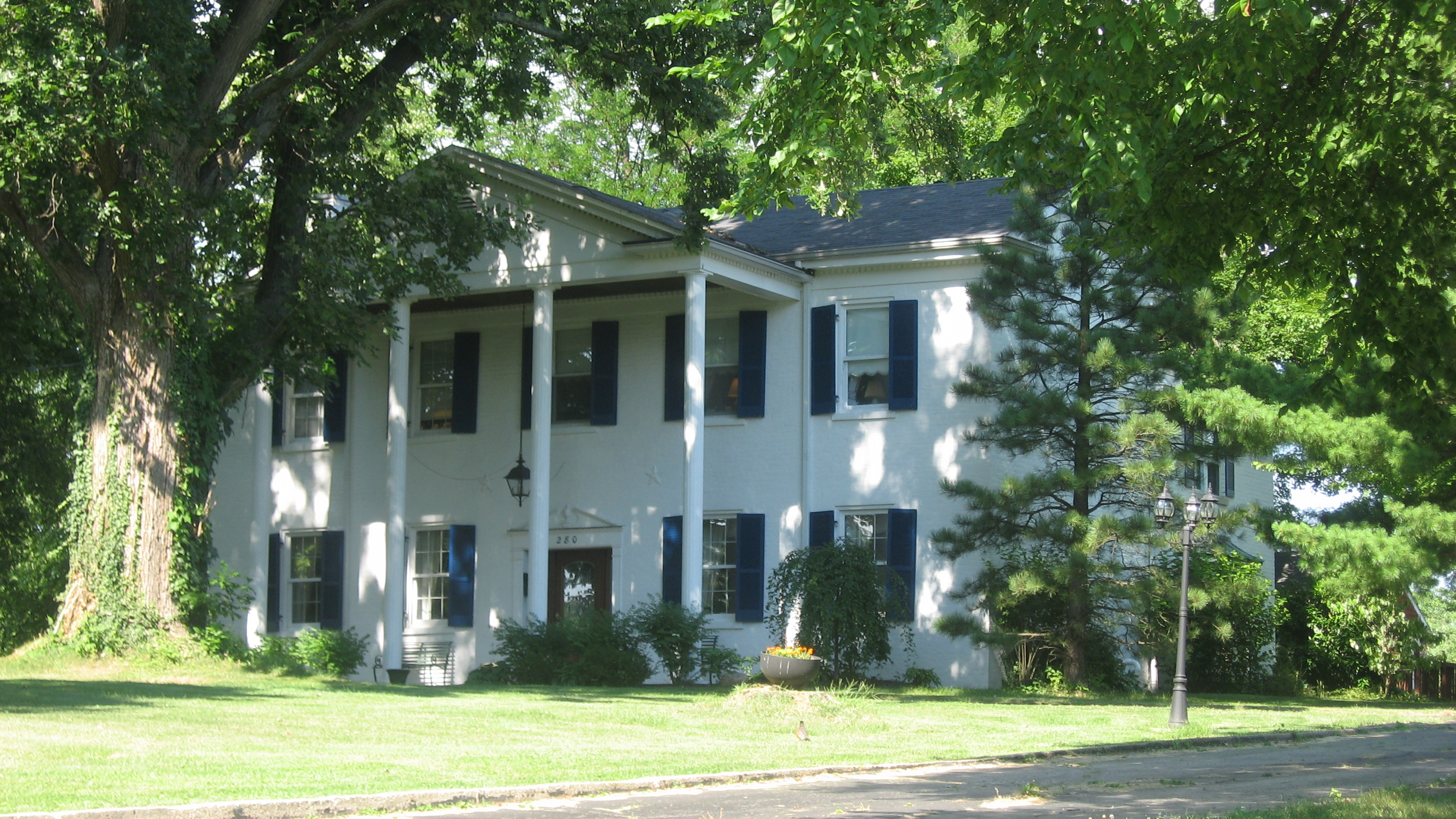
- Front and southern side of the house

- Location within Ohio Location within the United States
- Location: 280 Anderson Ferry Road, Delhi Township, Hamilton County, Ohio, United States
- Coordinates: 39°5′17.52″N 84°37′7.47″W
- Architect: W. L. Williams
- NRHP reference No.: 77001066
- Added to NRHP: March 25, 1977

W. L. Williams House is a registered historic building near Cincinnati, Ohio, listed in the National Register on March 25, 1977.

== Historic uses ==
- Single Dwelling
