= Smith–Jessup House =

Historic house in Ohio, United States

- U.S. National Register of Historic Places
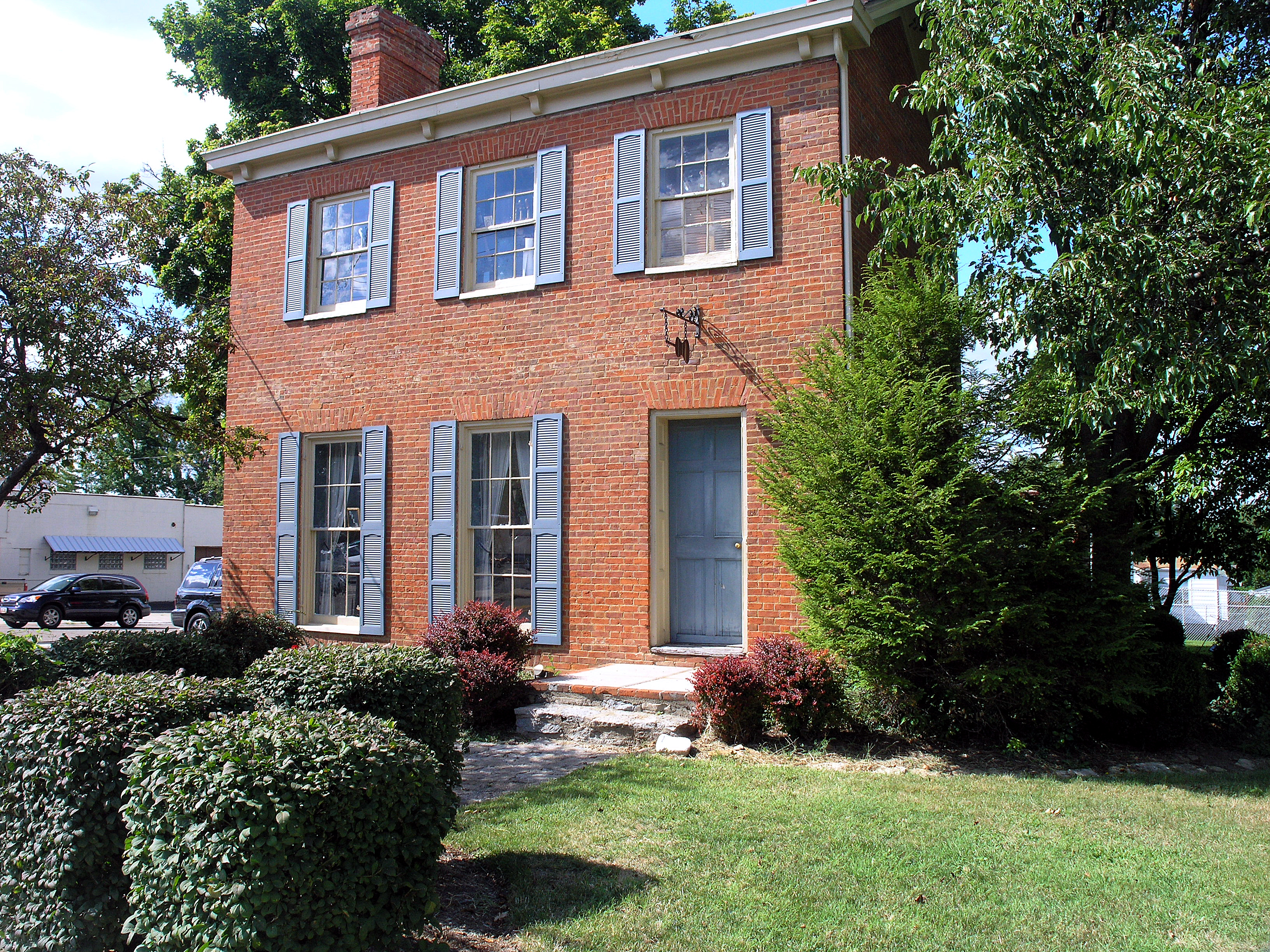
- Front of the house

- Location within Ohio Location within the United States
- Location: 1038 W. North Bend Rd., Springfield Township, Hamilton County, Ohio
- Coordinates: 39°12′7″N 84°31′47″W
- Area: less than one acre
- Built: 1825
- Architectural style: Federal
- NRHP reference No.: 84003717
- Added to NRHP: August 23, 1984

The Smith–Jessup House is a historic house at 1038 W. North Bend Road in Springfield Township, Hamilton County, Ohio. Daniel Smith built the house circa 1825. Farmer David Jessup bought the house in the 1830s and lived there for much of the 19th century. The Federal Style house is an uncommon example of the style in unincorporated Springfield Township. The 2 1/2-story brick house features a three-bay front facade, a wooden frieze, and a gable roof.

The house was listed in the National Register on August 23, 1984.
