= John Tangeman House =

Historic house in Ohio, United States

- U.S. National Register of Historic Places
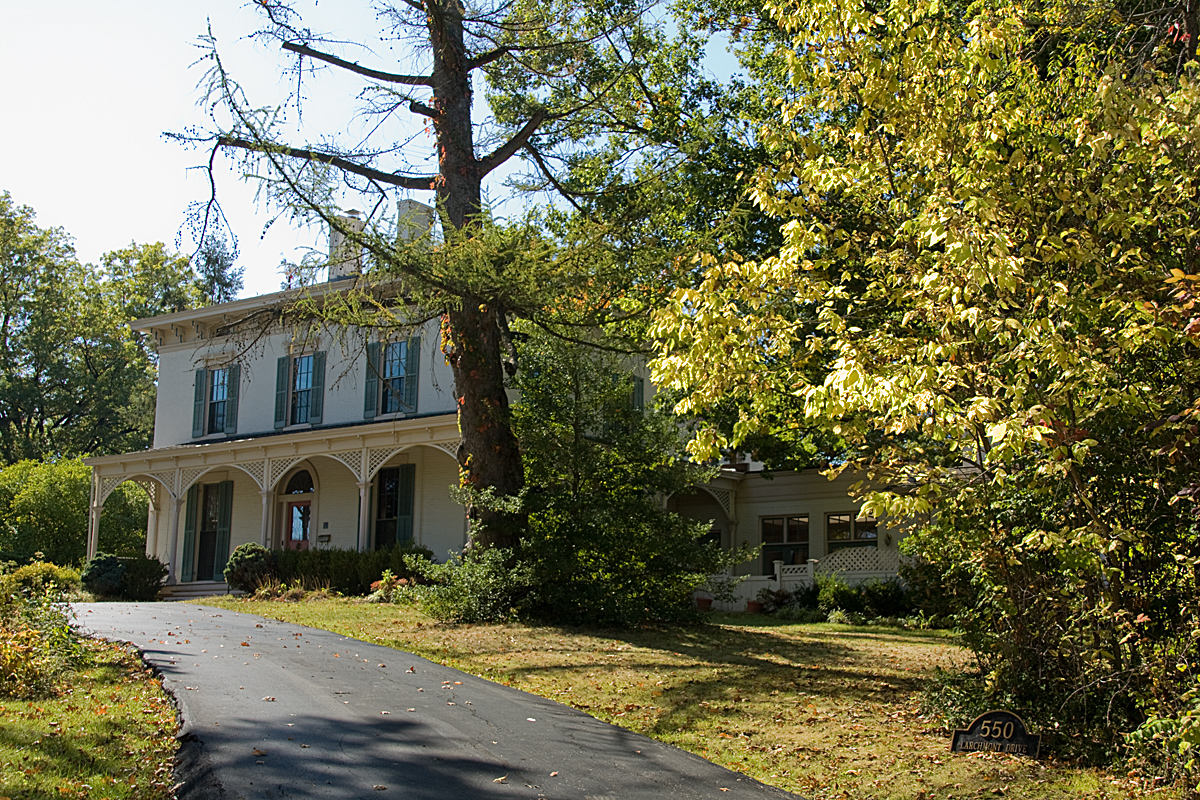
- View from the street, looking up the driveway

- Location within Ohio Location within the United States
- Location: 550 Larchmont, Wyoming, Ohio
- Coordinates: 39°13′40″N 84°28′33″W
- Area: Less than 1 acre (0.40 ha)
- Built: 1857
- Architectural style: Italianate
- MPS: Wyoming MRA
- NRHP reference No.: 86001650
- Added to NRHP: August 25, 1986

The John Tangeman House is a historic house in the city of Wyoming, Ohio, United States. The city's best house of its style, the residence was once home to a prosperous factory owner, and it has been named a historic site.

== Architecture ==
As Wyoming's best Italianate residence, the Tangeman House conveys a clear picture of pre-Civil War Wyoming, especially when seen from the front. Built of brick on a stone foundation, the two-story house is covered with an asphalt roof and features additional elements of wood and stone. A large front porch surrounds the entrance and the rest of the three-bay facade. Decorative corbelling supports the edges of the roof, which features twin chimneys near its center; it has the overall shape of a hip roof. Significant elements of the porch include the chamfered pillars, decorative molding, and arches with elaborate latticework.

== Historic context ==
Good transportation is a leading reason for Wyoming's prosperity. The city lies near the old pre-statehood road that connected Cincinnati with locations farther north, such as Fort Hamilton and Fallen Timbers. Curves in the road were cut off in 1806, forming a new road that is today followed by Springfield Pike through central Wyoming. Improvements in the 1830s only enhanced its importance. By this time, another mode of transportation had become significant: the Miami and Erie Canal was built a short distance to the east in 1828, and the village of Lockland grew up along its side. Railroads reached the city in 1851 with the construction of the Cincinnati, Hamilton, and Dayton Railroad on the border between Lockland and Wyoming.

Because of Wyoming's proximity to the industry of Lockland, its easy transportation to the booming city of Cincinnati, and its pleasant scenery, many wealthy industrialists purchased local farms and built grand country houses. Most such houses were built in the Wyoming Hills area, west of Springfield Pike; growth in this area continued until the coming of the Great Depression. As the owner of the Tangeman Paper Company in Lockland, John Tangeman was among the first industrialists to build a house in Wyoming. He resided on the property for more than thirty years, beginning at its completion in 1857 and continuing until 1891 at least.

== Historic site ==
In 1979, a local historic preservation group began a citywide survey to identify Wyoming's historic buildings, and this effort culminated with a multiple property submission of eighteen houses, the Wyoming Presbyterian Church, and one historic district to the National Register of Historic Places in 1985. Along with all but one of the other properties, the Tangeman House was listed on the Register in the following year, qualifying because of its historically significant architecture and because of its connection to Tangeman.
