= Charles Woodruff House (Wyoming, Ohio) =

Historic house in Ohio, United States

- U.S. National Register of Historic Places
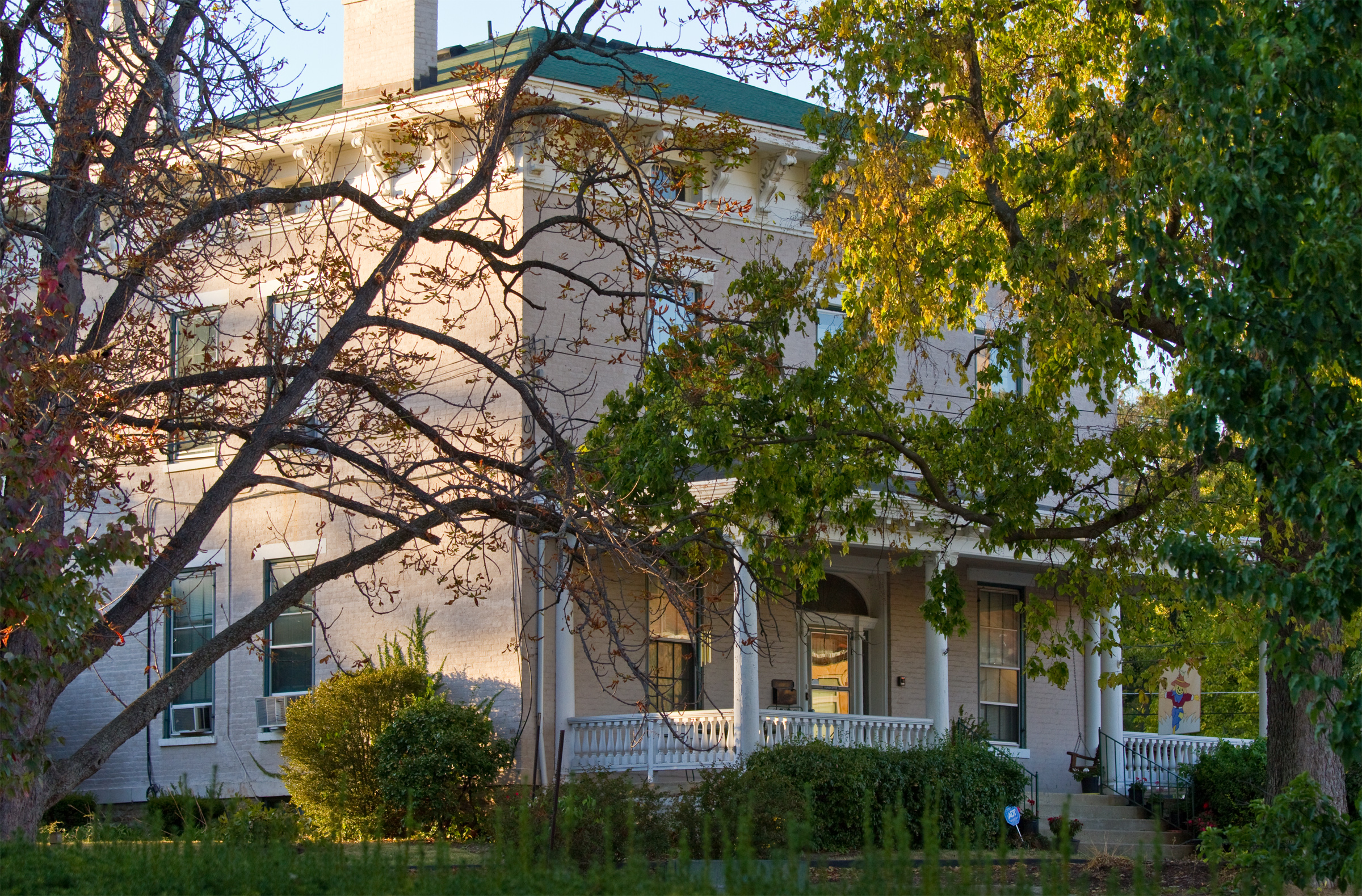

- Location within Ohio Location within the United States
- Location: 411 Springfield Pike, Wyoming, Ohio
- Coordinates: 39°13′31.8″N 84°28′27.3″W
- Area: 0.8 acres (0.32 ha)
- Built: 1855
- Architectural style: Italianate
- MPS: Wyoming MRA
- NRHP reference No.: 86001651
- Added to NRHP: August 25, 1986

Charles Woodruff House is a historic building in Wyoming, Ohio, United States. It was listed on the National Register of Historic Places on August 25, 1986.

== Historic uses ==
- Single dwelling
