= Wesley Butler Archeological District =

Archaeological site in Ohio, United States

- U.S. National Register of Historic Places
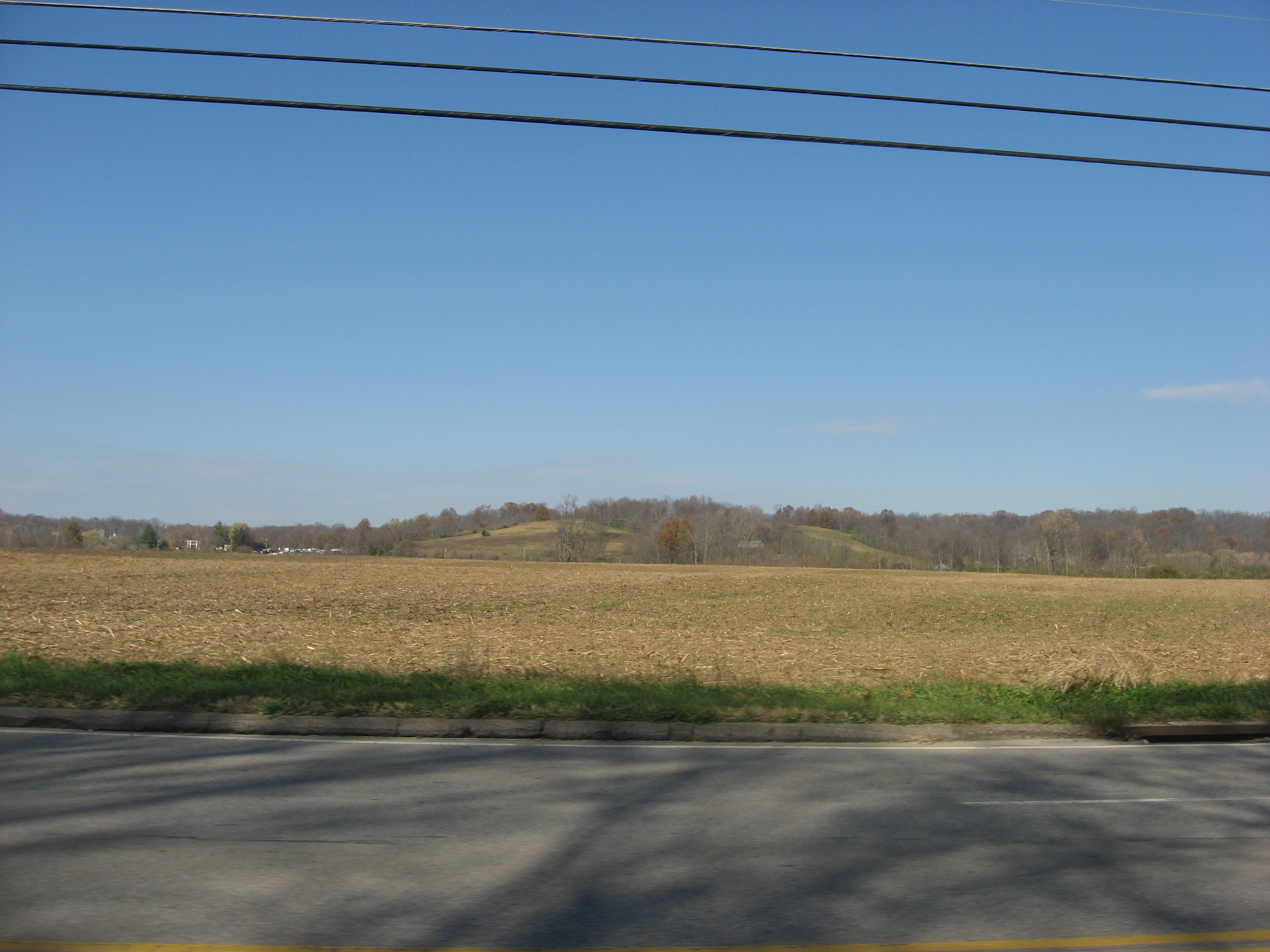
- A field in the district

- Location within Ohio Location within the United States
- Location: Off U.S. Route 50 southwest of Elizabethtown
- Nearest city: Elizabethtown, Ohio
- Coordinates: 39°9′16″N 84°48′48″W
- Area: 30 acres (12 ha)
- NRHP reference No.: 76001446
- Added to NRHP: July 24, 1976

The Wesley Butler Archeological District (designated 33HA249) is a historic district composed of a group of archaeological sites in the southwestern corner of the U.S. state of Ohio. Located south of Elizabethtown, the district comprises three Native American mounds and the site of a Native American village, spread out over an area of 40 acres (16 ha). Although the mounds are built atop part of the village site, they are not contemporaneous: the mounds were built by Woodland peoples, but the village dates from the far older Archaic period.

In the late 1950s, an archaeological field survey visited the site repeatedly. Comparatively few artifacts were found: only scrapers, an axe, and tiny projectile points were found, all in tiny numbers, although numerous pieces of chert were discovered with evidence that humans had worked them. The survey found absolutely no pottery whatsoever, confusing the surveyors and leading them to suggest that the mounds and the village site had been the result of separate occupations of the same location.

The western portion of Hamilton County contains many archaeological sites, due primarily to its favorable terrain. The area is well watered by the Ohio and Miami Rivers; consequently, prior to white settlement of the region, there were large amounts of game, and edible plants could be found in large numbers. For this reason, the Wesley Butler site has been inhabited for at least six thousand years. In recognition of the district's archaeological value, it was listed on the National Register of Historic Places in 1976.
