= Professor William Pabodie House =

Historic house in Ohio, United States

- U.S. National Register of Historic Places
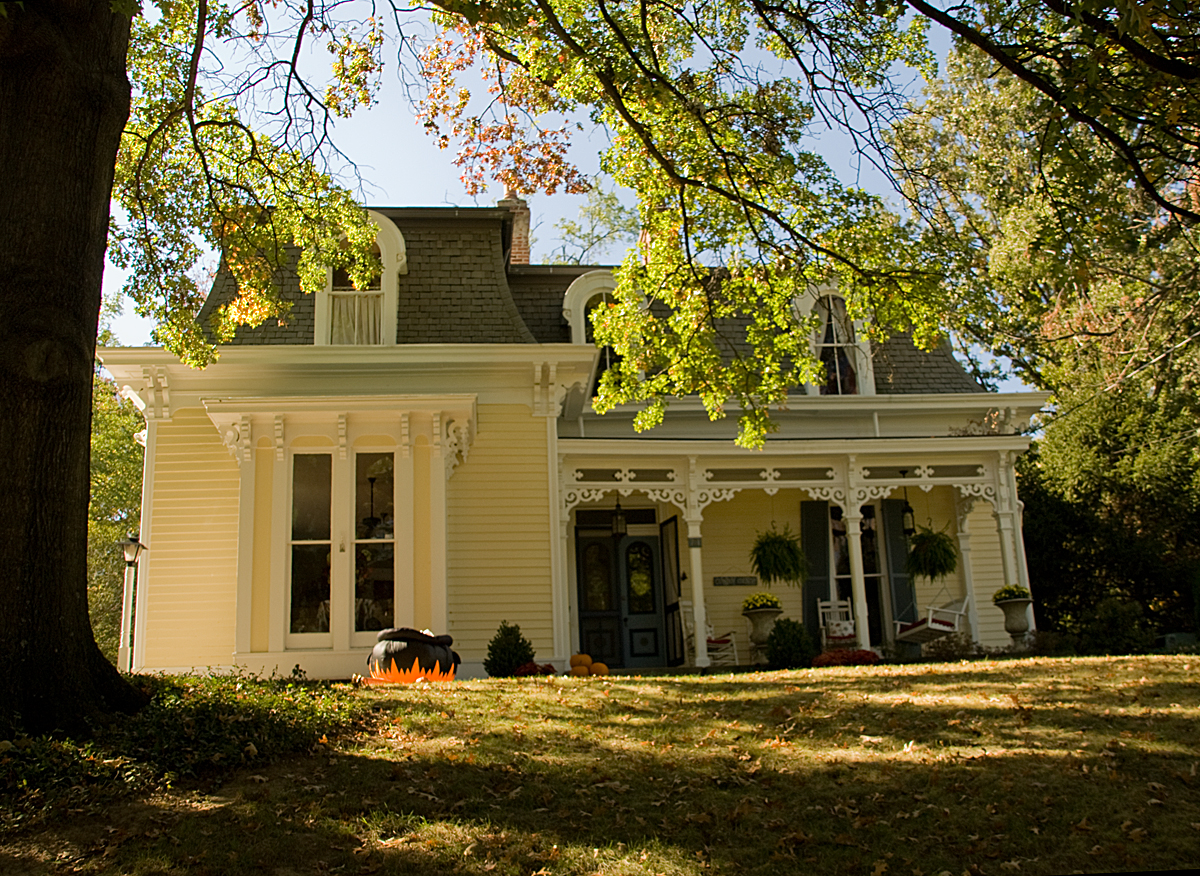
- Front of the house

- Location within Ohio Location within the United States
- Location: 731 Brooks Ave., Wyoming, Ohio
- Coordinates: 39°13′52″N 84°28′35″W
- Area: 0.3 acres (0.12 ha)
- Built: 1870
- Architectural style: Second Empire
- MPS: Wyoming MRA
- NRHP reference No.: 86001638
- Added to NRHP: August 25, 1986

The Professor William Pabodie House is a historic residence in the city of Wyoming, Ohio, United States. Erected in the late nineteenth century, it was originally the home of a Cincinnati-area educator, and it has been designated a historic site because of its distinctive architecture.

== Architecture ==
Built of wood on a stone foundation, the one-and-one-half-story Pabodie House is Wyoming's only pure Second Empire house. The facade features a central rectangular doorway with double doors and double semicircular transom lights. Virtually no changes have been made to the house since its completion in 1870, making it one of the best preserved Second Empire cottages in the region.

== Historic context ==
Good transportation is a leading reason for Wyoming's prosperity. The city lies near the old pre-statehood road that connected Cincinnati with locations farther north, such as Fort Hamilton and Fallen Timbers. Curves in the road were cut off in 1806, forming a new road that is today followed by Springfield Pike through central Wyoming. Improvements in the 1830s only enhanced its importance. By this time, another mode of transportation had become significant: the Miami and Erie Canal was built a short distance to the east in 1828, and the village of Lockland grew up along its side. Railroads reached the city in 1851 with the construction of the Cincinnati, Hamilton, and Dayton Railroad on the border between Lockland and Wyoming.

Because of Wyoming's proximity to the industry of Lockland, its easy transportation to the booming city of Cincinnati, and its pleasant scenery, many wealthy industrialists purchased local farms and built grand country houses. Most such houses were built in the Wyoming Hills area, west of Springfield Pike; growth in this area continued until the coming of the Great Depression. William Pabodie was himself not a businessman; a faculty member for Cincinnati Public Schools, he taught mathematics at the old Woodward High School in Over-the-Rhine for many years. His house is one of at least seven significant Wyoming residences with clear connections to the history of Cincinnati.

== Historic site ==
In 1979, a local historic preservation group began a citywide survey to identify Wyoming's historic buildings, and this effort culminated with a multiple property submission of eighteen houses, the Wyoming Presbyterian Church, and one historic district to the National Register of Historic Places in 1985. Along with all but one of the other properties, the Pabodie House was listed on the Register in the following year, qualifying because of its historically significant architecture.
