= Pine Meer =

Historic house in Ohio, United States

- U.S. National Register of Historic Places
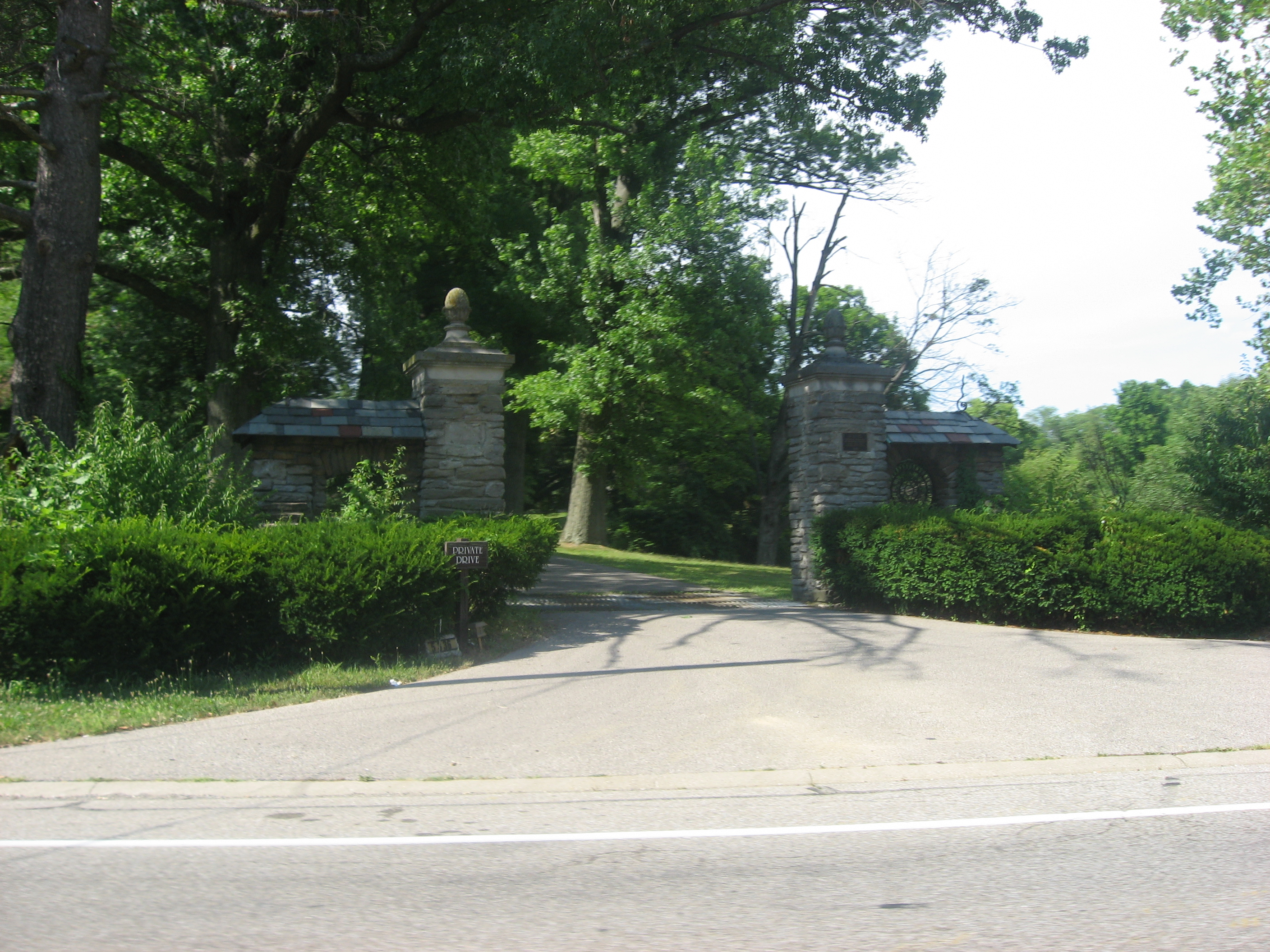
- Entrance to the house's long driveway

- Location within Ohio Location within the United States
- Location: 5336 Cleves-Warsaw Road, Cincinnati, Ohio
- Coordinates: 39°7′13″N 84°37′4″W
- Area: 5.1 acres (2.1 ha)
- Built: 1926
- Architectural style: Tudor Revival
- NRHP reference No.: 82001468
- Added to NRHP: November 30, 1982

Pine Meer, built in 1922–1924, is a historic site located in Green Township, Hamilton County, Ohio, United States. It received national exposure when it was the subject of a reality series that aired on TBS in late 2004 known as The Mansion. In reference to the original owners, the property is known locally as the "Schott Estate." Its address is 5336 Cleves Warsaw Road, Cincinnati, Ohio.

== Architecture ==
Pine Meer was built for William Charles (Wm. C.) and Lucia Riedlin Schott. The buildings were designed by the firm of Rendigs, Panzer and Martin, one of Cincinnati's leading architectural firms during the second quarter of the 20th century. The main house "is a distinctive example of the Tudor Revival architecture embodying the architectural details associated with the style. It is characterized by its random ashlar stone and half timber stucco wall treatment, multi-paned and grouped window treatments, decorative sandstone trim, large wall dormers and gable ends, Tudor arch detail, polychromic slate roof and decorative chimney treatment." A unique feature of the home is the front terrace onto which the primary rooms on the first floor open. The main entry doors, opposite the side fronting the pond and street, were set back through a rather low cabled porch to set itself apart from the nearby service entrance. (During the TBS show "The Mansion" this entrance was modified and brought forward by enclosing the porch area.) Situated behind the main house is a carriage house, which has similar rough-stone as the main house on the first floor, but includes yellow brick on the sides and rear. It is dramatized by a pair of acutely angled gables at the ends along with vivid half-timbered patters. This structure contained a four car garage adjacent to a visi-bowl gas pump on the ground level and a servants quarter on the upper level. The lower rear level served as a barn with stalls to house animals, facing what was formerly fenced pastureland, and equipment/workshop rooms.

The interior architectural detail of the main house "further articulates the Tudor Revival style through the use of Tudor arched doorways and fireplaces, Tudor and Jacobethan ceiling detail and paneled wall treatments." It originally had 13 rooms, and 4.5 bathrooms, including a "sunken" music room, which enlarged the ceiling heights, with a built-in organ that could play music scrolls. There was also a screened bedroom porch off the main bedroom. (But it was enclosed by a later owner.) The house also contained a large attic, adjacent to the former servants quarters, with shed-roof dormers as well as a basement with laundry room, card room and wine cellar. The driveway entrance is flanked by rough-stone gateposts topped by carved pineapples, which in turn are flanked by shorter stone piers connected by horizontal slate "rooflets" over curved arches with wrought-iron grills. There was a bench and brass plaque that said "Pine Meer" on the left gate post and a plaque that said Wm. C. Schott on the right gate post. The long driveway branches into a circle between the two buildings along with a drive extending to the back of the carriage house.

== Grounds & Landscaping ==
Originally a farmstead with nearly 100 acres, the property was developed into a "Gentleman's farm", reminiscent of English country houses. The pastures were primarily used for cattle, pigs and a horse, but there was some sharecropping with some of the acreage. The main house lies on a hill rising gently in front of a "u" shaped pond. It once had a small boat dock at one end, an island for swan nesting at the other end and a fountain lying below the surface in the center. The pond had an underwater spring, was stocked with largemouth bass, contained waterfowl and was designed with a decorative stone overspill that drained excess water under the frontage road. Most of the acreage was in fenced pastures, but the homestead was surrounded by a formal garden, a vegetable garden and a rose garden. The Schott's had a great appreciation for trees and plants. The grounds were professionally landscaped including a flower garden with a seated trellis, a quaint bridge over a stone laid creek-bed and a stone staircase off the music room's veranda that lead to the formal garden with a stone trimmed swimming pool and fountain. (The original pool and formal gardens were removed and replaced with a larger pool by a more recent owner.) Hundreds of trees were planted, consisting of over 50 varieties, including a long entry "allee" drive formed by tall oaks, a couple groves of pine trees and an apple orchard. Large concentrations of daffodils were planted in various sections of the estate that beautifully complemented the flowering trees in the spring. The tree selections, particularly maples and oaks, provided vivid red and yellow colors in fall, and the evergreens and hollies provided color in winter and year-round. Adjacent to the orchard were wooden beehives that helped pollinate the orchard trees and flowers on the estate and that produced honey. Dozens of bird houses were also placed in the trees. Rather than decorate a cut tree for Christmas, Wm. C. always purchased a live tree and over 30 such trees were planted on the grounds, with some becoming quite large.

On a hill to the west of the main estate, each of the Schott's sons, William Riedlin Schott (Wm.R). and Louis Lueders Schott (Louis L.), built homes for their families. Wm. R. called his home Copper Beeches, because a couple of these beautiful trees were adjacent to his home. Shortly thereafter, in the early 1960s, the rural character of the area began to change with the development of residential subdivisions nearby. A local church and school adjacent to the estate, St. Antoninus, was expanding and wanted land for athletic fields. Wm. C. provided a pasture for that use and ultimately donated funds for land closer to the noted parish which became known as William C. Schott Memorial Fields, or simply as Schott Fields. It is now operated by the William C. Schott Memorial Association.

== Schott Family ==
The parents of William C. Schott (Will) and Lucia Riedlin Schott were enterprising German Americans with important brewery connections. Will was the youngest son of J. M. Schott, who was the founder of J. M. Schott & Sons Cooperage in Cincinnati, and Lucia was the youngest daughter of Wm. Riedlin Sr., the owner of Bavarian Brewing Company located in Covington, KY. By the turn of the 20th century, Bavarian was the largest brewery in its state and the large cooperage firm shipped to breweries in several states. After the death of J. M. Schott, his sons took over both J.M. Schott & Sons Cooperage and the Cincinnati Galvanizing Company. In 1920 the Schott brothers built a plant for the galvanizing firm in Cincinnati's Spring Grove industrial district and Will became the General Manager and a Director. Reopening the Bavarian Brewery by Lucia Riedlin's relatives shortly after prohibition was unsuccessful. However, Will and his brothers purchased the brewery out of bankruptcy in 1938 and expanded its operations. Will and his brothers became executives of both the Bavarian Brewery and the Cincinnati Galvanizing Co. for a couple of decades. By the 1950s, Will Schott's son's, William R. Schott and Louis L. Schott, were then living next to Pine Meer and had become President and Secretary/Treasurer of Bavarian's, respectfully. Louis L. also became an executive in the family's galvanizing firm in the 1960s. William C. Schott was a philanthropist providing funds for a local hospital wing and murals for Western Hills High School, besides donating land for Schott Fields. Lucia Schott predeceased her husband by nearly a decade, but Will lived at Pine Meer for over fifty-five years, dying at his home in 1981 at the age of 97.

== Historic site ==
The house was listed on the National Register of Historic Places on November 30, 1982, qualifying because of its historically significant architecture; it is presently the only historic house recorded for Green Township. The youngest son, Louis L. Schott, was interested in preserving the main house and the original style of landscaping around the buildings. He was also involved in subdividing much of the original acreage into a residential subdivision and a couple condominium complexes. One complex was named after the estate and is called Pine Meer Condominiums and the other is known as Pennsbury Condominiums. Even though architectural covenants were provided to help maintain the character of the original estate and the area, the west side of the entrance was subdivided into four lots, which no longer makes the entry a private drive to only the Manor House.
