= Twelve Mile House =

Historic house in Ohio, United States

- U.S. National Register of Historic Places
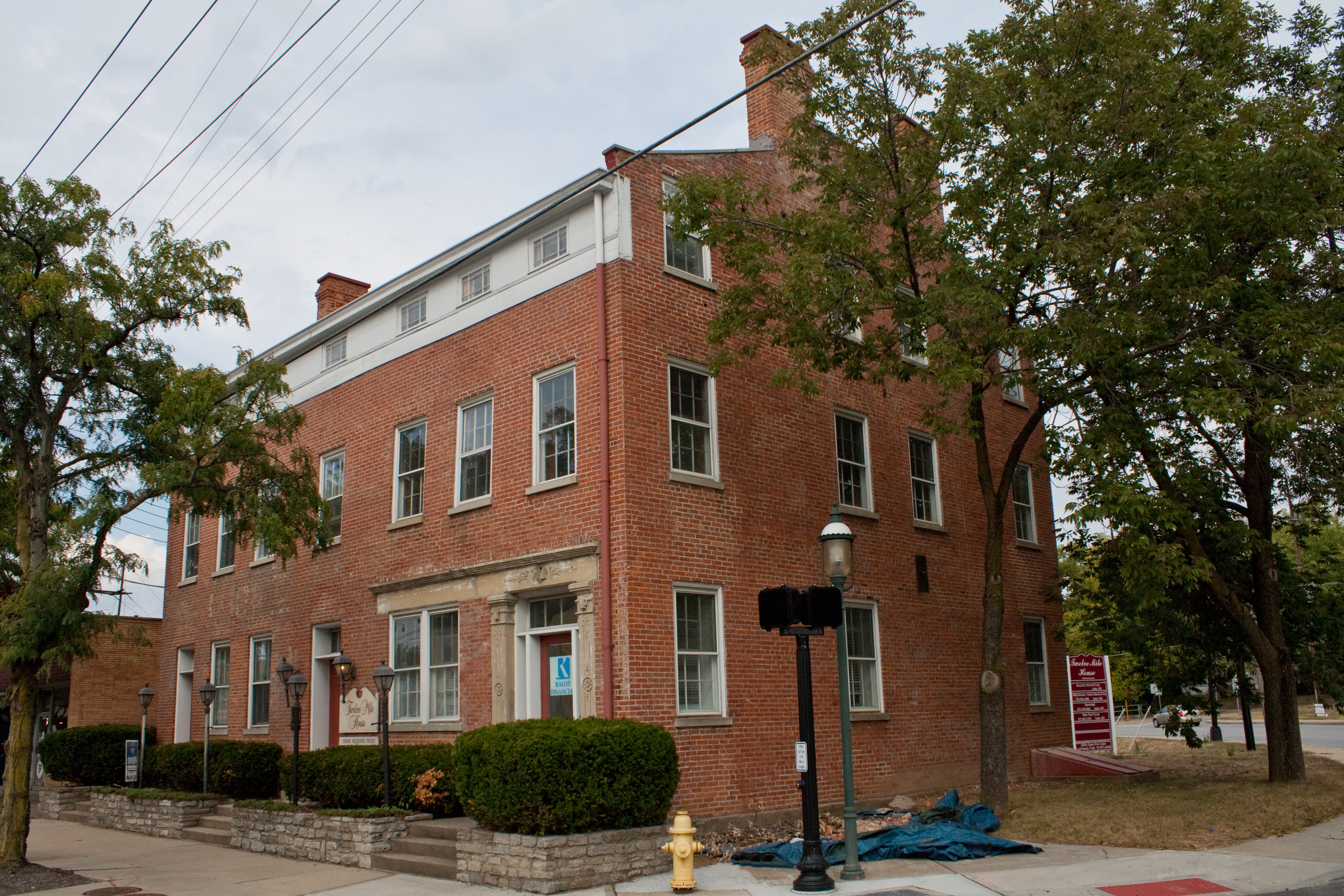

- Location within Ohio Location within the United States
- Location: Sharonville, Ohio
- Coordinates: 39°16′7.67″N 84°24′46.93″W
- Architectural style: Greek Revival
- NRHP reference No.: 76001452
- Added to NRHP: September 1, 1976

Twelve Mile House is a registered historic building in Sharonville, Ohio. It is an L-shaped, 2 1/2 story Greek revival building that was built in 1842 as an inn and tavern.

It was listed in the National Register on September 1, 1976.
