= W.C. Retszch House =

Historic house in Ohio, United States

- W. C. Retszch House
- U.S. National Register of Historic Places
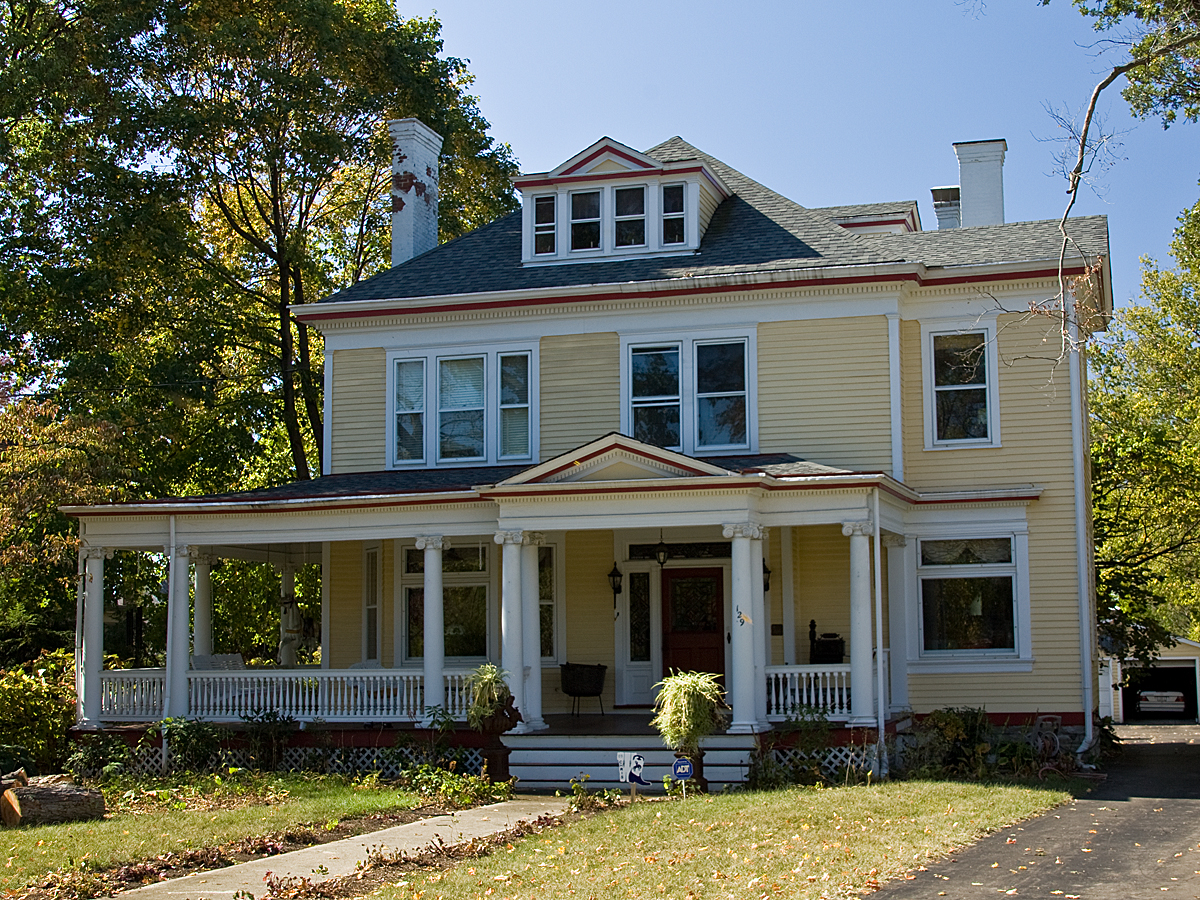
- Front of the house

- Location within Ohio Location within the United States
- Location: 129 Springfield Pike, Wyoming, Ohio
- Coordinates: 39°13′16″N 84°28′24″W
- Area: 2.1 acres (0.85 ha)
- Built: 1907
- Architectural style: Neoclassical
- MPS: Wyoming MRA
- NRHP reference No.: 86001642
- Added to NRHP: August 25, 1986

The W.C. Retszch House is a historic residence in the city of Wyoming, Ohio, United States. Built at the opening of the late nineteenth century, it was originally the home of a Cincinnati-area businessman, and it has been designated a historic site because of its distinctive architecture.

== Architecture ==
Two and a half stories tall and built on a stone foundation, the weatherboarded Retzsch House features an asphalt roof and elements of wood and iron. Although it features some Colonial Revival and American Foursquare influences, it is primarily a Neoclassical structure, featuring elements such as a pediment and Ionic columns on the massive wrap-around porch with a fragile narrow balustrade. Situated in the center bay of the facade, the main entrance is framed by sidelights and a transom window of leaded art glass. Chimneys are placed on both ends of the house, with a four-over-four pedimented dormer window in the middle. Much of the exterior is topped by a prominent cornice, and the entire property is framed by a large wrought iron fence.

== Historic context ==
Good transportation is a leading reason for Wyoming's prosperity. The city lies near the old pre-statehood road that connected Cincinnati with locations farther north, such as Fort Hamilton and Fallen Timbers. Curves in the road were cut off in 1806, forming a new road that is today followed by Springfield Pike through central Wyoming. Improvements in the 1830s only enhanced its importance. By this time, another mode of transportation had become significant: the Miami and Erie Canal was built a short distance to the east in 1828, and the village of Lockland grew up along its side. Railroads reached the city in 1851 with the construction of the Cincinnati, Hamilton, and Dayton Railroad on the border between Lockland and Wyoming.

Because of Wyoming's proximity to the industry of Lockland, its easy transportation to the booming city of Cincinnati, and its pleasant scenery, many wealthy industrialists purchased local farms and built grand country houses. Most such houses were built in the Wyoming Hills area, west of Springfield Pike; growth in this area continued until the coming of the Great Depression. W.C. Retszch was among the most prominent of these industrialists, having built the house in 1907 while occupying the presidency of the National Label Company.

== Historic site ==
In 1979, a local historic preservation group began a citywide survey to identify Wyoming's historic buildings, and this effort culminated with a multiple property submission of eighteen houses, the Wyoming Presbyterian Church, and one historic district to the National Register of Historic Places in 1985. Along with all but one of the other properties, the Retszch House was listed on the Register in the following year, qualifying because of its historically significant architecture and because of its connection to W.C. Retszch.
