= Jehu John House =

Historic house in Ohio, United States

- U.S. National Register of Historic Places
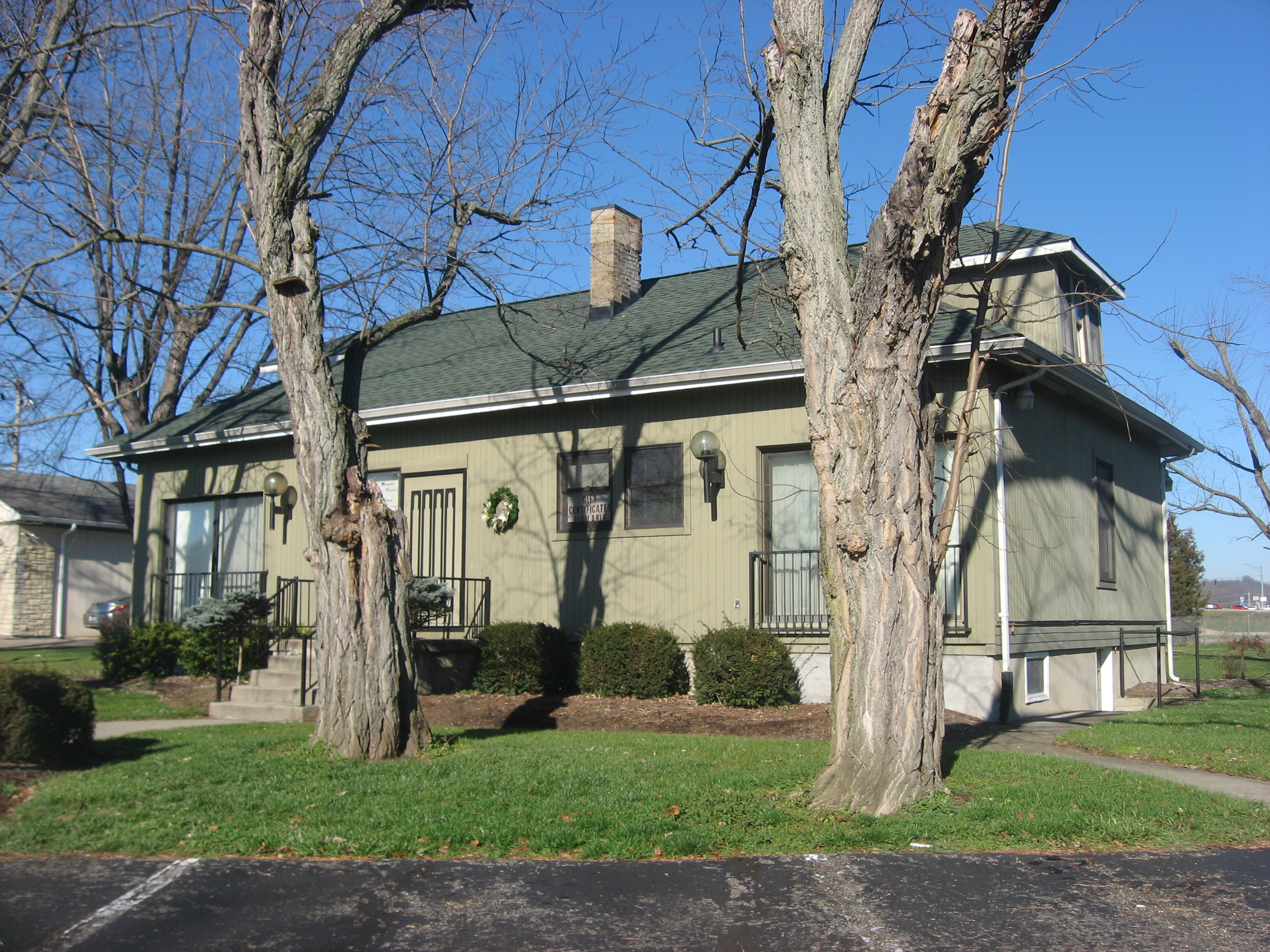
- Building on the site of the house

- Location within Ohio Location within the United States
- Location: Stone Dr., Harrison, Ohio
- Coordinates: 39°15′29″N 84°47′50″W
- Area: Less than 1 acre (0.40 ha)
- Built: 1836
- Architect: Dr. Jehu John, Jr.
- NRHP reference No.: 75001428
- Added to NRHP: October 31, 1975

The Jehu John House was a historic house and school building in the far southwestern part of the U.S. state of Ohio. Located in the city of Harrison near Cincinnati, it was one of the area's earlier buildings and home to one of its most prominent residents. Although it was named a historic site in the 1970s, it has been removed.

Born in 1796, Jehu John, Jr was an early physician in Hamilton County who made himself rich by producing and selling a medicine for fevers, which became highly popular. With his finances assured, he abandoned the practice of medicine and devoted himself to education, opening a school in his house in late 1847. The house was built on land belonging to the family of Ohio Governor Othniel Looker, whose granddaughter Emily had married Jehu John in 1828.

Built in a combination of brick and stone with a tin roof, the John House was a simple one-and-a-half-story house with narrow gabled ends and a wide front; no windows were placed on the ends, while the front featured a doorway with two windows on each side. The basic floor plan was that of the letter "T", with the long end to the rear.

One of southwestern Ohio's best stone residences from the settlement period, the Jehu John House was listed on the National Register of Historic Places in late 1975; it qualified both because of its connection to John and because of its important architecture. Despite this designation, the house no longer occupies its location on Stone Drive; a newer building has taken its place.
