= Salem Methodist Church Complex (Cincinnati, Ohio) =

- U.S. National Register of Historic Places
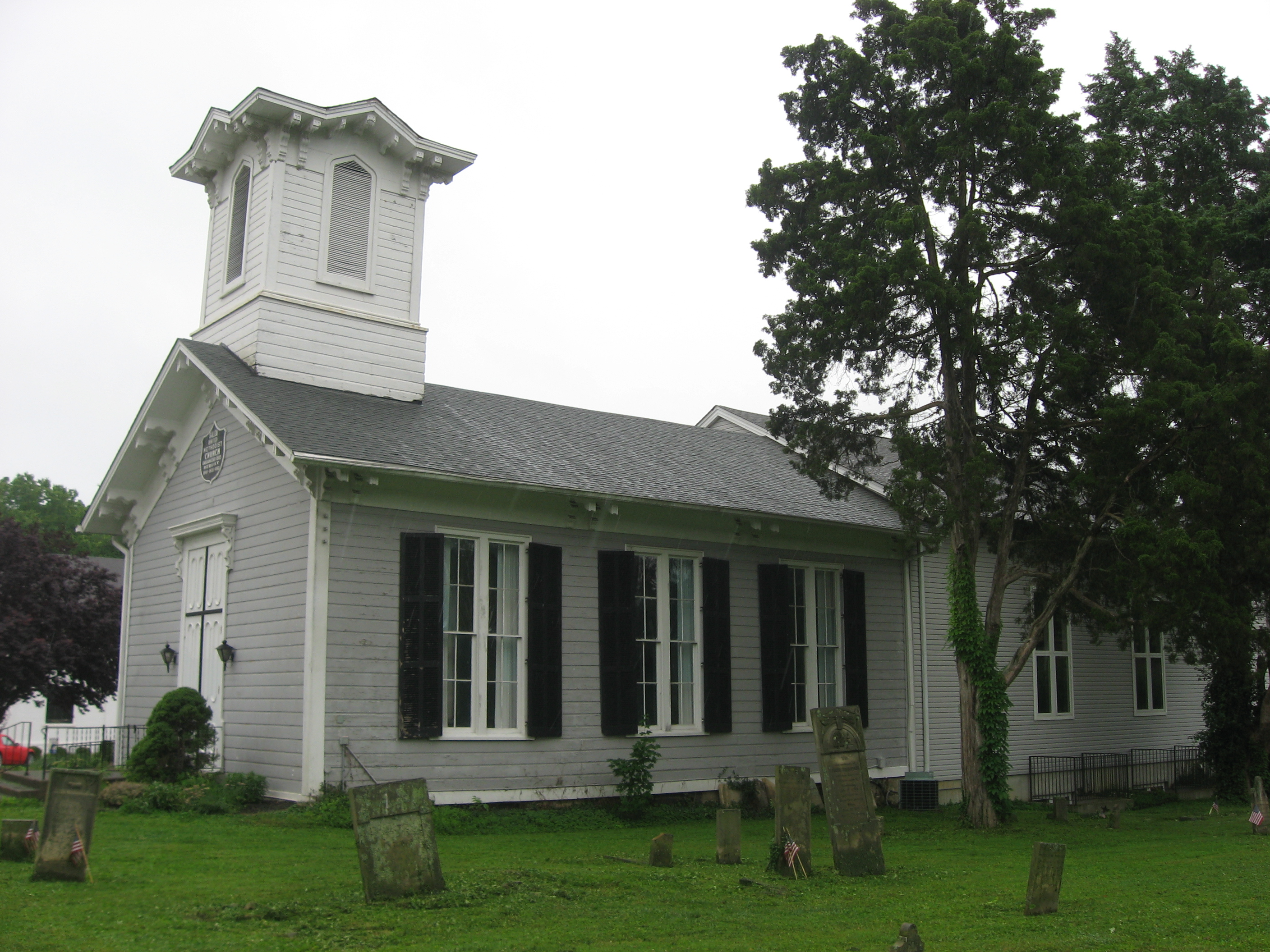
- Side and front of the church building

- Location within Ohio Location within the United States
- Nearest city: Cincinnati, Ohio
- Coordinates: 39°4′31.09″N 84°23′26.91″W
- Architectural style: Italianate
- NRHP reference No.: 82003586
- Added to NRHP: April 29, 1982

Salem Methodist Church Complex is a registered historic building near Cincinnati, Ohio, listed in the National Register on April 29, 1982.

The Ohio Historical Marker placed by the Ohio History Connection in 1969 reads on one side, "The Church. Families of Salem Settlement first held services in Francis McCormick's log home. A log church was built here in 1810 on land McCormick gave for religious and educational purposes. A new brick church was constructed in 1828. In 1863 the existing church was built, the bricks from the second church being used for the educational building next door." The reverse side reads, "The Founder. Francis McCormick (1764-1836), who fought under Lafayette at the siege of Yorktown, founded Methodism in the Northwest Territory. His evangelical and pioneer spirit led him from his Virginia birthplace to establish churches in the wilderness, first at Milford, Ohio, then here, at his village of Salem. He rests with his family and followers in the nearby churchyard."

== Historic uses ==
- School
- Religious Structure
- Cemetery
