= Old Gothic Barns =

- U.S. National Register of Historic Places
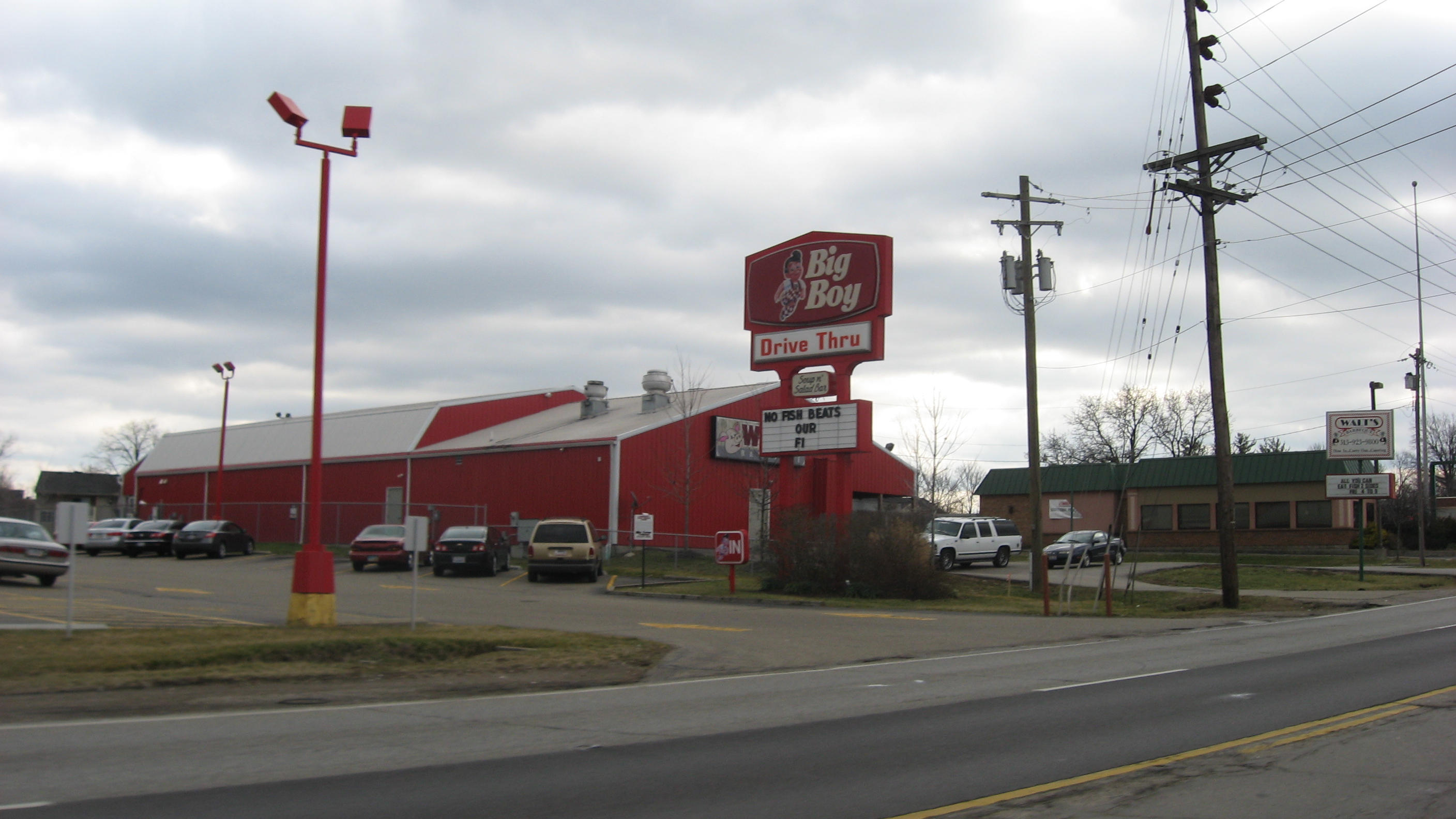
- Site of the barns

- Location within Ohio Location within the United States
- Location: 6058 Colerain Ave., Cincinnati, Ohio
- Coordinates: 39°12′13″N 84°34′49″W
- Area: Less than 1 acre (0.40 ha)
- Built: 1840
- Architectural style: Gothic Revival
- NRHP reference No.: 76001438
- Added to NRHP: July 20, 1976

The Old Gothic Barns were a pair of historic agricultural buildings near the city of Cincinnati in Green Township, Hamilton County, Ohio, United States. Built in the second quarter of the nineteenth century, they were designated a historic site in the 1970s because of their distinctive architecture.

As one of Green Township's first settlers, farmer William Bell was able to amass a large estate; by the 1840s, he owned much land along present-day Colerain Avenue. Near the end of his life, he arranged for the construction of two barns in the Carpenter Gothic style. His choice of architectural style was highly unusual; Gothic Revival elements as found on these two barns are unknown at any other farm in southwestern Ohio. Both were built with an extremely vertical emphasis: a sharply pitched roof increased their height, and the impression of verticality was reinforced by elements such as vertical batten, a cupola with a spire, and the tall pointed windows and doors. These windows and doors, along with other elements such as brackets under the eaves, gave the barns an unusually pure Gothic Revival feel. Two stories tall with an attic, the barns featured shingled roofs.

A precise date for the barns' construction has been debated. Research has strongly suggested that the barns were constructed before Bell's death in 1847, it has been proven that he arranged for their construction, and they were clearly built after 1840 and before 1850, but no other details are known. Despite the lack of detailed information about their construction, the barns were clearly seen as architecturally significant by the 1970s. In 1976, they were recognized by their placement on the National Register of Historic Places; their architecture had been deemed to be important on a statewide level. However, the barns were no longer standing by the early 2010s; restaurants occupied their former location at 6058 Colerain Avenue.
