= Colerain Works Archeological District =

Archaeological site in Ohio, United States

- U.S. National Register of Historic Places
- U.S. Historic district
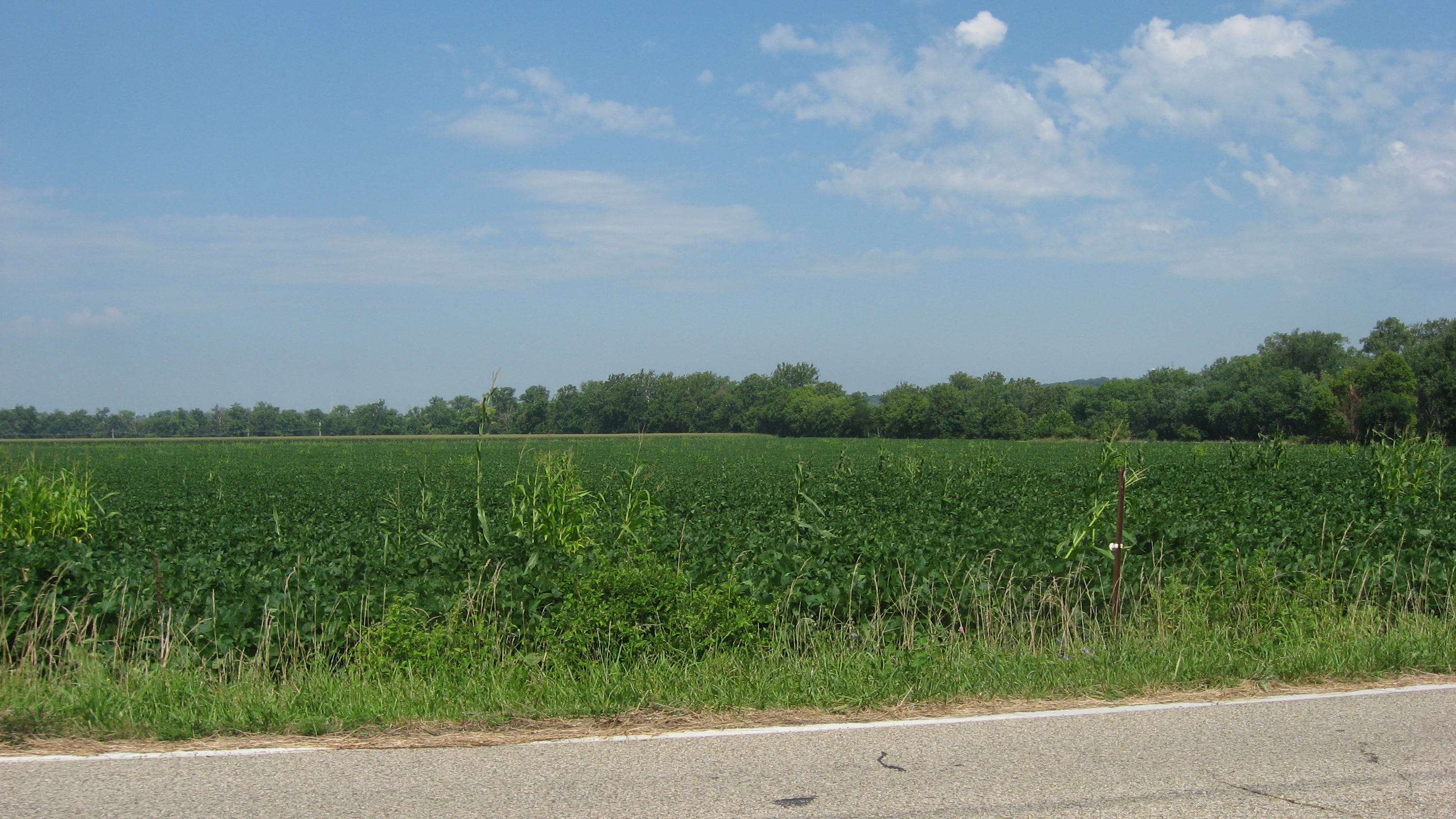
- Overview of the field containing the works
- Nearest city: Dunlap, Ohio
- Area: 200 acres (81 ha)
- NRHP reference No.: 76001445
- Added to NRHP: June 18, 1976

Colerain Works Archeological District is a registered historic district near Dunlap, Ohio, listed in the National Register of Historic Places on June 18, 1976. It contains 0 contributing buildings.

== Historic uses ==
- Fortification
