= Glendale, Ohio =

- Village
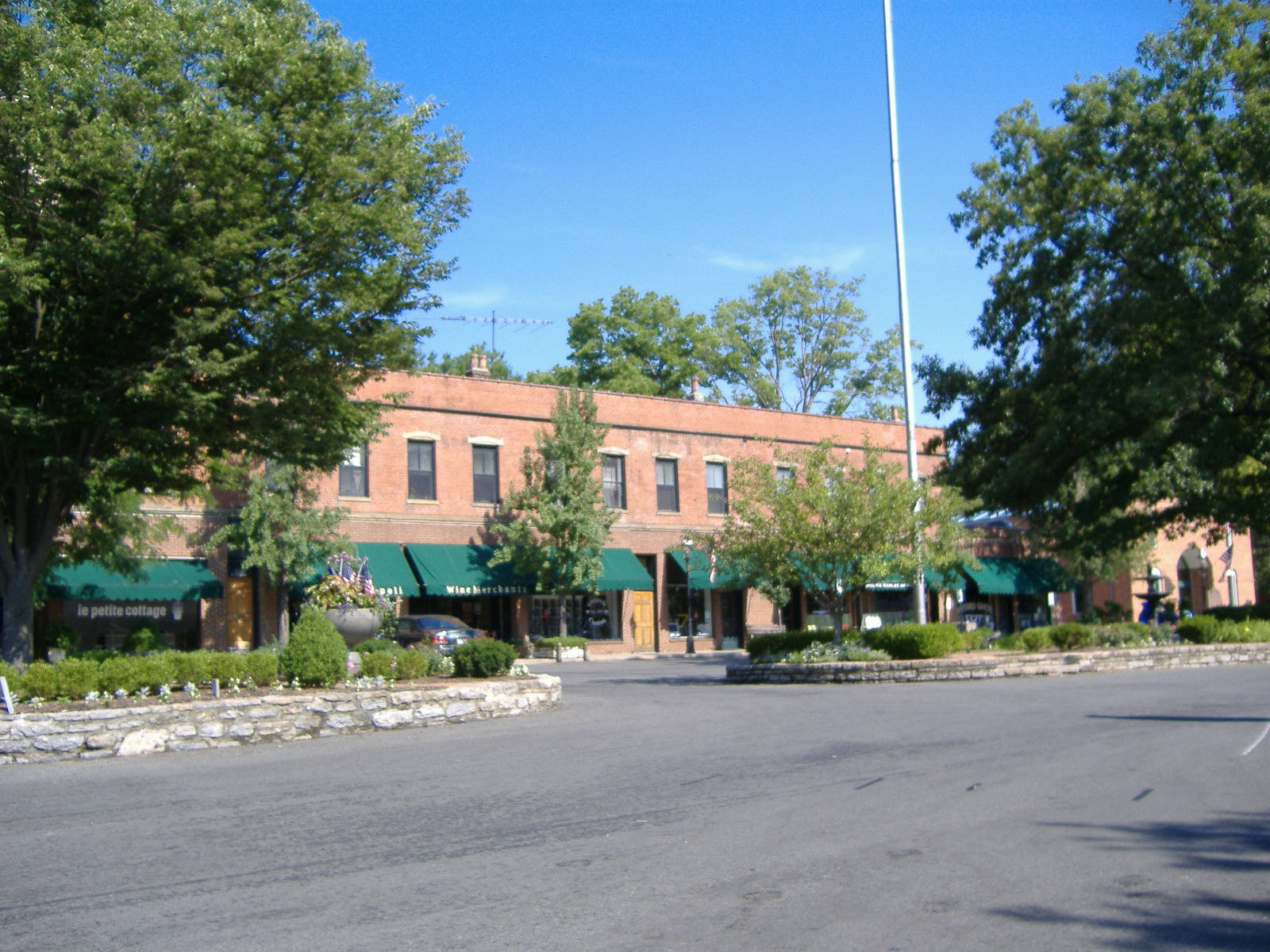
- Shops downtown

- Flag Logo

- Location in Hamilton County and the state of Ohio.
- Coordinates: 39°16′14″N 84°27′31″W
- Country: United States
- State: Ohio
- County: Hamilton

Government
  - Mayor: Mike Besl

Area
  - Total: 1.64 sq mi (4.25 km^{2})
  - Land: 1.64 sq mi (4.25 km^{2})
  - Water: 0 sq mi (0.00 km^{2})
- Elevation: 627 ft (191 m)

Population (2020)
  - Total: 2,298
  - Estimate (2023): 2,263
  - Density: 1,399.9/sq mi (540.49/km^{2})
- Time zone: UTC-5 (Eastern (EST))
  - Summer (DST): UTC-4 (EDT)
- ZIP code: 45246
- Area code: 513
- FIPS code: 39-30380
- GNIS feature ID: 1086210
- Website: www.glendaleohio.org

Glendale is a village in Hamilton County, Ohio, United States. The population was 2,298 at the 2020 census. It is a northern suburb of Cincinnati, and is the site of the Glendale Historic District.

== Geography ==
According to the United States Census Bureau, the village has a total area of 1.69 square miles (4.38 km^{2}), all land.

== Demographics ==
Historical population
Census	Pop.	Note	%±
1860	690		—
1870	1,780		158.0%
1880	1,400		−21.3%
1890	1,444		3.1%
1900	1,545		7.0%
1910	1,741		12.7%
1920	1,759		1.0%
1930	2,300		30.8%
1940	2,359		2.6%
1950	2,402		1.8%
1960	2,823		17.5%
1970	2,690		−4.7%
1980	2,368		−12.0%
1990	2,445		3.3%
2000	2,188		−10.5%
2010	2,155		−1.5%
2020	2,298		6.6%
2023 (est.)	2,263	▼	−1.5%
U.S. Decennial Census

=== 2020 census ===
As of the census of 2020, there were 2,298 people living in the village, for a population density of 1,399.51 people per square mile (540.49/km^{2}). There were 1,074 housing units. The racial makeup of the village was 79.7% White, 12.3% Black or African American, 0.1% Native American, 1.6% Asian, 0.0% Pacific Islander, 1.7% from some other race, and 4.7% from two or more races. 3.4% of the population were Hispanic or Latino of any race.

There were 838 households, out of which 21.5% had children under the age of 18 living with them, 55.4% were married couples living together, 18.6% had a male householder with no spouse present, and 20.2% had a female householder with no spouse present. 32.2% of all households were made up of individuals, and 14.4% were someone living alone who was 65 years of age or older. The average household size was 2.26, and the average family size was 2.83.

19.8% of the village's population were under the age of 18, 53.5% were 18 to 64, and 26.7% were 65 years of age or older. The median age was 49.7. For every 100 females, there were 97.7 males.

According to the U.S. Census American Community Survey, for the period 2016-2020 the estimated median annual income for a household in the village was $97,917, and the median income for a family was $146,250. About 12.0% of the population were living below the poverty line, including 18.5% of those under age 18 and 12.2% of those age 65 or over. About 61.5% of the population were employed, and 64.0% had a bachelor's degree or higher.

=== 2010 census ===
As of the census of 2010, there were 2,155 people, 969 households, and 628 families living in the village. The population density was 1,275.1 inhabitants per square mile (492.3/km^{2}). There were 1,057 housing units at an average density of 625.4 per square mile (241.5/km^{2}). The racial makeup of the village was 81.4% White, 15.4% African American, 1.5% Asian, 0.4% from other races, and 1.3% from two or more races. Hispanic or Latino of any race were 1.3% of the population.

There were 969 households, of which 23.9% had children under the age of 18 living with them, 55.0% were married couples living together, 7.3% had a female householder with no husband present, 2.5% had a male householder with no wife present, and 35.2% were non-families. 30.7% of all households were made up of individuals, and 11.3% had someone living alone who was 65 years of age or older. The average household size was 2.20 and the average family size was 2.75.

The median age in the village was 49.6 years. 19.6% of residents were under the age of 18; 3.5% were between the ages of 18 and 24; 18.8% were from 25 to 44; 38.1% were from 45 to 64; and 20.1% were 65 years of age or older. The gender makeup of the village was 48.4% male and 51.6% female.

== Government ==
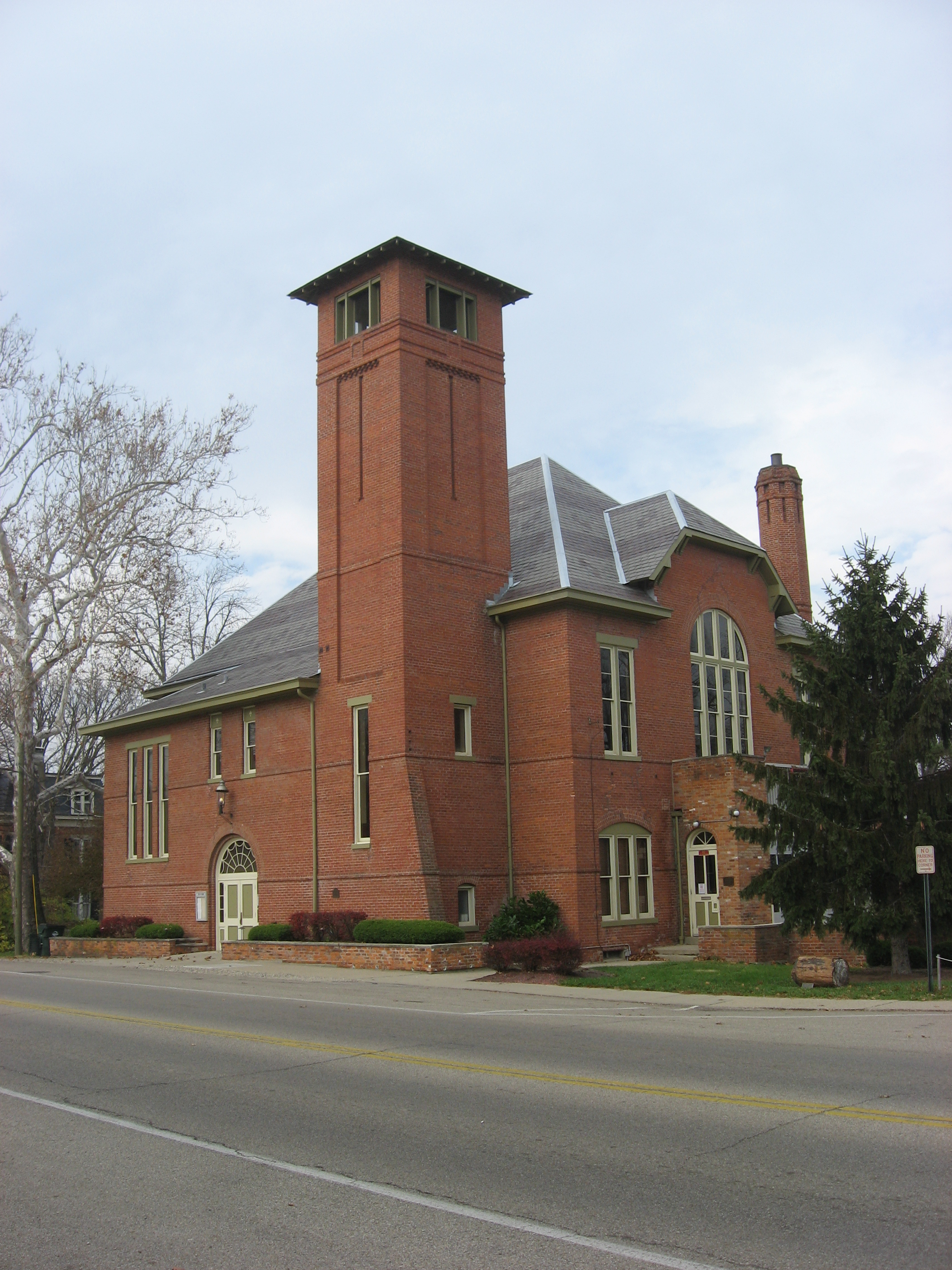
Glendale Village Hall

Glendale operates its own wastewater (sewage) treatment plant and water plant (artesian wells).

== Culture ==
Glendale's symbol is the black squirrel. Twenty-five statues of squirrels in varying attire have been placed by certain buildings in the style of downtown Cincinnati's Big Pig Gig.

== Education ==
Glendale is served by Princeton City Schools, a consolidated school district also serving the communities of Evendale, Lincoln Heights, Sharonville, Springdale and Woodlawn. Glendale public students attend Glendale Elementary, Princeton Middle School, and Princeton High School. Private schools in Glendale are Bethany School (a K-8 school associated with the Episcopal Church Community of the Transfiguration) and St. Gabriel (affiliated with the Roman Catholic Archdiocese of Cincinnati).

== Notable people ==
- Sparky Anderson, lived in Glendale while managing the Cincinnati Reds in the 1970s.
- Peg Entwistle, actress famous for her suicide by jumping off the Hollywood Sign
- Megan McCormick, host of the series Globe Trekker
- Alfred B. Mullett, architect
- John Weld Peck II, Federal Judge, United States Court of Appeals for the Sixth Circuit
- William Cooper Procter, born and lived in Glendale.
- Charles W. Sawyer, United States Secretary of Commerce from 1948–1953.
- Bob Trumpy, former Cincinnati Bengals player, NBC and CBS broadcaster
- Albert Tyler, athlete
- Otto Warmbier, prisoner in North Korea, buried in Glendale in 2017.
