= Harrison Township, Hamilton County, Ohio =

Township in Ohio, US

- Township
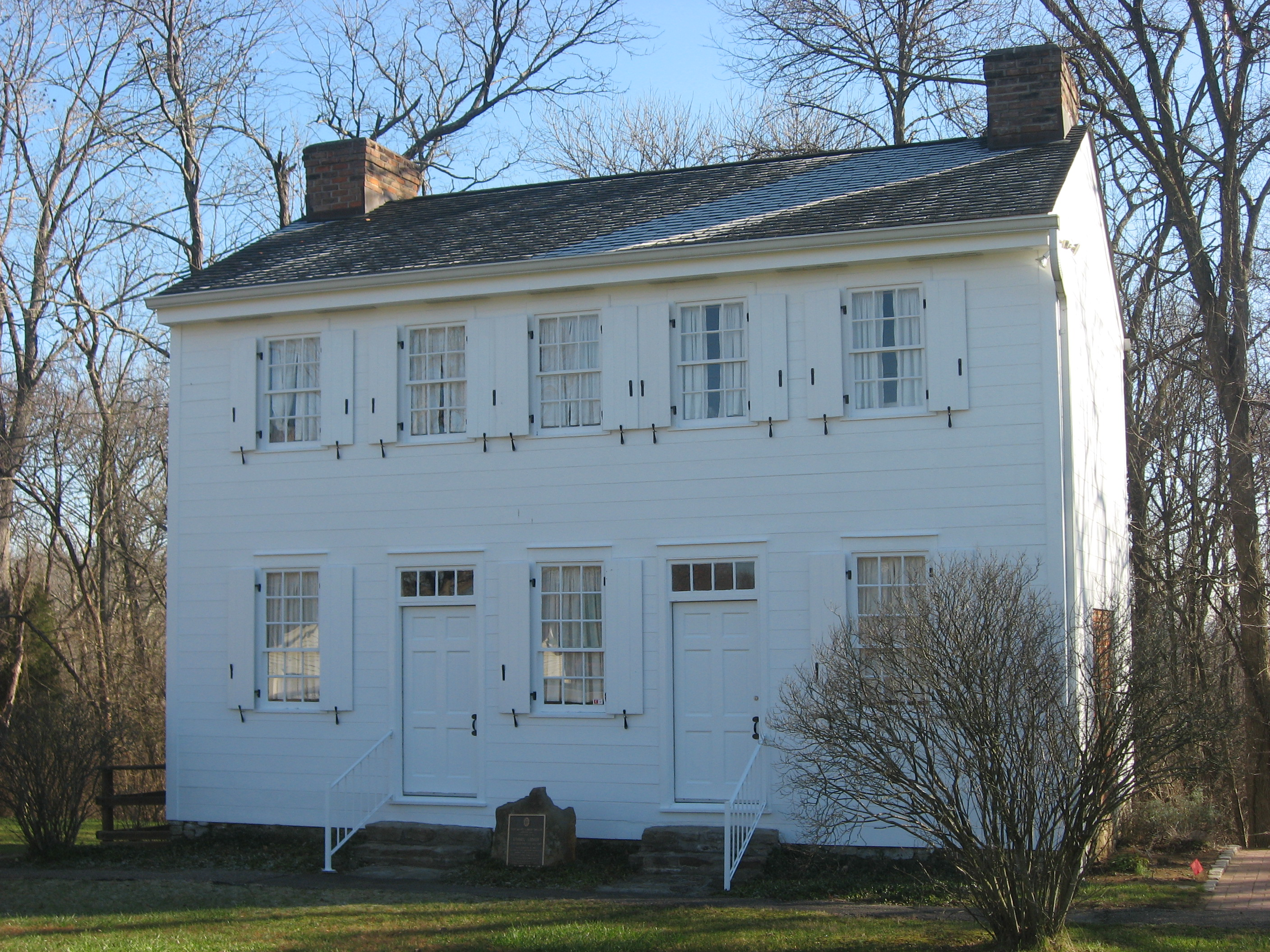
- Former home of Governor Othniel Looker

- Flag Seal

- Location in Hamilton County and the state of Ohio.
- Coordinates: 39°15′25″N 84°47′57″W
- Country: United States
- State: Ohio
- County: Hamilton

Area
  - Total: 17.8 sq mi (46.2 km^{2})
  - Land: 17.5 sq mi (45.4 km^{2})
  - Water: 0.35 sq mi (0.9 km^{2})
- Elevation: 610 ft (186 m)

Population (2020)
  - Total: 14,288
  - Density: 815.1/sq mi (314.71/km^{2})
- Time zone: UTC-5 (Eastern (EST))
  - Summer (DST): UTC-4 (EDT)
- ZIP code: 45030
- Area code: 513
- FIPS code: 39-33852
- GNIS feature ID: 1086214
- Website: www.harrisontownshipohio.com

Harrison Township is one of the twelve townships of Hamilton County, Ohio, United States. The 2020 census found 14,288 people in the township.

== Name and history ==
It is one of nineteen Harrison Townships statewide.

== Geography ==
Located in the northwestern corner of the county, it borders the following townships:

- Morgan Township, Butler County - north
- Crosby Township - east
- Whitewater Township - southeast
- Miller Township, Dearborn County, Indiana - southwest corner
- Harrison Township, Dearborn County, Indiana - west
- Whitewater Township, Franklin County, Indiana - northwest corner

The city of Harrison is located in central Harrison Township but also extends into Crosby Township.

== Demographics ==
Historical population
Census	Pop.	Note	%±
1860	1,347		—
1870	758		−43.7%
1880	2,277		200.4%
1890	2,391		5.0%
1900	2,092		−12.5%
1910	1,963		−6.2%
1920	1,891		−3.7%
1930	1,936		2.4%
1940	2,435		25.8%
1950	2,923		20.0%
1960	5,525		89.0%
1970	6,226		12.7%
1980	9,310		49.5%
1990	12,145		30.5%
2000	12,469		2.7%
2010	13,934		11.7%
2020	14,288		2.5%

=== 2020 census ===
As of the census of 2020, there were 14,288 people living in the township, for a population density of 816.5 people per square mile (314.7/km^{2}). There were 5,960 housing units. The racial makeup of the township was 93.6% White, 0.7% Black or African American, 0.2% Native American, 0.5% Asian, 0.0% Pacific Islander, 0.7% from some other race, and 4.3% from two or more races. 1.8% of the population were Hispanic or Latino of any race.

There were 5,752 households, out of which 30.7% had children under the age of 18 living with them, 54.2% were married couples living together, 15.1% had a male householder with no spouse present, and 23.9% had a female householder with no spouse present. 27.3% of all households were made up of individuals, and 13.2% were someone living alone who was 65 years of age or older. The average household size was 2.47, and the average family size was 3.00.

23.3% of the township's population were under the age of 18, 59.0% were 18 to 64, and 17.7% were 65 years of age or older. The median age was 40.2. For every 100 females, there were 93.0 males.

According to the U.S. Census American Community Survey, for the period 2016-2020 the estimated median annual income for a household in the township was $80,295, and the median income for a family was $95,255. About 6.1% of the population were living below the poverty line, including 7.9% of those under age 18 and 11.6% of those age 65 or over. About 69.4% of the population were employed, and 24.7% had a bachelor's degree or higher.

== Government ==
The township is governed by a three-member board of trustees, who are elected in November of odd-numbered years to a four-year term beginning on the following January 1. Two are elected in the year after the presidential election and one is elected in the year before it. There is also an elected township fiscal officer, who serves a four-year term beginning on April 1 of the year after the election, which is held in November of the year before the presidential election. Vacancies in the fiscal officership or on the board of trustees are filled by the remaining trustees.
