= Elizabethtown, Ohio =

- Census-designated place
- Location in Hamilton County and the state of Ohio.
- Coordinates: 39°09′44″N 84°48′14″W
- Country: United States
- State: Ohio
- County: Hamilton

Area
  - Total: 0.90 sq mi (2.34 km^{2})
  - Land: 0.89 sq mi (2.30 km^{2})
  - Water: 0.015 sq mi (0.04 km^{2})
- Elevation: 482 ft (147 m)

Population (2020)
  - Total: 323
  - Density: 363.2/sq mi (140.22/km^{2})
- Time zone: UTC-5 (Eastern (EST))
  - Summer (DST): UTC-4 (EDT)
- FIPS code: 39-24850
- GNIS feature ID: 2585509

Elizabethtown is a census-designated place (CDP) in Whitewater Township, Hamilton County, Ohio, United States. The population was 323 at the 2020 census.

== History ==
Elizabethtown was platted in 1817 by Isaac Mills, and named for his wife. It was a depot on the Cleveland, Cincinnati, Chicago and St. Louis Railway. In 1894, Elizabethtown was described as having three stores, two churches and a grain elevator.

== Geography ==
Elizabethtown is located in the valley of the Great Miami River, 20 miles (32 km) west of downtown Cincinnati. U.S. Route 50 runs through the center of the community, and Interstate 275 passes it to the northwest but does not provide direct access to it.

According to the United States Census Bureau, the CDP has a total area of 0.89 square miles (2.3 km^{2}), all land.

== Demographics ==
As of the census of 2020, there were 323 people living in the CDP, for a population density of 363.33 people per square mile (140.22/km^{2}). There were 143 housing units. The racial makeup of the CDP was 88.2% White, 0.6% Black or African American, 0.6% Native American, 0.0% Asian, 0.3% Pacific Islander, 3.1% from some other race, and 7.1% from two or more races. 3.7% of the population were Hispanic or Latino of any race.

There were 127 households, out of which 28.3% had children under the age of 18 living with them, 25.2% were married couples living together, 26.0% had a male householder with no spouse present, and 48.8% had a female householder with no spouse present. 55.9% of all households were made up of individuals, and 4.7% were someone living alone who was 65 years of age or older. The average household size was 1.89, and the average family size was 3.02.

25.4% of the CDP's population were under the age of 18, 70.0% were 18 to 64, and 4.6% were 65 years of age or older. The median age was 38.8. For every 100 females, there were 108.7 males.

According to the U.S. Census American Community Survey, for the period 2016-2020 the estimated median annual income for a household in the CDP was $17,946, and the median income for a family was $20,714. About 50.4% of the population were living below the poverty line, including 72.1% of those under age 18 and 100.0% of those age 65 or over. About 52.7% of the population were employed, and 0.0% had a bachelor's degree or higher.
