= Clough Creek and Sand Ridge Archaeological District =

Archaeological site in Ohio, United States

- Clough Creek and Sand Ridge Archeological District
- U.S. National Register of Historic Places
- U.S. Historic district
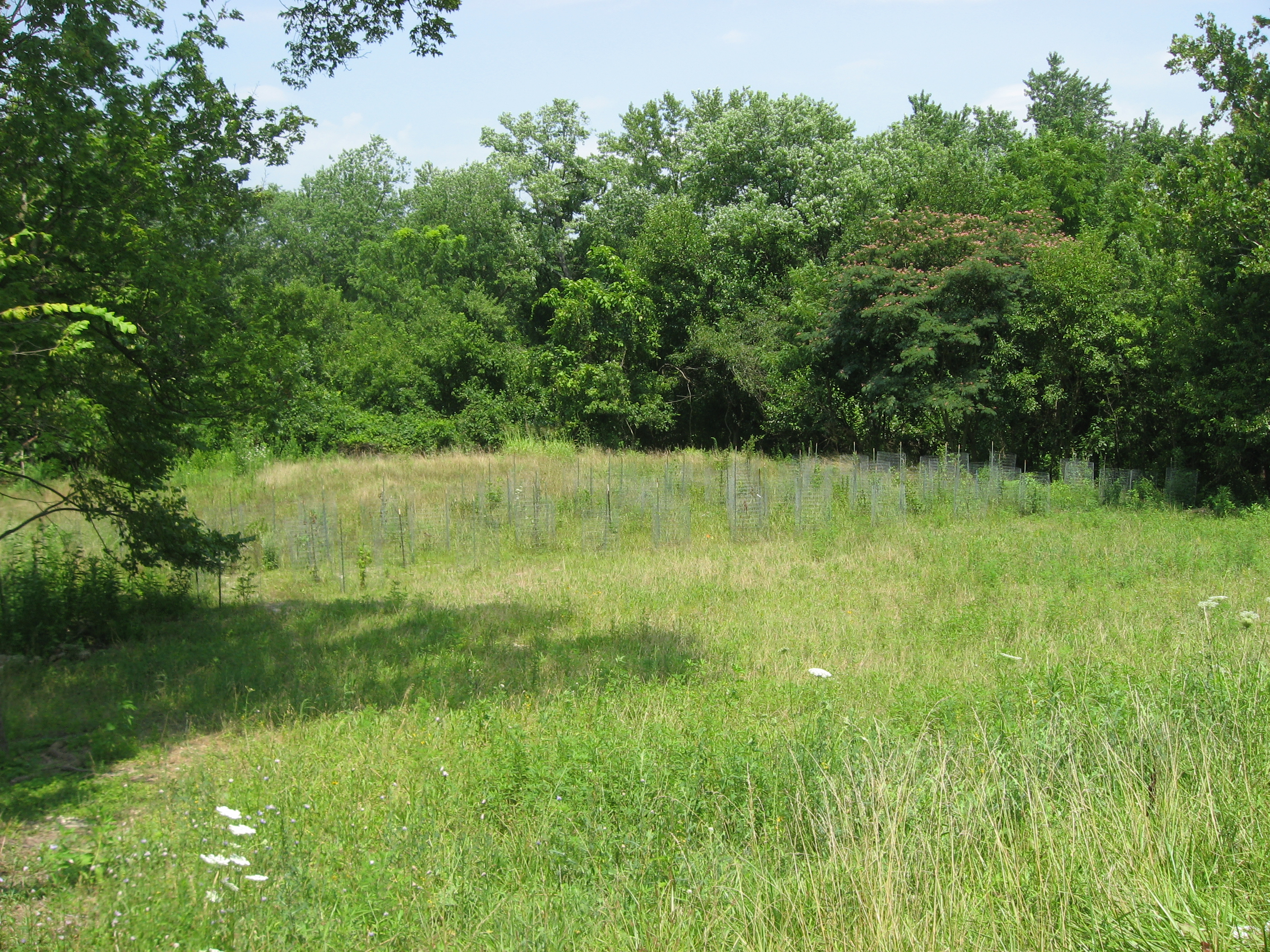
- Fields at the Sand Ridge Site

- Location within Ohio Location within the United States
- Location: Along the ridge to the west of the Union Bridge
- Nearest city: Cincinnati, Ohio
- Coordinates: 39°6′46″N 84°23′48″W
- Area: 70 acres (28 ha)
- NRHP reference No.: 74001509
- Added to NRHP: October 1, 1974

The Clough Creek and Sand Ridge Archaeological District is a historic district composed of two archaeological sites in the southwestern part of the U.S. state of Ohio. Its name is derived from those of the two sites included in the district: one that lies along Clough Creek (a tributary of the Little Miami River), and one that occupies part of the Sand Ridge near the creek.

== Sites ==
=== Clough Creek ===
The Clough Creek Site occupies an area of approximately 2 acres (0.81 ha); although no archaeological excavation has been conducted there, it is believed to have been the site of a large prehistoric village.

=== Sand Ridge ===
The Sand Ridge Site lies about 0.3 miles (0.48 km) away from the Clough Creek Site. Located along a prominent ridgeline to the west of the old Union Bridge along the road between Cincinnati and Batavia, it has long been known as a significant archaeological site. As early as the 1880s, many individuals frequently visited the ridge to collect artifacts from the surface, such as bones, pottery, and pieces of flint. The residents appear to have inhabited the site only seasonally, with autumn and winter being the most likely times of occupation. They appear to have been heavily dependent on fish for their food, as many fish bones have been discovered at Sand Ridge; among the most common types of fish were suckers, channel catfish, and freshwater drums.

== Excavation and conclusions ==
On behalf of the Peabody Museum of Archaeology and Ethnology, archaeologists investigated a midden at Sand Ridge in 1884. They were able to add a wide range of artifacts to the museum's collection, including a wide range of stone tools, bird and deer bones, and projectile points. In more recent years, Clough Creek has also attracted attention for the artifacts visible on its surface, including scrapers, blanks, and projectile points. According to archaeological estimates, some artifacts at the site may be buried as much as 5 feet (1.5 m) below the surface.

Despite the distance between the two sites, they are believed to be closely related. Artifacts found at Sand Ridge indicate that they are part of the Madisonville Focus of the Fort Ancient culture. This identification is based primarily on the pottery recovered, which resembles that of the Madisonville and State Line Sites. A distinctive feature of Sand Ridge is the presence of artifacts from two chronologically different cultures: the Fort Ancient village was apparently built on the site of an earlier Late Woodland occupation.

== Recognition ==
In 1974, the Clough Creek and Sand Ridge Archaeological District was listed on the National Register of Historic Places because of its information-yielding potential. In the community of Newtown to the east are several villages that have received a similar status: the Perin, Turpin, and Hahn Field sites. Like Clough Creek and Sand Ridge, Turpin and Hahn Field were once Fort Ancient villages that were founded atop former Woodland period villages, while Perin Village and the related Odd Fellows' Cemetery Mound are exclusively Woodland sites.
