= Ferris House =

Ferris House may refer to:

== United States ==
Listed by state, then city:

- Samuel Ferris House, Greenwich, Connecticut
- John Ferris House, Washington, Connecticut
- Zachariah Ferris House, Wilmington, Delaware
- Edward Ferris House, a Michigan State Historic Site in Ingham County
- Sears–Ferris House, Carson City, Nevada
- Ferris House (New York), Ticonderoga, New York
- Joseph Ferris House, Cincinnati, Ohio
- Eliphalet Ferris House, Mariemont, Ohio
- Ferris House (Pittsburgh), Pittsburgh, Pennsylvania
- James W. Ferris House, listed on the NRHP in Codington County, South Dakota
