= Ferriz =

Ferriz is a surname of Spanish origin. Notable people with the surname include:

- Pedro Ferriz de Con (born 1950), Mexican news anchor
- Pedro Ferriz Santa Cruz (1921–2013), Mexican radio and television personality
- José Reyes Ferriz (born 1961), Mexican politician

== See also ==
- Ferris (disambiguation)
