= State Line Archeological District =

Archaeological site in Ohio, United States

- U.S. National Register of Historic Places
- U.S. Historic district
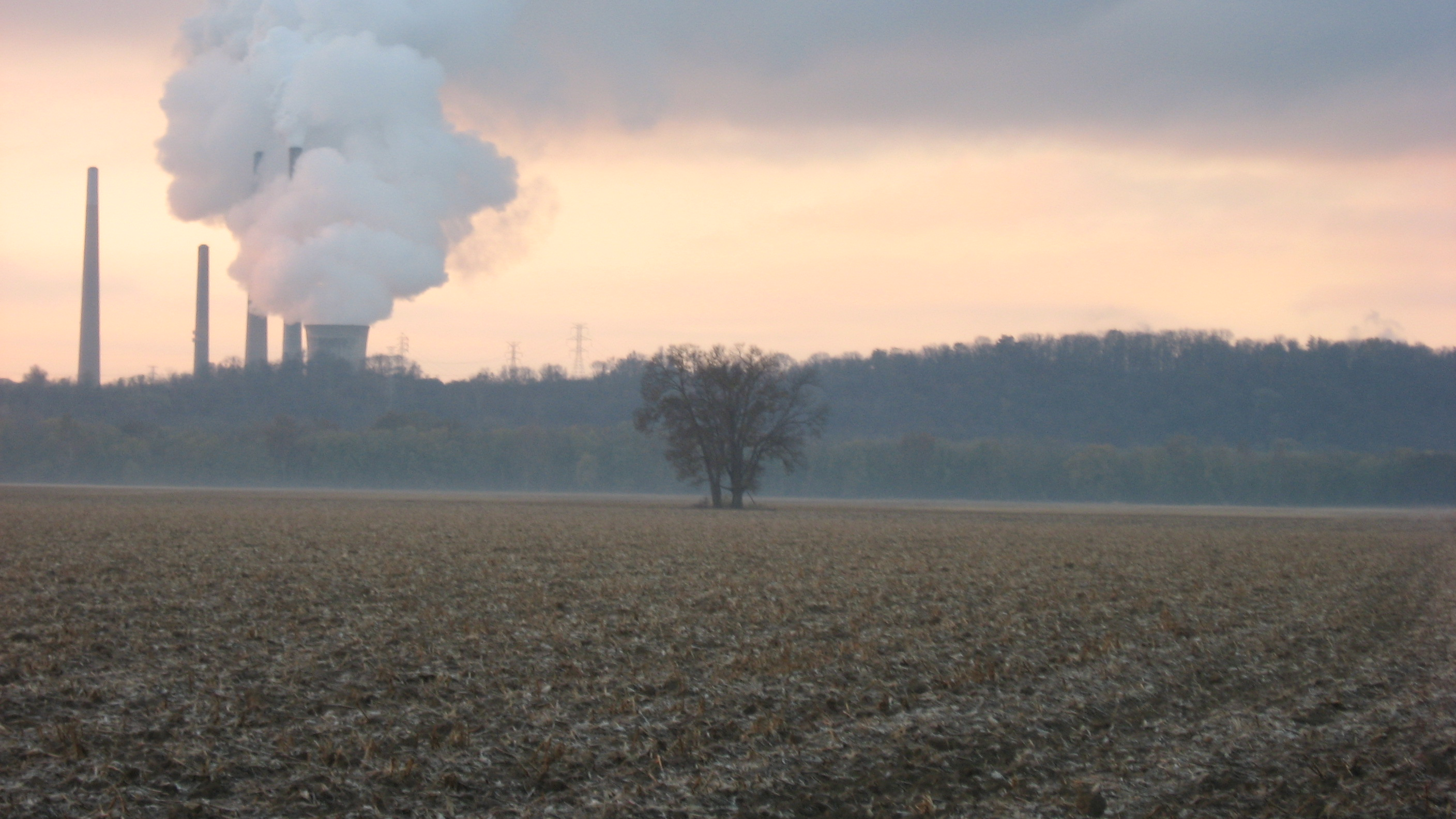
- Fields in the district

- Location within Ohio Location within the United States
- Location: On the Indiana/Ohio line, 2 miles (3.2 km) north of the Ohio River
- Nearest city: Elizabethtown, Ohio
- Coordinates: 39°8′15″N 84°49′12″W
- Area: 8 acres (3.2 ha)
- NRHP reference No.: 75001423
- Added to NRHP: July 24, 1975

The State Line Archeological District (also known as the State Line site) is a complex of archaeological sites and national historic district located west of Elizabethtown, Ohio, United States. Located on both sides of the Indiana/Ohio border, the historic district is composed of five contributing properties spread out across 8 acres (3.2 ha) of land. It is believed to have been the site of a village of the Fort Ancient culture of prehistoric Native Americans.

Radiocarbon dating has revealed that State Line was occupied at approximately the same time as the SunWatch site near Dayton, Ohio and the Turpin site at Newtown, Ohio, while post-excavation analysis has shown that the inhabitants of the three sites were all members of the same culture. Occupation of these sites is believed to date from the Middle Fort Ancient period of the thirteenth century AD.

A leading part of the district is a village site, also known as the "Henry Bechtel Village"; it includes a wide midden and a cemetery. Plowing of the fields at the village site has frequently turned up a wide range of artifacts, including burial pits, hearths, and trash pits. Ceramics found during excavation at the site have typically been tempered with shells. This pottery shares many characteristics with that produced by Middle Mississippian cultures, such as distinctive styles of painting and the presence of pottery modelled after owls and the heads of humans.

Because the midden is wide but quite shallow, it has been proposed that the village's population was significant but its period of occupation was short.

Among the district's contributing properties are three small burial mounds, which appear to be the work of earlier mound building peoples. At one time, the site comprised five mounds, but only three remain within the district's boundaries.

In 1975, State Line was listed on the National Register of Historic Places for its archaeological significance.

== See also ==
- List of archaeological sites on the National Register of Historic Places in Indiana
