= Turpin site =

Archaeological site in Ohio, United States

- Turpin Site
- U.S. National Register of Historic Places
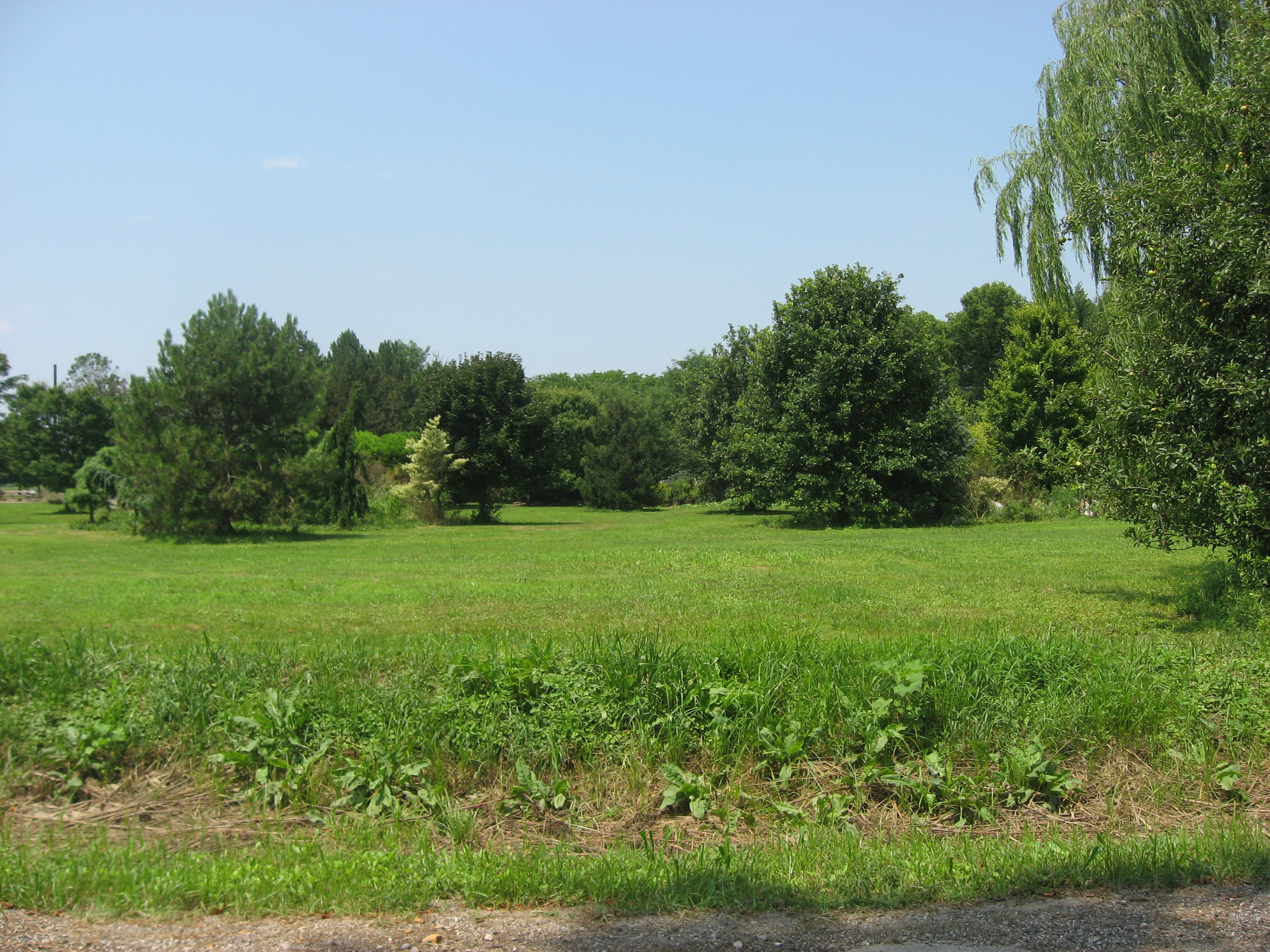
- Overview of the site

- Location within Ohio Location within the United States
- Location: On the Turpin farm property
- Nearest city: Newtown, Ohio
- Coordinates: 39°7′22.8″N 84°22′19.2″W
- Area: 9 acres (3.6 ha)
- NRHP reference No.: 74001514
- Added to NRHP: December 27, 1974

The Turpin Site (33Ha19) is an archaeological site in the southwestern portion of the U.S. state of Ohio. Located near Newtown in Hamilton County, the site includes the remains of a village of the Fort Ancient culture and of multiple burial mounds. Numerous bodies have been found in and around the mounds as a result of thorough site investigations. The archaeological value of the site has resulted in its use in the study of similar locations and in its designation as a historic site.

== Excavations ==
Local residents began to explore the Turpin Site at the end of the eighteenth century. At this time, it appears that at least three mounds were located in the vicinity of the main village site, as well as a Native American cemetery. This cemetery was a primary focus of an excavation in 1800, which resulted in the unearthing of fifty skeletons.

In 1881, the premier mound at the site — then on the farmstead of Philip Turpin — was recorded as being known as one of the principal prehistoric sites in Anderson Township; at that time, it stood 10 feet (3.0 m) high, and its base had a circumference of 175 feet (53 m). Due to its size and location along the road between Cincinnati and Batavia, it was a local landmark. Surrounding the mound was the densest portion of the cemetery; an 1877 history of the area said that "human remains may be exhumed with almost every lift of spade or shovel." Other mounds at the site included a stone mound believed to have been built during the Late Woodland period and an earth mound dating from the Fort Ancient period. During the late nineteenth century, two of the smaller mounds at the site were excavated under the direction of Charles Metz, and the Fort Ancient mound (the primary mound at the site) was investigated in 1947 by an expedition sponsored by the Cincinnati Museum of Natural History. Charles Metz had reported that this mound had apparently been reduced by the Turpin family. Over sixty bodies were found to have been interred within it. While both adults and children were buried within many Fort Ancient mounds, the presence of many infant bodies in the Turpin mound distinguishes it from some other mounds of the period. Unlike many Fort Ancient mounds, this mound was found to include no structures underneath the actual mound, and few bodies were accompanied by grave goods.

== Contemporary understanding ==
The professional excavations of the twentieth century revealed that the Turpin Site was primarily a Fort Ancient village, although some Late Woodland influence was also present. Writing in 1966, archaeologist James Griffin classified Turpin and the nearby Sand Ridge site within the Madisonville Focus of the Fort Ancient culture. Twenty years later, a study of the chronology of the Fort Ancient culture assigned Turpin to the Early Fort Ancient period and the Madisonville site to the Late Fort Ancient period. The typical resident of an Early Fort Ancient village lived in a single-family house, unlike the larger multiple-family houses found at villages such as the Madisonville site in Mariemont, just across the Little Miami River from Newtown.

Based on artifacts found at the site, such as decorated ceramics and tempered pottery, the study's author concluded that the site's inhabitants were influenced by Mississippian groups such as the people of the Angel phase. Among the distinctive features of Turpin pottery is the presence of guilloché whose holes include smaller holes at their centers; this feature has also been found at two other sites in the valley of the Little Miami. Writing in 1986, Wesley Cowan proposed Turpin as a type site for a phase of the Fort Ancient culture in southwestern Ohio, lasting from AD 1000 to 1250.

== Recognition ==
As one of southwestern Ohio's more significant archaeological sites, the Turpin Site has been used as a benchmark for the study of other Fort Ancient sites in the Ohio River watershed. In 2007, Kathleen Brady-Rawlins made extensive use of data from Turpin in her post excavation analysis of the O.C. Voss Site in western Franklin County, along with other sites in southern and central Ohio. Furthermore, the site has been recognized as worthy of prehistoric preservation by the National Park Service; it was listed on the National Register of Historic Places in 1974. Four other sites in the Newtown vicinity, including the Madisonville site, are also listed on the National Register. The Turpin Site and the surrounding farm are still owned by the Turpin family, which grows sod on the property.
