= Ferris wheel (disambiguation) =

A Ferris wheel is a type of amusement ride.

Ferris wheel may also refer to:

- Ferris Wheel (1893), the original Chicago Wheel, built by George Washington Gale Ferris Jr.
- The Ferris Wheel (film), a 1993 Swedish drama

== Music ==
- The Ferris Wheel (band), a 1966–1970 British rock and soul group with an eponymous 1970 album
- The Ferris Wheel (album), by Mad at the World, 1993
- "Ferris Wheel", a song by Conrad Sewell from Precious, 2023
- "Ferris Wheel", a song by Donovan from Sunshine Superman, 1966
- "Ferris Wheel", a song by Imagine Dragons from Mercury – Acts 1 & 2, 2022
- "Ferris Wheel", a song by Tory Lanez from Love Me Now?, 2018
- "Ferris Wheel", a track by Toby Fox from Deltarune Chapter 2 OST, 2021

== See also ==
- Ferris (disambiguation)
- Ferris Wheel on Fire, a 2011 EP by Neutral Milk Hotel
- List of Ferris wheels
