= Mariemont Historic District =

Historic district in Ohio, United States

- Mariemont Historic District; Village of Mariemont
- U.S. National Register of Historic Places
- U.S. National Historic Landmark District
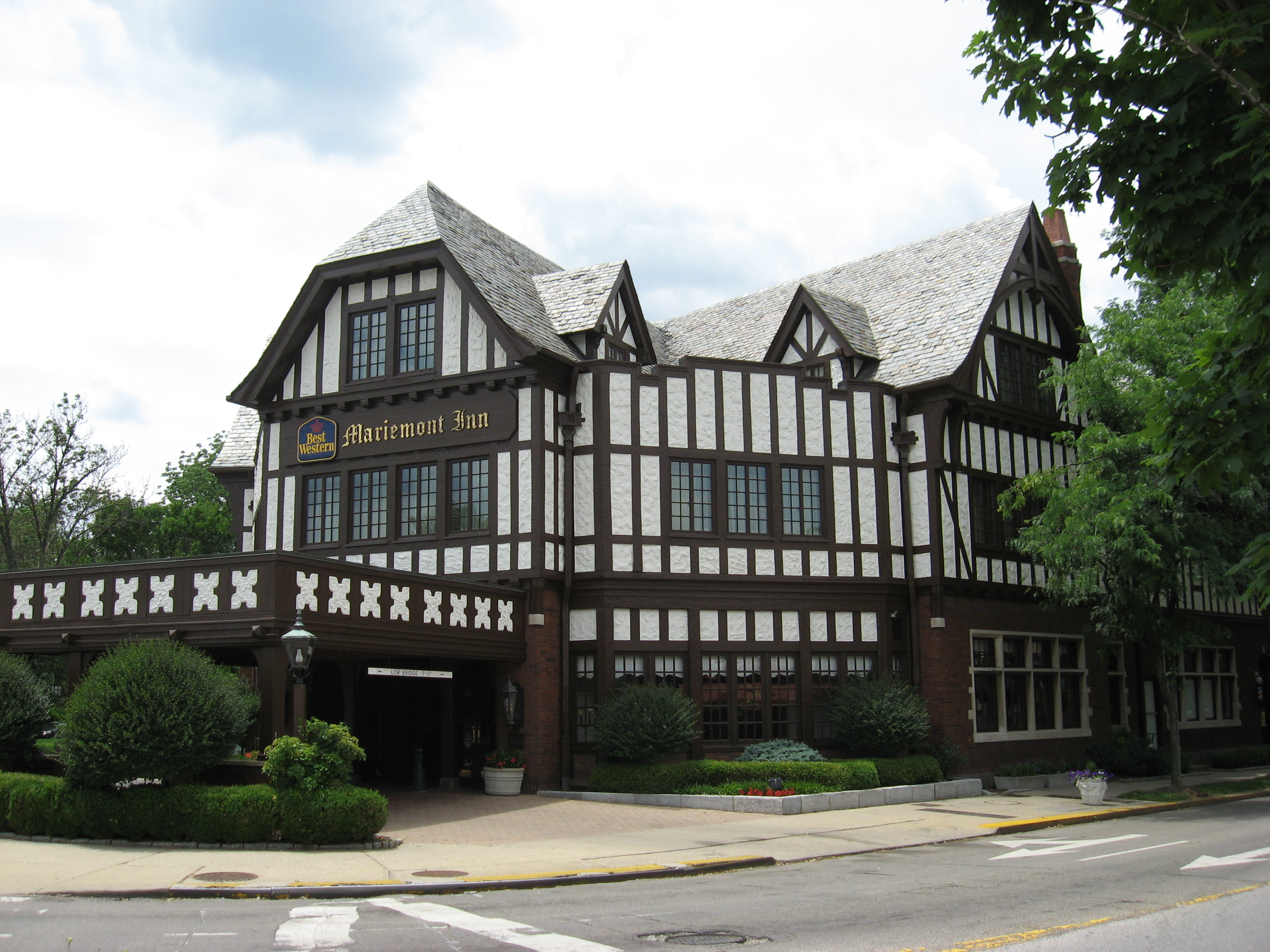
- The Mariemont Inn

- Location within Ohio Location within the United States
- Location: Most of the village of Mariemont, Ohio
- Coordinates: 39°08′42″N 84°22′25″W
- Area: 319 acres (129 ha) (1979 listing); 525 acres (212 ha) (2007 landmark size)
- Architect: John Nolen
- Architectural style: American colonial and Greek Revival
- NRHP reference No.: 79001862 (original); 07000431 (increase)

Significant dates
- Added to NRHP: July 24, 1979
- Boundary increase: March 29, 2007
- Designated NHLD: March 29, 2007

The Mariemont Historic District is a National Historic Landmark District encompassing most of the municipality of Mariemont, Ohio, USA. Mariemont was planned and developed in the 1920s by philanthropist Mary Emery and landscape architect John Nolen, and was one of the nation's first planned suburban communities. Its architecture and streetscape are still strongly evocative of its original plans. A large portion of the community was listed on the National Register of Historic Places in 1979; a larger area (fully encompassing the first listing) was designated a National Historic Landmark (as Village of Mariemont) in 2007.

== Description and history ==
Mariemont is a village located about 10 miles (16 km) east of downtown Cincinnati in Hamilton County, on United States Route 50 (aka Wooster Pike), which serves as the principal route through the community. The village occupies an area on the north bank of the Little Miami River that is roughly rectangular with protrusions to the north, east and southwest. The bulk of the village is residential, with multifamily housing predominant north of Wooster Pike, and single-family housing to its south. Most of the housing is on winding lanes in a parklike setting; some of it is in a rectilinear grid pattern. Industry is restricted to the southwestern protrusion, known as Westover, which extends between Wooster Pike and a railroad right-of-way on the riverbank. Commercial and retail activity is mainly located on Wooster Pike, with a smaller area at Oak and Chestnut Streets. Architecturally, the village resembles an English country village, with large amounts of Tudor Revival architecture, and a stone English country church.

The village has several large parks. Dogwood Park is on the west side of the village, which houses the memorial carillon, offering concerts on Sundays throughout the summer months. Miami Bluff Drive provides good views over the river, and Mariemont Gardens is an area in the floodplain below the bluff which was used historically as farmland when not flooded. Located on the embankment below the drive is the Madisonville site, a prehistoric Native American site that attracted early American settlers to the area. The village square serves as the community center with red brick Tudor buildings, including the Mariemont Inn and historical Mariemont Barber Shop. Mariemont also has one of the few elected Town Criers remaining in North America.

Mariemont was the brainchild of Mary Emery, a philanthropist seeking to alleviate housing shortages and poor housing conditions after World War I. Working with Charles Livingood, she retained landscape architect John Nolen to draft a comprehensive plan for the village, in which the location and nature of a great deal of its infrastructure was specified. The plan was accepted in 1921, and development took place mostly over the following decade. The Mariemont Company, formed and managed by Emery and Livingood, oversaw the development until 1931, when it was formally dissolved and most of its tangible assets were turned over to the community. The company hired architects from major eastern cities to design buildings of all types in the village.

In the decades following the village's creation, development has continued, although at a restrained pace. The village has grown by acquisition of land surrounding its original planned area, and portions of Nolen's design were either not fully implemented, or have undergone subsequent alteration that is not in keeping with the plan. These are generally small and the alterations are rarely intrusive. When the village was surveyed for National Historic Landmark designation in the early 2000s, the only areas of the village that were omitted from the landmarked area were the hospital and high school areas in the east, and small areas north of the historic bounds.the high school's design reflected some rather radical architectural and educational ideas not in keeping with the traditional architecture of the village. The 1979 National Register nomination omitted slightly larger sections in the same area, as well as the entire Mariemont Gardens area, which is separated from the balance of the village by railroad tracks.

== Architects ==
Architects who did work in Mariemont include Louis E. Jallade, Robert Rodes McGoodwin, Jack E. Hodell, and Ripley and LeBoutillier.

== See also ==
- Mariemont Embankment and Village Site, aka the Madisonville site, located on the riverbank in the village
- List of National Historic Landmarks in Ohio
