= Hobson site =

Archaeological site in Ohio, US

Hobson Site
- Approximate location within Ohio today
- 38°58′59.74″N 82°4′45.44″W
- Periods: Feurt Phase
- Cultures: Fort Ancient culture
- Location: Middleport, Ohio, Meigs County, Ohio, US
- Region: Meigs County, Ohio

History
- Built: 1300 CE
- Abandoned: 1400 CE

The Hobson Site (33MS2) is a Native American archaeological site located 1.5 miles (2.4 km) below Middleport, Ohio on the north bank of the Ohio River. It has minor traces of Archaic, Woodland and Late Prehistoric artifacts. However, the largest component is a small village and cemetery of the Feurt Phase of the Fort Ancient culture originally estimated to date to 1100 to 1200 CE. More recent radiocarbon-dating has provided a date of 1350 CE.

== Abstract ==
The type of earlier pottery, in quoting James L. Murphy, "cannot be distinguished from the late Middle Woodland Watson Ware of the upper Ohio Valley nor from the Late Woodland Peters Cordmarked Ware from the Scioto and Hocking Valley drainages". Murphy, in 1968, explained the dominance at the site of smooth-surfaced shell-tempered sherds has an even more striking similarity between the Hobson Site and the components in the Hocking Valley of the Fort Ancient Tradition. The archaeologist found 791 plain, shell tempered body sherds. Ten fragments of pottery were found having thick strap handles and two lug handles, with punctate and incised decoration. These sherds most closely resemble ceramic material from the Feurt Phase of the Scioto and Hocking valleys.

The artifacts of flint, hematite, animal bone, shell and pottery were typical of the Feurt Phase of the Fort Ancient Tradition. The majority of the Hobson flint arrowheads were elongated and triangular shaped with straight or concave sides and convex bases.

== Material tradition ==
As with other phases within the contemporaneous Fort Ancient Tradition, local freshwater shell was used for tools and jewelry. Animal bone and shell were used for garden hoes. Animal bone was shaped for use as tools. These included awls, punches, fish hooks, bone needles, and hide scrapers. Animal bone artifacts included beads, hair pins, pendants, and tinklers. The vertebrate fauna at Hobson was dominated by deer and turkey but also included raccoon, elk, fish, and turtle.

== Burial ==
Construction and looting at the site destroyed all but one of the human burials before excavation could be undertaken. The single Hobson Site burial retrieved during archaeological investigations was semiflexed, with knees removed by historic era plowing. The male was estimated at 22–23 years of age and had ankylosis of the vertebrae from the second cervical to the third thoracic being fused. Two of the skeleton's lumbar vertebrae were penetrated by triangular flint arrow points.
