= Buckner site =

Archaeological site in Kentucky, U.S.

- Buckner Site (15BB12)
- U.S. National Register of Historic Places
- Nearest city: Paris, Kentucky
- NRHP reference No.: 83002557
- Added to NRHP: January 27, 1983

The Buckner Site (15BB12) is a Middle Fort Ancient culture (1200 to 1400 CE) archaeological site located on Strodes Creek in Bourbon County, Kentucky, United States. It has two large circular village areas, each surrounding its own central plaza and several smaller special use areas to the north and northeast of the site.

The site was excavated during the 1930s by William S. Webb as salvage archaeology operations during the Great Depression. It was added to the National Register of Historic Places on January 27, 1983.
