= Boonshoft Museum of Discovery =

Children's museum in Dayton, Ohio, US

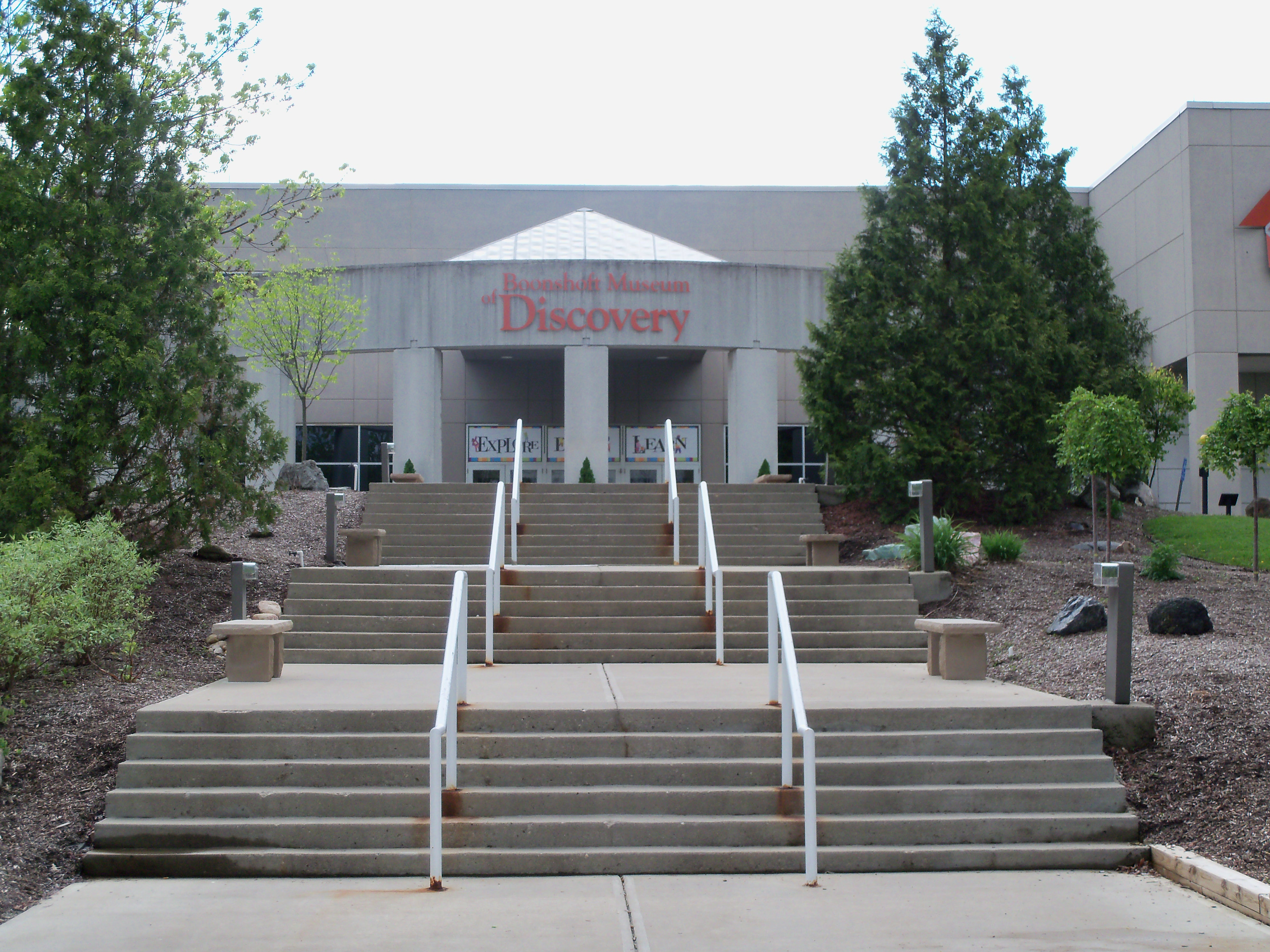
- The main entrance to the Boonshoft Museum of Discovery
- Established: 1893 (Museum of Natural History), 1995 (Boonshoft)
- Location: 2600 Deweese Parkway Dayton, Ohio
- Coordinates: 39.78882°N 84.20179°W
- Website: www.boonshoftmuseum.org

The Boonshoft Museum of Discovery (abbreviated as Boonshoft) is a children's museum, science and technology center and zoo in Dayton, Ohio, United States that focuses on science and natural history. Exhibits include an extensive natural history collection as well as maintaining a collection of live animals native to Ohio and abroad. Educational outreach extends to the community by providing in-school programming and on-site special programs. SunWatch Indian Village is a sister site to the museum.

The museum is accredited by the American Alliance of Museums (AAM), affiliated with the Association of Children's Museums (ACM), and is a governing member of the Association of Science-Technology Centers (ASTC). In addition, the museum's indoor Discovery Zoo is fully accredited by the Association of Zoos and Aquariums. The museum is the only zoo, aquarium, planetarium or science center in Dayton, and also houses the Apollo Observatory, an astronomical observatory operated by the Miami Valley Astronomical Society.

== History ==
The museum was founded in 1893 as the Dayton Museum of Natural History, organizationally part of the Dayton Public Library and Museum. In the 1990s, the Children's Museum of Dayton and the Dayton Museum of Natural History merged with the natural history museum completing major renovations and reopening as the Dayton Museum of Discovery. In 1999, the name was changed to the Boonshoft Museum of Discovery honor of Oscar Boonshoft, who made a significant financial contribution.

In 1960 the museum built a 10 meter wide dome as their planetarium. The planetarium equipment has been updated through the years. As of 1982, they had a Spitz A3P projector. A larger planetarium was built, and in 1991 the planetarium used Digistar II software and as of 2025 has a Digistar 5. Their Apollo Observatory opened in 1961 and a Cassegrain telescope was used to conduct studies about how urban settings may impact astronomical research.

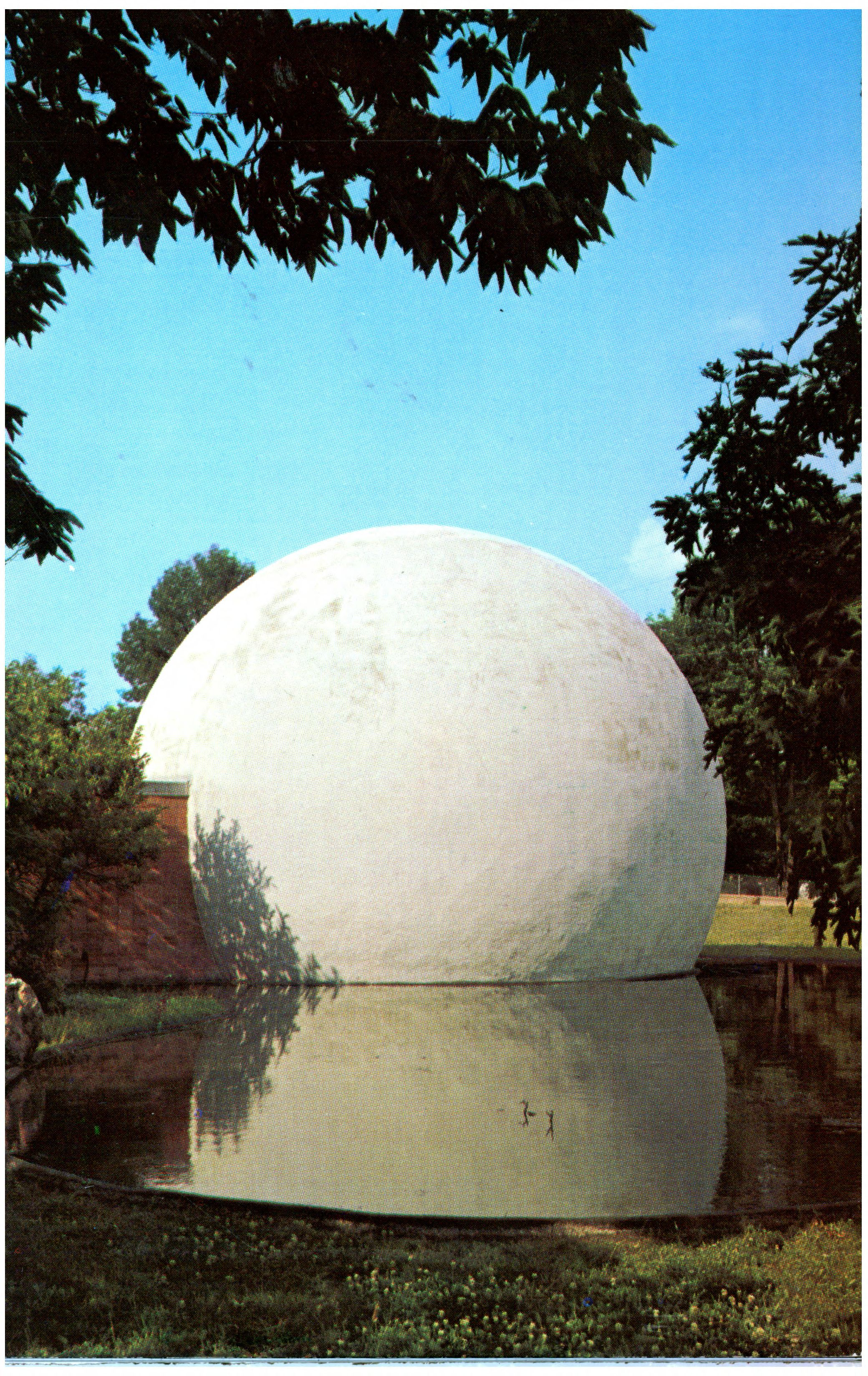
Dayton Museum of National History, Dayton, Ohio - DPLA - 2a5573c3c669efa8c5533cf56eb506cc (page 1)

In March 2013, the Dayton Society of Natural History opened a satellite version of their main museum, called the Boonshoft Museum of Discovery Springfield, in an approximately 4000-square-foot space in the Upper Valley Mall near Springfield, moving to 20,000 square feet in the former Elder-Beerman space in November. On March 25, 2016, the Dayton Society of Natural History announced that it would close this satellite museum; it did so on April 30.

From 2009 through at least 2018, the Boonshoft managed the Fort Ancient Earthworks site outside of Lebanon, Ohio, in an agreement with the Ohio History Connection, as a second sister site alongside SunWatch. By 2023, Fort Ancient management returned to the Ohio History Connection.

== Permanent museum exhibits ==
Science On a Sphere is a 68-inch-diameter (1.7 m) globe, suspended in mid-air, capable of showing dynamic visualizations of Earth and space. It also has the capability of showing commercial air traffic around the world while presenting other things such as turtle migrations.

Hall of the Universe is an exhibit where interactive learning can take place about the Solar System. Also contains the Exoplanet Exploration exhibit.

Explorers Crossing consists of a play veterinary clinic, recycling center and landfill, pizza kitchen, car repair shop, and more where children can learn, role play, and interact with hundreds of different pieces to learn more about associated topics within each setting.

Oscar Boonshoft Science Central is an exhibit that contains a water table where children can learn about water and its properties, a manipulative area where children can learn about points, lines, and curves through rubber band art, a demonstrative laboratory, and several other interactive areas.

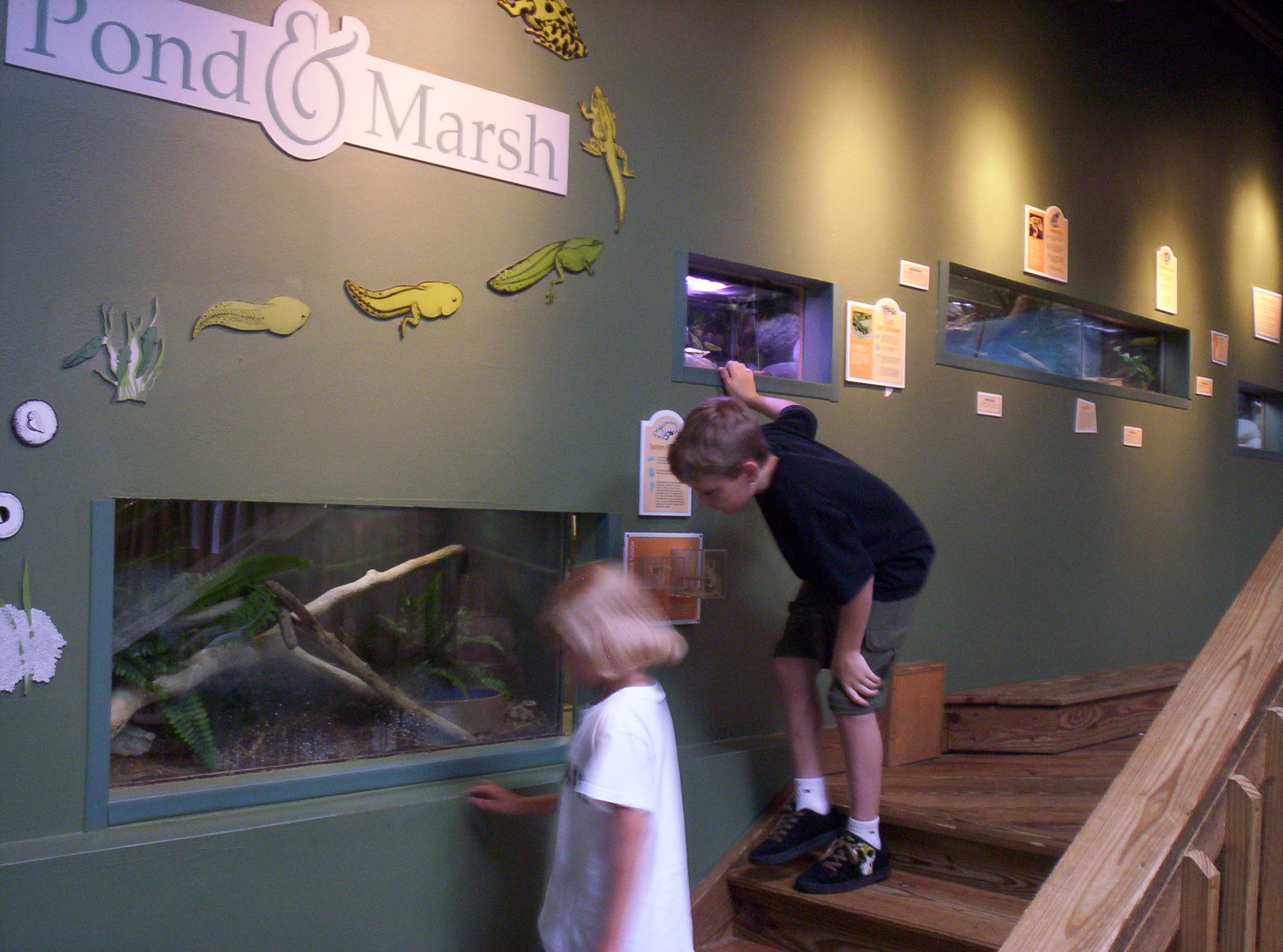
Children in the Discovery Zoo exhibit

Nesiur the Mummy is an exhibit that contains a mummy donated to the museum from Egypt, and other African pieces.

Mead Tree House is a fully enclosed tree house where children can learn about environmental preservation and use binoculars to do bird watching through windows within the tree house.

The Tidal Pool is an exhibit that contains live marine invertebrates native to the Pacific Northwest, such as starfish. The exhibit is run by a museum employee or volunteer.

The Bieser Discovery Center is an exhibit that contains thousands of real specimens such as animal skeletons, shells, and fossils. Also located in the exhibit are live snakes, including a burmese python. Along with these things are many science related children's books.

The Discovery Zoo is an indoor zoo that is fully accredited by the Association of Zoos and Aquariums (AZA) that showcases mammals, reptiles, birds, and amphibians with special adaptations for survival. The Discovery Zoo is home to over 150 animals including a Linne's two-toed sloth, bat-eared foxes, North American river otters, African meerkats, and more recently a Mertens's water monitor named Nessie. Although the museum does not itself rehabilitate injured animals, many of the animals, including the zoo's Virginia opossum, came to the zoo after being injured in the wild and rehabilitated elsewhere, and would be unable to survive on their own. Two otters currently live in the zoo, and are part of a national breeding program; their names are Eno and Sikwa. The Discovery zoo was renovated in 2010 to expand its capacity and recreate a new style to the zoo. The project also included the addition of around 18 new species of animals to the zoo. The Boonshoft Museum of Discovery is one of only four museums in the United States that are accredited as an official zoo. The renovation project came at a cost of $1 million.

== Activities ==
=== Scientific Research ===
As a scientific organization, staff and researchers connected to the museum's anthropology, paleontology, biology, astronomy, and zoology departments have contributed to scientific research in their prospective fields. Articles referencing their research or documenting the specimens held within the collection of the museum are cited in several publications.

=== Educational Outreach ===
In the 1970s, the museum published handbooks on various scientific topics, including environmental preservation which were geared towards both amateurs and professionals interested in learning more about the subject matter.

In addition to the Apollo Observatory, which is available to the public for viewing, the museum maintains the Junior Observing and Training Station, which was built in 1971 to provide opportunity for young people to volunteer.

The Boonshoft Museum of Discovery is a popular spot for school field trips. In addition to school field trips, the museum has a program called Exhibits-To-Go which are a set of exhibits that can be taken directly to school classrooms in the Dayton area.

Each day the staff presents special programs such as hands-on science experiments, otter feedings, Planetarium shows, story times, and bird watching (at the Mead Tree House), Science on a Sphere live presentations, and visits with live animals.

== Events ==
The museum hosts many special events each year, such as Red White & Boonshoft, GeekFest, and Eureka!. The Education Department also holds large-scale activities in support of Biology, Nanotechnology and Chemistry, and the Astronomy Department holds Astronomy Day and special Friday night star gazing events.

== The future ==
In 2010, NASA awarded more than $800,000 to the Boonshoft Museum of Discovery for the creation of an Exoplanet Exploration exhibit.

Along with the museum's permanent exhibits, there are also traveling exhibits that are commonly presented at the museum.

In the wake of the 2016 closure of the satellite museum at the Upper Valley Mall, the Dayton Society of Natural History had considered relocating the Boonshoft Museum of Discovery Springfield into a building on South Fountain Avenue in downtown Springfield. The society estimated it would have needed to raise $2 million for building renovations and $2 million for an endowment to operate the satellite. Renovations were to begin in early 2017, with reopening expected in late 2017 or early 2018. In July 2016 the society decided against this location because of the cost and the short timeframe for fundraising. The society and Springfield leaders reported that they were still working together to find another location. In 2017 some renovations and exhibits were moved and changed. Notably the courthouse and grocery store were removed, the pizza kitchen was moved where the court house was, a shape shop was opened and the Vet Hospital was moved to the old grocery store and expanded. In late 2018 and early 2019 renovations on the lobby, restrooms and education labs began.

== See also ==
- SunWatch Indian Village
- List of astronomical observatories
- List of museums in Ohio
- List of planetariums
