= Apollo Observatory =

Observatory in Ohio, US

- Alternative names: Dayton Observatory
- Organization: Miami Valley Astronomical Society
- Observatory code: 838
- Location: Dayton, OH
- Coordinates: 39.788823°N 84.201794°W
- Website: mvas.org/node/156

Telescopes
- Unnamed Telescope: 50cm Dall-Kirkham Cassegrainian Reflector

Apollo Observatory is an astronomical observatory owned by Boonshoft Museum of Discovery and operated by the Miami Valley Astronomical Society at Boonshoft Museum of Discovery. The observatory is located at Boonshoft Museum of Discovery in Dayton, Ohio, United States.

== History and Details ==
The observatory is named after Project Apollo and was dedicated in 1969. Because of its location in the vicinity of a major Air Force research and development arm at Wright-Patterson Air Force Base (WPAFB), it has benefited from an infusion of top-notch technical talent. With funds raised by both the Museum and the Miami Valley Astronomical Society (MVAS), a design by Richard Buchroeder was selected and built by members of the Society, many of whom worked in optics and engineering disciplines for the Air Force. Due to the selected design, the optical train was complex and turned out to be problematic to maintain. It was therefore later modified to a simpler Dall-Kirkham Cassegrainian design.

The original building and the 50 cm (20-inch) telescope located in the dome were designed under the advice and guidance of MVAS members. The original building contained an optical laboratory complete with a shock-isolated optical test bench. It also contained space on the first floor where mirror grinding and polishing was performed.

The remodeling of the Museum in 1991 resulted in the addition of a Digistar Planetarium at the expense of the MVAS optical shop areas.

The second floor of the Apollo Observatory contains a large meeting room where monthly meetings and social gatherings are held. Adjacent to the meeting room is the MVAS library where members may check out most of the holdings for their use. The 50 cm telescope is also located on the second floor, just to the south of the meeting room.

The MVAS claims that the 50 cm telescope is one of the largest telescopes available to the amateur astronomer in southwest Ohio, although increased light pollution combined with the thermal effects of the building limit its usefulness for serious amateur study.

== See also ==
- List of astronomical observatories
