= Leo Petroglyph =

Archaeological site in Ohio, United States

- U.S. National Register of Historic Places
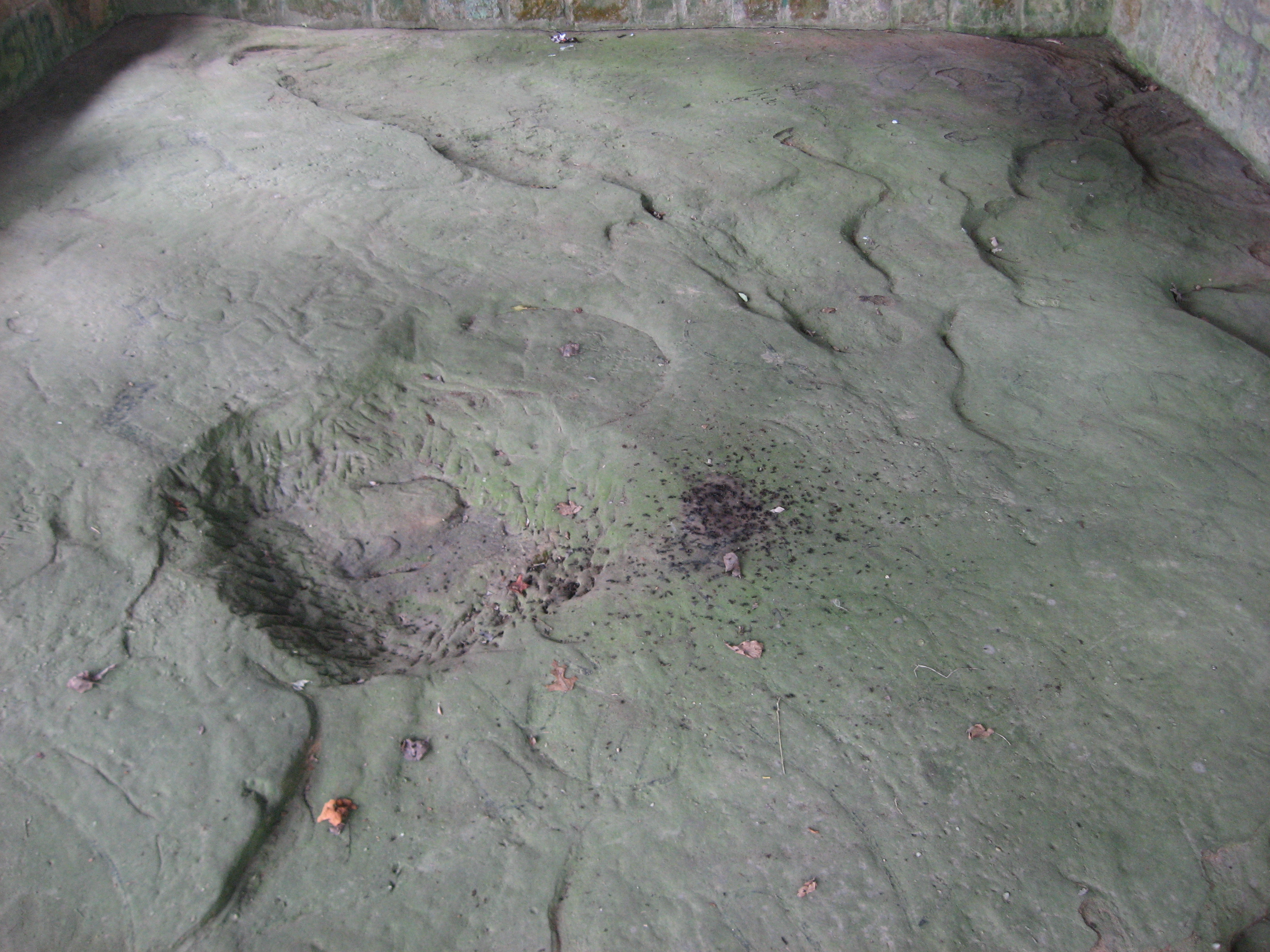
- Comprehensive view of the petroglyph site

- Location within Ohio Location within the United States
- Nearest city: Coalton, Ohio
- Coordinates: 39°9′2.91″N 82°40′29.29″W
- Area: 12.3 acres (5.0 ha)
- NRHP reference No.: 70000501
- Added to NRHP: November 10, 1970

The Leo Petroglyph is a sandstone petroglyph containing 37 images of humans and other animals as well as footprints of each. The petroglyph is located near the small village of Leo, Ohio (in Jackson County, Ohio) and is thought to have been created by the Fort Ancient peoples (possibly AD 1000–1650). The area in which the sandstone petroglyph was found is on the edge of an unglaciated Mississippian sandstone cliff 20–65 feet (6.1–19.8 m) high. A 20 by 16 feet (6.1 m × 4.9 m) slab containing the 37 carvings is protected by a wooden shelter, a Works Progress Administration project. The meanings of the drawings are unknown. On November 10, 1970, it was added to the National Register of Historic Places. The site is maintained by the Ohio History Connection.

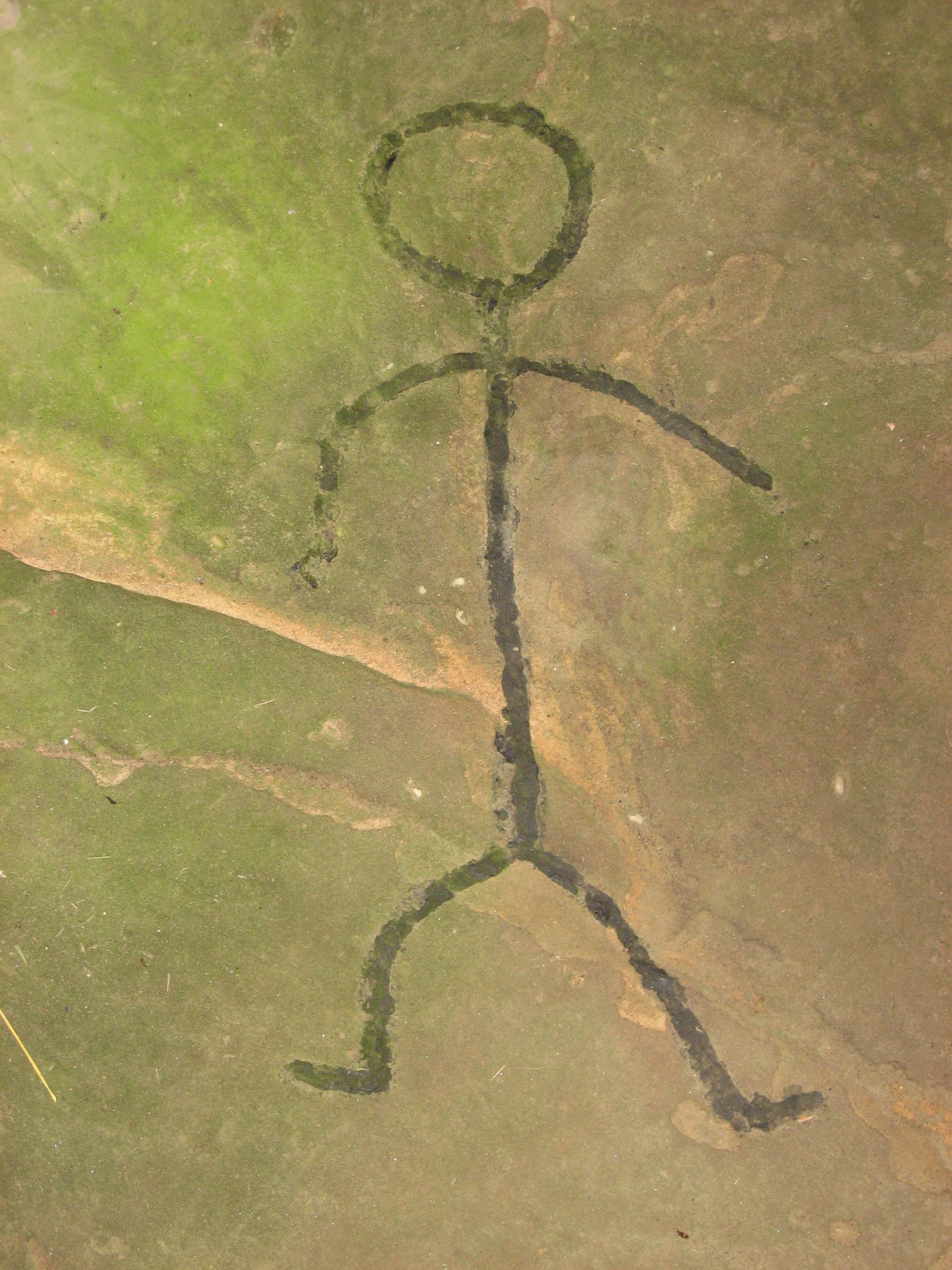
A human figure petroglyph
