= Joseph Ferris House =

Historic house in Ohio, United States

- U.S. National Register of Historic Places
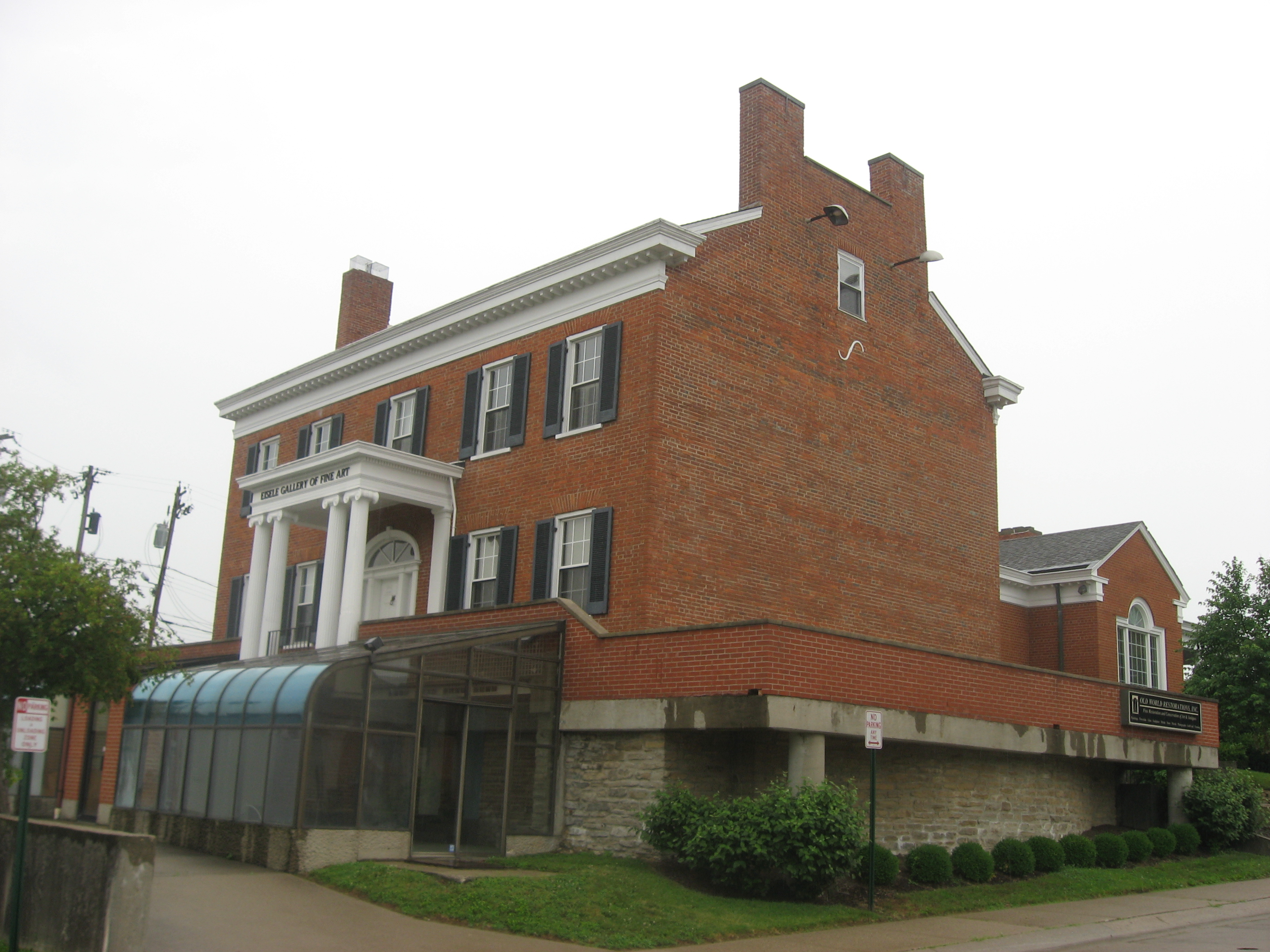
- Front and side of the house

- Location within Ohio Location within the United States
- Location: 5729 Dragon Way, Cincinnati, Ohio
- Coordinates: 39°8′28″N 84°23′31″W
- Area: less than one acre
- Built: 1820
- Architect: Joseph Ferris
- Architectural style: Greek Revival
- NRHP reference No.: 75001417
- Added to NRHP: June 30, 1975

Joseph Ferris House is a registered historic building in Cincinnati, Ohio, listed in the National Register on June 30, 1975. It is in the village of Fairfax, about 1 mile south of Mariemont.

Joseph Ferris and his brothers Eliphalet and Andrew came from Connecticut to the then Northwest Territory in 1799.

== Historic uses ==
- Single dwelling
