= Ferris =

Ferris may refer to:

== People and fictional characters ==
- Ferris (name), a list of people and fictional characters with either the given name or surname
- Ferris MC, stage name of German rapper Sascha Reimann (born 1973)
- Ferris Bueller, stage name of Soren Buehler, former member of the German band Scooter

== Places in the United States ==
- Ferris, Illinois, a village
- Ferris, Texas, a city
- Ferris Township, Michigan
- Ferris Lake, New York
- Ferris Formation, a geological formation in Wyoming

== Education ==
- Ferris Independent School District, Ferris, Texas, United States
- Ferris State University, Michigan, United States
- Ferris University, private women's college in Yokohama, Kanagawa, Japan

== Other uses ==
- Ferris, unofficial mascot of the Rust programming language

== See also ==
- Ferris House (disambiguation)
- Ferris wheel (disambiguation)
