= Prather Site =

Archaeological site in Indiana, USA

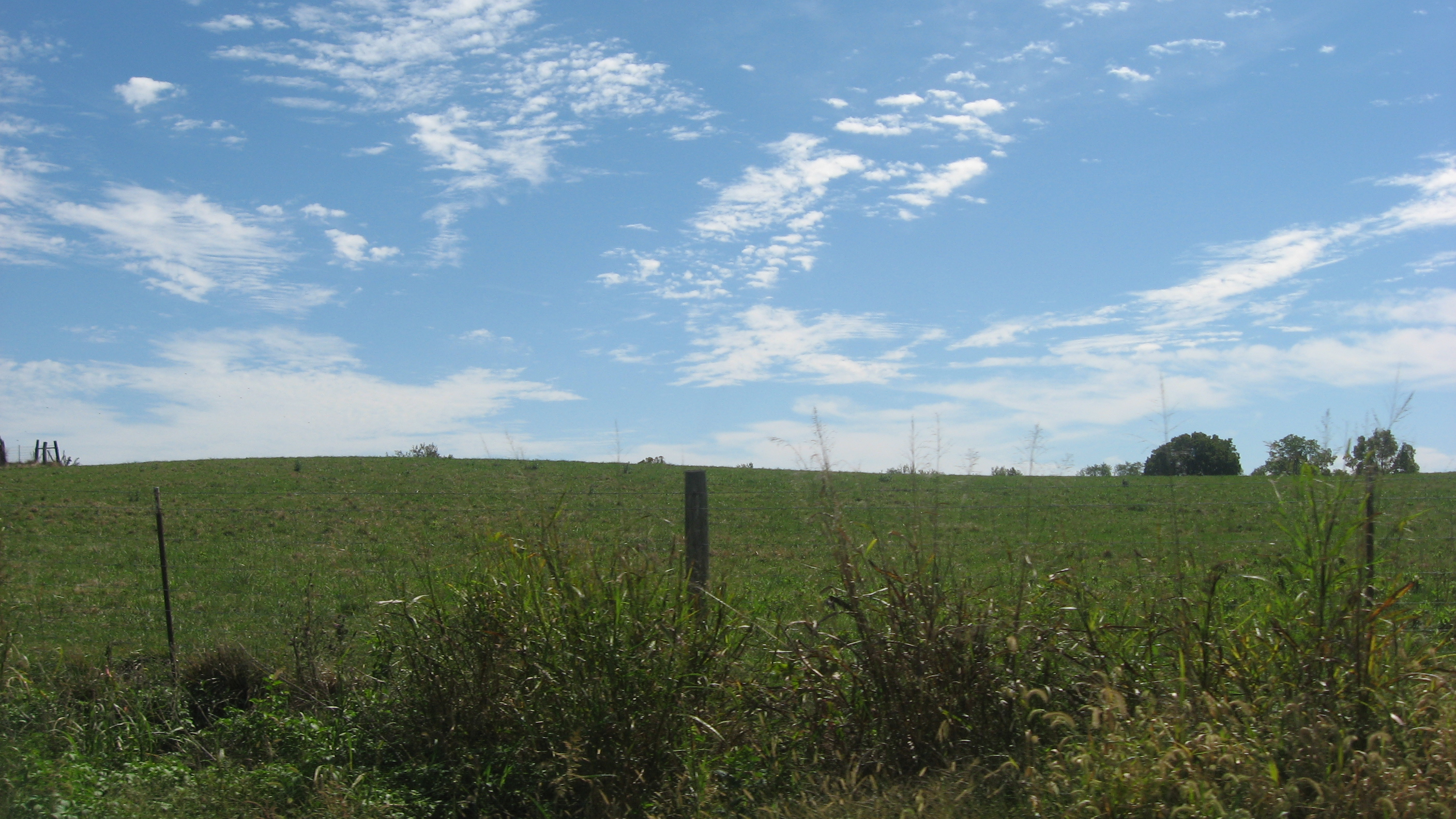
- A field at the site

- Location within Indiana today
- 38°22′40.80″N 85°41′41.82″W
- Cultures: Middle Mississippian culture
- Location: Jeffersonville, Indiana, Clark County, Indiana, USA
- Region: Clark County, Indiana

History
- Built: 1000 CE
- Abandoned: 1180 CE

Site notes
- Architectural styles: platform mounds, palisade,

The Prather Site (12CL4) is a Middle Mississippian culture archaeological site located in the Falls of the Ohio region in Clark County, Indiana. It was the principal ceremonial center of the Prather Complex, the northeasternmost regional variant of the Mississippian cultures. It also bordered on several Upper Mississippian cultures, including the Fort Ancient peoples of Southern Indiana, Southern Ohio and Northeastern Kentucky.

== Site description ==
The Prather Site is located 4.9 kilometres (3.0 mi) west of the Ohio River and 2.4 kilometres (1.5 mi) east of Silver Creek on a loess-capped upland ridge. It is unusual for a Mississippian mound center to be located in the upland area rather than the alluvial valley closer to the river, but the site is watered by permanent natural springs and shallow streams. Other sites in the complex to the northeast of the site are also situated primarily in the uplands, while those to the south and southwest are located in the alluvial valley. This implies the inhabitants of the area may have settled farther back from the river in an attempt to avoid contact with people traveling on the river, trading the richer soils and marine resources for this added safety.

The site itself consists of a 5.2 hectares (0.052 km^{2}) residential village area surrounding four platform mounds arranged in a roughly rectangular pattern around a central plaza area. Dating done from samples obtained from the largest mound indicate it was used from approximately 1000 to 1180 CE. It is possible this area was surrounded by a palisade, although currently one has not been located.

The site is located next to Indiana State Road 62, immediately west of the former Indiana Army Ammunition Plant. Until relatively recently the area was rural but residential and industrial encroachment is rapidly changing the area. Multiple modern development are planned for the area, including a new bridge over the Ohio River and new housing developments, that could have significant impact on the site and currently threaten its preservation as a viable archaeological site.

== Excavations ==
The site has undergone several site surveys and some excavations during its modern history. Eli Lilly and the Indiana Historical Society employed E.Y. Guernsey to carry out surveys and excavations at Clark County sites in the early 1930s. He noted three of the mounds at the site, the smallest of which he partially excavated and the largest he examined. Guernsey noted several different types of mortuary practices at the sites, including stone box graves and several flexed and extended burials beneath a fired clay floor. He also discovered typical Mississippian culture pottery, known for its use of crushed marine shells as a tempering agent, a stone discoidal associated with the game of chunkey, a shell gorget and a copper-covered, carved wooden raptorial bird covered in beaten copper. The present whereabouts of all of the artifacts he collected are not currently known, but some are curated at the Glenn Black Laboratory of Archaeology at Indiana University-Bloomington, and at the University of Michigan Museum of Anthropology.

Several amateur archaeologists occasionally dug at the site over the years after Guernsey, but the next major professional archaeological work at the site was a field school held by Donald Janzen in 1971. He reported one large single mound at the site. He also found sections of a wall trench structure dating ton approximately 1045 CE, and examples Mississippian pottery. Among ceramics found were Mississippian plain pottery, some rare decorated examples with incised lines and red filming, and a fragment of a black-on-buff negative painted bottle.

The next major excavations at the site were undertaken in 2003 by Cheryl Munson and Robert McCullough, with funding provided by the National Park Service and administered by the Indiana Division of Historic Preservation and Archaeology.

== Prather complex ==
The Prather complex (or "Falls Mississippian" ) is the northeasternmost variant of the Middle Mississippian culture. It is a group of sites located in the Falls of the Ohio region of central Kentucky and southern Indiana. It is separated from the next closest Mississippian variant, the Angel phase centered on the Angel Mounds site near Evansville, Indiana, down the Ohio River approximately 85 kilometres (53 mi) to the southwest. The section of the river between the two was an empty buffer zone. Another empty buffer zone stretched 95 kilometres (59 mi) up the Ohio River to the northeast, separating the peoples of the Prather complex from Fort Ancient culture populations. Although it is possible these empty zones were for social or political reasons, it may also be because the narrowing of the alluvial valley upstream and downstream of the Falls region made it less suitable for the intensive maize agriculture practiced by the societies. The Falls region is the only wide expanse of bottom land flood terrace in between the Little Miami River at Cincinnati, Ohio (occupied by Fort Ancient peoples) and the Anderson River near Evansville, Indiana (occupied by the Angel phase). This expanse of flood plain is similar to areas occupied by classic Mississippian sites in the Midwest and Southeast.

The Prather, Willey, Spangler-Koons, and Newcomb/Elrod/Hale are the largest sites of the complex. Other smaller sites include the Ellingsworth, Smith, Clark's Point, Devil's Backbone, Eva Bandman, and Shippingport sites.

Although the Prather site may have been the center of ceremony and politics for the complex, the presence of stone box graves at several of the sites in the complex such as Willey and Spangler-Koons suggest that mortuary rituals may not have been centralized at the site.

== See also ==
- List of Mississippian sites
