= Feurt Mounds and Village Site =

Archaeological site in Ohio, United States

- Feurt Mounds And Village Site
- U.S. National Register of Historic Places
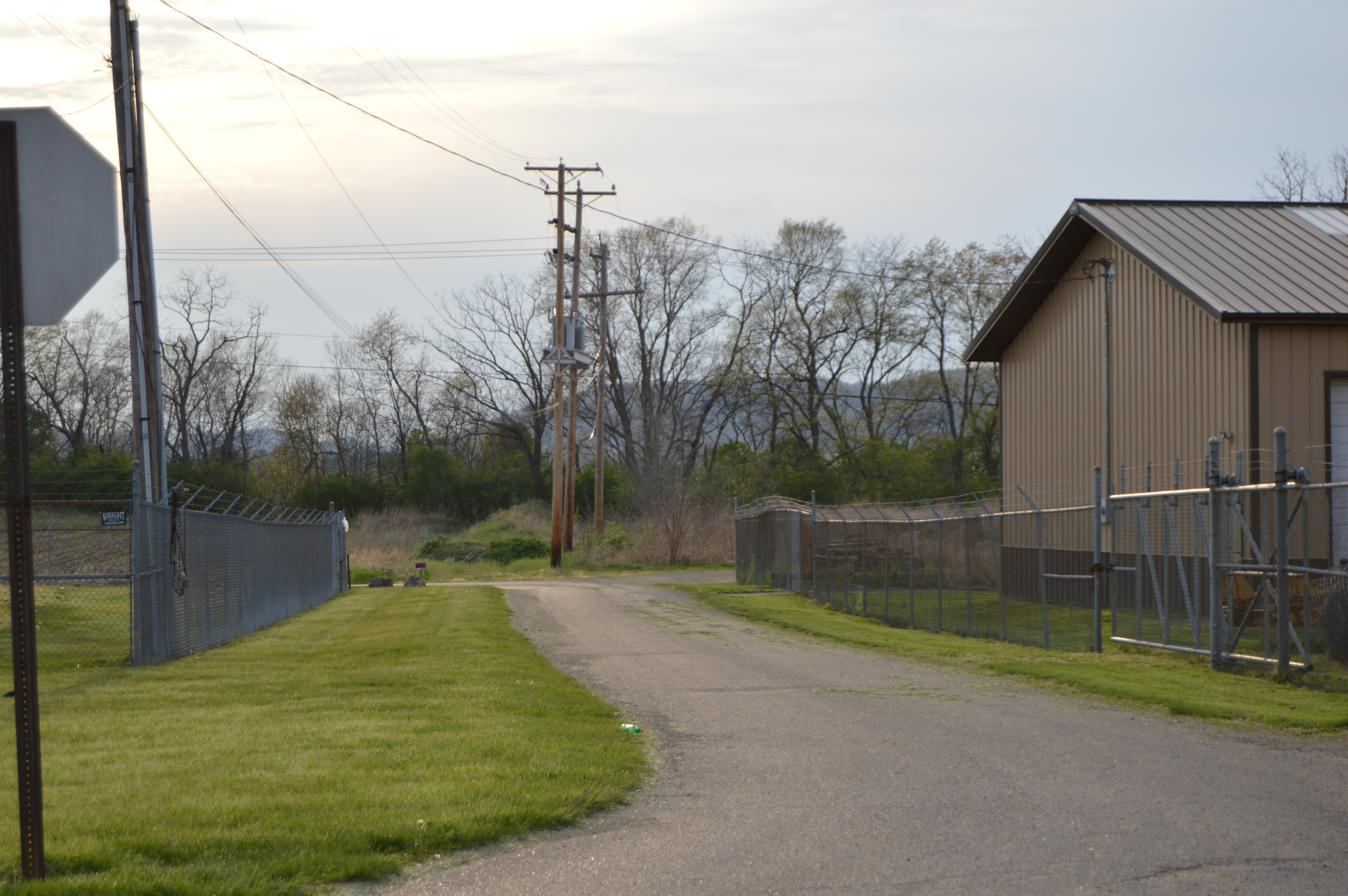
- Overview from east
- Nearest city: Portsmouth, Ohio
- Area: 4 acres (1.6 ha); 11 acres (4.5 ha)
- Architect: Fort Ancient culture
- Architectural style: Burial mound
- NRHP reference No.: 73001531; 75002080
- Added to NRHP: June 18, 1973; January 9, 1975

The Feurt Mounds and Village Site is a Fort Ancient culture archaeological site with three burial mounds and an associated village, located in Clay Township in Scioto County, Ohio.

== History ==
The prehistoric indigenous peoples who constructed the Feurt Mounds lived in the nearby village. They were people belonging to a unique phase in the Fort Ancient Tradition. The Feurt Phase is a longer durational period than some other components of the Fort Ancient Tradition. There are several of these sites located in Southern Ohio and western West Virginia counties scattered along the tributaries of and Ohio River banks.

== Site ==
The three mounds are on the Scioto River, near the Ohio River confluence.

William C. Mills in 1917 described the topography, "The immediate location of the mounds and village site is a level plateau of less than five acres in extent, elevated a little more than forty feet above the bottom land into which it projects, promontory like, with steep and very abrupt banks." This first found Feurt Phase location became the test site, otherwise the basis site, for following discoveries.

=== Mounds ===
The smallest of the three mounds, according to Mr. Moorehead, was seventy-five feet by sixty feet and two and three-fourths feet high. A total of 107 skeletons were buried in this small mound (Mills 1917:310).

The second mound was the highest mound about eight feet high (Mills 1917:319). About half of it was fallen over the hill. One hundred and thirty seven burials were found. A triangular arrow point was found embedded in the head of adult No. 43 (Mills 1917:320). A curious comment of Mills, "'fireplace of a tepee site on the base line or floor.'"

The third mound was six feet high and 90 feet (27 m) by 112 feet (34 m) at the base. It contained 101 burials (Mills 1917:322). These were adolescent and adults alike in a flex position. Among the adornment were beads.

=== Material tradition ===
As with other phases within the contemporaneous Fort Ancient culture, local stream mussel shell was used for tools and jewelry. Animal bone and shell attached to prepared tree limbs were also used for hoes in their gardens. Animal bone was shaped for use as tools. These included awls, punches, fish hooks, bone needles, and hide scrapers (Griffin 1943). Their jewelry included beads, hair pins, pendants, tinklers, and shell. These were also made of both bone and shell. Gourds from their garden and turtle shell were used for ceremonial rattles.

== Archaeology ==
This first site recognized as such is the Feurt Phase type site of which following discovered sites in this Ohio Valley sub-region are compared. The site was excavated in 1916 by archaeologists who found 345 burials, all but one being in the flexed position. The artifacts of flint, stone, bone, shell and pottery were typical of the Fort Ancient Tradition. The majority of flint arrowheads were elongated and triangular shaped with needle-like points.

Before the site was excavated, cannel coal effigy canines of the carnivora were found by a Mr. Wertz (Mills 1917:307). Fewer were found later according to Mills. The Freut Mound copper found was considered to Mills' opinion acquired by barter. He relates some shell and beads were similar to the corresponding type found nearby at Tremper Mound. The mounds were visited and opened by Prof. Moorehead in the year 1896 (Mills 1917:308).

=== Location ===
The Feurt Mounds and Village Site are situated about three miles (5 km) north off the west side of U.S. 23 near the Clay Township overpass in Scioto County, southern Ohio.

== See also ==
- Fort Ancient Tradition sites
