= Clough Creek =

Stream in Ohio, U.S.

Coordinates: 39°06′27″N 84°24′11″W

Clough Creek is a stream in the U.S. state of Ohio. It is a 5.7-mile (9.2 km) long tributary to the Little Miami River.

Clough Creek is named after Richard Clough Anderson Sr., who surveyed the area in 1793.
