= Leo, Ohio =

- Unincorporated community
- Location within Ohio
- Coordinates: 39°08′53″N 82°40′09″W
- Country: United States
- State: Ohio
- Counties: Jackson
- Elevation: 715 ft (218 m)
- Time zone: UTC-5 (Eastern (EST))
  - Summer (DST): UTC-4 (EDT)
- ZIP code: 45692
- Area code: 740
- GNIS feature ID: 1070814

Leo is an unincorporated community in Jackson Township, Jackson County, Ohio, United States. It is located northwest of Coalton at the intersection of Sour Run Road (County Road 28) and Twin Bridges Road, at 39°08′53″N 82°40′09″W.

The town is best known as the location of the Leo Petroglyph.
