= Eliphalet Ferris House =

Historic house in Ohio, United States

- U.S. National Register of Historic Places
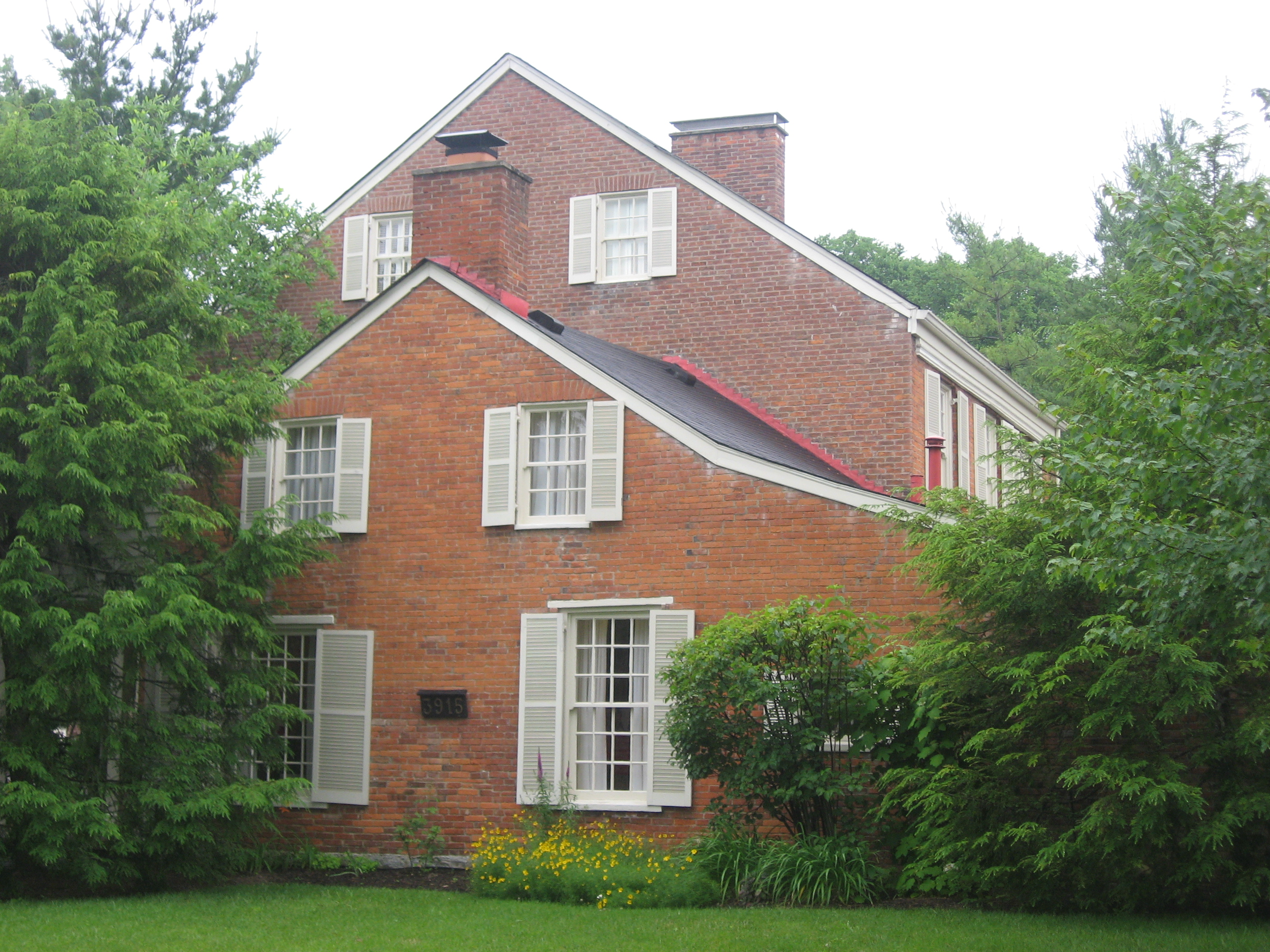
- One end of the house

- Location within Ohio Location within the United States
- Location: 3915 Plainville Rd., Mariemont, Ohio
- Coordinates: 39°8′50″N 84°22′42″W
- Area: less than one acre
- Built: 1802, 1803 or 1812
- NRHP reference No.: 75001431
- Added to NRHP: May 29, 1975

Eliphalet Ferris House is a registered historic building in Mariemont, Ohio, listed in the National Register on May 29, 1975. The house was constructed in 1802 or 1803, or built or expanded in 1812. It was restored in 1927 by Richard H Dana. By 1936 it was in use as the Mariemont Historic Museum, with rooms furnished by the Daughters of the American Revolution.

== Historic and current use ==
- Domestic single dwelling
- Museum
