= Madisonville site =

Archaeological site in Ohio, United States

- Mariemont Embankment and Village Site
- U.S. National Register of Historic Places
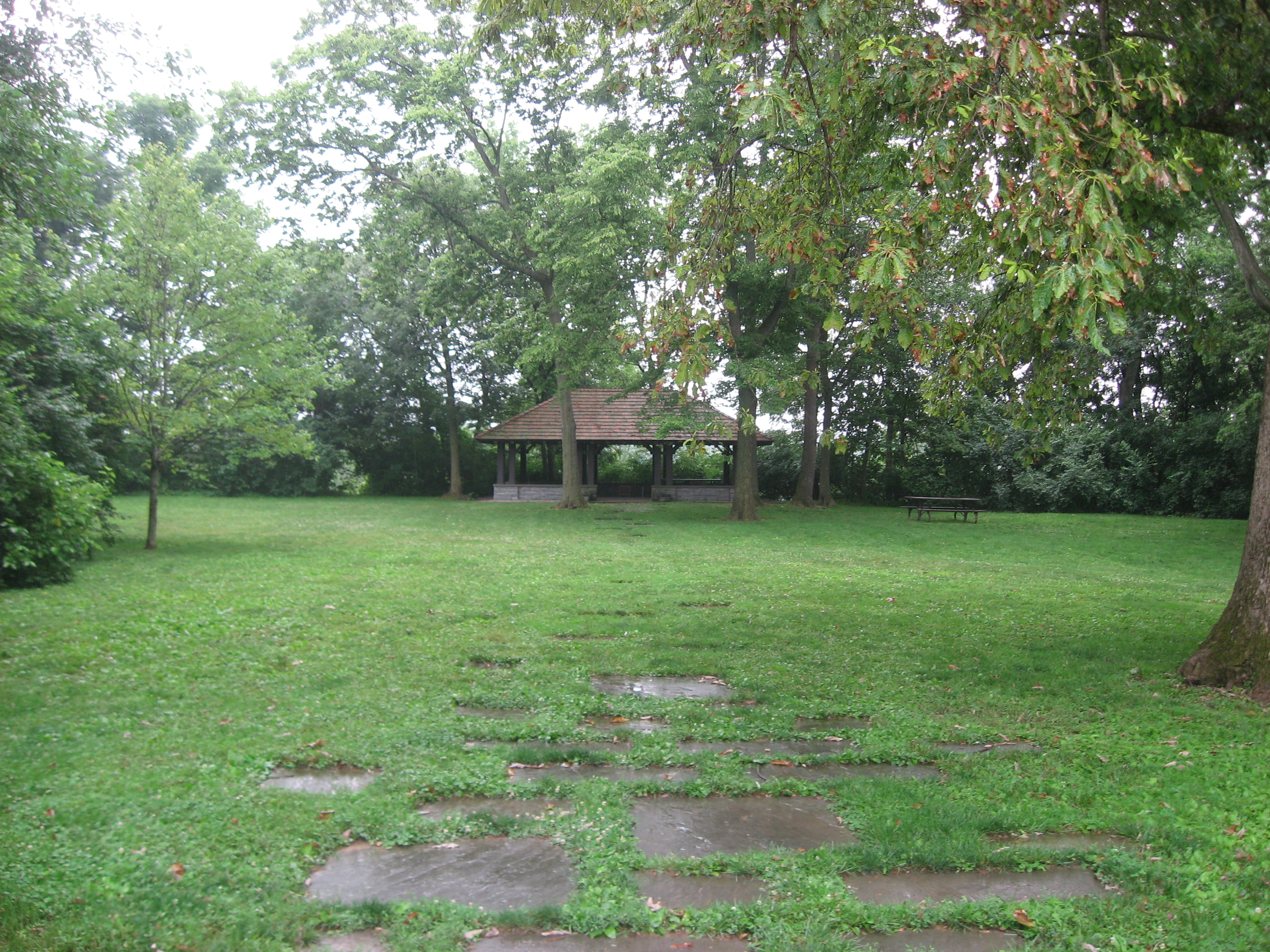
- Overview of the site

- Location within Ohio Location within the United States
- Location: Southern side of Mariemont, above the Little Miami River
- Nearest city: Mariemont, Ohio
- Coordinates: 39°8′27″N 84°22′45″W
- Area: 6 acres (2.4 ha)
- NRHP reference No.: 74001517
- Added to NRHP: October 16, 1974

The Madisonville Site is a prehistoric archaeological site near Mariemont, Ohio, United States. It was listed on the National Register of Historic Places on October 16, 1974 as the "Mariemont Embankment and Village Site".

Madisonville is the type site for the Madisonville phase of Fort Ancient pottery. The 5-acre site is located on a bluff above the Little Miami River about 5 miles upstream from the Ohio River. While occupied over hundreds of years, it was settled most intensively in the late sixteenth and early seventeenth centuries, and is the most excavated Fort Ancient site of this time period. Early twentieth-century excavations were carried out by staff of the Peabody Museum at Harvard University in Cambridge, Massachusetts.

Since 1990, the Cincinnati Museum of Natural History has done additional studies, with findings increased by the use of current technology and professional practices. The village site was found to have had two or more small plazas, rather than just one central site, as seen at the earlier SunWatch Indian Village.

This is believed to be the only Fort Ancient site whose people consumed bison as part of the game hunted to supplement their diet of maize. They may have hunted the animals in areas to the west of this site. Elk and deer were also valuable for their meat. The people also processed their bones, tendons and hides to make tools, musical instruments, clothing, and ornaments.

Researchers found a large amount of goods of non-local materials and design, indicating the villagers were connected to a large exchange network. Items were identified as from the St. Lawrence River region, on the New York and Canadian border, eastern present-day Iowa, and northern Alabama, as well as Tennessee. The size and limited range of European goods indicated they came from an indirect network at this time, rather than in direct trading. People at Madisonville made distinctive snake-shaped ornaments, which have been found at other sites as distant as Iroquois settlements in Ontario, Canada and western present-day New York.

== See also ==
- Mariemont Historic District
