= Mariemont, Ohio =

- Village
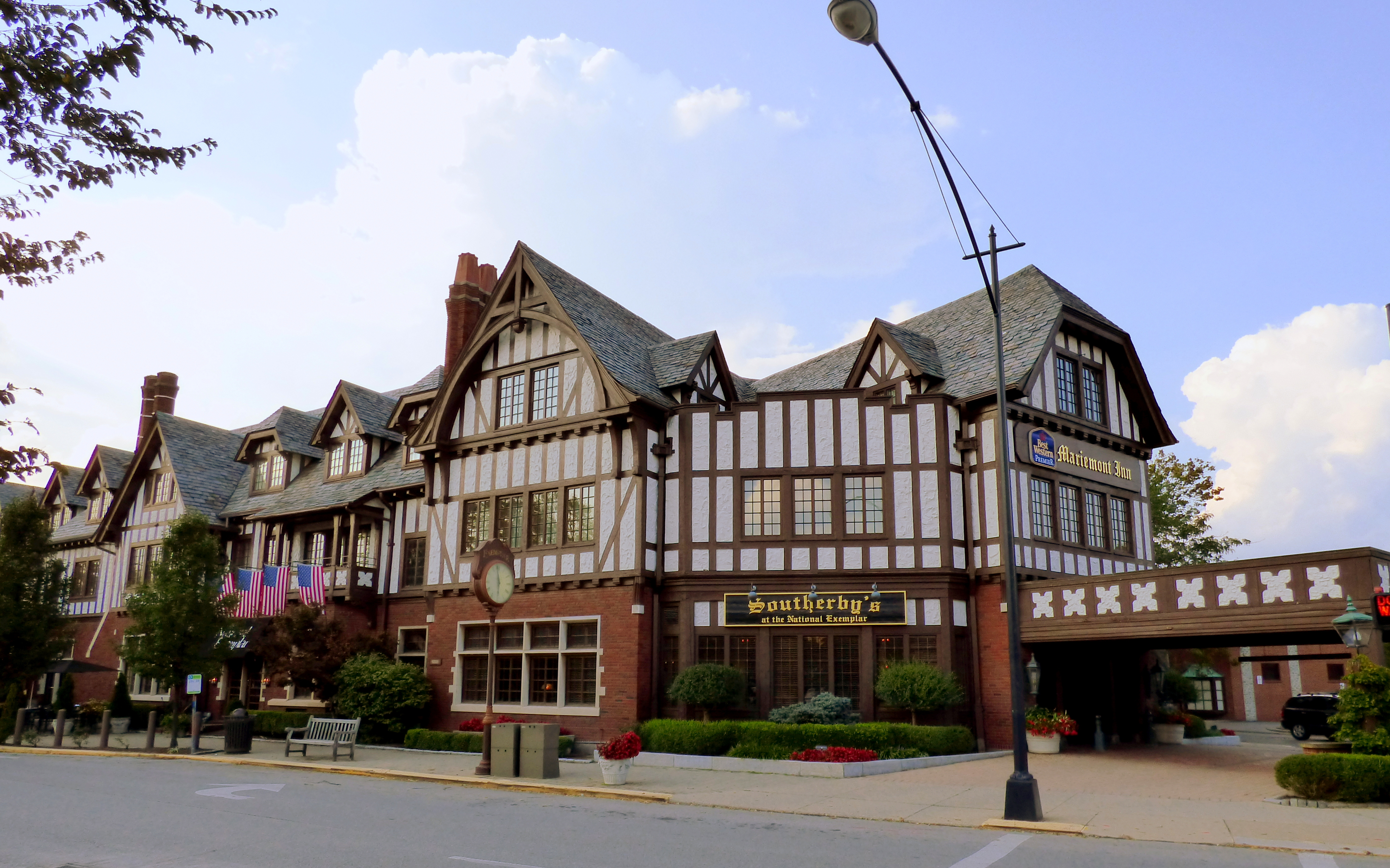
- Mariemont Inn

- Flag Seal
- Motto(s): Juvnibus Dicatum (Latin) "Dedicated to Young People"
- Location in Hamilton County and the state of Ohio
- Coordinates: 39°08′39″N 84°22′34″W
- Country: United States
- State: Ohio
- County: Hamilton

Government
  - Mayor: Bill Brown (R)

Area
  - Total: 0.92 sq mi (2.37 km^{2})
  - Land: 0.90 sq mi (2.32 km^{2})
  - Water: 0.023 sq mi (0.06 km^{2})
- Elevation: 584 ft (178 m)

Population (2020)
  - Total: 3,518
  - Density: 3,935.8/sq mi (1,519.62/km^{2})
- Time zone: UTC-5 (Eastern (EST))
  - Summer (DST): UTC-4 (EDT)
- ZIP code: 45227
- Area code: 513
- FIPS code: 39-47600
- GNIS feature ID: 1086219
- Website: www.mariemont.org

Mariemont (/ˈmɛərimɒnt/ MAIR-ee-mont) is a village in eastern Hamilton County, Ohio, United States. The population was 3,518 at the 2020 census. A planned community in the Cincinnati metropolitan area, it includes two overlapping historic districts, the Village of Mariemont and Mariemont Historic District. In 2007, the Village of Mariemont was designated a National Historic Landmark.

== History ==
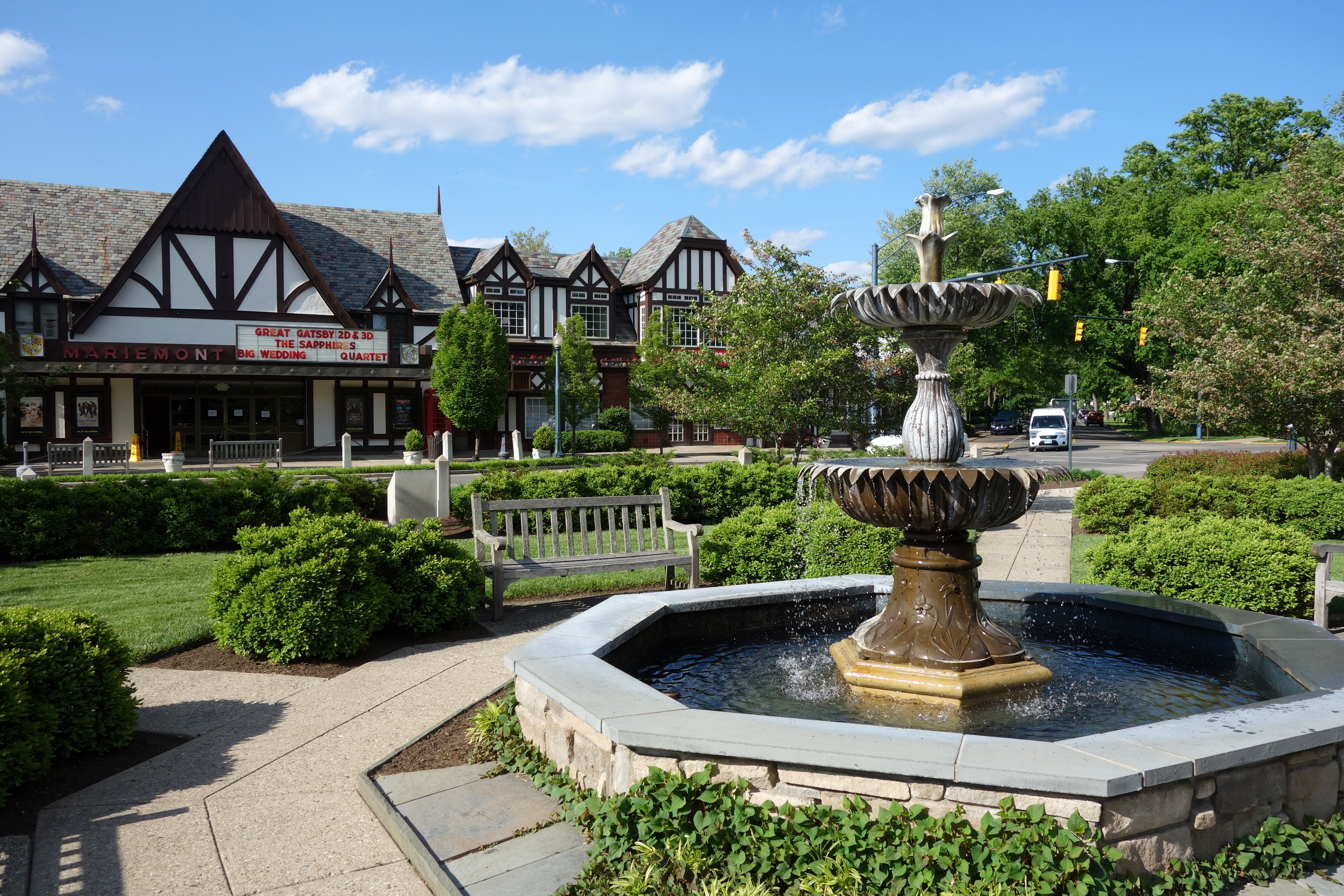
Mariemont Town Center

Madisonville site, the remains of a Fort Ancient village abandoned before Europeans settled in the area in 1786, is located nearby. There is also a pioneer cemetery adjacent to the Mariemont Community Church.

Mariemont was founded by Mary Emery and planned by John Nolen and 25 leading American architects. Emery and other dignitaries broke ground on April 23, 1923. Emery had spent around seven million dollars of her own money to purchase the land that would become Mariemont. Her vision was of a planned community reminiscent of an English garden city that would welcome people of differing economic backgrounds, with a mix of single-family homes and affordable low-rise apartments.

However, the dream of welcoming all classes was not achieved in the end. Construction costs drove rents up considerably higher than those in the city that Emery had hoped to help others escape. Like other planned communities founded before 1960, Mariemont was originally an exclusively white community. Homeownership in Mariemont came with deed restrictions, including restrictions on occupants. “No lot shall be sold, conveyed, rented, leased or mortgaged to or occupied, except as a house servant, by a person of African or Asiatic descent.” While such restrictions were commonplace for the period, it is notable that the Mariemont Company adopted them, as they sit at odds with Thomas J. Emery’s documented record of philanthropy and advocacy, and with Mary Emery’s as well. Both supported African American causes, whether through funding segregated institutions such as orphanages or by pressing for the equal admission of Black and white students at the Ohio Mechanics Institute, making the company’s policies a striking contrast to their broader commitments.

In 2008, owing to its "unique character, compact and walkable design, and strong citizen participation and engagement", the American Planning Association designated Mariemont a "Great Neighbourhood".

== Geography ==
According to the United States Census Bureau, the village has a total area of 0.89 square miles (2.31 km^{2}), of which 0.86 square miles (2.23 km^{2}) is land and 0.03 square miles (0.08 km^{2}) is water.

== Demographics ==
Historical population
Census	Pop.	Note	%±
1950	3,514		—
1960	4,120		17.2%
1970	4,204		2.0%
1980	3,295		−21.6%
1990	3,118		−5.4%
2000	3,408		9.3%
2010	3,403		−0.1%
2020	3,518		3.4%
U.S. Decennial Census

=== 2020 census ===
As of the 2020 census, there were 3,518 people living in the village, for a population density of 3,935.12 people per square mile (1,519.62/km^{2}). There were 1,547 housing units.

The median age was 39.0 years. 26.4% of residents were under the age of 18 and 17.0% were 65 years of age or older. For every 100 females, there were 83.1 males, and for every 100 females age 18 and over, there were 79.7 males.

100.0% of residents lived in urban areas, while 0.0% lived in rural areas.

There were 1,433 households, of which 35.4% had children under the age of 18 living in them. Of all households, 53.8% were married-couple households, 12.0% were households with a male householder and no spouse or partner present, and 29.7% were households with a female householder and no spouse or partner present. About 29.9% of all households were made up of individuals, and 13.4% had someone living alone who was 65 years of age or older.

There were 1,547 housing units, of which 7.4% were vacant. The homeowner vacancy rate was 0.5% and the rental vacancy rate was 7.4%.

Racial composition as of the 2020 census
Race	Number	Percent
White	3,247	92.3%
Black or African American	27	0.8%
American Indian and Alaska Native	1	0.0%
Asian	61	1.7%
Native Hawaiian and Other Pacific Islander	0	0.0%
Some other race	15	0.4%
Two or more races	167	4.7%
Hispanic or Latino (of any race)	83	2.4%

=== Income and poverty ===
According to the U.S. Census American Community Survey, for the period 2016-2020 the estimated median annual income for a household in the village was $120,281, and the median income for a family was $151,935. About 3.5% of the population were living below the poverty line, including 4.3% of those under age 18 and 3.1% of those age 65 or over. About 66.8% of the population were employed, and 81.3% had a bachelor's degree or higher.

=== 2010 census ===
According to the 2010 census, there were 3,403 people, 1,443 households, and 877 families living in the village. The population density was 3,957.0 inhabitants per square mile (1,527.8/km^{2}). There were 1,597 housing units at an average density of 1,857.0 per square mile (717.0/km^{2}). The racial makeup of the village was 94.7% White, 1.6% African American, 0.2% Native American, 1.3% Asian, 0.1% Pacific Islander, 0.5% from other races, and 1.7% from two or more races. Hispanic or Latino of any race were 1.6% of the population.

There were 1,443 households, of which 35.4% had children under the age of 18 living with them, 49.3% were married couples living together, 8.8% had a female householder with no husband present, 2.6% had a male householder with no wife present, and 39.2% were non-families. 33.7% of all households were made up of individuals, and 14% had someone living alone who was 65 years of age or older. The average household size was 2.34 and the average family size was 3.08.

The median age in the village was 36.6 years. 28.2% of residents were under the age of 18; 5.2% were between the ages of 18 and 24; 29.1% were from 25 to 44; 24.6% were from 45 to 64; and 12.9% were 65 years of age or older. The gender makeup of the village was 45.2% male and 54.8% female.

=== 2000 census ===
As of the census of 2000, there were 3,408 people, 1,463 households, and 886 families living in the village. The population density was 3,991.7 inhabitants per square mile (1,541.2/km^{2}). There were 1,541 housing units at an average density of 1,804.9 per square mile (696.9/km^{2}). The racial makeup of the village was 96.92% White, 1.00% African American, 0.23% Native American, 0.79% Asian, 0.12% Pacific Islander, 0.21% from other races, and 0.73% from two or more races. Hispanic or Latino of any race were 1.03% of the population.

There were 1,463 households, out of which 33.3% had children under the age of 18 living with them, 49.3% were married couples living together, 9.9% had a female householder with no husband present, and 39.4% were non-families. 35.1% of all households were made up of individuals, and 14.8% had someone living alone who was 65 years of age or older. The average household size was 2.26 and the average family size was 2.97.

In the village, the population was spread out, with 26.8% under the age of 18, 4.0% from 18 to 24, 31.2% from 25 to 44, 20.0% from 45 to 64, and 17.9% who were 65 years of age or older. The median age was 38 years. For every 100 females, there were 77.8 males. For every 100 females age 18 and over, there were 70.8 males.

The median income for a household in the village was $57,614, and the median income for a family was $81,358. Males had a median income of $59,400 versus $38,938 for females. The per capita income for the village was $32,897. About 3.6% of families and 5.0% of the population were below the poverty line, including 7.3% of those under age 18 and 2.3% of those age 65 or over.

== Education ==
Mariemont is served by the Mariemont City School District, which includes Mariemont High School.

== See also ==
- Eliphalet Ferris House
