= SunWatch Indian Village =

Open-air museum in Ohio, US

- SunWatch Site
- U.S. National Register of Historic Places
- U.S. National Historic Landmark
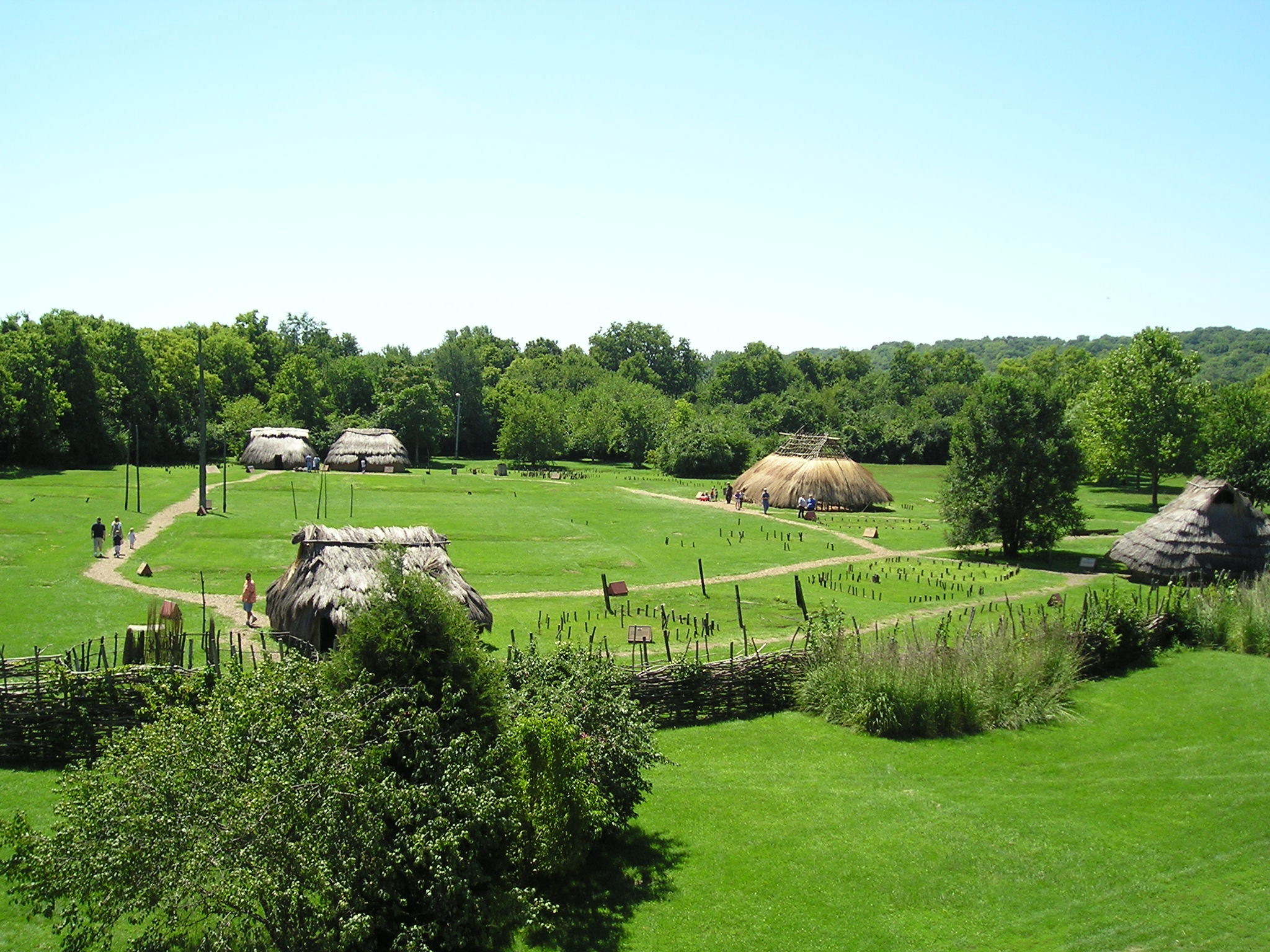
- SunWatch Village

- Location within Ohio Location within the United States
- Location: 2301 W. River Rd., Dayton, Ohio
- Coordinates: 39.71634°N 84.231577°W
- Area: 3 acres (1.2 ha)
- NRHP reference No.: 75001500

Significant dates
- Added to NRHP: April 1, 1975
- Designated NHL: June 21, 1990

SunWatch Indian Village / Archaeological Park, previously known as the Incinerator Site, and designated by the Smithsonian trinomial 33-MY-57, is a reconstructed Fort Ancient Native American village next to the Great Miami River. The dwellings and site plan of the 3-acre (1.2 ha) site are based on lengthy archeological excavations sponsored by the Dayton Society of Natural History, which owns and operates the site as an open-air museum. Because of its archaeological value, the site was listed in 1974 on the National Register of Historic Places. Since that time, as the many years of archaeological research at the site have led to important findings about the Fort Ancient culture, SunWatch Indian Village was designated in 1990 as a National Historic Landmark.

== History ==
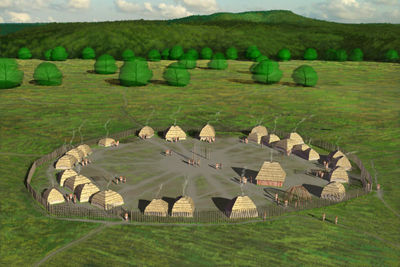
Artist's conception of the SunWatch Indian Village

Amateurs had found some prehistoric materials at the site in the 1960s. Professional excavation began in 1971 as a salvage operation when the city planned a sewage treatment plant. With the discovery of significant artifacts and the remains of a stockaded village, the city changed its plans to preserve the site. Excavations continued through 1988 and are generally completed, although additional small studies have been done. The studies have revealed much about the original people's dwellings, social organization, diets, burial practices and other aspects of their lives at the site. The circular village, surrounded by defensive palisades, was occupied for about 20 years, with a total population of about 250. They depended on farming and hunting.

Scholars have named it Sun Watch because, since studies of the 1980s, they believe that a complex of posts in the plaza is related to astronomical measurements. The Fort Ancient culture people, whose society was based on agriculture, would have planned rituals around a solar calendar.

With reconstructed dwellings, a plaza and gardens, and an interpretive center, the village was opened in 1988 to the public as an open-air museum. Interpretive tours are offered as well as a variety of educational programs and special events developed in collaboration with Native American and other groups. Archaeological excavations are ongoing in the area, with special opportunities for school groups, graduate students, and adult learners.

Additional artifacts and exhibits are held in the related Boonshoft Museum of Discovery in Dayton. These help interpret the history and culture of the people, and show more of the artifacts recovered at the site than can be displayed at SunWatch.

== See also ==
- Boonshoft Museum of Discovery
- List of National Historic Landmarks in Ohio
