= William Edwards Farmhouse =

Historic house in Ohio, United States

- U.S. National Register of Historic Places
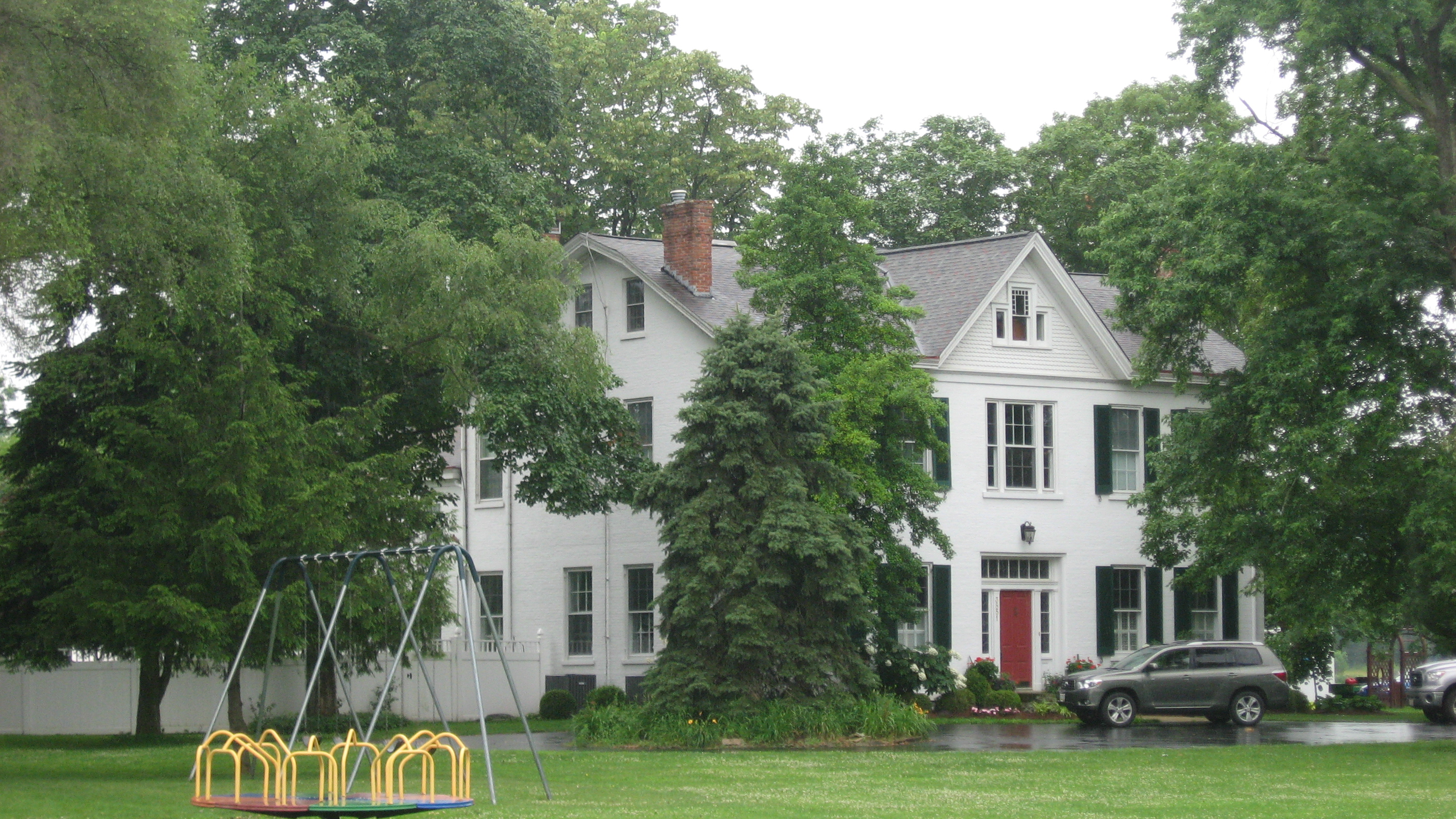
- Front and side of the house

- Location within Ohio Location within the United States
- Location: 3851 Edwards Rd., Newtown, Ohio
- Coordinates: 39°7′41″N 84°20′30″W
- Area: 6.6 acres (2.7 ha)
- Built: 1840
- Architectural style: Greek Revival
- NRHP reference No.: 89001455
- Added to NRHP: October 4, 1989

The William Edwards Farmhouse is a historic residence near Cincinnati in the village of Newtown, Ohio, United States. One of the area's leading early farmhouses, it has been designated a historic site.

In the early 19th century, New Jersey native Isaac Edwards purchased land in the Virginia Military District from other early residents; part of his new property comprised a farm in District Land Grant 427 with an extant log cabin. Here, adjacent to Isaac's own property, settled his son, William. Before long, the log cabin proved insufficient for his family's needs, so in 1840 Edwards arranged for the construction of a new brick structure. This building, the present house, was constructed with many elements of the stylish Greek Revival mode of architecture, but it also combined some non-Greek elements, such as the gambrel roof. Two and a half stories tall, the house was built of brick on a foundation of limestone.

For most of its history, the house has been a local landmark. Just forty years after it was built, the 1881 History of Hamilton County highlighted it and described it as a mansion. Nearly a century later, architectural historians praised it as being one of the best local examples of early agricultural architecture in Anderson Township. In recognition of the historic importance of its architecture, the house was listed on the National Register of Historic Places in late 1989, along with a single outbuilding. It is one of six National Register-listed places in the vicinity of Newtown, along with the Cyrus Broadwell House, the Hahn Field Archeological District, the Harrison-Landers House, the Odd Fellows' Cemetery Mound, and the Perin Village Site.
