= Sherwood, Ohio =

Sherwood is the name of some places in the U.S. state of Ohio:

- Sherwood, Defiance County, Ohio
- Sherwood, Hamilton County, Ohio
- Sherwood, Ohio, fictional setting for the movie and musical Heathers

== See also ==
- Sherwood Anderson Park in Clyde, Ohio
