= Anderson Township, Ohio =

Township in Ohio, US

Anderson Township, Hamilton County, Ohio
- Township
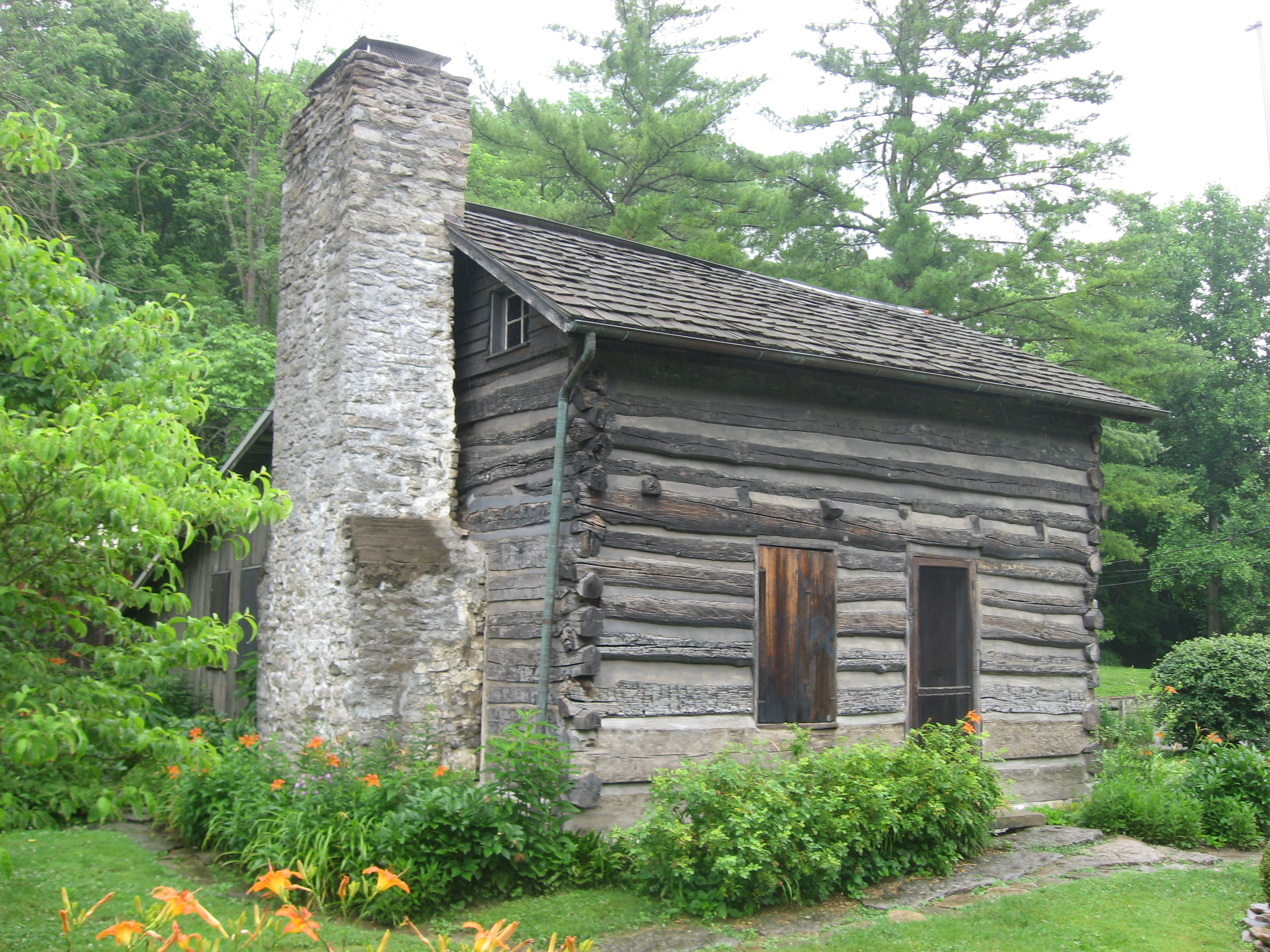
- Miller-Leuser Log House, built 1796

- Seal

- Location in Hamilton County and the state of Ohio.
- Coordinates: 39°5′19″N 84°21′36″W
- Country: United States
- State: Ohio
- County: Hamilton
- Settled: 1788
- Organized: 1793
- Named after: Richard Clough Anderson Sr.

Government
  - Type: Board of Trustees
  - Trustee: Katie Nappi
  - Trustee: Tom Hodges
  - Trustee: Dee Stone
  - Fiscal Officer: Brian M. Johnson

Area
  - Total: 31.2 sq mi (80.8 km^{2})
  - Land: 30.3 sq mi (78.6 km^{2})
  - Water: 0.81 sq mi (2.1 km^{2})
- Elevation: 725 ft (221 m)

Population (2020)
  - Total: 44,088
  - Density: 1,453/sq mi (560.9/km^{2})
- Time zone: UTC-05:00 (EST)
  - Summer (DST): UTC-04:00 (EDT)
- ZIP code: 45230, 45244, and 45255
- Area code: 513
- FIPS code: 39-01980
- GNIS feature ID: 1086197
- Website: www.andersontownship.org

Anderson Township is a township located southeastern Hamilton County along the Ohio and Little Miami Rivers, approximately 13 miles southeast of downtown Cincinnati. The population was 44,088 at the 2020 census.

== History ==
Anderson Township's earliest settlement came in 1788, when pioneer Benjamin Stites settled near the mouth of the Little Miami River. The treaty of Easton forbade entering Ohio. but because England had been run out in the Revolutionary War, the local natives did not know treaty was void. The township was organized in 1793 as part of the Virginia Military District and was bounded by the Ohio and Little Miami Rivers, and the mouth of the Eight Mile Creek to the east. The township was important during its early days as the site of Flinn's Ford, the southernmost crossing of the Little Miami River. Anderson Township remained mainly undeveloped forest and agricultural land until post-World War II suburbanization brought new infrastructure to the community. The population grew by an average of 1,000 persons per year from the 1950s through the early 1990s bringing massive residential and commercial developments to the area. Anderson Township is named for Richard Clough Anderson Sr., Virginia's chief surveyor when the township was created.

Anderson Township became a qualified Tree City USA as recognized by the National Arbor Day Foundation in 2009.

== Geography ==
Located in the southeastern corner of the county, the township is bounded by the Ohio River to the south and the Little Miami River to the north and west. The eastern border does not follow any land or water feature but is instead defined by a straight line extending due south from the confluence of the Little Miami River's East Fork and main channels. Land to the east of this border belongs to Clermont County. Municipal divisions that share a border with Anderson Township include all of the following:

- Linwood, Mt. Washington, East End, and California (all constituent neighborhoods of Cincinnati) to the west.
- Mariemont to the northwest.
- Plainville (officially part of Columbia Township) to the north.
- Terrace Park to the northeast
- Summerside, Mt. Carmel, and Tobasco (all, officially, of Union Township, Clermont County) to the east.
- Locust Grove (officially, Pierce Township, Clermont County) to the southeast.
- Campbell County, Kentucky to the south and southwest.

Other municipalities and subdivisions of note that neighbor the township not directly, but by proximity of one-eighth of a mile or less, include Mt. Lookout, Hyde Park, Fairfax, and Milford.

Also of note is the fact that Anderson's nearest neighbors to the east, Mt. Washington and California, are functionally exclaves of the City of Cincinnati, as they are impossible to reach via land or water without crossing into territory administered by Anderson Township (which controls the Little Miami River as it exists within Hamilton County).

Where California occupies the side of the Little Miami opposite the city at its delta, Mt. Washington (just barely) achieves its connection to California via a narrow terrestrial tract of land that spans approximately 1,000 feet (300 meters). It features no public or private road and is made up of at least ten private land parcels, all accessed via Anderson. Exactly whose historical interests were served by this arrangement is the subject of irregular dispute, but the lack of precedent for these irregular borders has attracted local criticism in the near and distant past alike.

Anderson Township includes the following census-designated places:

- Cherry Grove
- Coldstream
- Dry Run
- Forestville
- Fruit Hill
- Salem Heights
- Sherwood
- Turpin Hills

The township is composed of 31.2 square miles (80.8 km^{2}) of rolling hills with steep, wooded hillsides leading down to the Little Miami and Ohio rivers. As of 1990, 36% of Anderson Township had been developed into suburban communities for Cincinnati, 13% into farmland, and the remainder being left as woodland.

== Demographics ==
Historical population
Census	Pop.	Note	%±
1820	2,122		—
1850	3,048		—
1860	3,439		12.8%
1870	4,077		18.6%
1880	4,154		1.9%
1890	4,035		−2.9%
1900	4,534		12.4%
1910	4,050		−10.7%
1920	2,984		−26.3%
1930	4,834		62.0%
1940	6,692		38.4%
1950	10,339		54.5%
1960	17,250		66.8%
1970	27,934		61.9%
1980	34,504		23.5%
1990	39,939		15.8%
2000	43,857		9.8%
2010	43,446		−0.9%
2020	44,088		1.5%

=== 2020 census ===
As of the census of 2020, there were 44,088 people living in the township, for a population density of 1,455.04 people per square mile (560.91/km^{2}). There were 16,962 housing units. The racial makeup of the township was 90.0% White, 1.6% Black or African American, 0.1% Native American, 2.2% Asian, 0.0% Pacific Islander, 0.8% from some other race, and 5.3% from two or more races. 2.6% of the population were Hispanic or Latino of any race.

There were 16,301 households, out of which 38.7% had children under the age of 18 living with them, 61.4% were married couples living together, 14.4% had a male householder with no spouse present, and 20.6% had a female householder with no spouse present. 20.8% of all households were made up of individuals, and 10.8% were someone living alone who was 65 years of age or older. The average household size was 2.67, and the average family size was 3.10.

27.3% of the township's population were under the age of 18, 56.0% were 18 to 64, and 16.7% were 65 years of age or older. The median age was 41.1. For every 100 females, there were 98.0 males.

According to the U.S. Census American Community Survey, for the period 2016-2020 the estimated median annual income for a household in the township was $103,774, and the median income for a family was $127,465. About 3.9% of the population were living below the poverty line, including 4.9% of those under age 18 and 2.8% of those age 65 or over. About 66.4% of the population were employed, and 57.5% had a bachelor's degree or higher.

== Government ==
The township is governed by a three-member board of trustees, who are elected in November of odd-numbered years to a four-year term beginning on the following January 1. Two are elected in the year after the presidential election and one is elected in the year before it. There is also an elected township fiscal officer, who serves a four-year term beginning on April 1 of the year after the election, which is held in November of the year before the presidential election. Vacancies in the fiscal officership or on the board of trustees are filled by the remaining trustees. Anderson Township is also a member of the Ohio-Kentucky-Indiana Regional Council of Governments.

=== Police and fire services ===
Police services are provided by the Hamilton County Sheriff's Office. Fire and Emergency Medical Services are provided by the Anderson Township Fire Department.

== Transportation ==
=== Major roads ===
Anderson Township is served by Interstate 275, US Route 52, State Route 32 and State Route 125 (Beechmont Avenue). Interstate 275 crosses the Ohio River into Kentucky near the southern border of the township on the Combs-Hehl Bridge. Anderson Township is also in close proximity to US Route 27, US Route 50 and Interstate 471.

=== Transit ===
Anderson Township is served by the Southwest Ohio Regional Transit Authority, which provides local and commuter bus service on various routes to and from the township. Uber and Lyft operate in the township.

=== Airports ===
Cincinnati Municipal Lunken Airport (IATA: LUK) provides private and limited amounts of commercial air service and is located immediately southwest of the township near the confluence of the Ohio and Little Miami Rivers. The Cincinnati/Northern Kentucky International Airport (IATA: CVG) provides most commercial air service to the area and is located approximately 20 miles southwest in nearby Hebron, Kentucky.

=== Rail ===
Rail service (freight) is provided by Norfolk Southern Railway in the northernmost portions of the township on a rail line between Cincinnati and Portsmouth.

== Education ==
=== Schools ===
Nearly all of Anderson Township is located in the Forest Hills Local School District. The district boasts an "Excellent with Distinction" rating from Ohio Department of Education.

Forest Hills Local School District serves an approximate student population of 7,655 in pre-kindergarten through twelfth grade. The district employs 422 full-time classroom teachers and the district's overall student/teacher ratio is 18.1:1, with an instructional expense of $4,048 per student.

Schools within the district include:

- Anderson High School
- Ayer Elementary School
- Maddux Elementary School
- Mercer Elementary School
- Nagel Middle School
- Sherwood Elementary School
- Summit Elementary School
- Turpin High School
- Wilson Elementary School

In 2005, the Forest Hills School District was presented a banner from the Ohio Department of Education recognizing the achievement of receiving an "Excellent" rating on the State Report Card for five consecutive years. Only 47 of the state's 614 school districts have achieved an Excellent rating for five consecutive years putting the district in the top 8 percent of districts in the state. This was achieved with more than 7,000 students and by spending less per pupil than many of the other school districts that are rated excellent.

=== Library ===
Anderson Township is served by a branch of the Public Library of Cincinnati and Hamilton County., and consistently has one of the highest rates of circulation of the Library's branches.

== Notable people ==
- Marty Brennaman, sportscaster
- Thom Brennaman, sportscaster; graduate of Anderson High School
- Marc Burch, professional soccer player for Seattle Sounders FC; 2002 graduate of Turpin High School
- Dennis Courtney, aka Denis Beaulne, Broadway Actor and Director; graduate of Anderson High School
- Richard Dotson, former MLB pitcher (Chicago White Sox, New York Yankees, Kansas City Royals); graduate of Anderson High School
- Ira Joe Fisher, broadcaster, poet, and educator
- Julie Isphording, long-distance runner, competed in 1984 Olympics in Los Angeles; graduate of Anderson High School
- Jensen Lewis, former MLB pitcher for Cleveland Indians; graduate of Anderson High School
- Vicki Lewis, actress of film, stage, and television; graduate of Anderson High School
- Jim Leyritz, former professional baseball player, mostly with the New York Yankees; graduate of Turpin High School
- Andrew Norwell, NFL guard for Jacksonville Jaguars; graduate of Anderson High School
- Allen M. Potter, American television soap opera producer
- Dave Wilson, gold and silver medalist in swimming, 1984 Olympics in Los Angeles; graduate of Anderson High School
- Michelle Yi, contestant on CBS' Survivor: Fiji; 2002 graduate of Turpin High School
- Marilyn Zayas, judge on Ohio's First District Court of Appeals

== Recreation ==
Anderson Township is home to Riverbend Music Center and Belterra Park Gaming & Entertainment Center. It has become known for its numerous parks, greenspaces and outdoor activities. The Anderson Parks district is an organization supporting 9 parks and an indoor RecPlex, totaling over 500 acres of land. The Anderson Foundation for Parks & Recreation was established in 1991 to help support these parks and expand their offerings and mission.
