= Salem Heights, Hamilton County, Ohio =

Salem Heights, Ohio
- Census-designated place
- Location in Hamilton County and the state of Ohio
- Coordinates: 39°03′43″N 84°22′48″W
- Country: United States
- State: Ohio
- County: Hamilton

Area
  - Total: 1.63 sq mi (4.21 km^{2})
  - Land: 1.63 sq mi (4.21 km^{2})
  - Water: 0 sq mi (0.00 km^{2})
- Elevation: 784 ft (239 m)

Population (2020)
  - Total: 3,862
  - Density: 2,374.9/sq mi (916.95/km^{2})
- Time zone: UTC-5 (Eastern (EST))
  - Summer (DST): UTC-4 (EDT)
- FIPS code: 39-70050
- GNIS feature ID: 2585525

Salem Heights is a census-designated place (CDP) in Anderson Township, Hamilton County, Ohio, United States, adjacent to the city of Cincinnati. The population of Salem Heights was 3,862 at the 2020 census.

== Geography ==
Salem Heights is located 10 miles (16 km) east of downtown Cincinnati. The Cincinnati neighborhood of Mount Washington is directly to the north. The census-designated place of Fruit Hill lies to the east, and to the south are Interstate 275 and the Ohio River.

According to the United States Census Bureau, the Salem Heights CDP has a total area of 1.7 square miles (4.3 km^{2}), all land.

== Demographics ==
Historical population
Census	Pop.	Note	%±
2010	3,839		—
2020	3,862		0.6%
U.S. Decennial Census

As of the census of 2020, there were 3,862 people living in the CDP, for a population density of 2,375.15 people per square mile (916.95/km^{2}). There were 1,478 housing units. The racial makeup of the CDP was 90.8% White, 1.6% Black or African American, 0.1% Native American, 0.9% Asian, 0.0% Pacific Islander, 0.7% from some other race, and 6.0% from two or more races. 2.7% of the population were Hispanic or Latino of any race.

There were 1,345 households, out of which 34.5% had children under the age of 18 living with them, 46.8% were married couples living together, 14.9% had a male householder with no spouse present, and 29.7% had a female householder with no spouse present. 17.5% of all households were made up of individuals, and 10.4% were someone living alone who was 65 years of age or older. The average household size was 2.53, and the average family size was 2.80.

20.6% of the CDP's population were under the age of 18, 62.4% were 18 to 64, and 17.0% were 65 years of age or older. The median age was 38.9. For every 100 females, there were 98.6 males.

According to the U.S. Census American Community Survey, for the period 2016-2020 the estimated median annual income for a household in the CDP was $81,331, and the median income for a family was $93,125. About 6.1% of the population were living below the poverty line, including 9.4% of those under age 18 and 2.7% of those age 65 or over. About 64.6% of the population were employed, and 46.3% had a bachelor's degree or higher.
