= International Aircraft =

International Aircraft Corporation
- Formerly: Catron and Fisk Company
- Industry: Aerospace
- Founded: 1909 in California
- Founders: J.W. Catron; Edwin M. Fisk
- Headquarters: Ancor, Ohio, United States
- Key people: Arthur Ewald (President); Harold A. Speers (Vice President); J. Dixon Davis (Test Pilot); Raymond D. Harris (Chief Pilot); C. A. Harrison (Assistant Sales Manager)
- Number of employees: 160 (1928)

International Aircraft Corporation was an American 1920s aircraft manufacturer located in Ancor near Newtown, Ohio.

== History ==
=== Foundation in California ===
The Catron and Fisk Company was founded in California in 1909 by Edwin M. Fisk and J.W. Catron. In February 1927, the company was reorganized as the International Aircraft Corporation. However, the corporation was forced to move after its factory in Long Beach was unable to keep up with demand. At the time of its move, the company had 80 airplanes on order, but could only build six a week. The vacated factory building would later be leased by the Courier Aircraft Company.

=== Move to Ohio ===
In 1927, the company was purchased by a group of Cincinnatians, and moved to a former federal government nitrate plant near Newtown, Ohio. Production commenced even before the factory was formally dedicated on 12 May 1928, with the first airplane rolling out on April 7. Later in May, construction was started on a new steel hangar at the site. In August, the company delivered newly completed aircraft by train for the first time. The company entered two airplanes in the 1928 National Air Tour. By October, it had contracted with the newly created Dawson Aircraft Corporation in Pittsburgh, Pennsylvania for the latter to act as a distributor. However, the company rejected a follow-up offer by the Pittsburgh Chamber of Commerce to move the factory there. By that point aircraft production had ended. A plan proposed in December called for the company to be reorganized as a Delaware corporation owned by a group of investors led by C. B. Morganthaler.

=== Move to Michigan ===
The company was purchased by interests in Jackson, Michigan in May 1929. Land was purchased at Reynolds Field and plans were announced for a new 22-passenger trimotor airliner in addition to the company's existing aircraft. However, operations in Cincinnati were resumed in June and planned to continue until the new plant in Michigan was completed.

Following the sale, president Clarence E. Ogden carried out a series of lawsuits concerning the naming of a company receiver and disposition of various company airplanes.

To promote their new company, a women's air endurance record attempt was suggested. To this end, participation from famous aviatrixes Louise Thaden and Blanche Noyes was solicited.

== Aircraft ==
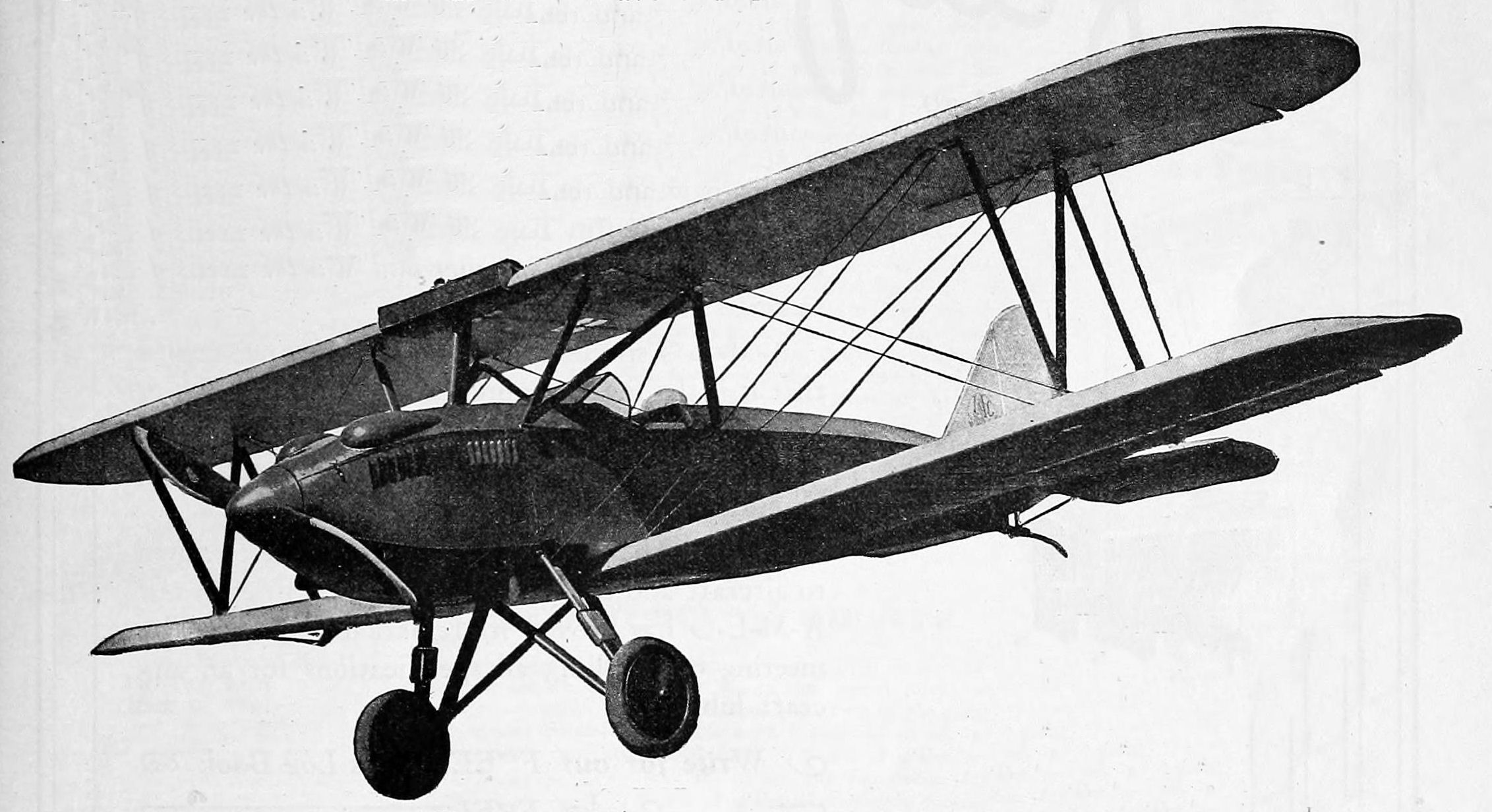
International F-17 Sportsman

Model name	First flight	Number built	Type
Catron-Fisk CF-10		~5 or 6	Twin engine transport triplane
Catron-Fisk CF-11		2	Single engine utility biplane
Catron-Fisk CF-12			
Catron-Fisk CF-13		1	Single engine utility biplane
Catron-Fisk CF-14		1	Trimotor transport triplane
Catron-Fisk CF-15			Single engine utility biplane
International F-16 Violet		1	Single engine utility biplane
International F-17 Sportsman		20+	Single engine utility biplane
International F-18 Air-Coach		6	Single engine transport biplane
International F-25			Three engine transport

== See also ==
- Aeronca Aircraft
- Metal Aircraft Corporation
