= Sherwood Elementary School =

- Sherwood Elementary School (Prince Edward Island) - Charlottetown, Prince Edward Island
- Sherwood Elementary School (Arkansas) - Sherwood, Arkansas
- Sherwood Elementary School (Ohio) - Hamilton County, Ohio
- Sherwood Elementary School (North Carolina) - Gaston, North Carolina
- Sherwood Elementary School (California) - Salinas, California
