= Sherwood Park (disambiguation) =

Sherwood Park is a large hamlet in Alberta, Canada.

Sherwood Park may also refer to:

== Australia ==
- Sherwood Park railway station, Victoria

== Canada ==
- Sherwood Park (electoral district)
- Sherwood Park (Toronto), a park in Toronto
- Sherwood Park Crusaders, an ice hockey team
- Sherwood Park Titans, a lacrosse team
- Edmonton—Sherwood Park, an electoral district

== England ==
- Sherwood Park, part of Royal Tunbridge Wells, in Kent

== United States ==
- Sherwood Park (Richmond, Virginia), a neighborhood in Richmond, Virginia
- Sherwood Anderson Park, in Clyde, Ohio
- A park in Salinas, California
