= Dry Run, Ohio =

- Census-designated place
- Location in Hamilton County and the state of Ohio.
- Coordinates: 39°06′18″N 84°19′52″W
- Country: United States
- State: Ohio
- County: Hamilton

Area
  - Total: 4.76 sq mi (12.34 km^{2})
  - Land: 4.76 sq mi (12.32 km^{2})
  - Water: 0.0077 sq mi (0.02 km^{2})
- Elevation: 863 ft (263 m)

Population (2020)
  - Total: 7,672
  - Density: 1,612.8/sq mi (622.72/km^{2})
- Time zone: UTC-5 (Eastern (EST))
  - Summer (DST): UTC-4 (EDT)
- ZIP code: 45244
- Area codes: 283 and 513
- FIPS code: 39-22674
- GNIS feature ID: 2393400

Dry Run is a census-designated place (CDP) in Anderson Township, Hamilton County, Ohio, United States. The population was 7,672 at the 2020 census.

== Geography ==
According to the United States Census Bureau, the CDP has a total area of 4.8 square miles (12 km^{2}), all land.

== Demographics ==
Historical population
Census	Pop.	Note	%±
2020	7,672		—
U.S. Decennial Census

=== 2020 census ===
As of the census of 2020, there were 7,672 people living in the CDP, for a population density of 1,612.78 people per square mile (622.72/km^{2}). There were 2,519 housing units. The racial makeup of the CDP was 90.4% White, 0.8% Black or African American, 0.1% Native American, 2.7% Asian, 0.0% Pacific Islander, 0.4% from some other race, and 5.5% from two or more races. 2.2% of the population were Hispanic or Latino of any race.

There were 2,390 households, out of which 50.5% had children under the age of 18 living with them, 79.6% were married couples living together, 7.8% had a male householder with no spouse present, and 8.0% had a female householder with no spouse present. 8.4% of all households were made up of individuals, and 2.5% were someone living alone who was 65 years of age or older. The average household size was 3.12, and the average family size was 3.24.

31.5% of the CDP's population were under the age of 18, 54.5% were 18 to 64, and 14.0% were 65 years of age or older. The median age was 38.8. For every 100 females, there were 106.2 males.

According to the U.S. Census American Community Survey, for the period 2016-2020 the estimated median annual income for a household in the CDP was $154,722, and the median income for a family was $156,250. About 3.4% of the population were living below the poverty line, including 6.0% of those under age 18 and 1.2% of those age 65 or over. About 66.4% of the population were employed, and 67.4% had a bachelor's degree or higher.

=== 2000 census ===
At the 2000 census there were 6,553 people, 2,063 households, and 1,852 families living in the CDP. The population density was 1,378.3 inhabitants per square mile (532.2/km^{2}). There were 2,118 housing units at an average density of 445.5 per square mile (172.0/km^{2}). The racial makeup of the CDP was 96.47% White, 0.66% African American, 0.05% Native American, 1.88% Asian, 0.26% from other races, and 0.69% from two or more races. Hispanic or Latino of any race were 0.96%.

Of the 2,063 households 52.3% had children under the age of 18 living with them, 84.4% were married couples living together, 3.6% had a female householder with no husband present, and 10.2% were non-families. 8.5% of households were one person and 3.5% were one person aged 65 or older. The average household size was 3.18 and the average family size was 3.38.

The age distribution was 34.2% under the age of 18, 4.7% from 18 to 24, 27.0% from 25 to 44, 28.0% from 45 to 64, and 6.0% 65 or older. The median age was 38 years. For every 100 females, there were 101.7 males. For every 100 females age 18 and over, there were 99.2 males.

The median household income was $100,373 and the median family income was $104,337. Males had a median income of $75,209 versus $34,417 for females. The per capita income for the CDP was $39,552. About 1.7% of families and 2.0% of the population were below the poverty line, including 2.0% of those under age 18 and 1.2% of those age 65 or over.
