= Cyrus Broadwell House =

Historic house in Ohio, United States

- U.S. National Register of Historic Places
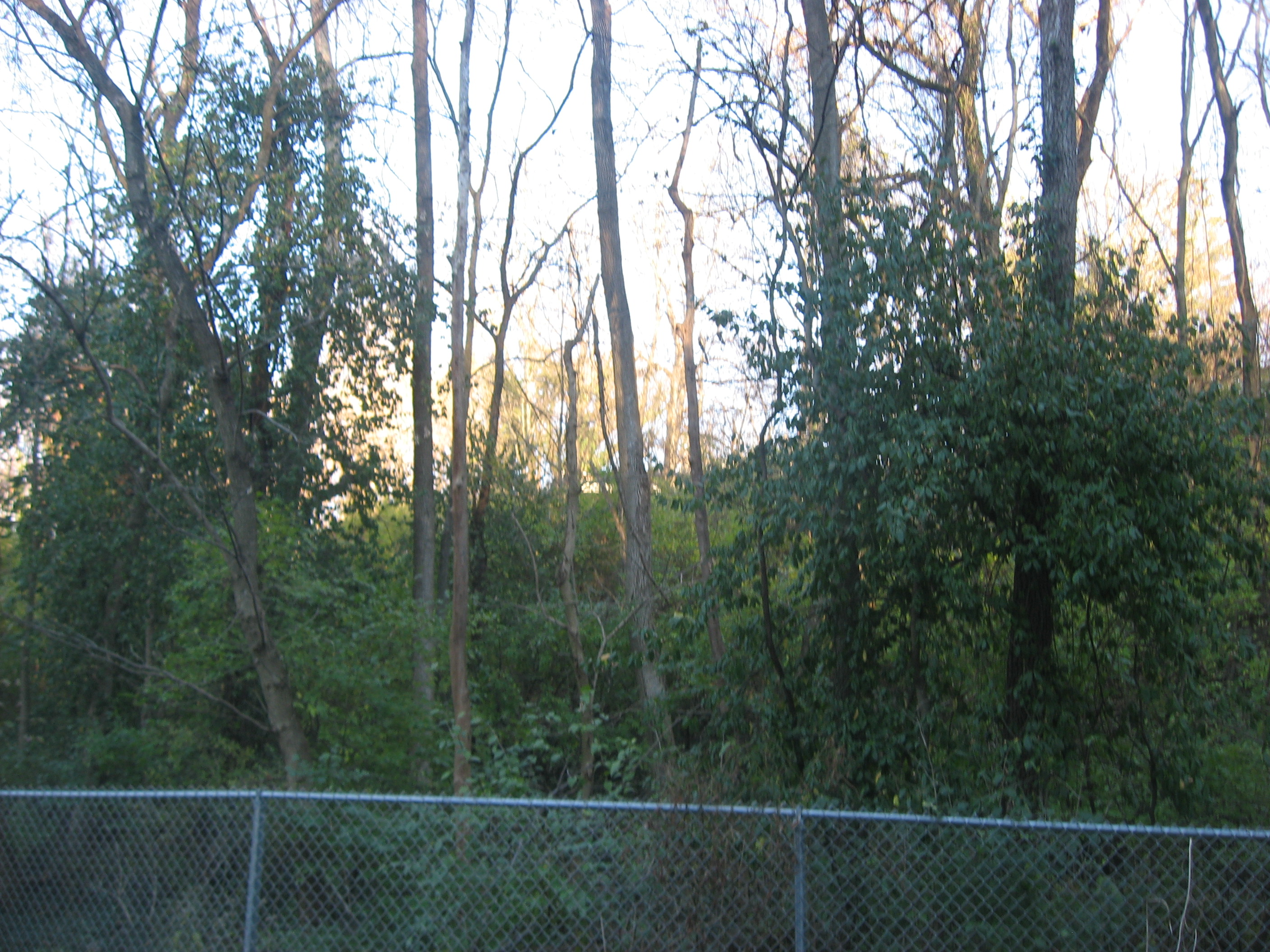
- Seen from Mount Carmel Road

- Location within Ohio Location within the United States
- Interactive map showing the location of Cyrus Broadwell House
- Location: Vicinity of Newtown, Ohio
- Coordinates: 39°7′58″N 84°18′35″W
- Built: 1820
- Architect: Cyrus Broadwell
- Architectural style: Greek Revival
- NRHP reference No.: 75001433
- Added to NRHP: May 29, 1975

Cyrus Broadwell House is a registered historic building near Newtown, Ohio, listed in the National Register on May 29, 1975. It was built in 1820 by Cyrus Broadwell (born 1801, died 1879) in the Greek Revival style. It has 23 columns, 12 feet high. It is currently a private residence.

Former owners included Hamilton County prosecutor John V. Campbell.

Not to be confused with the Broadwell House of the Cincinnati Country Day School, built ca. 1804 by John Broadwell, located about 5 miles to the north.

== Historic Uses ==
- Single Dwelling
