= Harrison–Landers House =

- U.S. National Register of Historic Places
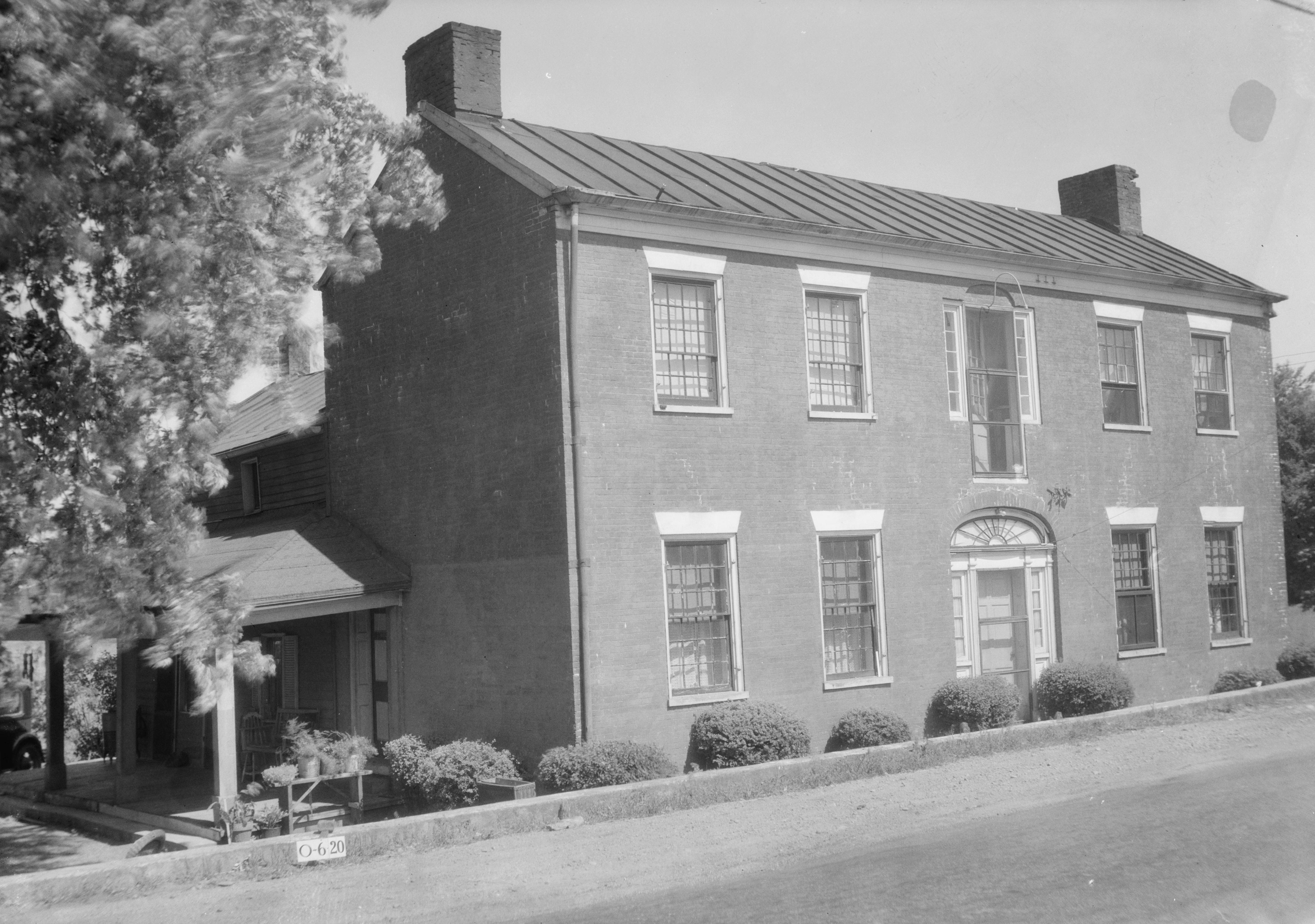
- Front of the house in 1937

- Location within Ohio Location within the United States
- Location: 3881 Newtown Road, Newtown, Ohio, United States
- Coordinates: 39°8′3″N 84°21′18″W
- Area: 1 acre (0.40 ha)
- Architect: P. Harrison
- Architectural style: Federal
- NRHP reference No.: 75001434
- Added to NRHP: May 29, 1975

The Harrison–Landers House was a historic Federal-style residence near the village of Newtown in Hamilton County, Ohio, United States. Built in the first quarter of the 19th century, it served a range of residential and commercial purposes throughout its obscure history, but enough of its history was known to permit its designation as a historic site in the 1970s.

The house was built by a Mr. P. Harrison in the early 19th century, seemingly between 1815 and 1825, using the then-popular Federal style of architecture. Executed in brick, the design included standard Federal elements such as the chimneys atop the gabled ends of the house and a fanlight at the entrance. Additional exterior components included brick lintels for the windows and a brick archway surrounding the main entrance. In its earlier years, the house possessed rich fireplace mantels and cupboards, but surveyors from the Historic American Buildings Survey in the 1930s noted that they had been removed by an owner who had no interest in the house's history.

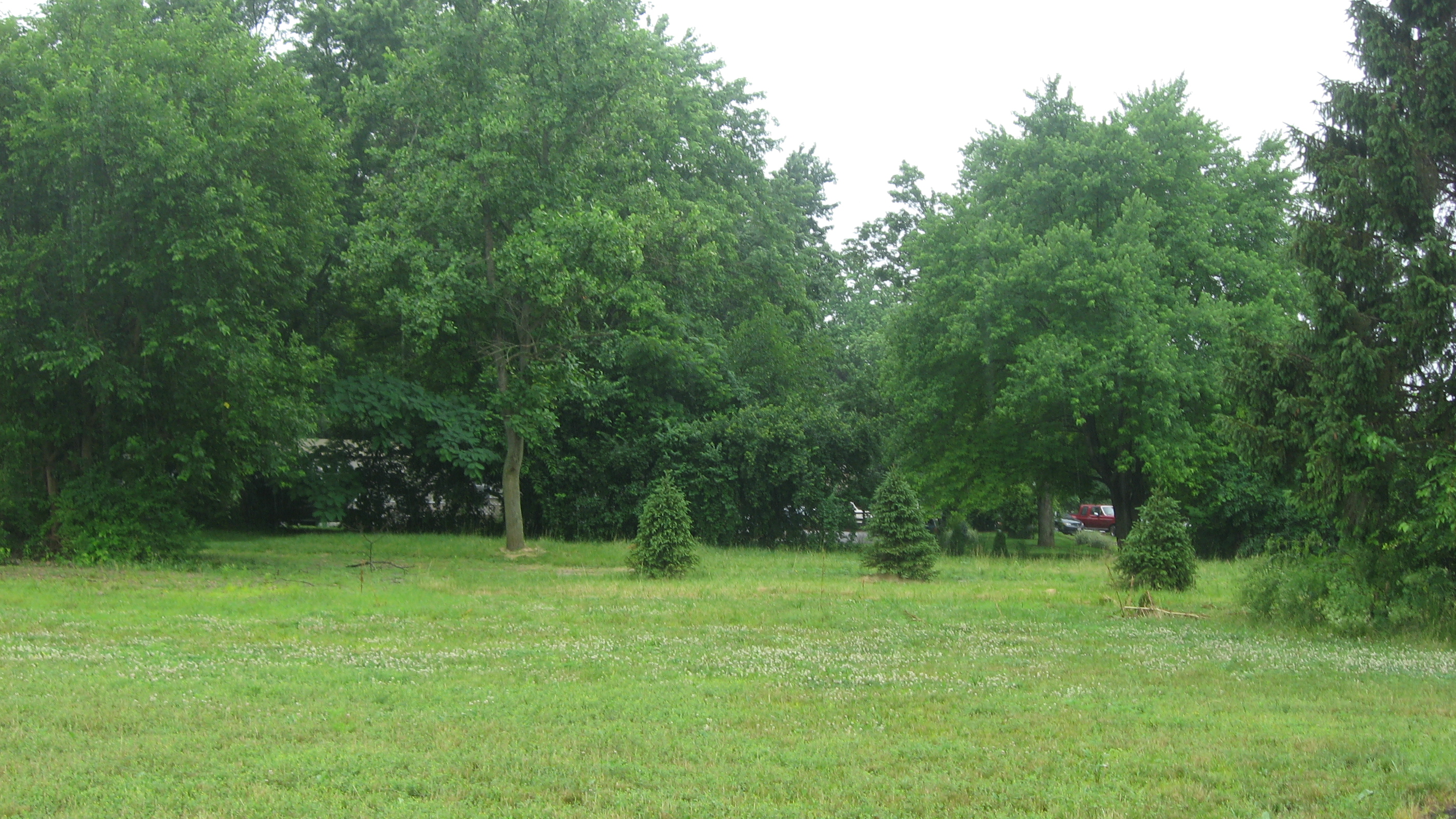
Site of the house

Mr. Harrison was related by marriage to a prominent citizen of early Newtown, the miller Nathaniel Armstrong. Members of Armstrong's family later owned a carding mill in Newtown, and years after Harrison's residence at the house, it was known as the "Armstrong Mill". Comparatively little is known about its historic uses (the 1930s surveyors noted that the only sources of information were the current owner and one other local resident), although it appears to have been used for commercial purposes: located on the road from Newtown to Plainville, it was employed as a saloon and tavern, primarily by farmers taking their animals to market. By the late twentieth century, it had been converted into a boarding house.

In 1975, the house was listed on the National Register of Historic Places under the name of "Harrison–Landers House", deriving the latter half of its name from the family that occupied it in the 1930s. It qualified for designation because of its historically significant architecture, which closely resembled that of the James Whallon House in Greenhills to the northwest. Historic designation has not been enough to preserve the house, which has been demolished.
