= Cherry Grove, Ohio =

- Census-designated place
- Location in Hamilton County and the state of Ohio.
- Coordinates: 39°04′49″N 84°19′19″W
- Country: United States
- State: Ohio
- County: Hamilton

Area
  - Total: 1.13 sq mi (2.93 km^{2})
  - Land: 1.13 sq mi (2.93 km^{2})
  - Water: 0 sq mi (0.00 km^{2})
- Elevation: 886 ft (270 m)

Population (2020)
  - Total: 4,419
  - Density: 3,902.0/sq mi (1,506.57/km^{2})
- Time zone: UTC-5 (Eastern (EST))
  - Summer (DST): UTC-4 (EDT)
- ZIP code: 45255
- Area codes: 283 and 513
- FIPS code: 39-13848
- GNIS feature ID: 2393374

Cherry Grove is a census-designated place (CDP) in Anderson Township, Hamilton County, Ohio, United States. The population was 4,419 at the 2020 census.

== Geography ==
According to the United States Census Bureau, the CDP has a total area of 1.1 square miles (2.8 km^{2}), all land.

== Demographics ==
Historical population
Census	Pop.	Note	%±
2020	4,419		—
U.S. Decennial Census

=== 2020 census ===
As of the 2020 census, Cherry Grove had a population of 4,419, for a population density of 3,903.71 people per square mile (1,506.57/km^{2}).

The median age was 38.2 years. 27.9% of residents were under the age of 18 and 15.2% of residents were 65 years of age or older. For every 100 females there were 90.1 males, and for every 100 females age 18 and over there were 90.9 males age 18 and over.

There were 1,511 households in Cherry Grove, of which 41.1% had children under the age of 18 living in them. Of all households, 66.2% were married-couple households, 10.7% were households with a male householder and no spouse or partner present, and 19.5% were households with a female householder and no spouse or partner present. About 15.8% of all households were made up of individuals and 8.7% had someone living alone who was 65 years of age or older. The average household size was 2.81 and the average family size was 3.23.

There were 1,545 housing units, of which 2.2% were vacant. The homeowner vacancy rate was 0.6% and the rental vacancy rate was 0.0%. 100.0% of residents lived in urban areas, while 0.0% lived in rural areas.

Racial composition as of the 2020 census
Race	Number	Percent
White	3,987	90.2%
Black or African American	72	1.6%
American Indian and Alaska Native	7	0.2%
Asian	77	1.7%
Native Hawaiian and Other Pacific Islander	2	0.0%
Some other race	34	0.8%
Two or more races	240	5.4%
Hispanic or Latino (of any race)	107	2.4%

=== Income and poverty ===
According to the U.S. Census American Community Survey, for the period 2016-2020 the estimated median annual income for a household in the CDP was $94,223, and the median income for a family was $108,558. About 3.6% of the population were living below the poverty line, including 1.9% of those under age 18 and 4.0% of those age 65 or over. About 71.0% of the population were employed, and 45.8% had a bachelor's degree or higher.

=== 2000 census ===
At the 2000 census there were 4,555 people, 1,524 households, and 1,342 families living in the CDP. The population density was 4,038.2 inhabitants per square mile (1,559.2/km^{2}). There were 1,545 housing units at an average density of 1,369.7 per square mile (528.8/km^{2}). The racial makeup of the CDP was 96.07% White, 1.19% African American, 0.09% Native American, 1.65% Asian, 0.09% Pacific Islander, 0.40% from other races, and 0.53% from two or more races. Hispanic or Latino of any race were 0.94%.

Of the 1,524 households 44.6% had children under the age of 18 living with them, 76.8% were married couples living together, 8.8% had a female householder with no husband present, and 11.9% were non-families. 10.3% of households were one person and 3.9% were one person aged 65 or older. The average household size was 2.99 and the average family size was 3.21.

The age distribution was 30.0% under the age of 18, 6.8% from 18 to 24, 27.9% from 25 to 44, 25.4% from 45 to 64, and 10.0% 65 or older. The median age was 37 years. For every 100 females, there were 93.7 males. For every 100 females age 18 and over, there were 91.5 males.

The median household income was $65,486 and the median family income was $68,365. Males had a median income of $45,357 versus $31,833 for females. The per capita income for the CDP was $23,706. About 0.5% of families and 0.5% of the population were below the poverty line, including none of those under age 18 and 1.7% of those age 65 or over.
