= Forest Hills Local School District =

School district in Ohio

Location
- Anderson Township Cincinnati metropolitan area United States

District information
- Type: Public
- Motto: ENGAGE • EMPOWER • EXCEL
- Superintendent: Larry Hook
- Schools: Anderson High School; Ayer Elementary School; Maddux Elementary School; Mercer Elementary School; Nagel Middle School; Sherwood Elementary School; Summit Elementary School; Turpin High School; Wilson Elementary School

Students and staff
- Students: approx. 1,200
- Staff: 1,008

Other information
- Website: www.foresthills.edu

Forest Hills Local School District is a public school district serving the southeasternmost area of Hamilton County, Ohio outside the city of Cincinnati. The district specifically serves approximately 7,600 students from Anderson Township and the village of Newtown. There are 1,008 staff members working for the district.

The district has been rated excellent or excellent with distinction for the 12 consecutive years based on the State Report Card. It consists of nine schools:

| School | Principal | Year built | Grades | Enrollment | Staff |
|---|---|---|---|---|---|
| Anderson High School | Kyle Fender | 1961 | 9–12 | 1,199 | 168 |
| Ayer Elementary School | Heather Hoelle | 1973 | K–6 | 628 | 67 |
| Maddux Elementary School | Joy O’Brien | 1966 | K–6 | 617 | 49 |
| Mercer Elementary School | Jodi Davidson | 1973 | K–6 | 728 | 112 |
| Nagel Middle School | Tiffany Brennan | 1999 | 7–8 | 1,876 | 116 |
| Sherwood Elementary School | Dan Hamilton | 1970 | K–6 | 568 | 52 |
| Summit Elementary School | Michele Sulfsted | 1968 | K–6 | 532 | 60 |
| Turpin High School | Andy Jados | 1976 | 9–12 | 1,100 | 112 |
| Wilson Elementary School | Erin Storer | 1959 (rebuilt 2017) | K–6 | 639 | 56 |
| Total | | | | 7,987 | 792 (not including the 216 administrative staff) |

The student progression from elementary to middle to high school in Forest Hills is noteworthy. There are six neighborhood elementary schools, all of which feed Nagel Middle School. Nagel students are then again divided based on their home addresses between the two high schools. Anderson High School gets all students from Ayer, Maddux and Summit Elementaries. Turpin gets all students from Wilson and Mercer Elementaries. Sherwood Elementary students are split between Anderson and Turpin, depending on street address; students on a few designated "swing" streets may choose either high school.

The Forest Hills school board has been the subject of public criticism and a lawsuit following its June 2022 resolution banning "anti-racism" teachings in schools. Board member Sara Jonas was quoted as saying the measure was brought forth "just to make sure that both sides are always being taught to the students". The board received further criticism in September 2023 after superintendent Larry Hook had a student mural promoting equality painted over. In December 2023, the lawsuit against the board ended in a settlement, the details of which were not disclosed, though the board said the settlement cost would be covered by its liability insurance. The board rescinded the resolution later that month.
