= International F-17 Sportsman =

F-17 Sportsman
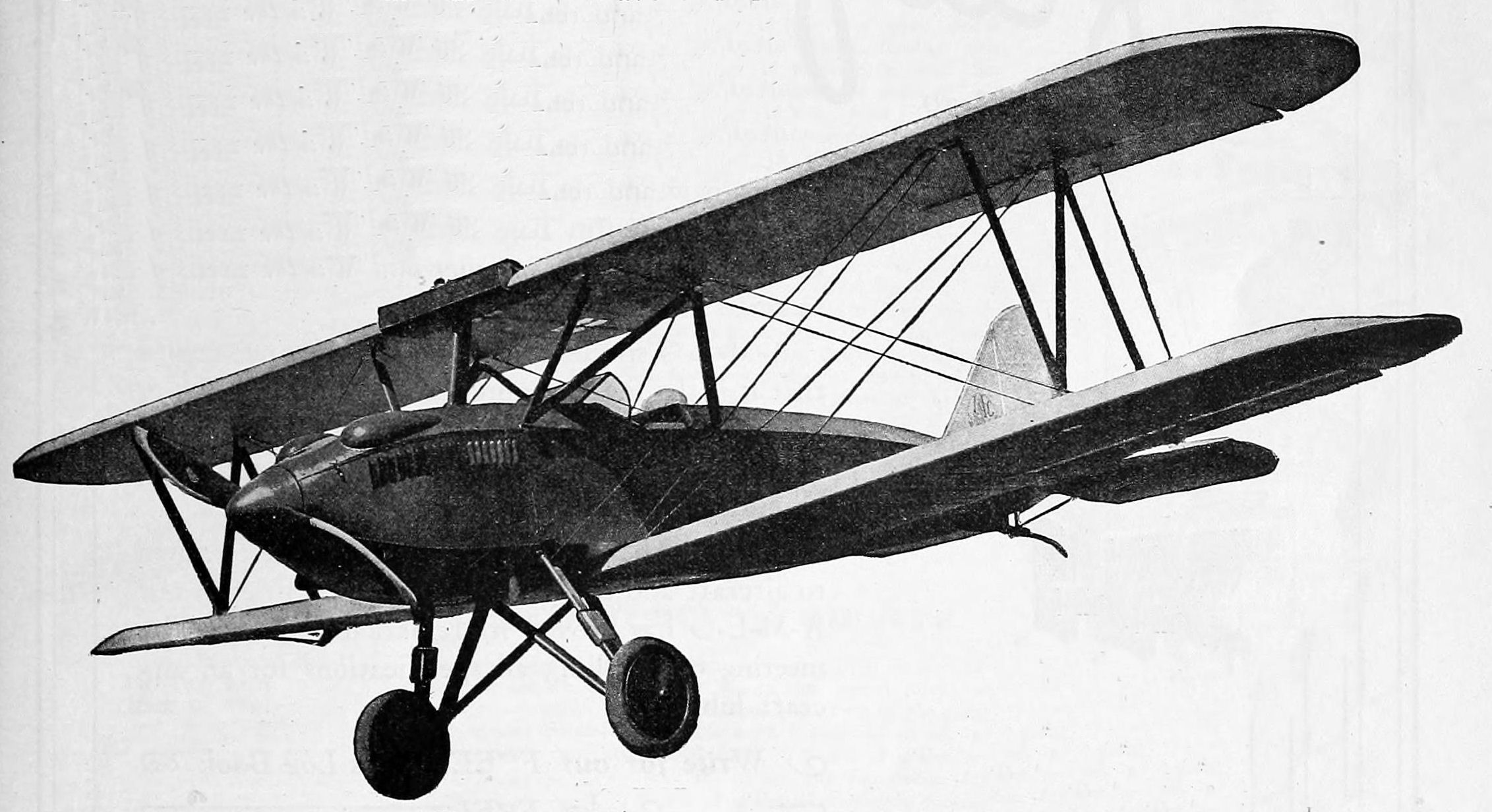

General information
- Type: Three-seat biplane
- Manufacturer: International Aircraft
- Number built: 20+

History
- First flight: 1920s

The International F-17 Sportsman was a 1920s American three-seat open-cockpit biplane designed and manufactured by the International Aircraft Corporation in Long Beach, California and Cincinnati, Ohio. 107 aircraft were built, 77 of them at Cincinnati.

In 1928, a Sportsman won the "On to Dallas" race.

== Variants ==
Data from:

F-17 Sportsman
powered by a 90 hp (67 kW) Curtiss OX-5 water-cooled V-8 or 100–120 hp (75–89 kW) Dayton Bear air-cooled 4-cylinder in-line engine.

F-17H Sportsman
powered by, 180 hp (130 kW) Wright-Hisso E, Siemens-Halske, Dayton Bear or Curtiss K-6 engines.

F-17H Mailman
A single seat air mail carrier / cargo version of the 17H.

F-17W Sportsman
powered by a 200 hp (150 kW) Wright J-5

== Operators ==
United States

- Airads
- Anderson Airlines
- Cherry-Red Airlines
- Crescent Air Services
- Galt Union High School

== Specifications (F-17) ==
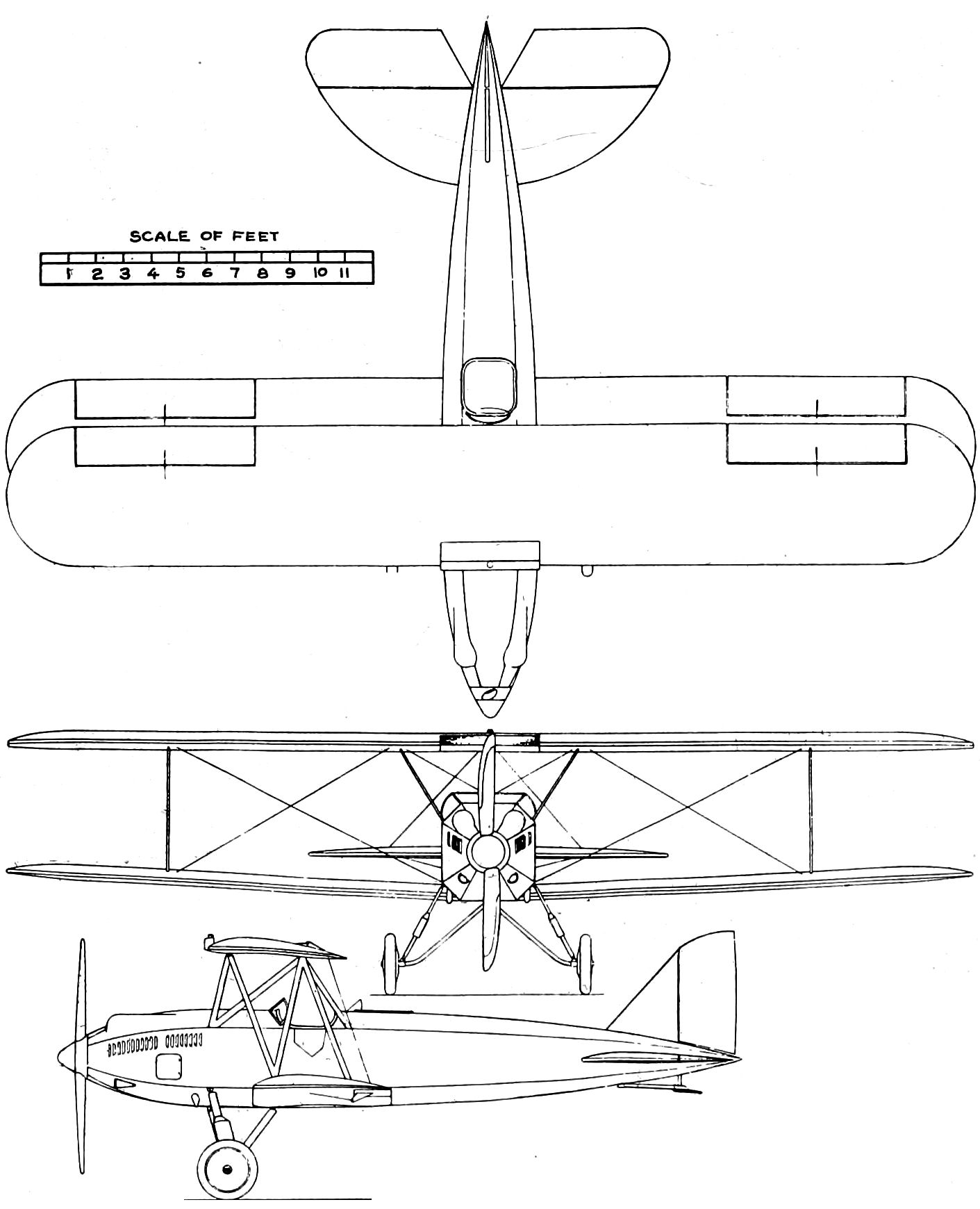
International F-17 3-view drawing from Aero Digest January 1928

Data from , Jane's all the World's Aircraft 1928

General characteristics

- Crew: 1
- Capacity: 2, 660 lb (300 kg) payload
- Length: 25 ft 0 in (7.62 m)
- Wingspan: 35 ft 0 in (10.67 m)
- Height: 9 ft 6 in (2.90 m)
- Wing area: 325 sq ft (30.2 m^{2})
- Empty weight: 1,300 lb (590 kg) OX-5

1,400 lb (640 kg) Hisso E
1,350 lb (610 kg) Whirlwind

- Gross weight: 2,121 lb (962 kg) OX-5

2,539 lb (1,152 kg) Hisso E
2,589 lb (1,174 kg) Whirlwind

- Powerplant: 1 × Curtiss OX-5 V-8 water-cooled piston engine, 90 hp (67 kW)

150 hp (110 kW) Hisso E V-8
200 hp (150 kW) Wright J-5 Whirlwind 9-cyl radial

- Propellers: 2-bladed wooden fixed-pitch propeller

Performance

- Maximum speed: 98 mph (158 km/h, 85 kn) OX-5 engine

120 mph (100 kn; 190 km/h) Hisso E
150 mph (130 kn; 240 km/h) Whirlwind

- Cruise speed: 82 mph (132 km/h, 71 kn) OX-5 engine

105 mph (91 kn; 169 km/h) Hisso E
120 mph (100 kn; 190 km/h) Whirlwind

- Landing speed: 35 mph (30 kn; 56 km/h)
- Range: 325 mi (523 km, 282 nmi)
- Service ceiling: 10,500 ft (3,200 m) OX-5 engine

1,200 ft (370 m) Hisso E
16,000 ft (4,900 m) Whirlwind

- Rate of climb: 600 ft/min (3.0 m/s) OX-5 engine

800 ft/min (4.1 m/s) Hisso E
1,000 ft/min (5.1 m/s) Whirlwind

- Wing loading: 6.52 lb/sq ft (31.8 kg/m^{2}) OX-5 engine

7.8 lb/sq ft (38 kg/m^{2}) Hisso E
7.86 lb/sq ft (38.4 kg/m^{2}) Whirlwind

- Power/mass: 0.0424 hp/lb (0.1 kW/kg) OX-5

0.0592 hp/lb (0.1 kW/kg) Hisso E
0.0782 hp/lb (0.1 kW/kg) Whirlwind
