= Turpin High School =

Location
- 2650 Bartels Road; Cincinnati, Ohio 45244; United States; 39°6′15″N 84°22′0″W

Information
- Type: Public, Coeducational high school
- Established: 1976; 50 years ago
- School district: Forest Hills Local School District
- Superintendent: Larry Hook
- Principal: Andy Jados
- Teaching staff: 65.25 (FTE)
- Grades: 9-12
- Enrollment: 1,002 (2023-2024)
- Student to teacher ratio: 15.36
- Colors: Maroon and Gold
- Fight song: Across the Field
- Athletics conference: Eastern Cincinnati Conference
- Nickname: Spartans
- Rival: Anderson High School
- Accreditation: North Central Association of Colleges and Schools
- Yearbook: The Odyssey
- Website: www.foresthills.edu/turpin
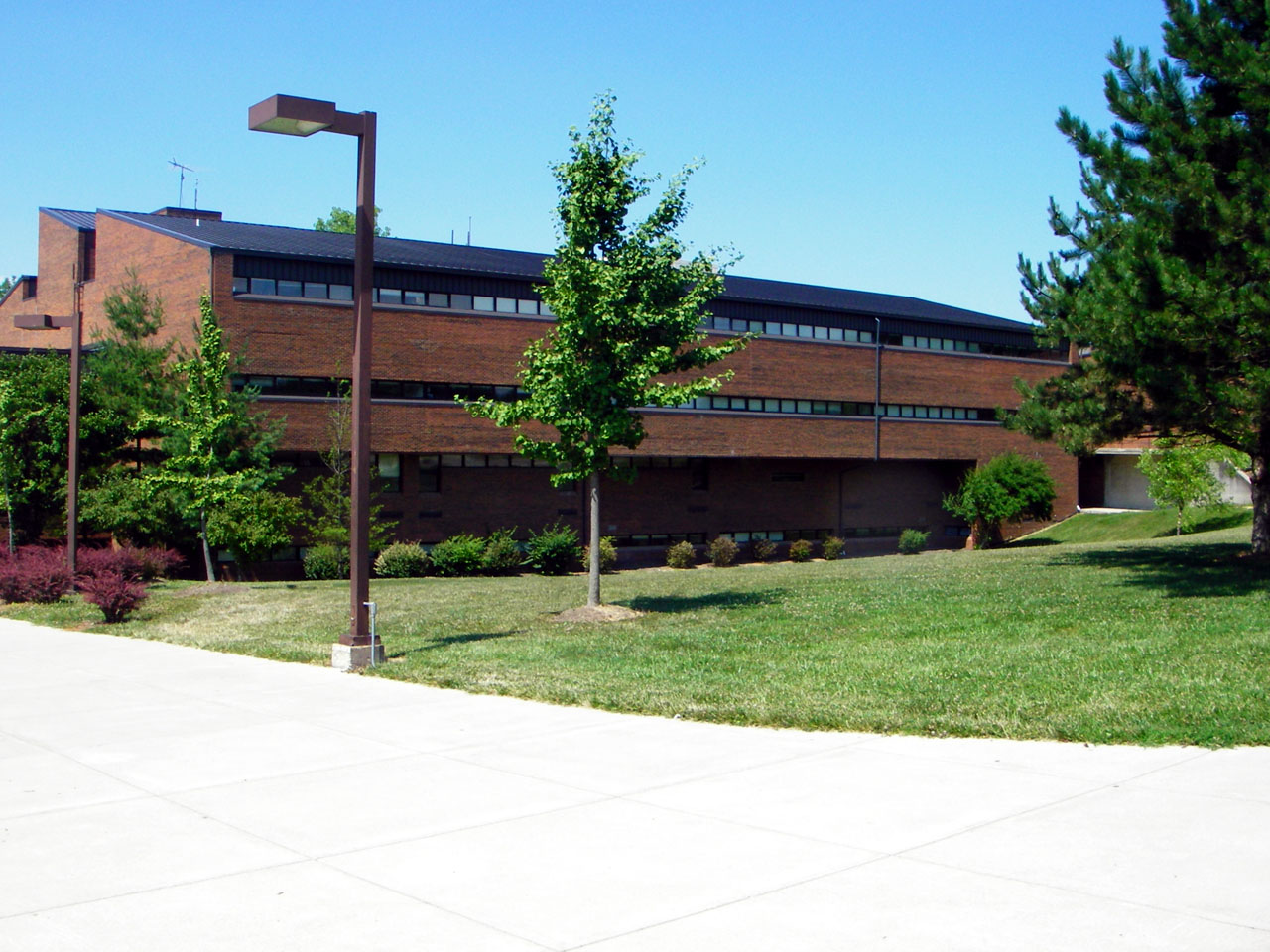

Turpin High School is a public high school in Cincinnati, Ohio, United States that serves grades nine through twelve. The school is part of the Forest Hills Local School District and serves the suburb of Anderson Township; admission is based primarily on the location of a student's home. Turpin is accredited by the Ohio Department of Education and the North Central Association of Secondary Schools and Colleges. Turpin is a member of the Ohio Association of College Admissions Counselors and of the National Association of College Admissions Counselors.

== History ==
Turpin High School was opened in September 1976. It featured an open concept floor plan, with classrooms lacking separation. Original plans for the school called for an auditorium, but the design had to be scaled back due to cost overruns. After years of delay, a bond issue was passed and the auditorium was completed in 1999. Turpin was renovated and an auxiliary gym added in 2019. In 2022, Turpin added an outdoor classroom funded by the school's PTO.

The school received national attention when, in 2022, students staged a walk-out to protest the cancellation of a Diversity Day and one of the students spoke in front of a Congressional subcommittee.

== Campus ==
The school consists of four main parts: an auditorium, a center section with a cafeteria and classrooms, a gymnasium, and an auxiliary gym. The campus also includes athletic facilities which include a uniquely shaped baseball stadium (due to a lack of flat land area) which has undergone several major improvements and renovations in recent years (2005-2006). The campus also includes tennis courts, practice fields, softball fields, weight lifting facilities, and track and field areas.

== Academics ==
As of 2026, Turpin offers twenty six Advanced Placement courses.

== Extracurricular activities ==
=== Athletics ===
Turpin High School is a member of the Ohio High School Athletic Association (OHSAA) and participates in the Eastern Cincinnati Conference. Turpin's athletic programs include, for boys and girls, cross country, golf, soccer, tennis, basketball, bowling, diving, swimming, and track and field. Boys may also participate in lacrosse, baseball, football and wrestling. Girls may also participate in volleyball and softball.

Marching band, cheerleading, dance team, and academic quiz team are also offered at various times throughout the school year.

==== Ohio High School Athletic Association State Championships ====
Turpin has won the following state championships:

- Girls Cross Country - 2001
- Boys Soccer - 1986, 2000, 2001
- Girls Soccer - 1986, 1996

== Notable alumni ==
- John Arthur — husband of Jim Obergefell, named plaintiff in Obergefell v. Hodges, the Supreme Court case recognizing the Constitutional right to same-sex marriage
- Jim Leyritz — professional baseball player
- Marc Burch — professional soccer player
- Bryan Devendorf — drummer and founding member of The National
- Scott Devendorf — bassist and founding member of The National
- Bill Barrett (swimmer) — Olympic swimmer
