= International F-18 Air-Coach =

F-18 Air Coach
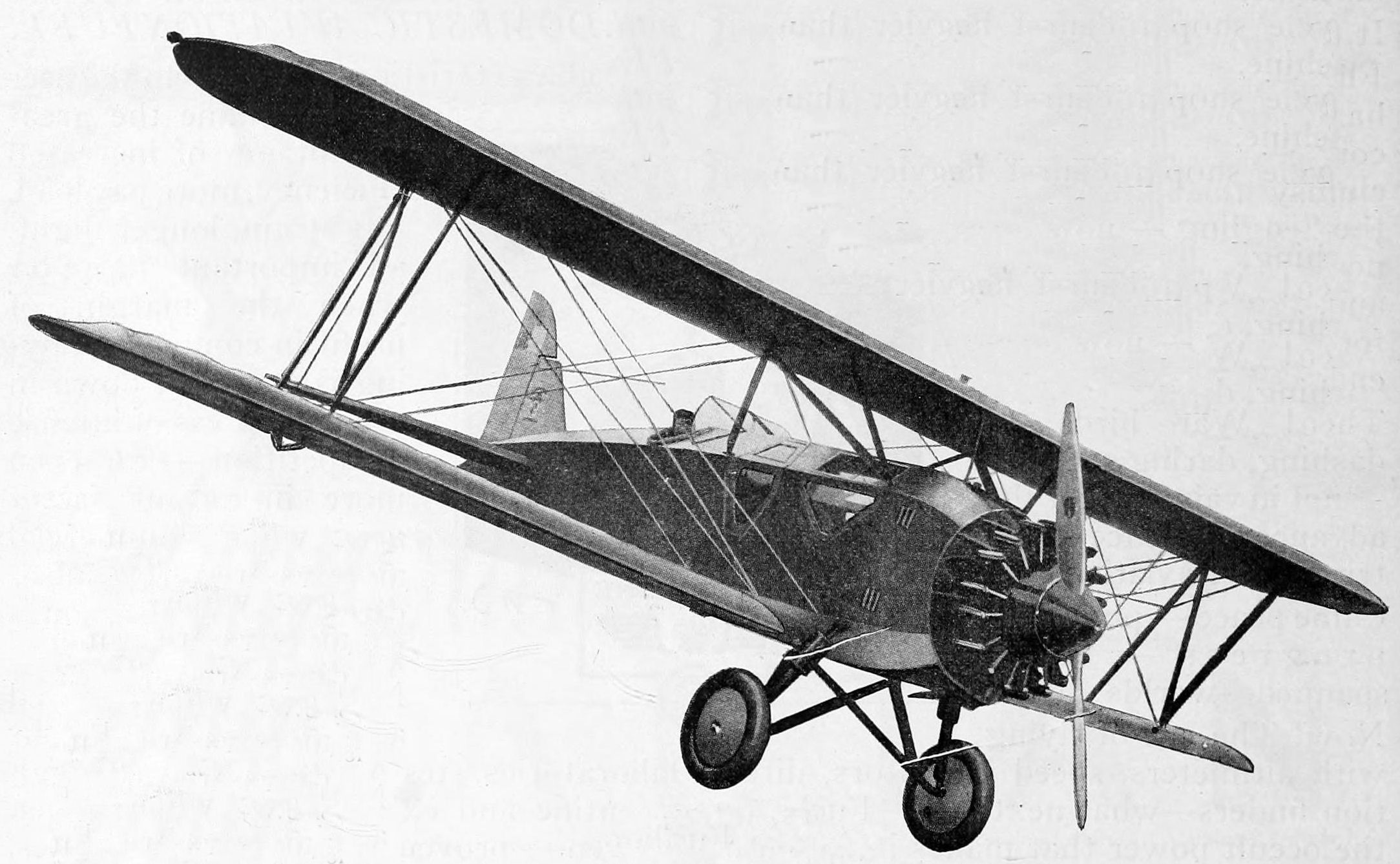

General information
- Type: Seven-seat biplane transport
- Manufacturer: International Aircraft
- Number built: 6

History
- First flight: 1920s

The International F-18 Air Coach was a 1920s American biplane transport that was designed and manufactured by the International Aircraft Corporation in Long Beach, California. The company stopped manufacturing F-18's by 1928 and sold its rights to the aircraft in 1931.

Only six F-18's were ever built. One these aircraft, Miss Hollydale, was entered to fly in the 1927 Dole Air Race between Northern California and Hawaii, but the pilot withdrew from the competition before it began.

The F-18 initially had a cabin for four passengers and an open cockpit with side-by-side seating for a pilot and a fifth passenger. Later versions had an enclosed cabin. It was furnished with seat covers made by Cincinnati Auto Specialty Company.

== Operators ==
United States

- Airads
- Burdette Airlines
- Coast Airlines

== Specifications (F-18) ==
Data from

General characteristics

- Crew: 1
- Capacity: 6
- Length: 26 ft 6 in (8.08 m)
- Wingspan: 37 ft 0 in (11.28 m)
- Powerplant: 1 × Wright J-5 nine-cylinder air-cooled radial piston engine, 220 hp (160 kW)

Performance

- Maximum speed: 120 mph (190 km/h, 100 kn)
- Cruise speed: 95 mph (153 km/h, 83 kn)
- Stall speed: 40 mph (64 km/h, 35 kn)
- Range: 525 mi (845 km, 456 nmi)
