= Coldstream, Ohio =

- Census-designated place
- Location in Hamilton County and the state of Ohio.
- Coordinates: 39°02′53″N 84°20′50″W
- Country: United States
- State: Ohio
- County: Hamilton

Area
  - Total: 2.86 sq mi (7.42 km^{2})
  - Land: 2.78 sq mi (7.21 km^{2})
  - Water: 0.081 sq mi (0.21 km^{2})
- Elevation: 817 ft (249 m)

Population (2020)
  - Total: 1,322
  - Density: 474.7/sq mi (183.27/km^{2})
- Time zone: UTC-5 (Eastern (EST))
  - Summer (DST): UTC-4 (EDT)
- FIPS code: 39-16521
- GNIS feature ID: 2585503

Coldstream is a census-designated place (CDP) in southern Anderson Township, Hamilton County, Ohio, United States. The population was 1,322 at the 2020 census.

== Geography ==
Coldstream is located near the southeastern corner of Hamilton County. It is situated between Interstate 275 and the Ohio River. The CDP takes its name from the Coldstream Country Club and occupies the bluffs overlooking the Ohio River.

According to the United States Census Bureau, the CDP has a total area of 2.9 square miles (7.4 km^{2}), of which 2.8 square miles (7.2 km^{2}) is land and 0.077 square miles (0.2 km^{2}), or 2.94%, is water.

== Demographics ==
As of the census of 2020, there were 1,322 people living in the CDP, for a population density of 474.69 people per square mile (183.27/km^{2}). There were 482 housing units. The racial makeup of the CDP was 92.4% White, 1.1% Black or African American, 0.0% Native American, 1.5% Asian, 0.0% Pacific Islander, 0.8% from some other race, and 4.2% from two or more races. 2.3% of the population were Hispanic or Latino of any race.

There were 450 households, out of which 43.3% had children under the age of 18 living with them, 81.1% were married couples living together, 14.4% had a male householder with no spouse present, and 3.3% had a female householder with no spouse present. 7.3% of all households were made up of individuals, and 1.8% were someone living alone who was 65 years of age or older. The average household size was 3.25, and the average family size was 3.44.

32.1% of the CDP's population were under the age of 18, 55.0% were 18 to 64, and 12.9% were 65 years of age or older. The median age was 38.3. For every 100 females, there were 94.5 males.

According to the U.S. Census American Community Survey, for the period 2016-2020 the estimated median annual income for a household in the CDP was $143,214, and the median income for a family was $250,000. About 3.8% of the population were living below the poverty line, including 11.9% of those under age 18 and 0.0% of those age 65 or over. About 66.5% of the population were employed, and 83.6% had a bachelor's degree or higher.
