= Chris Norwell =

American football coach (born 1985)

Current position
- Title: Head coach
- Team: Thomas More
- Conference: G-MAC
- Record: 16–28

Biographical details
- Born: February 12, 1985 (age 41); Cincinnati, Ohio, U.S.
- Education: Illinois University (2007)

Playing career
- 2003–2007: Illinois
- 2008: New England Patriots*
- 2008: Minnesota Vikings*
- Position: Defensive tackle

Coaching career (HC unless noted)
- 2009–2013: Thomas More (assistant)
- 2014–2021: Thomas More (DC)
- 2022–present: Thomas More

Head coaching record
- Overall: 16–28

Christopher Reinhard Norwell (born February 12, 1985) is an American college football coach. He is the head football coach for Thomas More University, a position he has held since 2022. He played college football for Illinois and professionally for the New England Patriots and Minnesota Vikings of the National Football League (NFL) as a defensive tackle.

== Personal life ==
Norwell's younger brother, Andrew, is a guard who most recently played for the Washington Commanders.

== Head coaching record ==
Year	Team	Overall	Conference	Standing	Bowl/playoffs
Thomas More Saints (Mid-South Conference) (2022)
2022	Thomas More	5–6	4–4	5th	
Thomas More Saints (Great Midwest Athletic Conference) (2023–present)
2023	Thomas More	5–6	4–5	6th	
2024	Thomas More	5–6	4–5	T–5th	
2025	Thomas More	1–10	1–8	9th	
Thomas More:		16–28	13–22		
Total:		16–28			
