= Perin Village Site =

Archaeological site in Ohio, United States

- U.S. National Register of Historic Places
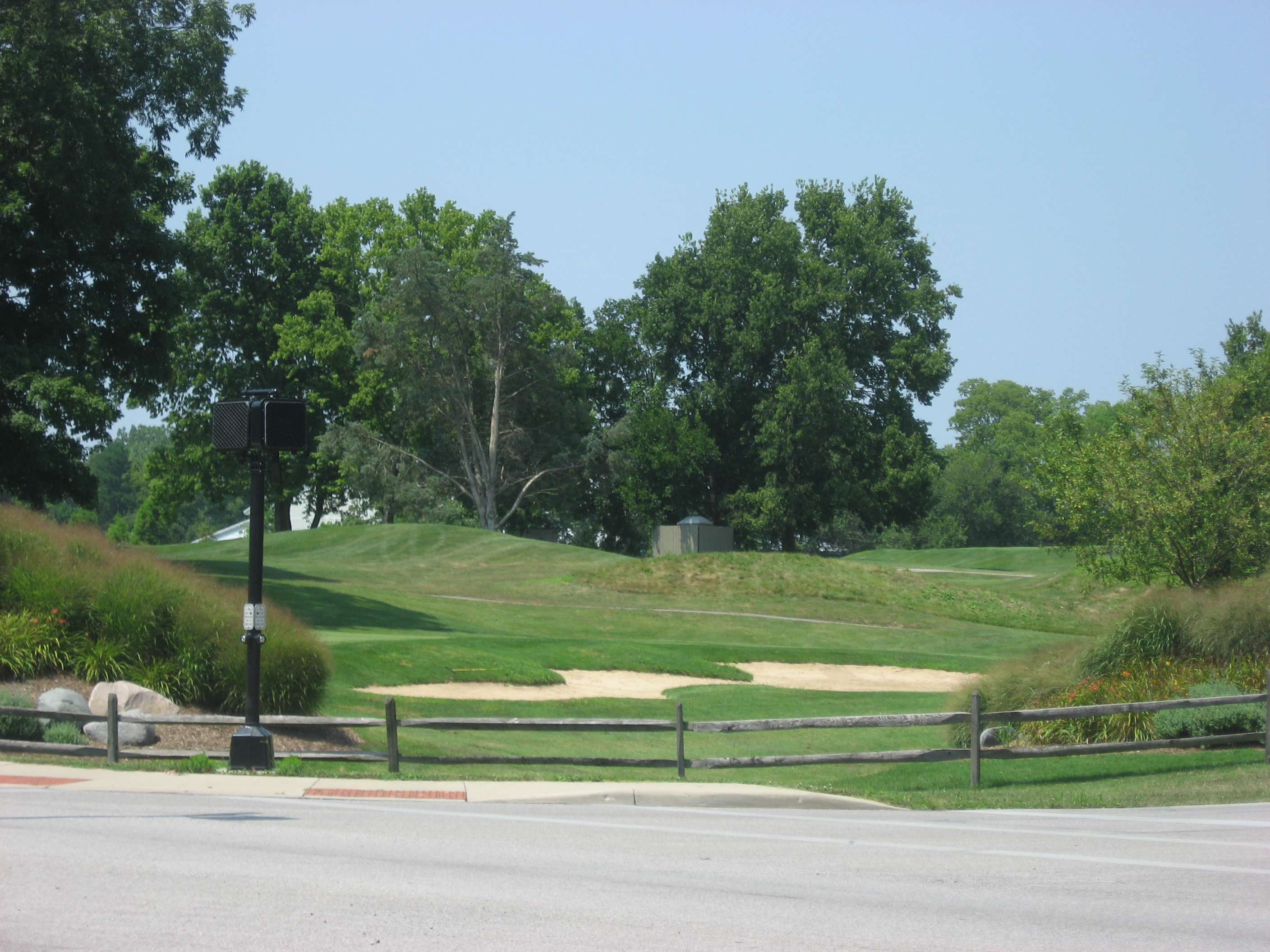
- Overview of the Perin Site, now a golf course

- Location within Ohio Location within the United States
- Location: 0.3 miles northwest of the Odd Fellows' Cemetery
- Nearest city: Newtown, Ohio
- Coordinates: 39°7′49″N 84°21′36″W
- Area: 80 acres (32 ha)
- NRHP reference No.: 77001067
- Added to NRHP: March 25, 1977

The Perin Village Site is an archaeological site in the southwestern part of the U.S. state of Ohio. Located in Newtown in Hamilton County, it is believed to have been inhabited by peoples of the Hopewell tradition.

Perin Village is part of a prehistoric complex of earthworks in the Newtown vicinity; other sites in the complex include the Odd Fellows' Cemetery Mound, approximately 0.3 miles (0.48 km) to the southeast, and the large Turner Earthworks. A mound was once located at the site; when it was destroyed for the purpose of improving a roadway in the late 1870s, it yielded many bones and pieces of charcoal. Two portions of the village site are especially rich in artifacts; however, the site, 80 acres (32 ha) in total, has a less dense concentration of surface artifacts than many other sites in the region due to its location near the Little Miami River — many floods during the site's history have covered earlier artifacts with layers of silt. It is believed that a detailed excavation of Perin Village would yield evidence of houses, hearths, middens, and burial sites. A small number of "Hopewell-like" artifacts were once removed from the site by local resident Frederick Starr; his collection is now housed at the Cincinnati Museum of Natural History and Science.

The archaeological value of the Perin Village Site led to its placement on the National Register of Historic Places in 1977, four years after a similar status was accorded to the Odd Fellows' Cemetery Mound.
