= Sherwood, Hamilton County, Ohio =

Sherwood, Ohio
- Census-designated place
- Location in Hamilton County and the state of Ohio
- Coordinates: 39°05′07″N 84°21′39″W
- Country: United States
- State: Ohio
- County: Hamilton

Area
  - Total: 1.1 sq mi (2.9 km^{2})
  - Land: 1.1 sq mi (2.9 km^{2})
  - Water: 0 sq mi (0.0 km^{2})
- Elevation: 728 ft (222 m)

Population (2020)
  - Total: 3,633
  - Density: 3,244.6/sq mi (1,252.76/km^{2})
- Time zone: UTC-5 (Eastern (EST))
  - Summer (DST): UTC-4 (EDT)
- FIPS code: 39-72252
- GNIS feature ID: 2393233

Sherwood is a census-designated place (CDP) in Anderson Township, Hamilton County, Ohio, United States. The population was 3,633 at the 2020 census.

== Geography ==
According to the United States Census Bureau, the CDP has a total area of 1.1 square miles (2.9 km^{2}), all land.

== Demographics ==
=== 2020 census ===
As of the census of 2020, there were 3,633 people living in the CDP, for a population density of 3,302.73 people per square mile (1,252.76/km^{2}). There were 1,380 housing units. The racial makeup of the CDP was 91.6% White, 1.5% Black or African American, 0.1%% Native American, 2.0% Asian, 0.0% Pacific Islander, 0.5% from some other race, and 4.3% from two or more races. 2.1% of the population were Hispanic or Latino of any race.

There were 1,413 households, out of which 25.7% had children under the age of 18 living with them, 53.8% were married couples living together, 13.4% had a male householder with no spouse present, and 30.3% had a female householder with no spouse present. 16.9% of all households were made up of individuals, and 12.6% were someone living alone who was 65 years of age or older. The average household size was 2.47, and the average family size was 2.72.

22.0% of the CDP's population were under the age of 18, 58.4% were 18 to 64, and 19.6% were 65 years of age or older. The median age was 49.4. For every 100 females, there were 75.8 males.

According to the U.S. Census American Community Survey, for the period 2016-2020 the estimated median annual income for a household in the CDP was $130,152, and the median income for a family was $138,228. About 1.0% of the population were living below the poverty line, including 1.6% of those under age 18 and 0.0% of those age 65 or over. About 70.3% of the population were employed, and 59.0% had a bachelor's degree or higher.

=== 2000 census ===
At the 2000 census there were 3,907 people, 1,348 households, and 1,129 families living in the CDP. The population density was 3,522.6 inhabitants per square mile (1,360.1/km^{2}). There were 1,365 housing units at an average density of 1,230.7 per square mile (475.2/km^{2}). The racial makeup of the CDP was 96.54% White, 0.61% African American, 1.54% Asian, 0.03% Pacific Islander, 0.49% from other races, and 0.79% from two or more races. Hispanic or Latino of any race were 1.28%.

Of the 1,348 households 45.9% had children under the age of 18 living with them, 73.4% were married couples living together, 7.5% had a female householder with no husband present, and 16.2% were non-families. 14.1% of households were one person and 6.1% were one person aged 65 or older. The average household size was 2.90 and the average family size was 3.21.

The age distribution was 31.1% under the age of 18, 5.4% from 18 to 24, 27.9% from 25 to 44, 24.3% from 45 to 64, and 11.2% 65 or older. The median age was 37 years. For every 100 females, there were 94.9 males. For every 100 females age 18 and over, there were 93.4 males.

The median household income was $71,127 and the median family income was $77,816. Males had a median income of $53,393 versus $33,194 for females. The per capita income for the CDP was $27,965. About 0.5% of families and 1.5% of the population were below the poverty line, including 1.5% of those under age 18 and 1.9% of those age 65 or over.
