= Fruit Hill, Ohio =

- Census-designated place
- Location in Hamilton County and the state of Ohio.
- Coordinates: 39°04′07″N 84°21′23″W
- Country: United States
- State: Ohio
- County: Hamilton

Area
  - Total: 1.29 sq mi (3.33 km^{2})
  - Land: 1.29 sq mi (3.33 km^{2})
  - Water: 0 sq mi (0.00 km^{2})
- Elevation: 771 ft (235 m)

Population (2020)
  - Total: 3,748
  - Density: 2,917/sq mi (1,126.1/km^{2})
- Time zone: UTC-5 (Eastern (EST))
  - Summer (DST): UTC-4 (EDT)
- ZIP code: 45230
- Area codes: 283 and 513
- FIPS code: 39-28966
- GNIS feature ID: 2393014

Fruit Hill is a census-designated place (CDP) in Anderson Township, Hamilton County, Ohio, United States. The population was 3,748 at the 2020 census.

== Geography ==
According to the United States Census Bureau, the CDP has a total area of 1.3 square miles (3.3 km^{2}), all land.

== Demographics ==
Historical population
Census	Pop.	Note	%±
2020	3,748		—
U.S. Decennial Census

=== 2020 census ===
As of the 2020 census, Fruit Hill had a population of 3,748. The population density was 2,916.73 people per square mile (1,126.10/km^{2}).

The median age was 42.0 years. 24.0% of residents were under the age of 18 and 21.2% of residents were 65 years of age or older. For every 100 females there were 96.6 males, and for every 100 females age 18 and over there were 95.1 males age 18 and over. 100.0% of residents lived in urban areas, while 0.0% lived in rural areas.

There were 1,388 households in Fruit Hill, of which 32.9% had children under the age of 18 living in them. Of all households, 58.9% were married-couple households, 13.5% were households with a male householder and no spouse or partner present, and 21.8% were households with a female householder and no spouse or partner present. About 22.9% of all households were made up of individuals and 10.0% had someone living alone who was 65 years of age or older. The average household size was 2.80, and the average family size was 3.12.

There were 1,476 housing units, of which 6.0% were vacant. The homeowner vacancy rate was 0.5% and the rental vacancy rate was 24.6%.

Racial composition as of the 2020 census
Race	Number	Percent
White	3,377	90.1%
Black or African American	77	2.1%
American Indian and Alaska Native	5	0.1%
Asian	40	1.1%
Native Hawaiian and Other Pacific Islander	0	0.0%
Some other race	32	0.9%
Two or more races	217	5.8%
Hispanic or Latino (of any race)	102	2.7%

=== Income and poverty ===
According to the U.S. Census American Community Survey, for the period 2016-2020 the estimated median annual income for a household in the CDP was $84,877, and the median income for a family was $84,488. About 8.0% of the population were living below the poverty line, including 12.6% of those under age 18 and 1.3% of those age 65 or over. About 71.2% of the population were employed, and 54.5% had a bachelor's degree or higher.

=== 2000 census ===
At the 2000 census there were 3,945 people, 1,428 households, and 1,118 families living in the CDP. The population density was 3,153.2 inhabitants per square mile (1,217.5/km^{2}). There were 1,452 housing units at an average density of 1,160.6 per square mile (448.1/km^{2}). The racial makeup of the CDP was 97.49% White, 0.79% African American, 0.30% Native American, 1.06% Asian, 0.03% from other races, and 0.33% from two or more races. Hispanic or Latino of any race were 0.63%.

Of the 1,428 households 39.6% had children under the age of 18 living with them, 67.3% were married couples living together, 8.2% had a female householder with no husband present, and 21.7% were non-families. 19.5% of households were one person and 9.7% were one person aged 65 or older. The average household size was 2.68 and the average family size was 3.08.

The age distribution was 26.8% under the age of 18, 5.6% from 18 to 24, 27.9% from 25 to 44, 24.4% from 45 to 64, and 15.3% 65 or older. The median age was 39 years. For every 100 females, there were 92.5 males. For every 100 females age 18 and over, there were 85.4 males.

The median household income was $61,397 and the median family income was $68,676. Males had a median income of $45,306 versus $36,250 for females. The per capita income for the CDP was $28,145. About 2.5% of families and 2.5% of the population were below the poverty line, including 1.8% of those under age 18 and none of those age 65 or over.
