= Ohio-Kentucky-Indiana Regional Council of Governments =

Transportation planning organization for Cincinnati and is surrounding area

Metropolitan planning organization overview
- Formed: 1964
- Headquarters: 720 East Pete Rose Way, Suite 420, Cincinnati, Ohio, U.S.
- Website: www.oki.org

The Ohio-Kentucky-Indiana Regional Council of Governments (OKI) is a council of governments in the Cincinnati metropolitan area. It also serves as the region's federally mandated metropolitan planning organization, serving Butler, Clermont, Hamilton and Warren Counties in Ohio; Boone, Campbell and Kenton Counties in Kentucky; and Dearborn County in Indiana.

== Membership ==
OKI's Board of Directors contains 118 members, most of whom are elected officials. The Intermodal Coordinating Committee serves as the technical advisory committee to the Board of Directors.

== Work ==
OKI funds transportation projects such as widening highways, building highways, installing smart traffic signal upgrades and replacing buses.
