= Anderson High School (Ohio) =

Public school in Cincinnati, Ohio, US

Location
- 7560 Forest Road; Cincinnati, (Hamilton County), Ohio 45255; United States; 39°4′12″N 84°20′55″W

Information
- Type: Public, Coeducational high school
- Established: 1929
- School district: Forest Hills Local School District
- Superintendent: Suzanna Davis
- Principal: Kyle Fender
- Teaching staff: 73.87 (on an FTE basis)
- Grades: 9-12
- Enrollment: 1,177 (2023–2024) (2012-2013)
- Student to teacher ratio: 15.93
- Colors: Orange and Black
- Athletics conference: Eastern Cincinnati Conference
- Mascot: Raptors
- Nickname: Raptors
- Rival: Turpin High School
- Accreditation: North Central Association of Colleges and Schools
- Newspaper: Chieftain
- Yearbook: Andersonian
- Website: http://www.foresthills.edu/anderson

Anderson High School is a public high school in the Forest Hills Local School District in Hamilton County, Ohio.

== History ==
Established in 1929, Anderson High School is a high school in the Greater Cincinnati area. Anderson was a Blue Ribbon School from 1994 - 1996 as awarded by the United States Department of Education When founded, the school mascot was a comet, but the mascot was changed to Redskins prior to the 1936-37 school year.

In 2017, renovations began on the aging Anderson High School building. Construction is said to be done by the end of 2019.

== Mascot ==
In July 2020, the board of the Forest Hills Local School District voted 4-1 to retire the Redskins as Anderson High's mascot. The new mascot, Raptors was announced in March, 2021.

== Notable alumni ==
- Thom Brennaman, sportscaster
- Benjamin Cornwell, noted sociologist at Cornell University
- Richard Dotson, former MLB pitcher
- Brody Foley, college football tight end
- Jensen Lewis, former MLB pitcher
- Greg Mancz, NFL offensive lineman for the Houston Texans
- Andrew Norwell, NFL offensive lineman for the Washington Commanders
- Richard Oberacker, American composer, lyricist, conductor, and playwright
- Dave Wilson, Olympic swimmer

== Athletics ==
Anderson High School is a member of the OHSAA and participates in the Eastern Cincinnati Conference.

=== Ohio High School Athletic Association State Championships ===
- Football - 2007
