= Hahn Field Archeological District =

Archaeological site in Ohio, United States

- U.S. National Register of Historic Places
- U.S. Historic district
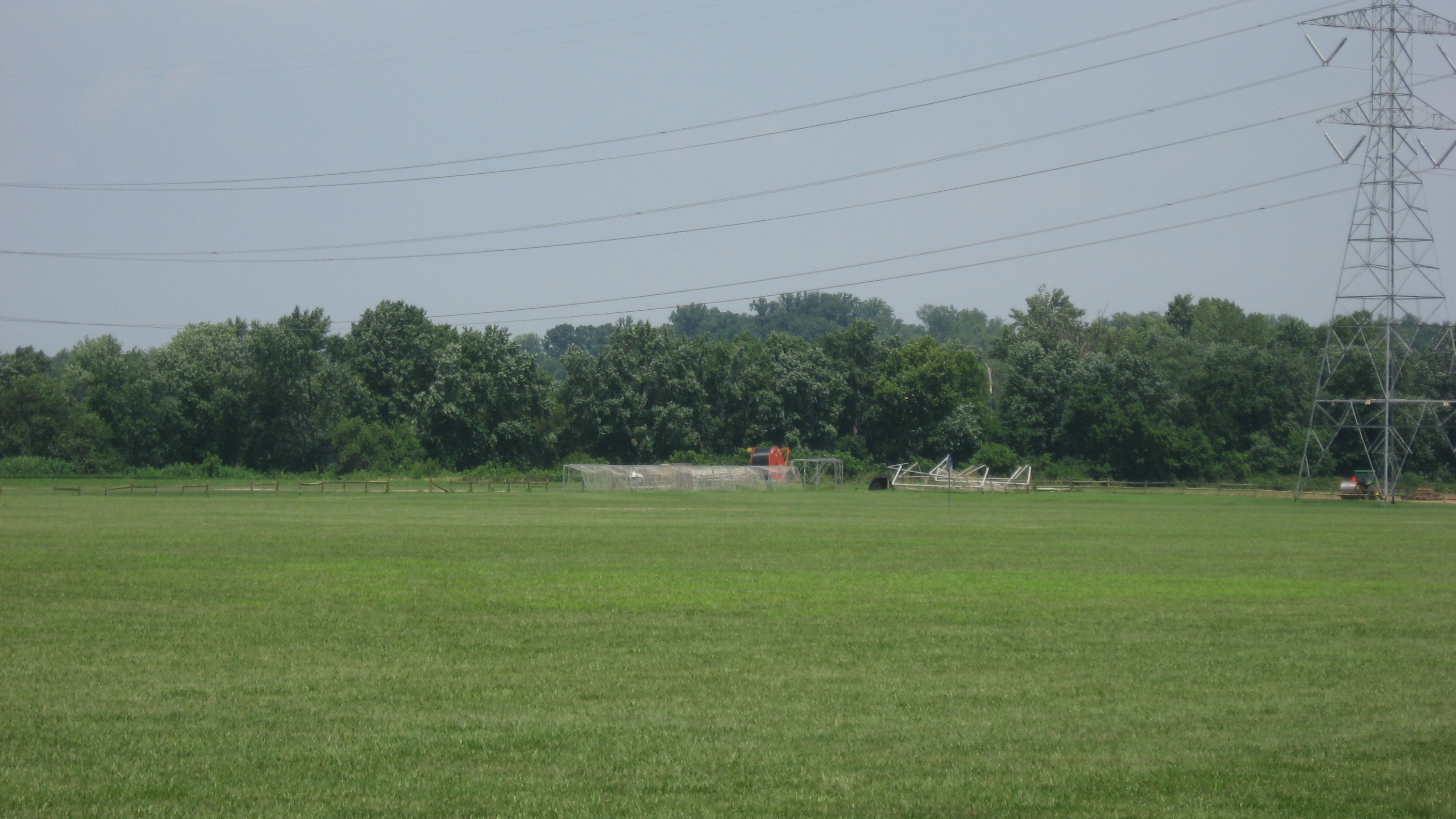
- Overview of the district
- Nearest city: Newtown, Ohio
- Area: 650 acres (260 ha)
- NRHP reference No.: 74001519
- Added to NRHP: October 29, 1974

Hahn Field Archeological District is a registered historic district near Newtown, Ohio, listed in the National Register of Historic Places on October 29, 1974.

== Historic uses ==
- Camp
- Graves/Burials
