= Odd Fellows' Cemetery Mound =

Archaeological site in Ohio, United States

- U.S. National Register of Historic Places
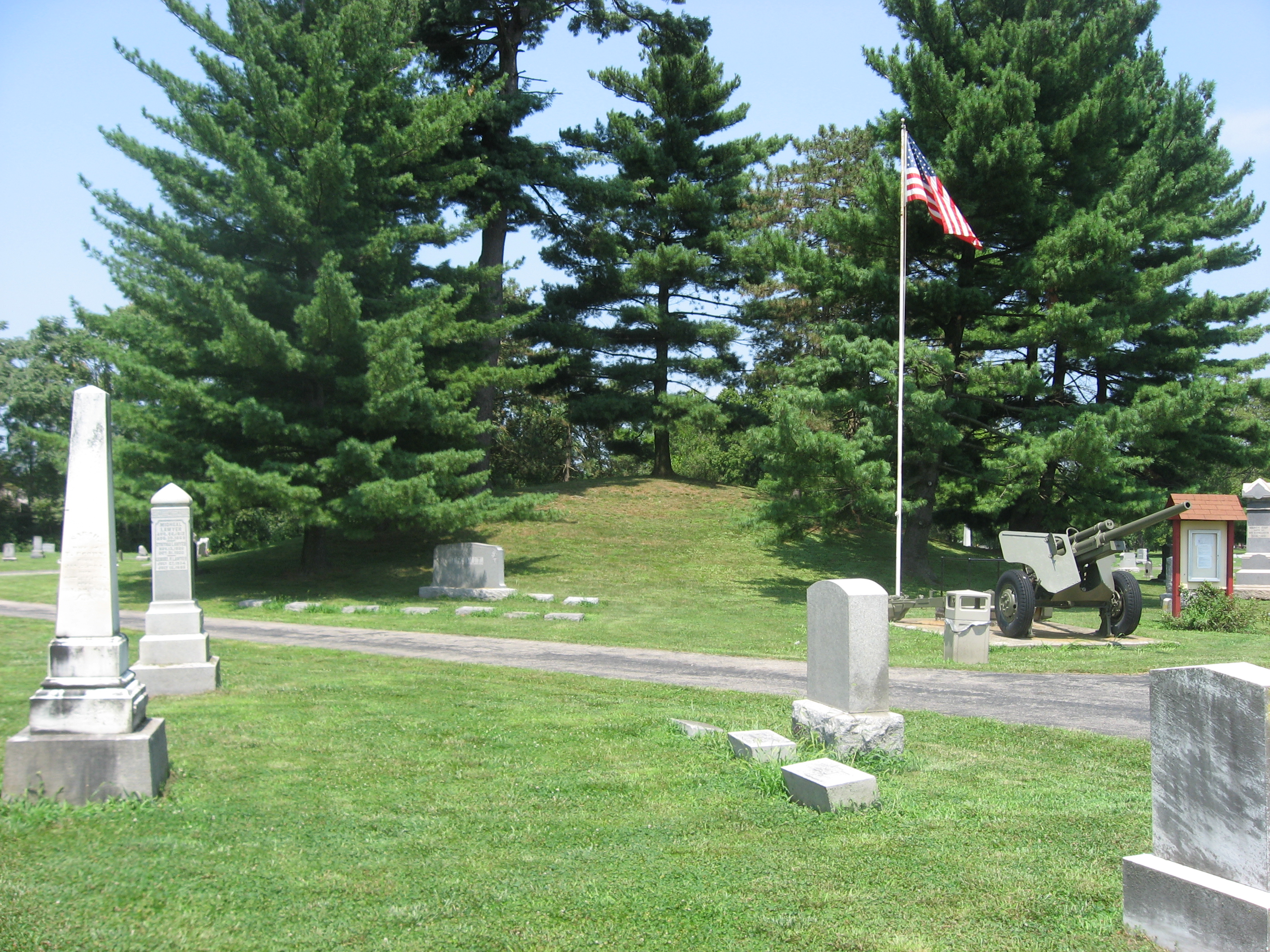
- Southern side of the mound

- Location within Ohio Location within the United States
- Location: Along Round Bottom Rd.
- Nearest city: Newtown, Ohio
- Coordinates: 39°7′38.1″N 84°21′20.5″W
- Area: 0.3 acres (0.12 ha)
- NRHP reference No.: 73001474
- Added to NRHP: June 18, 1973

The Odd Fellows' Cemetery Mound is a Native American mound in the southwestern part of the U.S. state of Ohio. Located in the village of Newtown in Hamilton County, the mound is an oval approximately 110 feet (34 m) long and 90 feet (27 m) wide; its height is 11.3 feet (3.4 m). It is believed to have been built by the Adena culture.

The mound is one of the few remnants of what was once a large complex of prehistoric earthworks and other archaeological sites. While multiple village sites are still in existence around Newtown, including the Perin Village Site just 0.3 miles (0.5 km) to the northwest, many of the earthworks have been destroyed. Because of its location in a cemetery, the Odd Fellows' Cemetery Mound has been spared destruction; although a few graves have been dug around the mound, there has been no significant damage done as a result. A smaller mound, known as the "Odd Fellows' Cemetery Mound 2," is located within the same cemetery; it is only a small fraction of the larger mound's size. This mound has been damaged by the digging of six graves into its side; however, no artifacts are known to have been found during the interment process.

For many years, the Odd Fellows' Cemetery Mound has been a landmark in the community. In 1943, a survey of Newtown performed by the Federal Writers' Project highlighted it and noted that it was "the only mound distinctly visible" in the vicinity of the village. Thirty years later, the mound was listed on the National Register of Historic Places because of its potential to become an archaeological site. Four years later, the nearby Perin Village Site was granted a similar status.

== See also ==
- Independent Order of Odd Fellows
