= Andrew Norwell =

American football player (born 1991)

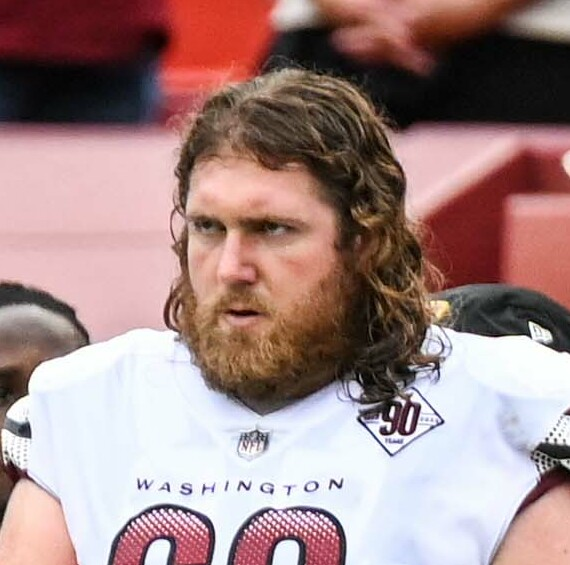
- Norwell with the Washington Commanders in 2022

No. 68
- Position: Guard

Personal information
- Born: October 25, 1991 (age 35); Cincinnati, Ohio, U.S.
- Listed height: 6 ft 6 in (1.98 m)
- Listed weight: 310 lb (141 kg)

Career information
- High school: Anderson (Cincinnati)
- College: Ohio State (2010–2013)
- NFL draft: 2014: undrafted

Career history
- Carolina Panthers (2014–2017); Jacksonville Jaguars (2018–2021); Washington Commanders (2022)

Awards and highlights
- First-team All-Pro (2017); 2× first-team All-Big Ten (2012, 2013)

Career NFL statistics
- Games played: 128
- Games started: 127
- Stats at Pro Football Reference

Andrew Norwell (born October 25, 1991) is an American former professional football player who was a guard in the National Football League (NFL). He played college football for the Ohio State Buckeyes and was signed as an undrafted free agent by the Carolina Panthers in 2014. Norwell has also played for the Jacksonville Jaguars and the Washington Commanders.

== Early life and college ==
College recruiting
Name	Hometown	School	Height	Weight	Commit date
Andrew Norwell; OT	Cincinnati, OH	Anderson High School	6 ft 7 in (2.01 m)	275 lb (125 kg)	Feb 3, 2010
Andrew Norwell; OT	Recruit ratings: Scout: Rivals: 247Sports: (80)				
Overall recruit ranking: Scout: 8 (overall), 2 (OT) Rivals: 59 (overall), 9 (OG), 5 (OH) ESPN: 13 (OT)
Note: In many cases, Scout, Rivals, 247Sports, On3, and ESPN may conflict in their listings of height and weight.; In these cases, the average was taken. ESPN grades are on a 100-point scale.; Sources: "2010 Ohio State Football Commitments". Rivals.; "2010 Ohio State Football Recruiting Commits". Scout.; "ESPN". ESPN.; "Scout.com Team Recruiting Rankings". Scout.; "2010 Team Ranking". Rivals.com.

Norwell attended Anderson High School in Cincinnati, Ohio. He played college football at Ohio State University from 2010 to 2013. He started 39 of 50 games. During his true freshman year, Norwell was the primary backup at right tackle in 2010 and played in 11 games. He named to a Big Ten all-freshman team by Rivals.com. During his sophomore year, Norwell started 13 games and started at both the left guard and left tackle positions. He was named honorable mention all-Big Ten. During his junior season, Norwell played more downs than any player on offense with 862. The Ohio State coaches named him co-offensive lineman of the year. He helped Ohio State average 242.2 yards per game rushing, ranking 10th nationally in 2012, lead the Big Ten in scoring at 37.1 points per game, and was named first-team all-Big Ten. Norwell was named to the first-team all-Big Ten Conference for the second consecutive season. He graduated in May 2014 with a degree in communications.

== Professional career ==
=== Carolina Panthers ===
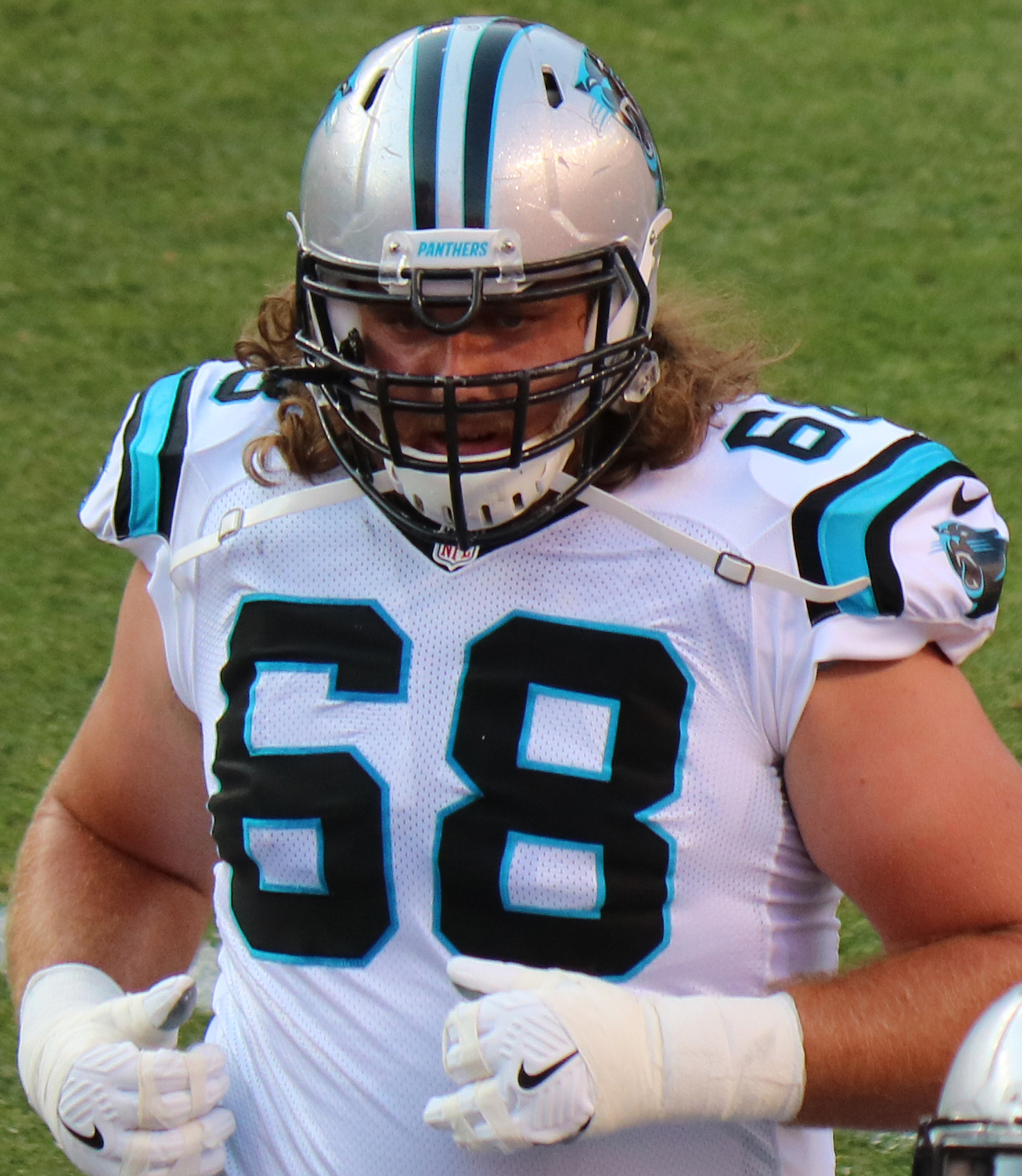
Norwell with the Panthers in 2016

Pre-draft measurables
Height	Weight	Arm length	Hand span	40-yard dash	10-yard split	20-yard split	20-yard shuttle	Three-cone drill	Vertical jump	Broad jump	Bench press
6 ft 5 3/4 in (1.97 m)	315 lb (143 kg)	33 5/8 in (0.85 m)	9 7/8 in (0.25 m)	5.28 s	1.91 s	3.08 s	4.93 s	8.09 s	28.0 in (0.71 m)	8 ft 9 in (2.67 m)	22 reps
All values from Ohio State Pro Day

Despite his decorated college career, Norwell went undrafted in the 2014 NFL draft and signed with the Carolina Panthers as a free agent. Norwell signed a three-year, $1.5 million contract on May 12, 2014.

Norwell was inserted into the starting lineup in Week 7. Following Week 10, Pro Football Focus rated Norwell as the ninth best guard in the NFL, ahead of two other high-profile rookie guards, Zack Martin and Joel Bitonio. His insertion into the starting lineup at left guard helped stabilize the offensive line, and over his last six games at left guard, Pro Football Focus rated Norwell as the fourth-best left guard in the NFL. His emergence into the starting lineup helped the Panthers rank seventh in the NFL in rushing, including a league-leading 975 yards over the last five games. He also helped the Panthers to back-to-back division titles for the first time since the formation of the NFC South division. Norwell was also among the least penalized players at the position and through the entire season, did not allow a single sack and only one quarterback hit.

Through the first three games of the 2015 season, Norwell allowed only two quarterback pressures and one sack. Norwell was part of the Panthers team that played in Super Bowl 50. On March 7, 2017, the Panthers placed a second-round tender on Norwell, who was set to be a restricted free agent. On April 17, 2017, Norwell officially signed his tender with the Panthers. Norwell started all 16 games at left guard, on his way to being named first-team All-Pro. He was also ranked as the third best guard in the league according to Pro Football Focus.

=== Jacksonville Jaguars ===
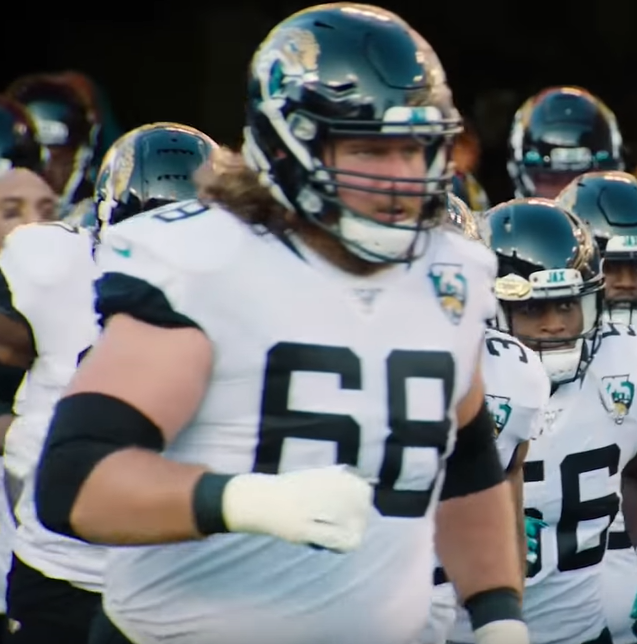
Norwell with the Jacksonville Jaguars in 2019

On March 15, 2018, Norwell signed a five-year, $66.5 million contract with the Jacksonville Jaguars with $30 million guaranteed, which at the time made him the highest-paid guard in the league. He started the first 11 games at left guard before suffering an ankle injury in Week 12. He was placed on injured reserve on November 26, 2018.

On November 28, 2020, Norwell was placed on injured reserve after suffering a forearm injury in Week 11. On December 19, 2020, he was activated off of injured reserve. In March 2021, Norwell agreed to a contract restructuring that resulted in a pay cut and shortening the remainder of his contract to one year.

=== Washington Commanders ===
Norwell signed a two-year contract with Washington Commanders on March 17, 2022. He was named the starting left guard in 2022, starting 16 games.

Norwell was placed on the physically unable to perform (PUP) list on May 30, 2023, due to an elbow injury, and was released on July 24, 2023.

== Personal life ==
Norwell's older brother, Chris, is the head football coach at Thomas More University.
