= Sherwood Anderson Park =

Park in Ohio, United States

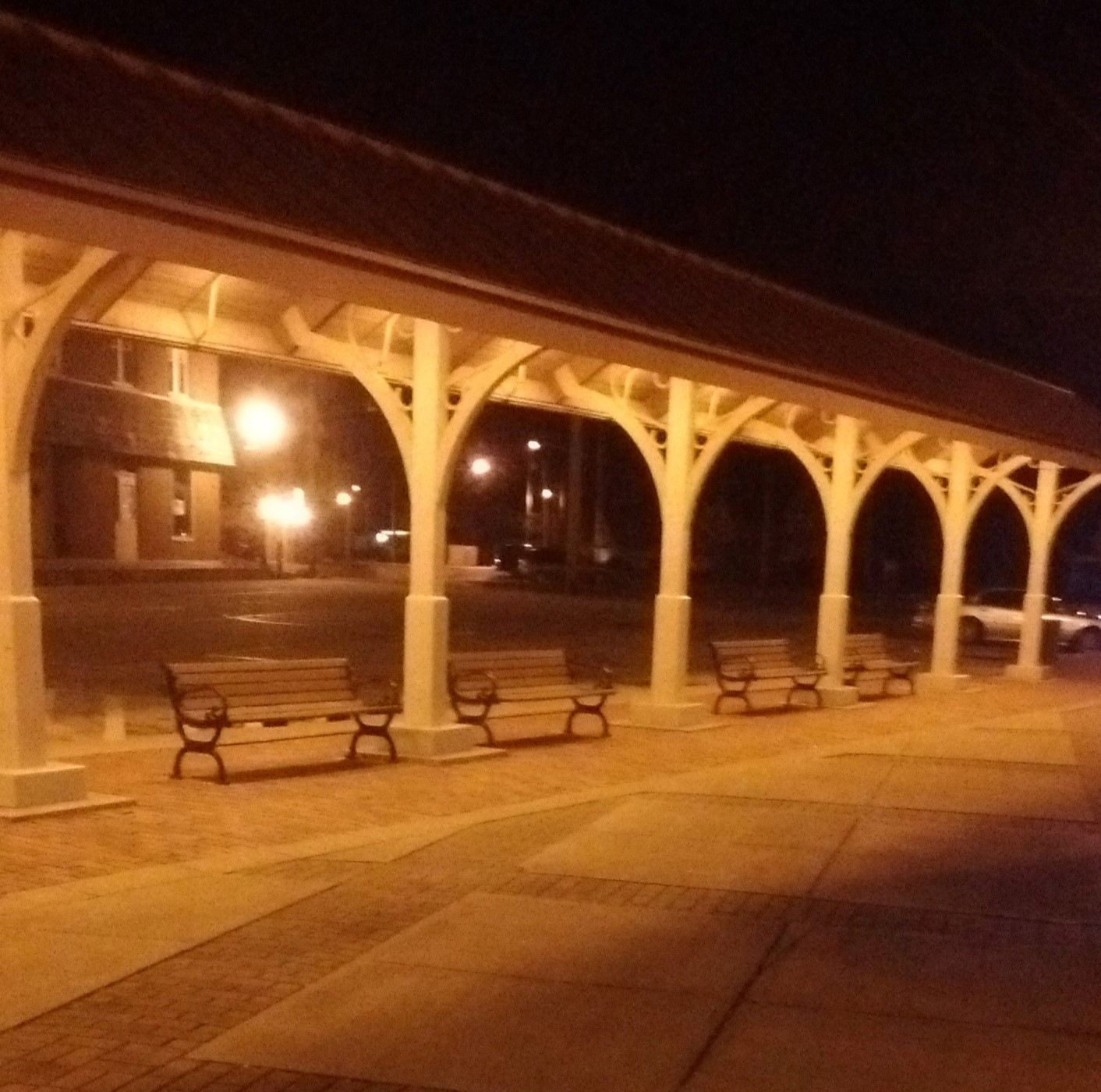
- Interactive map of Sherwood Anderson Park
- Type: Public
- Location: Clyde, Ohio 43410, United States
- Coordinates: 41°18′21″N 82°58′30″W
- Created: 1976

Sherwood Anderson Park (sometimes referred to unofficially as Sherwood Anderson Plaza) is a public park located in Clyde, Ohio, United States that was named after the American short story writer and author Sherwood Anderson. Anderson is well known in Clyde for writing the 1919 short story collection Winesburg, Ohio, which is based loosely on his experiences in Clyde.

Sherwood Anderson Park is located in the center of Clyde's downtown area, where the bike trail known as the North Coast Inland Trail passes through the city. The park features a fountain and a row of sheltered benches in the town plaza as well as a gazebo outside of the plaza.

== History ==
Sherwood Anderson Park was founded in 1976 by the Clyde Heritage League, but the area laid out for the park was reserved by Penn Central Transportation Company, so the park was eventually shut down. On July 7, 2015, the City of Clyde passed a resolution that supported the Sherwood Anderson Society's reestablishment of the park. On May 1, 2018, Clyde City Council members unanimously voted to rescind Resolution 2015–32 and withdraw its support of the Sherwood Anderson Society.

A 1976 article of the Toledo-based newspaper Toledo Blade stated that even the former Sherwood Anderson Park "[featured] park benches and trees in the center of the business district." A 1984 article of the daily newspaper The Cincinnati Enquirer also claimed that "Anderson's widow, Eleanor, came to town and stood by proudly as the sign proclaiming Sherwood Anderson Park was put into place."

== Funding ==
The park is funded by the Whirlpool Corporation Clyde Division and the local government of the City of Clyde.
