= Newtown, Ohio =

- Village
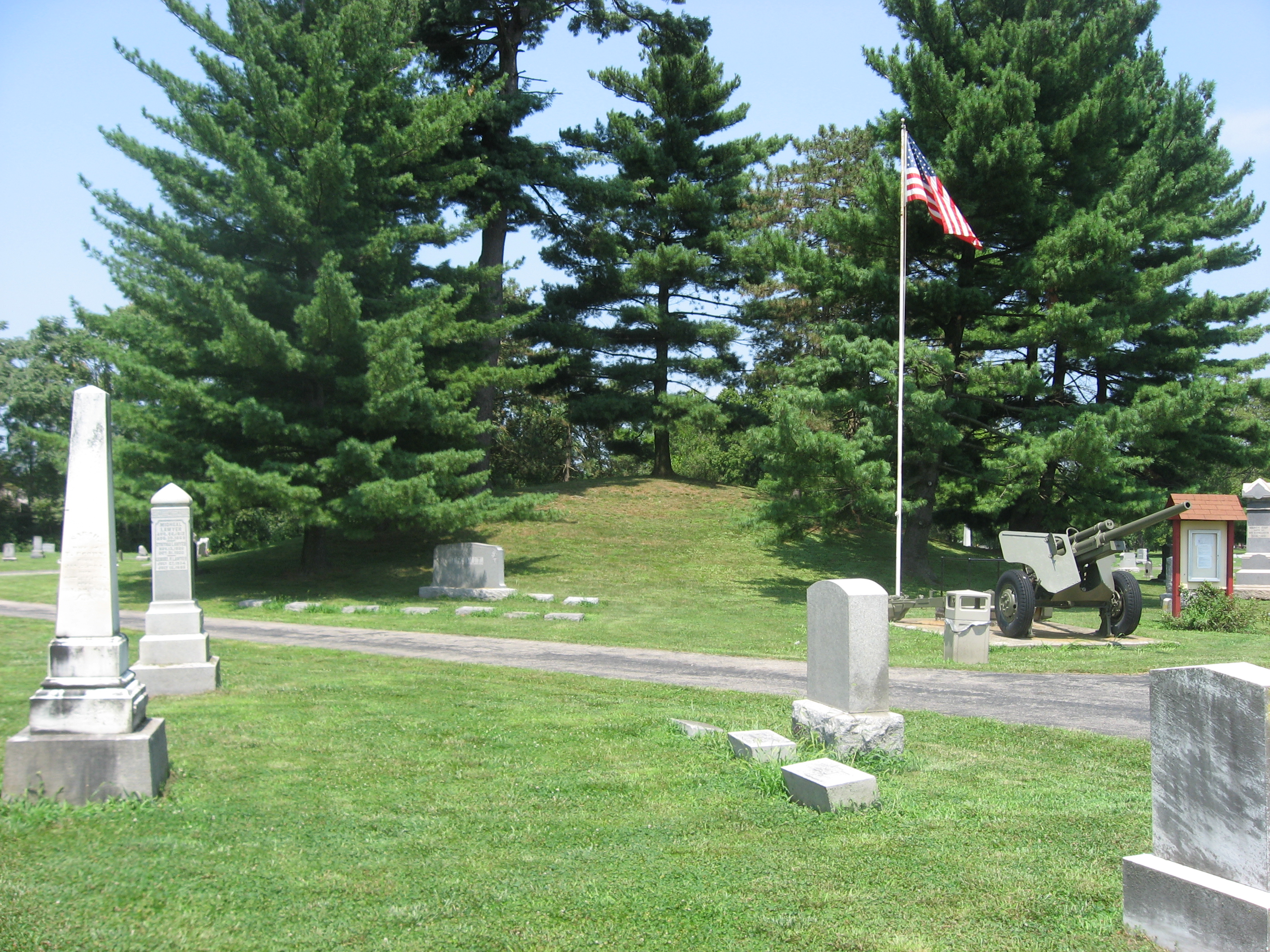
- Native American mound in a Newtown cemetery

- Location in Hamilton County and the state of Ohio
- Coordinates: 39°07′35″N 84°21′07″W
- Country: United States
- State: Ohio
- County: Hamilton

Government
  - Mayor: Terry Fairely

Area
  - Total: 2.22 sq mi (5.76 km^{2})
  - Land: 2.07 sq mi (5.35 km^{2})
  - Water: 0.16 sq mi (0.41 km^{2})
- Elevation: 512 ft (156 m)

Population (2020)
  - Total: 2,702
  - Density: 1,307.0/sq mi (504.62/km^{2})
- Time zone: UTC-5 (Eastern (EST))
  - Summer (DST): UTC-4 (EDT)
- ZIP code: 45244
- Area code: 513
- FIPS code: 39-55678
- GNIS feature ID: 1086222
- Website: www.newtownohio.gov

Newtown is a village in southeastern Hamilton County, Ohio, United States, near Cincinnati. The population was 2,702 at the 2020 census. Newtown was settled in 1792 and incorporated as a village in 1901.

== History ==
Multiple Native American mounds and other earthworks were once located on the site of Newtown.

Newtown was first settled in 1792 under the name of Mercersburg. The name was changed before the village incorporated in 1901. Still in existence today are the Odd Fellows' Cemetery Mound and the Perin Village Site, plus the Turpin site and the Hahn Field Archeological District just outside the village's boundaries.

Newtown withdrew from Anderson Township in the 1960s by forming a paper township.

== Geography ==
Newtown is surrounded by Anderson Township, from which it was split in the 1960s.

According to the United States Census Bureau, the village has a total area of 2.37 square miles (6.14 km^{2}), of which 2.17 square miles (5.62 km^{2}) is land and 0.20 square miles (0.52 km^{2}) is water.

== Demographics ==
Historical population
Census	Pop.	Note	%±
1880	424		—
1890	552		30.2%
1910	546		—
1920	534		−2.2%
1930	939		75.8%
1940	1,146		22.0%
1950	1,462		27.6%
1960	1,750		19.7%
1970	2,038		16.5%
1980	1,817		−10.8%
1990	1,589		−12.5%
2000	2,420		52.3%
2010	2,672		10.4%
2020	2,702		1.1%
U.S. Decennial Census

=== 2020 census ===
As of the census of 2020, there were 2,702 people living in the village, for a population density of 1,307.21 people per square mile (504.62/km^{2}). There were 1,207 housing units. The racial makeup of the village was 88.1% White, 3.0% Black or African American, 0.1% Native American, 2.6% Asian, 0.0% Pacific Islander, 1.0% from some other race, and 5.2% from two or more races. 3.0% of the population were Hispanic or Latino of any race.

There were 1,107 households, out of which 32.5% had children under the age of 18 living with them, 56.2% were married couples living together, 12.5% had a male householder with no spouse present, and 25.6% had a female householder with no spouse present. 24.1% of all households were made up of individuals, and 9.4% were someone living alone who was 65 years of age or older. The average household size was 2.42, and the average family size was 2.86.

25.8% of the village's population were under the age of 18, 51.9% were 18 to 64, and 22.3% were 65 years of age or older. The median age was 40.9. For every 100 females, there were 90.4 males.

According to the U.S. Census American Community Survey, for the period 2016-2020 the estimated median annual income for a household in the village was $84,148, and the median income for a family was $87,143. About 5.0% of the population were living below the poverty line, including 7.3% of those under age 18 and 7.4% of those age 65 or over. About 64.0% of the population were employed, and 55.8% had a bachelor's degree or higher.

=== 2010 census ===
As of the census of 2010, there were 2,672 people, 1,123 households, and 724 families living in the village. The population density was 1,231.3 inhabitants per square mile (475.4/km^{2}). There were 1,227 housing units at an average density of 565.4 per square mile (218.3/km^{2}). The racial makeup of the village was 94.6% White, 1.4% African American, 0.2% Native American, 1.6% Asian, 0.8% from other races, and 1.4% from two or more races. Hispanic or Latino of any race were 2.1% of the population.

There were 1,123 households, of which 31.8% had children under the age of 18 living with them, 49.2% were married couples living together, 10.9% had a female householder with no husband present, 4.5% had a male householder with no wife present, and 35.5% were non-families. 29.1% of all households were made up of individuals, and 8.4% had someone living alone who was 65 years of age or older. The average household size was 2.38 and the average family size was 2.96.

The median age in the village was 39 years. 24.5% of residents were under the age of 18; 6% were between the ages of 18 and 24; 27.5% were from 25 to 44; 29.4% were from 45 to 64; and 12.5% were 65 years of age or older. The gender makeup of the village was 48.2% male and 51.8% female.

=== 2000 census ===
As of the census of 2000, there were 2,420 people, 924 households, and 669 families living in the village. The population density was 1,042.4 inhabitants per square mile (402.5/km^{2}). There were 977 housing units at an average density of 420.8 per square mile (162.5/km^{2}). The racial makeup of the village was 96.36% White, 1.86% African American, 0.41% Native American, 0.87% Asian, 0.12% from other races, and 0.37% from two or more races. Hispanic or Latino of any race were 1.16% of the population.

There were 924 households, out of which 35.7% had children under the age of 18 living with them, 58.9% were married couples living together, 10.1% had a female householder with no husband present, and 27.5% were non-families. 23.1% of all households were made up of individuals, and 7.6% had someone living alone who was 65 years of age or older. The average household size was 2.62 and the average family size was 3.11.

In the village, the population was spread out, with 27.1% under the age of 18, 6.8% from 18 to 24, 32.1% from 25 to 44, 24.7% from 45 to 64, and 9.3% who were 65 years of age or older. The median age was 36 years. For every 100 females there were 94.7 males. For every 100 females age 18 and over, there were 93.7 males.

The median income for a household in the village was $50,980, and the median income for a family was $56,902. Males had a median income of $41,976 versus $28,810 for females. The per capita income for the village was $32,590. About 4.9% of families and 7.1% of the population were below the poverty line, including 8.3% of those under age 18 and 12.5% of those age 65 or over.

== Culture ==
Newtown has a decades-long tradition of hosting an open-to-the-public fish fry every Friday during Lent. Originally run solely by the local volunteer fire department, it has become an event staffed by volunteers from throughout the community. In addition Newtown also holds an annual Winterfest celebration in December.
