= Louis Sawyer House =

Historic house in Ohio, United States

- U.S. National Register of Historic Places
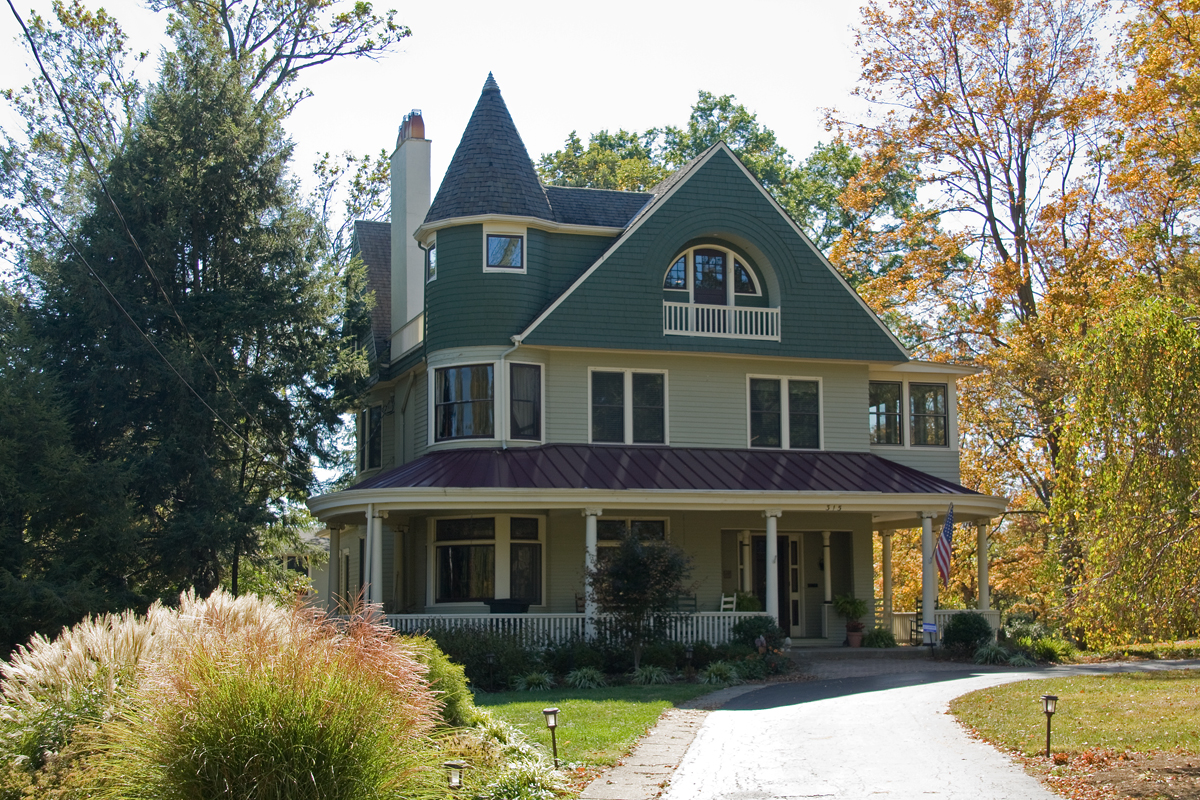
- Front of the house

- Location within Ohio Location within the United States
- Location: 315 Reily Rd., Wyoming, Ohio
- Coordinates: 39°13′44″N 84°28′46″W
- Area: 0.6 acres (0.24 ha)
- Built: 1900
- Architectural style: Queen Anne, Shingle style
- MPS: Wyoming MRA
- NRHP reference No.: 86001645
- Added to NRHP: August 25, 1986

The Louis Sawyer House is a historic residence in the city of Wyoming, Ohio, United States. Erected at the turn of the twentieth century, it was originally the home of an important lawyer, and it has been designated a historic site because of its architecture.

== Architecture ==
Three stories tall, the Sawyer House consists of shingled walls built on a stone foundation and covered with an asphalt roof. Among its features is a tower on one corner; it extends through all three stories, and it is topped with a steep roof rising to a point. Numerous shuttered windows occupy much of the wall area, including some window space in the front gable. The main entrance is located on the right side of the facade, across from the tower; deeply recessed, it is framed with sidelights and a pair of columns. Extending across the entire facade, including the base of the tower, is a veranda-style porch with Ionic columns. All of these features combine to make it one of metro Cincinnati's best examples of the Shingle variant of the Queen Anne style of architecture. Virtually no changes have been made to the house's exterior since it was built, making it an exceptionally well preserved example of the style. Another such house, the Josiah Kirby House, is located in the same Wyoming neighborhood, but its substantially larger size makes it a mansion, unlike the smaller Sawyer House.

== Historic context ==
Good transportation is a leading reason for Wyoming's prosperity. The city lies near the old pre-statehood road that connected Cincinnati with locations farther north, such as Fort Hamilton and Fallen Timbers. Curves in the road were cut off in 1806, forming a new road that is today followed by Springfield Pike through central Wyoming. Improvements in the 1830s only enhanced its importance. By this time, another mode of transportation had become significant: the Miami and Erie Canal was built a short distance to the east in 1828, and the village of Lockland grew up along its side. Railroads reached the city in 1851 with the construction of the Cincinnati, Hamilton, and Dayton Railroad on the border between Lockland and Wyoming.

Because of Wyoming's proximity to the industry of Lockland, its easy transportation to the booming city of Cincinnati, and its pleasant scenery, many wealthy industrialists purchased local farms and built grand country houses. Most such houses were built in the Wyoming Hills area, west of Springfield Pike; growth in this area continued until the coming of the Great Depression. Although not a businessman, Louis Sawyer was still a prominent Hamilton County citizen; an attorney, he took office as one of the county's assistant prosecutors upon moving to Wyoming in 1900. His house was built in the same year.

== Historic site ==
In 1979, a local historic preservation group began a citywide survey to identify Wyoming's historic buildings, and this effort culminated with a multiple property submission of eighteen houses, the Wyoming Presbyterian Church, and one historic district to the National Register of Historic Places in 1985. Along with all but one of the other properties, the Sawyer House was listed on the Register in the following year, qualifying because of its historically significant architecture. It is one of five Reily Road houses included in this group, along with the Charles Fay House, the Luethstrom-Hurin House, the John C. Pollock House, and the William Stearns House.
