= Charles Fay House =

Historic house in Ohio, United States

- U.S. National Register of Historic Places
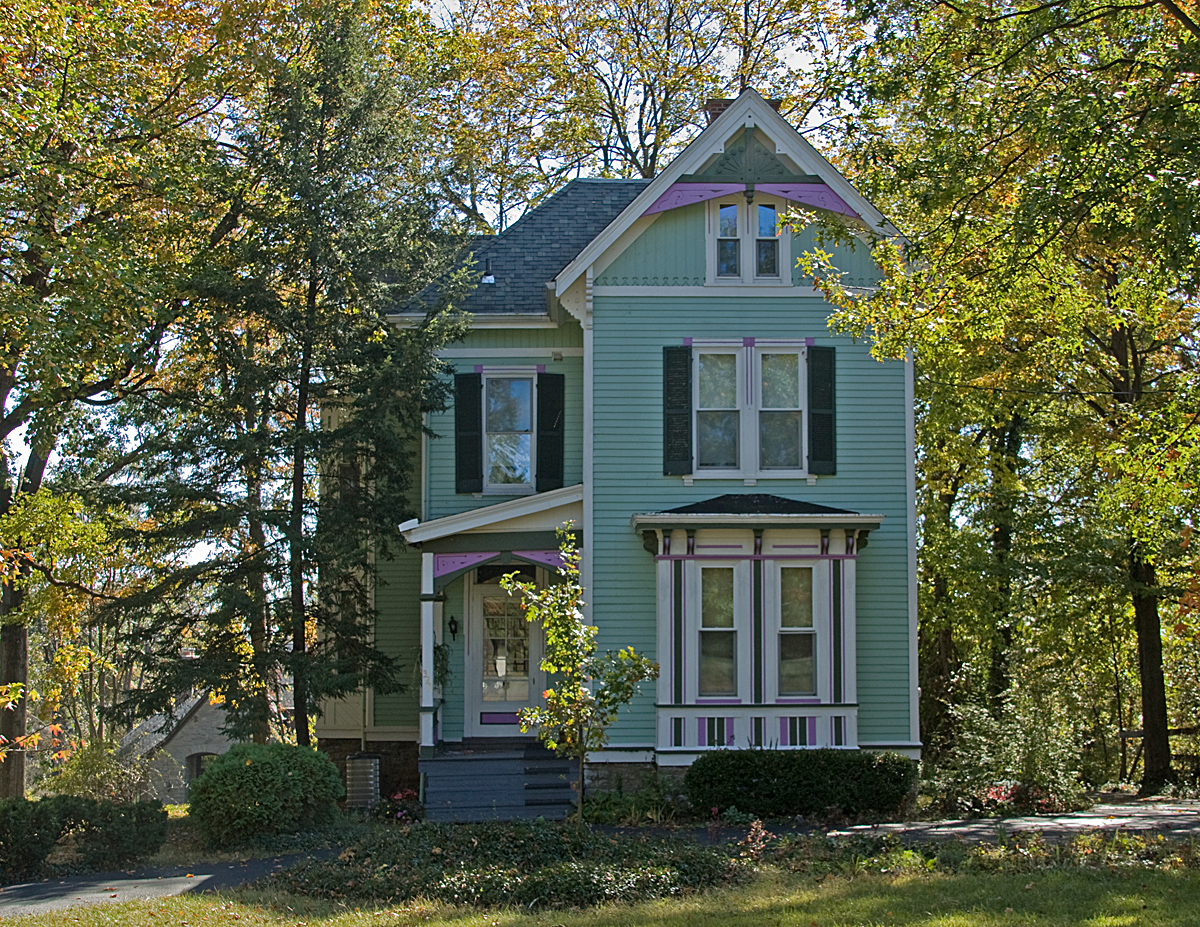
- Front of the house

- Location within Ohio Location within the United States
- Location: 325 Reily Rd., Wyoming, Ohio
- Coordinates: 39°13′44″N 84°28′47″W
- Area: 0.6 acres (0.24 ha)
- Built: 1875
- Architectural style: Stick-Eastlake
- MPS: Wyoming MRA
- NRHP reference No.: 86001630
- Added to NRHP: August 25, 1986

The Charles Fay House is a historic residence in the city of Wyoming, Ohio, United States. Erected in the late nineteenth century, it was originally the home of one of the city's leading educators, and it has been designated a historic site because of its distinctive architecture.

== Architecture ==
Designed in the Stick-Eastlake style and built of wood on a stone foundation, the Fay House is one of Wyoming's best Victorian residences from an architectural point of view. Among its most distinctive features is its roofline: it is primarily covered with a hip roof, there are three different gabled sections, one of which is composed of two corbelled chimneys. Exquisite "gingerbread" carvings decorate the many bargeboards, while most of the rest of the house is covered with simple wooden weatherboarding. The house has been expanded since its 1875 construction: two small bays (one on the eastern side, and one on the front) were seemingly added in the 1890s, and a small front porch and a small rear shed were also attached to the house after its completion.

== Historic Context ==
Good transportation is a leading reason for Wyoming's prosperity. The city lies near the old pre-statehood road that connected Cincinnati with locations farther north, such as Fort Hamilton and Fallen Timbers. Curves in the road were cut off in 1806, forming a new road that is today followed by Springfield Pike through central Wyoming. Improvements in the 1830s only enhanced its importance. By this time, another mode of transportation had become significant: the Miami and Erie Canal was built a short distance to the east in 1828, and the village of Lockland grew up along its side. Railroads reached the city in 1851 with the construction of the Cincinnati, Hamilton, and Dayton Railroad on the border between Lockland and Wyoming.

Because of Wyoming's proximity to the industry of Lockland, its easy transportation to the booming city of Cincinnati, and its pleasant scenery, many wealthy industrialists purchased local farms and built grand country houses. Most such houses were built in the Wyoming Hills area, west of Springfield Pike; growth in this area continued until the coming of the Great Depression. Charles Fay was himself not a businessman; when Wyoming established a school system in 1882, he was appointed the principal, and he remained in this office until 1922.

== Historic Site ==
In 1979, a local historic preservation group began a citywide survey to identify Wyoming's historic buildings, and this effort culminated with a multiple property submission of eighteen houses, the Wyoming Presbyterian Church, and one historic district to the National Register of Historic Places in 1985. Along with all but one of the other properties, the Fay House was listed on the Register in the following year, qualifying because of its historically significant architecture. It is one of five Reily Road houses included in this group, along with the Luethstrom-Hurin House, the John C. Pollock House, the Louis Sawyer House, and the William Stearns House.
