= John C. Pollock House =

Historic house in Ohio, United States

- U.S. National Register of Historic Places
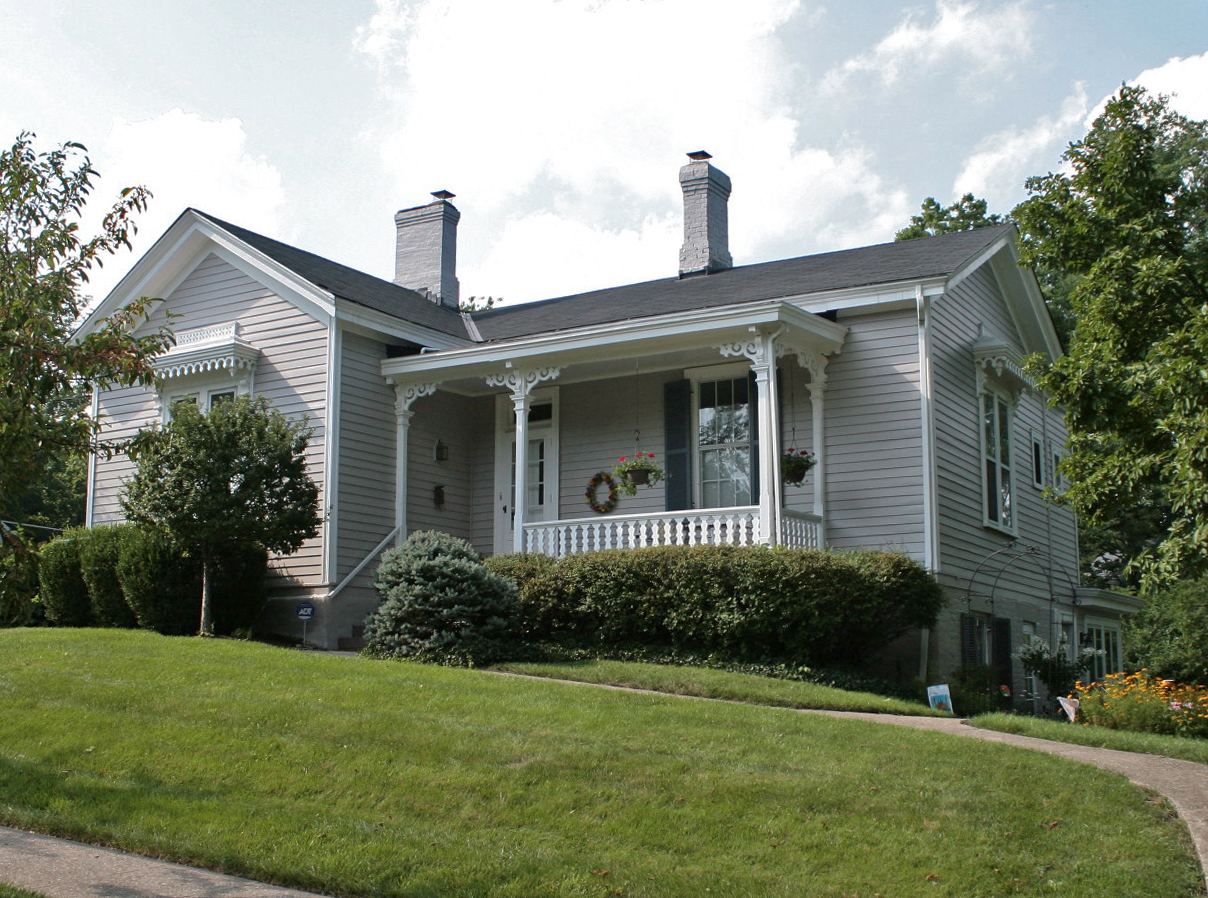
- Front of the house

- Location within Ohio Location within the United States
- Location: 88 Reily Rd., Wyoming, Ohio
- Coordinates: 39°13′43″N 84°28′34″W
- Area: 1 acre (0.40 ha)
- Built: 1870
- Architectural style: Italianate
- MPS: Wyoming MRA
- NRHP reference No.: 86001639
- Added to NRHP: August 25, 1986

The John C. Pollock House is a historic residence in the city of Wyoming, Ohio, United States. Erected in the 1870s, it was originally the home of a prosperous businessman, and it has been designated a historic site because of its architecture.

== Architecture ==
One story tall and equipped with a walk-out basement, the Pollock House is a weatherboarded structure with a stone foundation, a metal roof, and other elements of wood. Hoods are placed over the windows, and a small porch shelters the main entrance. One of the area's best Italianate cottages, the house's general plan features an ell, which the main entrance faces and into which the porch is placed. Some of the house's most elaborate features appear on the porch, including its delicate balustrade, the transom window over the front door, and chamfered pillars. Placed at different parts of the exterior are wide eaves with cornice, while the window hoods feature "gingerbread" carven brackets and decorative bargeboards. Combined with other lesser features, these elements produce the appearance of a master-designed house on a small scale.

== Historic context ==
Good transportation is a leading reason for Wyoming's prosperity. The city lies near the old pre-statehood road that connected Cincinnati with locations farther north, such as Fort Hamilton and Fallen Timbers. Curves in the road were cut off in 1806, forming a new road that is today followed by Springfield Pike through central Wyoming. Improvements in the 1830s only enhanced its importance. By this time, another mode of transportation had become significant: the Miami and Erie Canal was built a short distance to the east in 1828, and the village of Lockland grew up along its side. Railroads reached the city in 1851 with the construction of the Cincinnati, Hamilton, and Dayton Railroad on the border between Lockland and Wyoming.

Because of Wyoming's proximity to the industry of Lockland, its easy transportation to the booming city of Cincinnati, and its pleasant scenery, many wealthy industrialists purchased local farms and built grand country houses. Most such houses were built in the Wyoming Hills area, west of Springfield Pike; growth in this area continued until the coming of the Great Depression. John C. Pollock was among the businessmen building these houses; he was one of the partners in a Cincinnati insurance firm, Pollock and Whittlesey.

== Historic site ==
In 1979, a local historic preservation group began a citywide survey to identify Wyoming's historic buildings, and this effort culminated with a multiple property submission of eighteen houses, the Wyoming Presbyterian Church, and one historic district to the National Register of Historic Places in 1985. Along with all but one of the other properties, the Pollock House was listed on the Register in the following year, qualifying because of its historically significant architecture. It is one of five Reily Road houses included in this group, along with the Charles Fay House, the Luethstrom-Hurin House, the Louis Sawyer House, and the William Stearns House.
