= Luethstrom–Hurin House =

- U.S. National Register of Historic Places
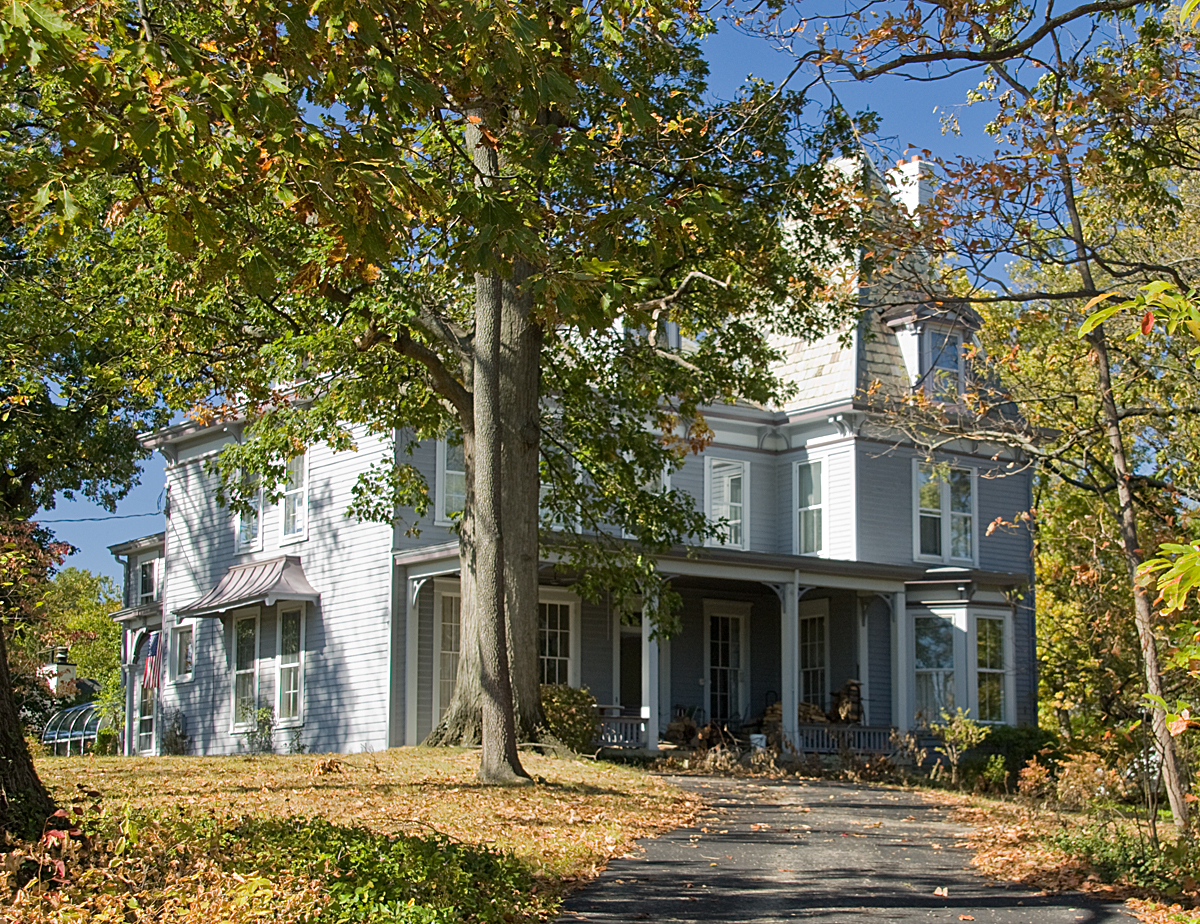
- Front, seen from Reily Road

- Location within Ohio Location within the United States
- Location: 30 Reily Rd., Wyoming, Ohio
- Coordinates: 39°13′42″N 84°28′25″W
- Area: 1.2 acres (0.49 ha)
- Built: 1865
- Architectural style: Second Empire, Italianate
- MPS: Wyoming MRA
- NRHP reference No.: 86001635
- Added to NRHP: August 25, 1986

The Luethstrom–Hurin House is a historic residence in the city of Wyoming, Ohio, United States. Erected in the 1860s and profoundly modified before 1875, it was the home of two prominent businessmen in the local grain and flour industry, and it has been designated a historic site because of its architecture.

== Architecture ==
The Luethstrom–Hurin House is a weatherboarded structure with a stone foundation and slate roof. When constructed in 1865, the house was a simple Italianate building with a five-bay facade. It only retained this form for a few years; by 1875, it had been expanded to the rear, and 1885 modifications introduced a Second Empire elements such as the tower and dormer-pierced roof. The tower protrudes from one side of the two-story facade (on the right as one views the house from a distance), while a bay window protrudes farther from the tower, and a single-story porch shelters the entrance and the remaining parts of the facade. Bracketing supports the overhanging cornice above the second-story windows.

== Historic context ==
Good transportation is a leading reason for Wyoming's prosperity. The city lies near the old pre-statehood road that connected Cincinnati with locations farther north, such as Fort Hamilton and Fallen Timbers. Curves in the road were cut off in 1806, forming a new road that is today followed by Springfield Pike through central Wyoming. Improvements in the 1830s only enhanced its importance. By this time, another mode of transportation had become significant: the Miami and Erie Canal was built a short distance to the east in 1828, and the village of Lockland grew up along its side. Railroads reached the city in 1851 with the construction of the Cincinnati, Hamilton, and Dayton Railroad on the border between Lockland and Wyoming.

Because of Wyoming's proximity to the industry of Lockland, its easy transportation to the booming city of Cincinnati, and its pleasant scenery, many wealthy industrialists purchased local farms and built grand country houses. Most such houses were built in the Wyoming Hills area, west of Springfield Pike; growth in this area continued until the coming of the Great Depression. The original owner of the house, a Mr. Luethstrom, was a typical city resident; he was a partner in the firm of Luethstrom and Russell, which sold grain and flour. The second resident, James Hurin, arrived with his family in 1874. As the president of Cincinnati's West End Flour Mills, he was involved in the same business as Luethstrom.

== Historic site ==
In 1979, a local historic preservation group began a citywide survey to identify Wyoming's historic buildings, and this effort culminated with a multiple property submission of eighteen houses, the Wyoming Presbyterian Church, and one historic district to the National Register of Historic Places in 1985. Along with all but one of the other properties, the Luethstrom–Hurin House was listed on the Register in the following year, qualifying because of its historically significant architecture. It is one of five Reily Road houses included in this group, along with the Charles Fay House, the John C. Pollock House, the Louis Sawyer House, and the William Stearns House.
