= Edward R. Stearns House =

Historic house in Ohio, United States

- U.S. National Register of Historic Places
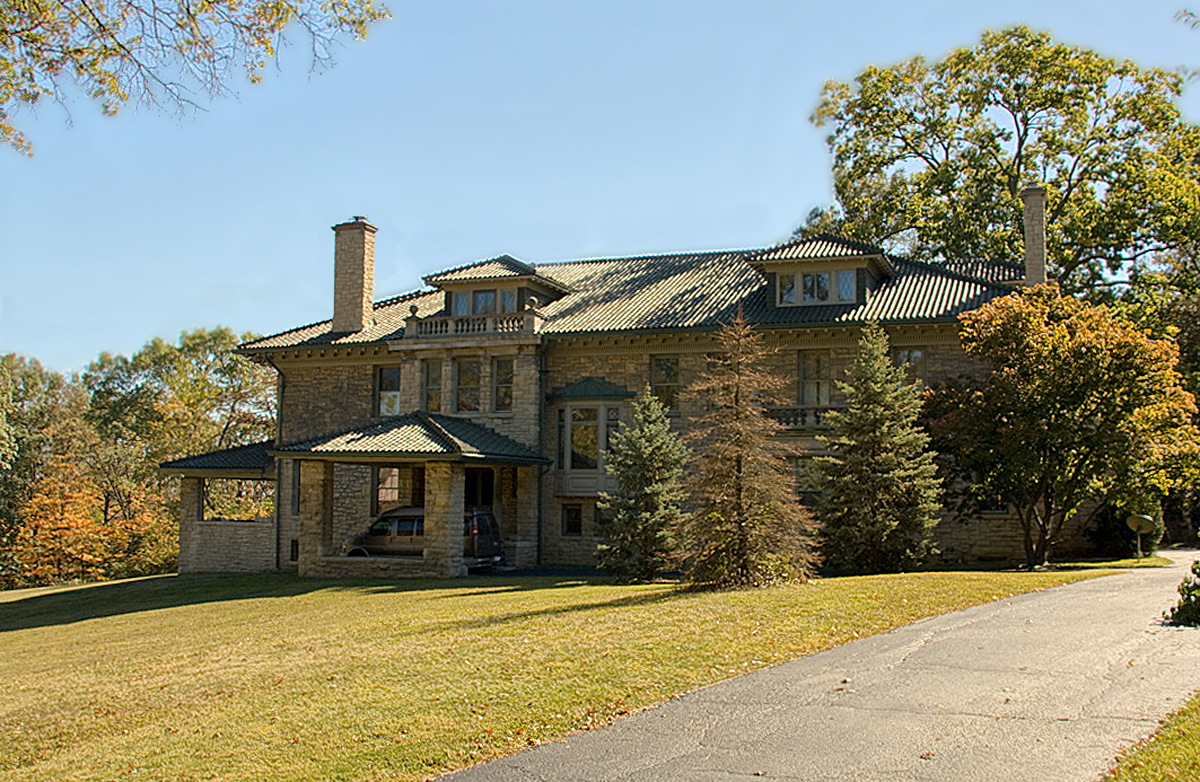
- Streetside view of the house

- Location within Ohio Location within the United States
- Location: 333 Oliver Rd., Wyoming, Ohio
- Coordinates: 39°13′54″N 84°28′45″W
- Area: 8.4 acres (3.4 ha)
- Built: 1902
- Architect: Elzner & Anderson
- Architectural style: American Foursquare mansion
- MPS: Wyoming MRA
- NRHP reference No.: 86001648
- Added to NRHP: August 25, 1986

The Edward R. Stearns House is a historic residence in the city of Wyoming, Ohio, United States. Built at the turn of the twentieth century, it was the home of a business baron, and it has been designated a historic site.

== Stearns family ==
Edward Stearns was a member of a family of prominent industrialists; his relative George Stearns was a founding partner of Stearns and Foster, a company that owned a textile mill in the nearby village of Lockland and operated a mattress-manufacturing plant, and Edward was later the company's head. Edward lived in the house from its construction until his death in 1914, after which a later company chief, Evan Foster Stearns, moved in with his family; his son Evan Jr., who also led the firm, was born in the house and lived there until 1984.

== Historic context ==
Good transportation is a leading reason for Wyoming's prosperity. The city lies near the old pre-statehood road that connected Cincinnati with locations farther north, such as Fort Hamilton and Fallen Timbers. Curves in the road were cut off in 1806, forming a new road that is today followed by Springfield Pike through central Wyoming. Improvements in the 1830s only enhanced its importance. By this time, another mode of transportation had become significant: the Miami and Erie Canal was built a short distance to the east in 1828, and the village of Lockland grew up along its side. Railroads reached the city in 1851 with the construction of the Cincinnati, Hamilton, and Dayton Railroad on the border between Lockland and Wyoming.

Because of Wyoming's proximity to the industry of Lockland, its easy transportation to the booming city of Cincinnati, and its pleasant scenery, many wealthy industrialists purchased local farms and built grand country houses. Most such houses were built in the Wyoming Hills area, west of Springfield Pike; growth in this area continued until the coming of the Great Depression.

== Architecture ==
Built in 1902 according to a design by Alfred Oscar Elzner's firm, the Stearns House is a stone building with a stone foundation and a terracotta roof. Among its leading architectural features appears at the middle of the facade: a pavilion with a porte-cochère. Other structural details, such as the hip roof sitting atop the two-story walls, give it an appearance of a variant of the American Foursquare. It is distinguished from comparable houses in the city by its massive size, which helps to create an unusually strong sense of early twentieth century architecture in its appearance.

== Historic site ==
In 1979, a local historic preservation group began a citywide survey to identify Wyoming's historic buildings, and this effort culminated with a multiple property submission of eighteen houses, the Wyoming Presbyterian Church, and one historic district to the National Register of Historic Places in 1985. Among these houses was the home of William Stearns, Edward's relative and another early Stearns and Foster executive. Along with all but one of the other properties, both Stearns houses were listed on the Register in the following year, qualifying because of their important architecture and because of their prominent original residents.
