= William Stearns House =

Historic house in Ohio, United States

- U.S. National Register of Historic Places
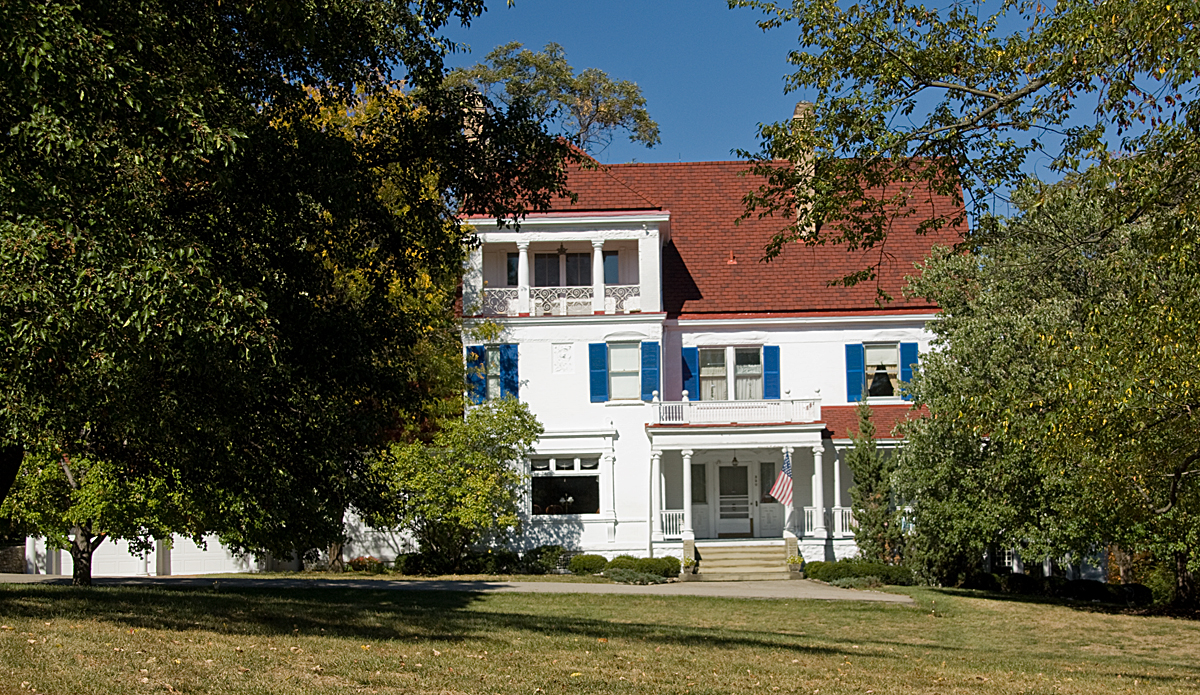
- Streetside view of the house

- Location within Ohio Location within the United States
- Location: 320 Reily Rd., Wyoming, Ohio
- Coordinates: 39°13′47″N 84°28′45″W
- Area: 1.9 acres (0.77 ha)
- Built: 1900
- Architectural style: Queen Anne
- MPS: Wyoming MRA
- NRHP reference No.: 86001649
- Added to NRHP: August 25, 1986

The William Stearns House is a historic residence in the city of Wyoming, Ohio, United States, near Cincinnati. Built at the turn of the twentieth century, it was the home of a business baron, and it has been designated a historic site.

== William Stearns ==
William Stearns was a member of a family of prominent industrialists; his father George was a founding partner of Stearns and Foster, a company that owned a textile mill in the nearby village of Lockland and operated a mattress-manufacturing plant. Born in 1857, Stearns eventually came to head the company before his death in 1937.

== Historic context ==
Good transportation is a leading reason for Wyoming's prosperity. The city lies near the old pre-statehood road that connected Cincinnati with locations farther north, such as Fort Hamilton and Fallen Timbers. Curves in the road were cut off in 1806, forming a new road that is today followed by Springfield Pike through central Wyoming. Improvements in the 1830s only enhanced its importance. By this time, another mode of transportation had become significant: the Miami and Erie Canal was built a short distance to the east in 1828, and the village of Lockland grew up along its side. Railroads reached the city in 1851 with the construction of the Cincinnati, Hamilton, and Dayton Railroad on the border between Lockland and Wyoming.

Because of Wyoming's proximity to the industry of Lockland, its easy transportation to the booming city of Cincinnati, and its pleasant scenery, many wealthy industrialists purchased local farms and built grand country houses. Most such houses were built in the Wyoming Hills area, west of Springfield Pike; growth in this area continued until the coming of the Great Depression.

== Architecture ==
Built in 1900, the Stearns House is a brick building with a stone foundation and a terracotta roof. Some of its structural details place it into the Queen Anne style of architecture, although its simple rectangular plan is atypical of the style. The two-and-a-half-story residence features a pavilion on the left side of the facade and a large porch elsewhere on the front and eastern side. One wishing to enter the house will ascend sandstone steps to the porch, which features iron railings, Ionic columns, and an ornate balustrade. All of its architectural elements combine to make it one of the city's most prominent examples of the Queen Anne style.

== Historic site ==
In 1979, a local historic preservation group began a citywide survey to identify Wyoming's historic buildings, and this effort culminated with a multiple property submission of eighteen houses, the Wyoming Presbyterian Church, and one historic district to the National Register of Historic Places in 1985. Among these houses was the home of Edward R. Stearns, William's relative and another early Stearns and Foster executive. Along with all but one of the other properties, both Stearns houses were listed on the Register in the following year, qualifying because of their important architecture and because of their prominent original residents. The William Stearns House is one of five Reily Road houses included in this group, along with the Charles Fay House, the Luethstrom-Hurin House, the John C. Pollock House, and the Louis Sawyer House.
