= George Hoadley Jr. House =

Historic house in Ohio, United States

- U.S. National Register of Historic Places
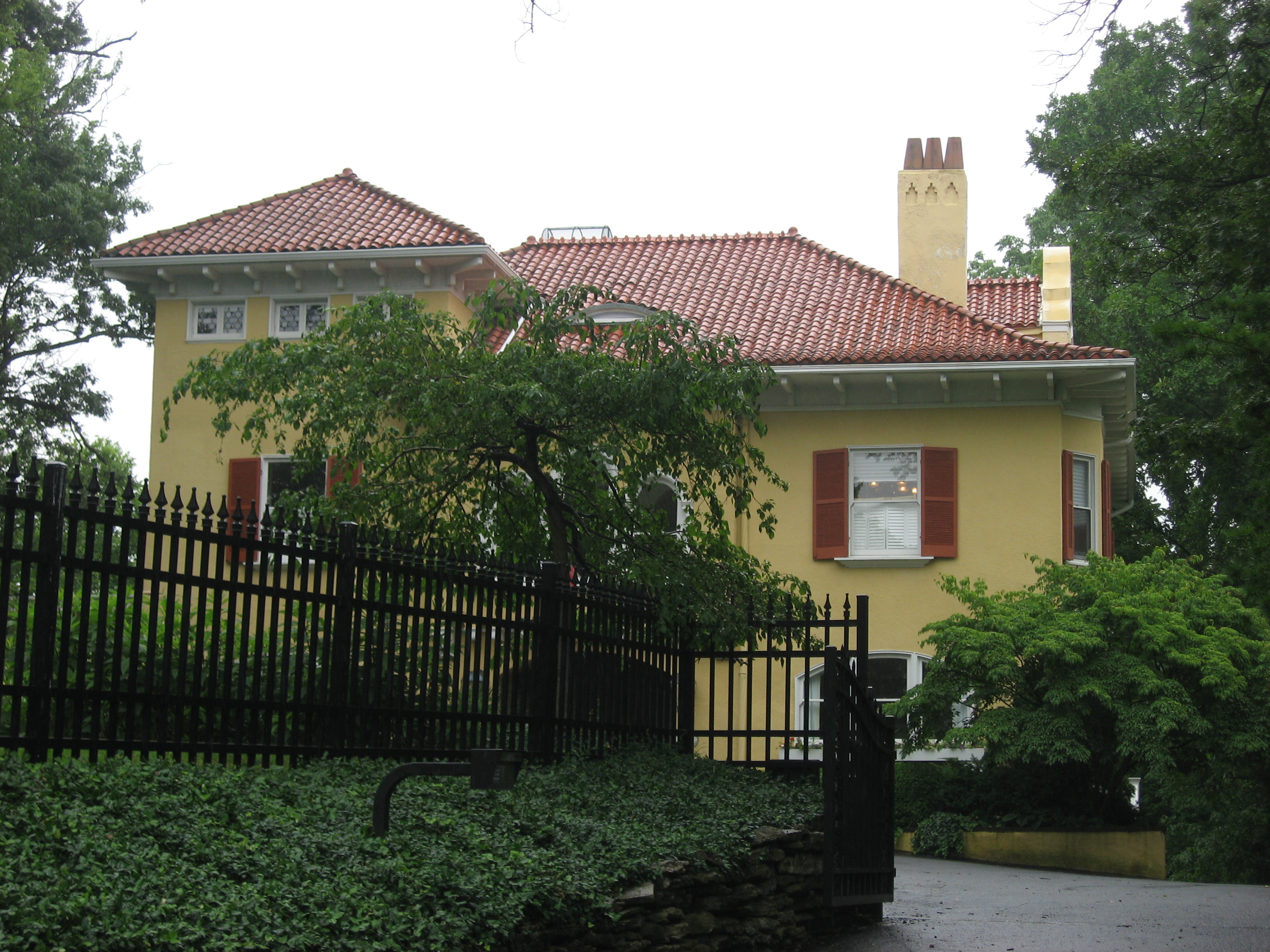
- Front of the house

- Location within Ohio Location within the United States
- Location: 2337 Grandin Rd., Cincinnati, Ohio
- Coordinates: 39°7′41″N 84°27′10″W
- Area: 1 acre (0.40 ha)
- Built: 1900
- Architect: Elzner & Anderson
- Architectural style: Mission/Spanish Revival
- NRHP reference No.: 90000380
- Added to NRHP: March 9, 1990

The George Hoadley Jr. House is a historic residence in the Hyde Park neighborhood of Cincinnati, Ohio, United States. Built in 1900, it has been named a historic site because of its unusual construction.

The son of George Hoadly, the governor of Ohio in the 1880s, George Hoadley Jr. was a prominent Cincinnati lawyer and one of the partners in the law firm of Harmon, Colston, Goldsmith, and Hoadley. At the end of the 1890s, Hoadley commissioned the design of his new house from one of the area's more prominent architectural firms: Elzner and Anderson, which had already produced such structures as the Ingalls Building downtown. Leading proponents of construction with concrete, Elzner and Anderson designed many buildings with the material, but the Hoadley House is one of just two concrete houses that displays the material on its exterior; it is covered with a fake stucco made from concrete. Aside from the exterior, it is much more of a typical area house, being a three-story building with a frame structure, a stone foundation, minor elements of wood, and a roof of ceramic tiles.

In 1990, the Hoadley House was listed on the National Register of Historic Places; besides the house itself, the designation included a single contributing outbuilding. The house qualified for inclusion on the Register because of its distinctive historic architecture: besides its unusual material, it is significant as one of Cincinnati's earliest and most ornate surviving Mission Revival buildings.
