= Alfred Oscar Elzner =

American architect

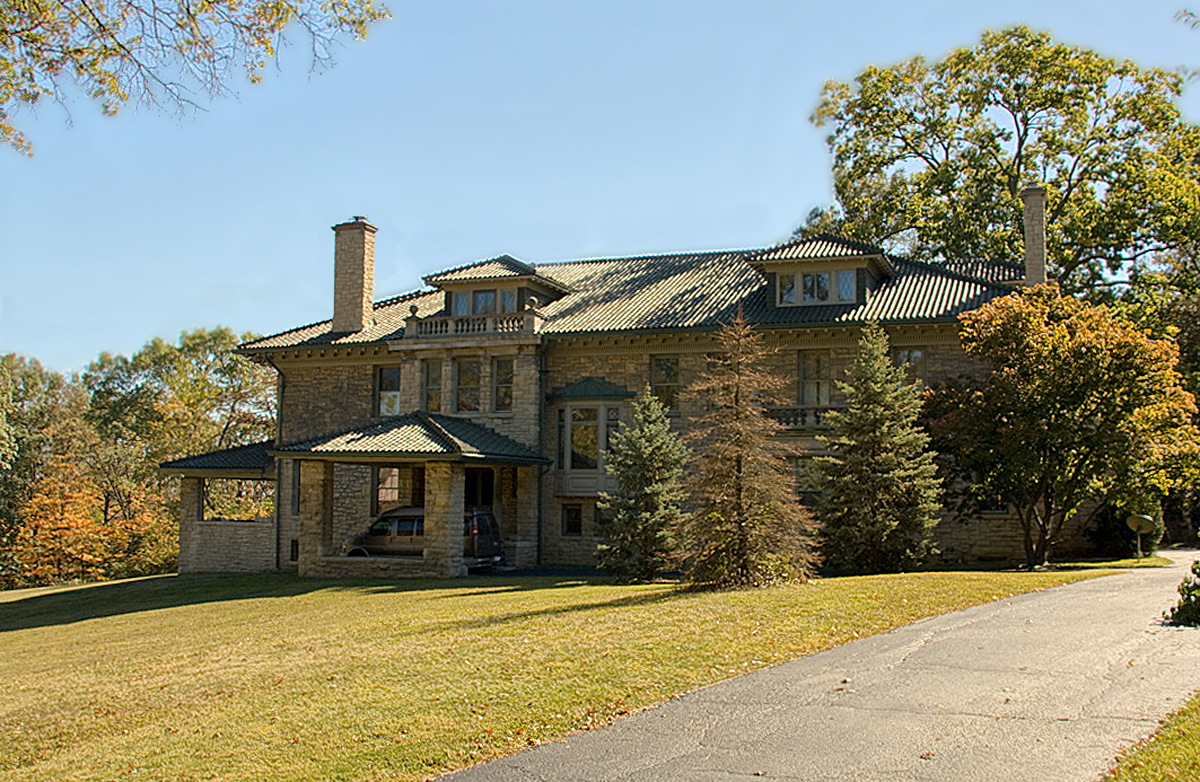
The Edward R. Stearns House in Wyoming, Ohio, built 1902

Alfred Oscar Elzner (December 12, 1862 in Cincinnati–1933) was a prominent American architect in Cincinnati, Ohio. Along with George M. Anderson, he formed a partnership known as the firm of Elzner & Anderson.

== Biography of Elzner ==
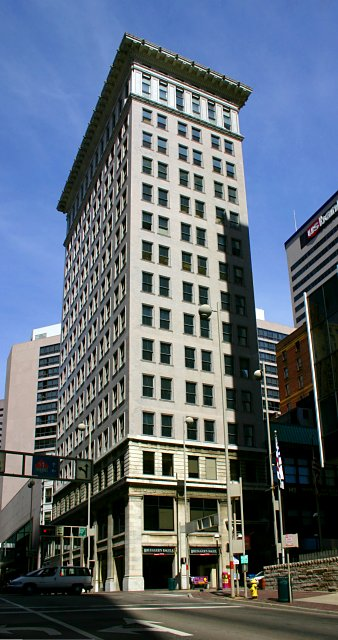
The 15-story Ingalls Building (1903) in Cincinnati, Ohio was the world's first reinforced concrete skyscraper

Elzner studied art with Thomas Satterwhite Noble, C.T. Webber, and Frank Duveneck, and attended the Ohio Mechanics Institute and the Massachusetts Institute of Technology. He worked for James W. McLaughlin in Cincinnati during the early 1880s and was superintendent for H.H. Richardson's Cincinnati Chamber of Commerce Building.

Elzner established his own practice in 1887; he was joined by George M. Anderson in 1896. His firm, Elzner & Anderson, designed the Ingalls Building in Northwest Cincinnati at the intersection of Fourth Street and Vine Street, diagonally opposite Richardson's Chamber of Commerce Building. The Ingalls Building, named for railroad baron Melville E. Ingalls, is said to have been "the first reinforced concrete high-rise office building in the world." Elzner's clientele included members of the prominent Taft, Emery, Procter, and Bullock families, as well as "Cincinnati’s German-American elite."

== Projects ==
- Children's Home Admin. Bldg. Cinti, Ohio D.Meinken & Sons General Contractor Cinti, Ohio
- Children's Home East and West Homes Madisonville, Ohio D.Meinken & Sons Contractor Cinti, Ohio
- The Children's Hospital Nurses' Home D.Meinken & Sons General Contractor Cinti, Ohio
- George Hoadley Jr. House in Cincinnati, NRHP listed
- Cincinnati Y.M.C.A. (before 1919) NWC Central Parkway and Elm St.
- Designs for the Cincinnati Country Club on Grandin Rd, Hyde Park
- Linden Place, Cincinnati (1924)
- Homestead Hotel, Hot Springs, Virginia one of architects credited.
- New Jerusalem Church, Cincinnati
- J.B. Schroder & Co. residence and hardware store in Cincinnati
- Old Timbers Lodge at the US Army Jefferson Proving Ground, approximately .5 mi. SE of jct. of K Rd. and Northeast Exit in Madison, Indiana (credited to Elzner), NRHP listed (built by Alexander Thomson?)
- Procter and Collier-Beau Brummell Building 440 E. McMillan St. in Cincinnati, NRHP listed
- Edward R. Stearns House 333 Oliver Rd. Wyoming, Ohio, NRHP listed
- Stimson Memorial Hall Maine 26 E side, .5 mi. N of jct. with US 202 Gray, Maine, NRHP listed
- Berea College, Kentucky (1932 addition and upgrade) to the first interracial and coeducational college in the South
