= Josiah Kirby House =

Historic house in Ohio, United States

- U.S. National Register of Historic Places
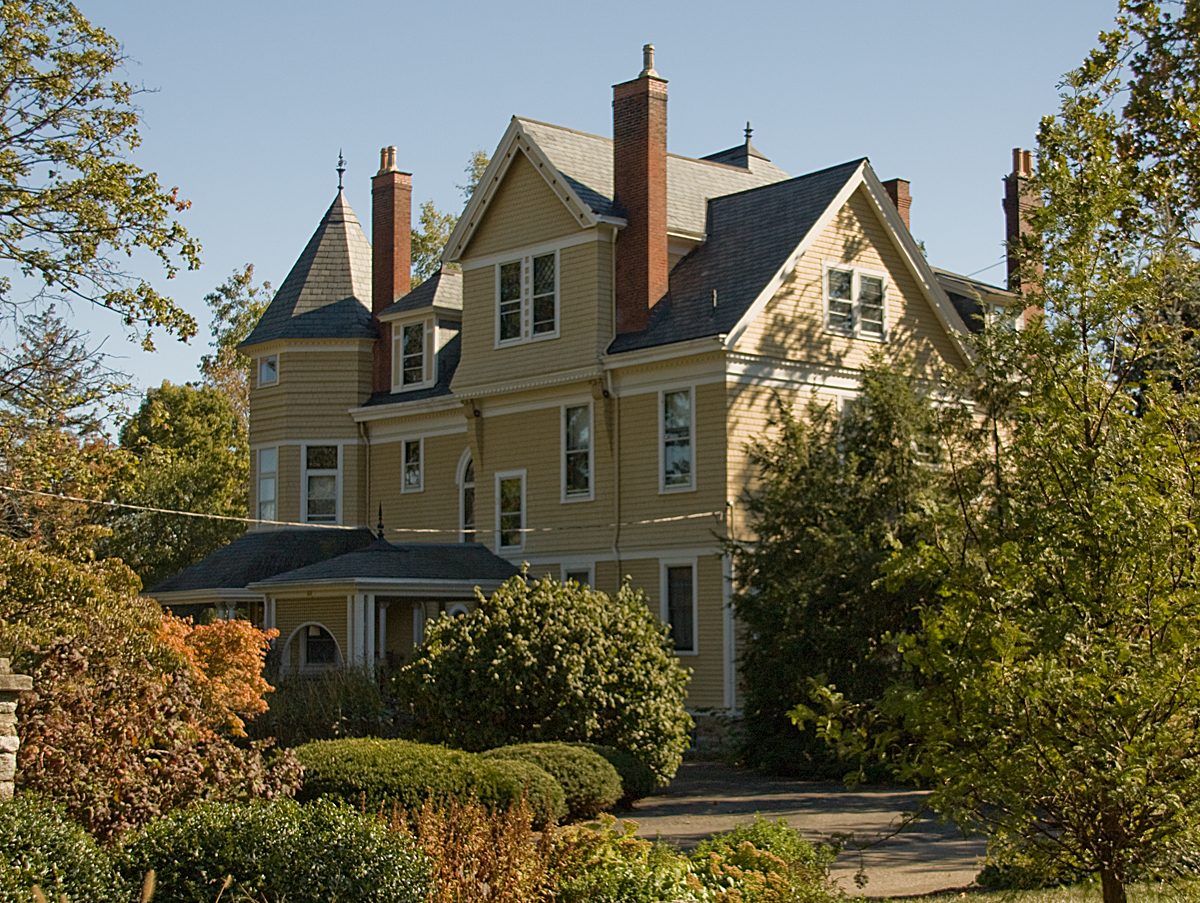
- Front of the house

- Location within Ohio Location within the United States
- Location: 65 Oliver Rd., Wyoming, Ohio
- Coordinates: 39°13′54″N 84°28′27″W
- Area: 1.1 acres (0.45 ha)
- Built: 1890
- Architectural style: Queen Anne, Shingle Style
- MPS: Wyoming MRA
- NRHP reference No.: 86001634
- Added to NRHP: August 25, 1986

The Josiah Kirby House is a historic residence in the city of Wyoming, Ohio, United States. Erected in the late nineteenth century, it was originally the home of a prominent Cincinnati-area businessman and politician, and it has been designated a historic site.

== Josiah Kirby ==
Josiah Kirby was one of the Cincinnati metropolitan area's leading industrialists in the late nineteenth century. Having invented multiple kinds of heavy machinery, he held high executive positions with two different railroad companies and served a term as the president of the Cincinnati Board of Trade. These prominent positions led him to become involved in politics; he was elected to the Ohio Senate, where he served from 1880 to 1881.

== Historic context ==
Good transportation is a leading reason for Wyoming's prosperity. The city lies near the old pre-statehood road that connected Cincinnati with locations farther north, such as Fort Hamilton and Fallen Timbers. Curves in the road were cut off in 1806, forming a new road that is today followed by Springfield Pike through central Wyoming. Improvements in the 1830s only enhanced its importance. By this time, another mode of transportation had become significant: the Miami and Erie Canal was built a short distance to the east in 1828, and the village of Lockland grew up along its side. Railroads reached the city in 1851 with the construction of the Cincinnati, Hamilton, and Dayton Railroad on the border between Lockland and Wyoming.

Because of Wyoming's proximity to the industry of Lockland, its easy transportation to the booming city of Cincinnati, and its pleasant scenery, many wealthy industrialists purchased local farms and built grand country houses. Most such houses were built in the Wyoming Hills area, west of Springfield Pike; growth in this area continued until the coming of the Great Depression. Kirby was typical of these rich industrialists, building a large house and commuting to Cincinnati daily.

== Architecture ==
Kirby's Wyoming house was built in 1890 in a Shingle-style variant of the Queen Anne style of architecture. Featuring a weatherboarded exterior and a stone foundation and a slate roof, it is a frame building, two-and-a-half stories tall. Among its notable elements are various Neoclassical details, windows of high-quality art glass, and a verandah with columns in the Beaux-Arts style. Overall, the house is a mix of styles, mingling older styles with the latest in floor plans.

Weatherboarding was a typical exterior for large Wyoming houses: brick was far more common in most of southwestern Ohio, but the importance of lumber mills in Lockland and the fact that many mill owners lived in Wyoming caused wood to become the exterior of choice for most houses in Wyoming and the nearby communities of Hartwell and Glendale. Also common to many of the area's houses was the presence of art glass, which many residences feature in large parlor windows.

== Recognition ==
Since Kirby ceased to live in the house, it has seen very few changes: both the interior and exterior are remarkably similar to their original condition.

In 1979, a local historic preservation group began a citywide survey to identify Wyoming's historic buildings, and this effort culminated with a multiple property submission of eighteen houses, the Wyoming Presbyterian Church, and one historic district to the National Register of Historic Places in 1985. Along with all but one of the other properties, the Josiah Kirby House was listed on the Register in the following year, qualifying because of its historically significant architecture and its place as the home of a leading local citizen.
