= Procter and Collier–Beau Brummell Building =

- U.S. National Register of Historic Places
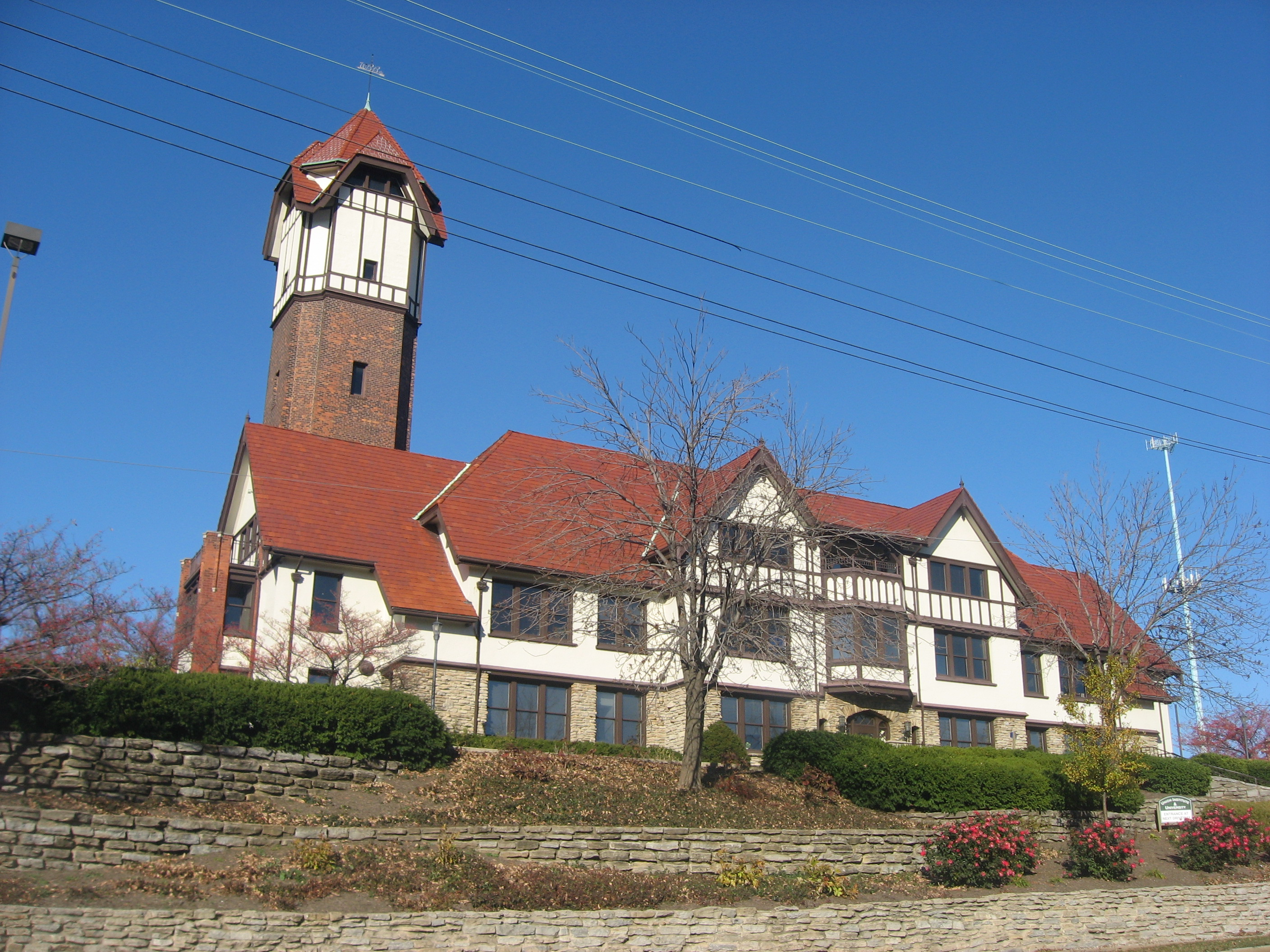
- Front of the building

- Location within Ohio Location within the United States
- Location: Cincinnati, Ohio
- Coordinates: 39°7′37″N 84°30′0″W
- Architect: Elzner & Anderson
- Architectural style: Tudorbethan architecture
- NRHP reference No.: 84002714
- Added to NRHP: October 18, 1984

The Procter and Collier–Beau Brummell Building is a registered historic building in Cincinnati, Ohio. It is located at 440 East McMillan St in the Walnut Hills neighborhood.

== History ==
It was designed by the Cincinnati architectural firm of Elzner & Anderson in the Tudor Revival style and built in 1921 for the Procter and Collier advertising agency. The Beau Brummell clothing company moved into the building in 1936 and used it to manufacture men’s neckties until the company closed in 1982. The Beau Brummell Company, named for the 19th century dandy known for his elegant clothing, was founded by Harry and Edward Weisbaum and Sam A. Brower in 1923. They once had 150 workers making ties in the building. By 1982, there were 40 employees. “We don’t usually give up on an operation,” Daniel Manella, Vice President of New York-based Rapid-American Corp. told the Cincinnati Post in 1982. “Especially an old, established company, but it got to a point where it made very poor business sense to continue.”

Union Institute & University acquired the structure in 1989 and restored the historic building. It was listed on the National Register on October 18, 1984.

In 2021, Union Institute & University sold the building to the University of Cincinnati.
