= Ingalls Building =

World's first reinforced concrete skyscraper

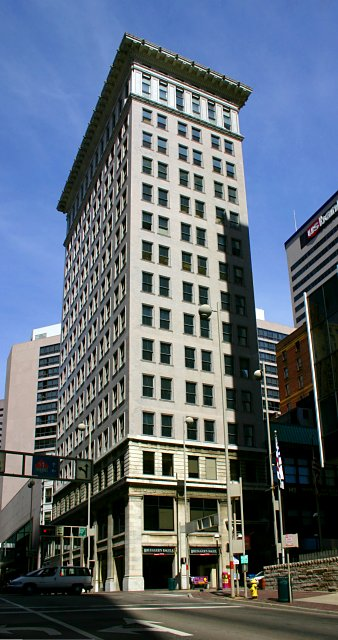
- The 16-story Ingalls Building became the world's first reinforced concrete skyscraper in 1903
- Interactive map of the Ingalls Building area
- Alternative names: Courtyard by Marriott Cincinnati Downtown

General information
- Location: 6 E. 4th St., Cincinnati, Ohio
- Coordinates: 39°06′00″N 84°30′45″W
- Named for: Melville E. Ingalls
- Year built: 1903

Technical details
- Material: Reinforced concrete
- Floor count: 16
- Grounds: Less than 1 acre (0.40 ha)

Design and construction
- Architecture firm: Elzner & Anderson
- Engineer: Henry N. Hooper
- Known for: First skyscraper made of reinforced concrete
- Ingalls Building
- U.S. National Register of Historic Places
- NRHP reference No.: 75001418
- Added to NRHP: March 7, 1975

The Ingalls Building, built in 1903 in Cincinnati, Ohio, is the world's first reinforced concrete skyscraper. The 16-story building was designed by the Cincinnati architectural firm Elzner & Anderson and was named for its primary financial investor, Melville E. Ingalls. The building was considered a daring engineering feat at the time, but its success contributed to the acceptance of concrete construction in high-rise buildings in the United States. It was converted to a hotel, the Courtyard by Marriott Cincinnati Downtown, in 2021.

The Ingalls building is bordered by East 4th Street and Vine Street in the Cincinnati Central Business District.

== Overcoming skepticism ==
Prior to 1902, the tallest reinforced concrete structure in the world was only six stories high. Since concrete possesses very low tensile (pulling) strength, many people from both the public and the engineering community believed that a concrete tower as tall as the plan for the Ingalls Building would collapse under wind loads or even its own weight. When the building was completed and the supports removed, one reporter allegedly stayed awake through the night in order to be the first to report on the building's demise.

Ingalls and engineer Henry N. Hooper were convinced, however, that Ernest L. Ransome's system of casting twisted steel bars inside of concrete slabs as reinforcement (patented in 1884) and casting slab, beams and joists as a unit would allow them to create a rigid structure. The architects also prized the cost savings and fireproofing advantages of concrete over steel frame construction. Finally, after two years of convincing, city officials issued Ingalls a building permit and the work began.

== Construction ==
Hooper designed a monolithic "concrete box of eight-inch [200 mm] walls, with concrete floors and roof, concrete beams, concrete columns, concrete stairs -- no steel. It consists merely of bars embedded in concrete, with the ends interlaced." (Ali)

The amount of concrete produced during construction—100 cubic yards (76 m^{3}) in each ten-hour shift—was limited by the rate at which the builders could place it. An extra wet mix was used to ensure complete contact with the rebars and uniform density in the columns. Floor slabs were poured without joints at the rate of three stories per month. Columns measured 30 by 34 inches (760 by 860 mm) for the first ten floors and 12 inches (300 mm) square for the rest. Three sets of forms were used, rotating from the bottom to the top of the building when the concrete had cured. Completed in eight months, the finished building measures 50 by 100 feet (15 by 30 m) at its base and 210 feet (64 m) tall.

The exterior concrete walls are eight inches thick (200 mm) in unbroken slabs 16 feet (5 m) square with a veneer 4 to 6 inches (100 to 150 mm) thick. The Beaux Arts Classical exterior is covered on the first three stories with white marble, on the next eleven stories with glazed gray brick, and on the top floor and cornice with glazed white terra cotta.

== Later history ==
Commemorative plaque mounted near the entrance of the Ingalls Building

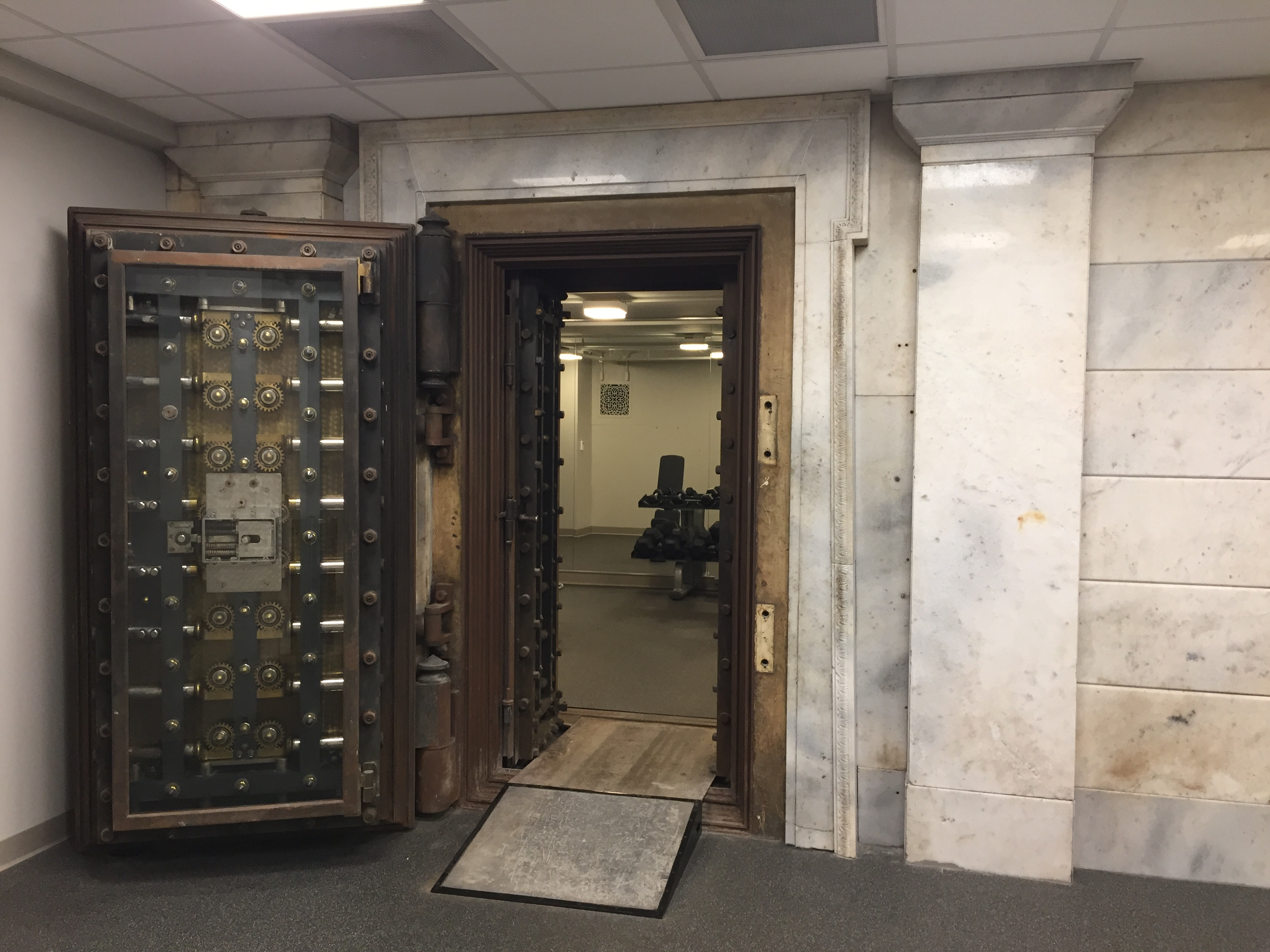
A vault in the building, now in use as an exercise room for the hotel

Still in use today, the building was designated a National Historic Civil Engineering Landmark in 1974 by the American Society of Civil Engineers. In 1975, it was added to the National Register of Historic Places.

The building was purchased on January 17, 2013, by CLA OH LLC (an affiliate of Claremont Group, a New York City-based real estate development firm) from CapCar Realty 1.1 LLC, for $1.45 million. In November 2013, Claremont Group CEO Perry Chopra disclosed his intentions to convert the office building into 40 to 50 condos, with ground-floor retail. However, in April 2015, a real estate broker announced that the building was again for sale, after Claremont Group decided not to execute the condominium project.

It was converted to a hotel, the Courtyard by Marriott Cincinnati Downtown, in 2021.

== See also ==
- List of historic civil engineering landmarks
