= Melville E. Ingalls =

American businessman

Melville Ezra Ingalls
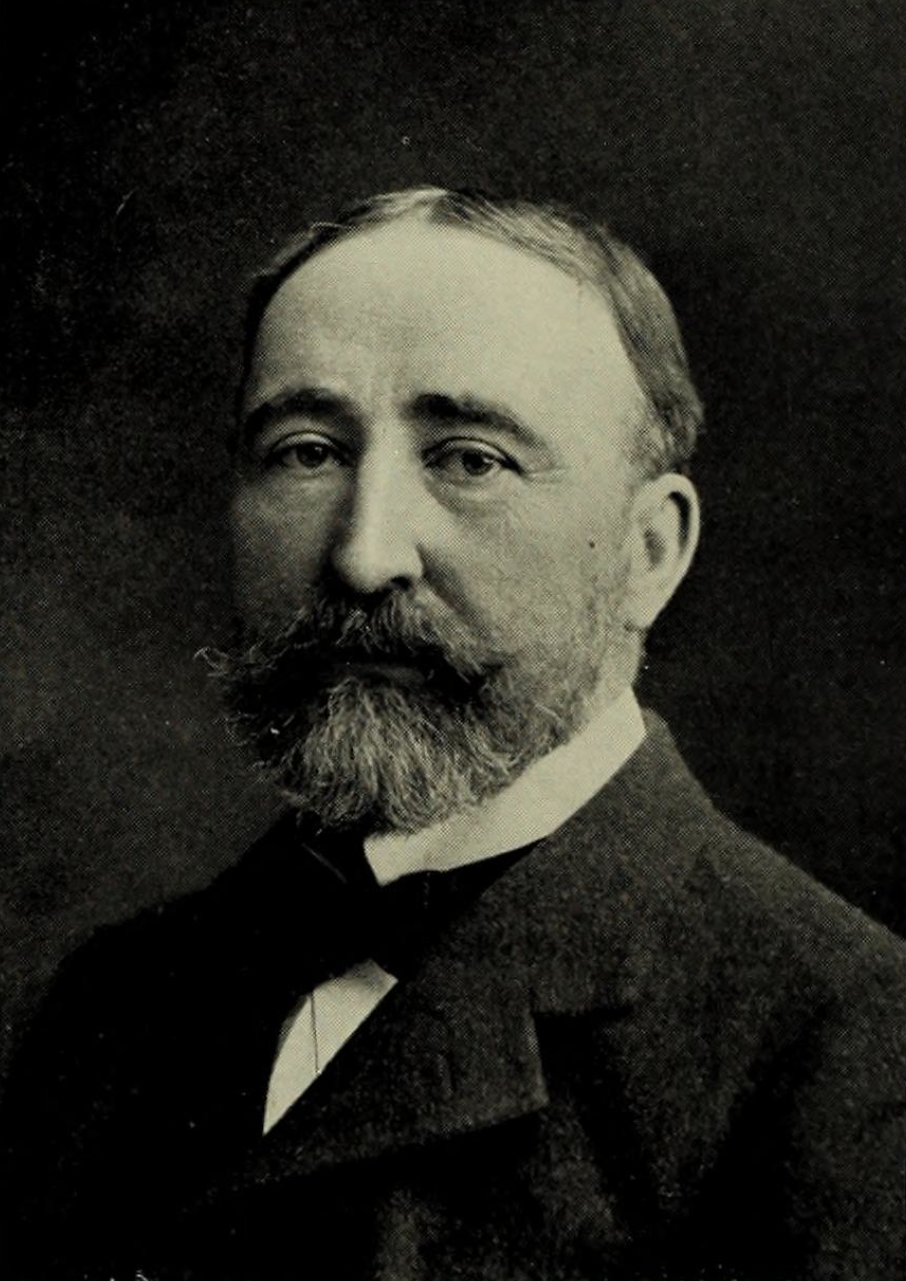
- Born: September 6, 1842; Harrison, Maine, U.S.
- Died: July 11, 1914 (aged 71); Hot Springs, Virginia, U.S.
- Burial place: Spring Grove Cemetery

Member of the 89th Massachusetts House of Representatives
- In office 1868

President of the Boston Common Council
- In office 1871
- Preceded by: William Giles Harris
- Succeeded by: Matthias Rich

Melville Ezra Ingalls (September 6, 1842 – July 11, 1914), commonly abbreviated M. E. Ingalls, was a Massachusetts state legislator who went on to become president of the Cleveland, Cincinnati, Chicago and St. Louis Railroad (the Big Four Railroad).

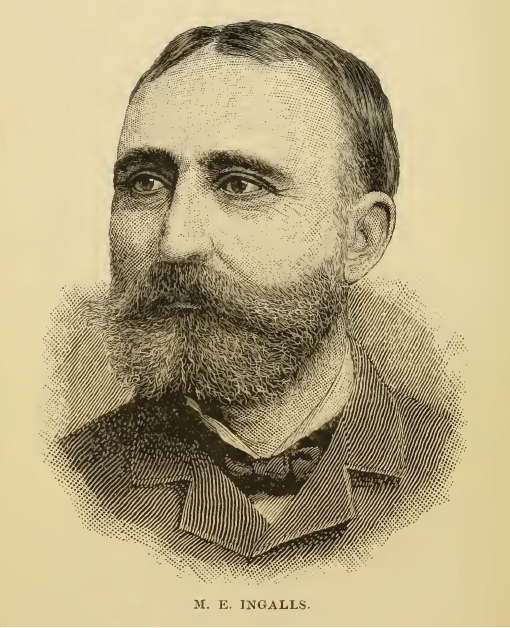
M. E. Ingalls, engraving done around 1887

== Career ==
Ingalls was born on September 6, 1842, in Harrison, Maine, where he worked on the family farm until he began teaching at the age of 16. He attended the North Bridgton Academy and went to study at Bowdoin College. He left for Harvard Law School where he graduated from in 1863. Afterwards, Ingalls began practicing law in Gray, Maine, before moving to Boston, Massachusetts, where he became an expert in corporate law, specializing in transportation lines. In 1871, he was retained as counsel to the Cincinnati and Lafayette Railroad and would eventually become its president. After multiple consolidations under his watch, the company became known as the Big Four Railroad.

Inaglls served on the Boston Common Council, serving as its president in 1870.

=== Positions held ===
- President of the Chesapeake & Ohio Railroad until 1900
- President of the Cleveland, Cincinnati, Chicago and St. Louis until 1905, Chairman of the Board until 1910
- President of the Kentucky Central Railroad (January, 1881 – October, 1883)
- President of the Cincinnati Northern Railroad
- President of the Merchants' National Bank in Cincinnati, Ohio
- Co-founder and President of the Cincinnati Art Museum
- President of the National Civic Federation in 1905
- President of the Queen City Club in Cincinnati, Ohio

On July 11, 1914, Ingalls died at his summer home in Hot Springs, Virginia, from heart disease after undergoing treatment for an ulcerated tooth. He was buried in Spring Grove Cemetery in Cincinnati, Ohio.

Ingalls also organized the Joint Traffic Association, which was shut down by the United States Supreme Court and co-founded the Cincinnati Technical School. He is the grandfather of David Sinton Ingalls.

He financed the construction of the Ingalls Building in Cincinnati, which was the world's first reinforced concrete skyscraper in 1903. The town of Ingalls, Indiana, is named in his honor.

== See also ==
- 89th Massachusetts General Court (1868)

Preceded by none	President of the Cleveland, Cincinnati, Chicago and St. Louis Railroad; 1889–1905	Succeeded by
