= Wyoming Presbyterian Church =

Historic church in Ohio, United States

- U.S. National Register of Historic Places
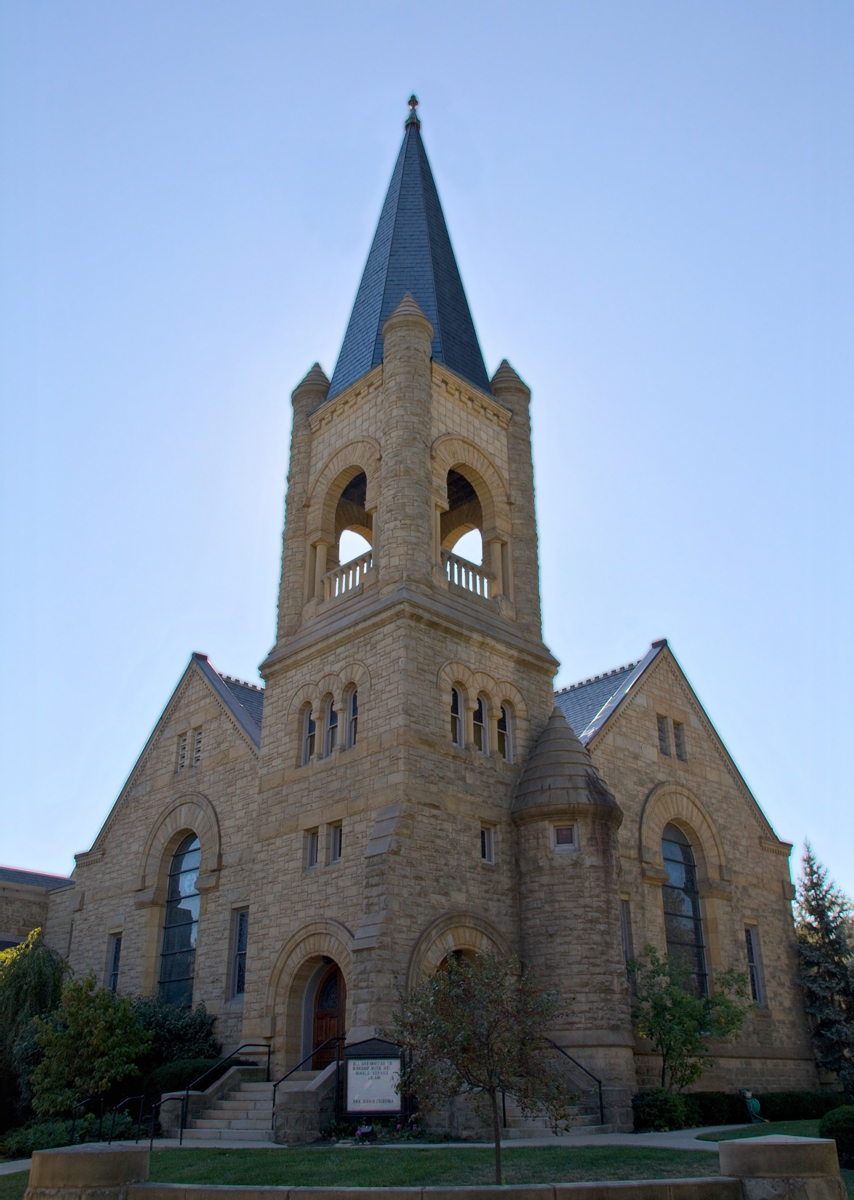
- Location: Wyoming, Ohio
- Coordinates: 39°13′38.00″N 84°28′5.05″W
- Architect: Samuel Hannaford & Sons
- Architectural style: Romanesque and Other
- MPS: Samuel Hannaford and Sons TR in Hamilton County
- NRHP reference No.: 80003094
- Added to NRHP: March 3, 1980

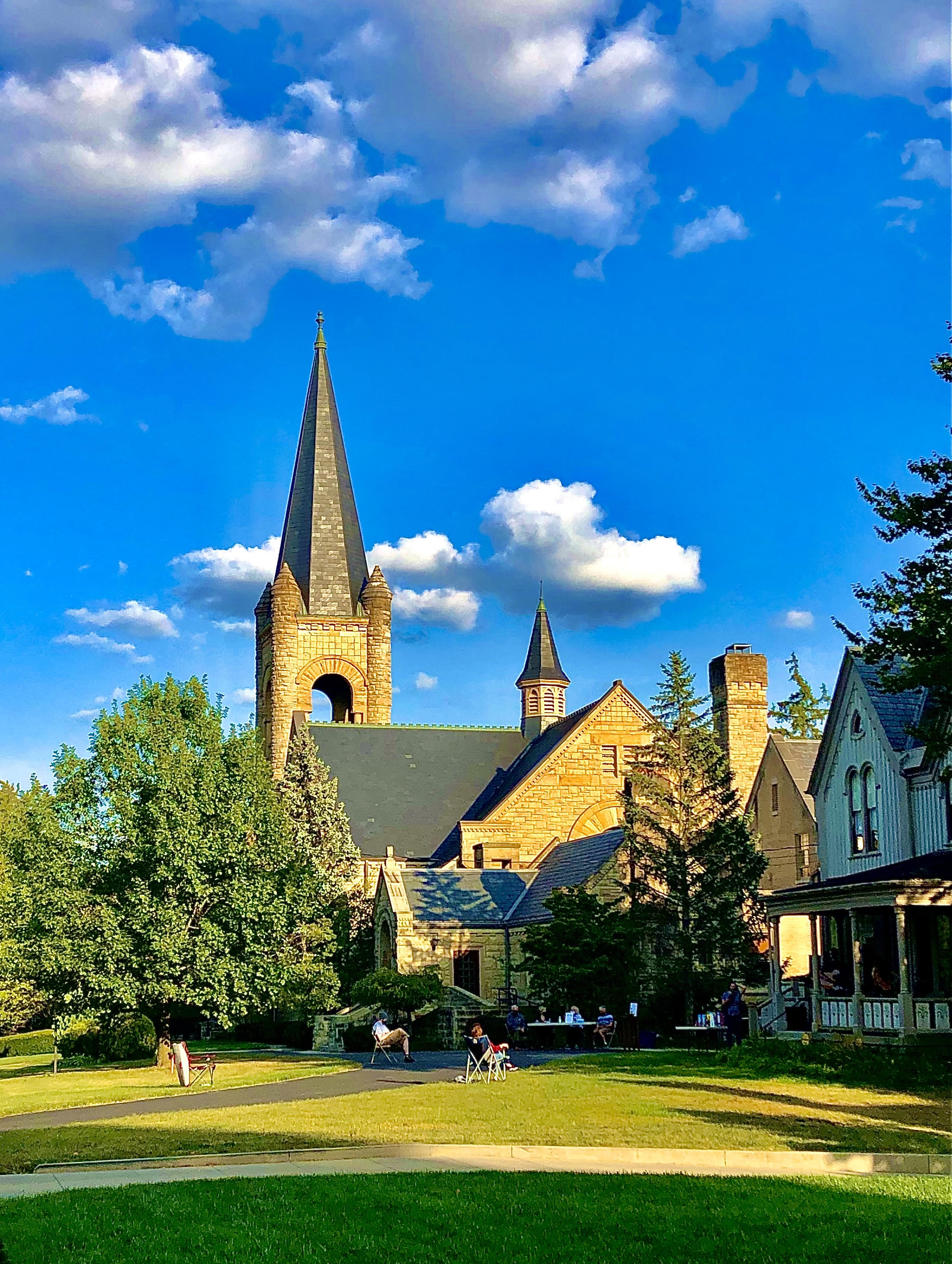
Presbyterian Church and Manse from Wyoming Ave

Wyoming Presbyterian Church is a registered historic building in Wyoming, Ohio, listed in the National Register on March 3, 1980.

The church building was completed May 18, 1890, replacing a wood frame church originally constructed in 1870. The most recent addition to the building occurred in 2003 and is visible from the Burns Ave side of the building.

== Notes ==
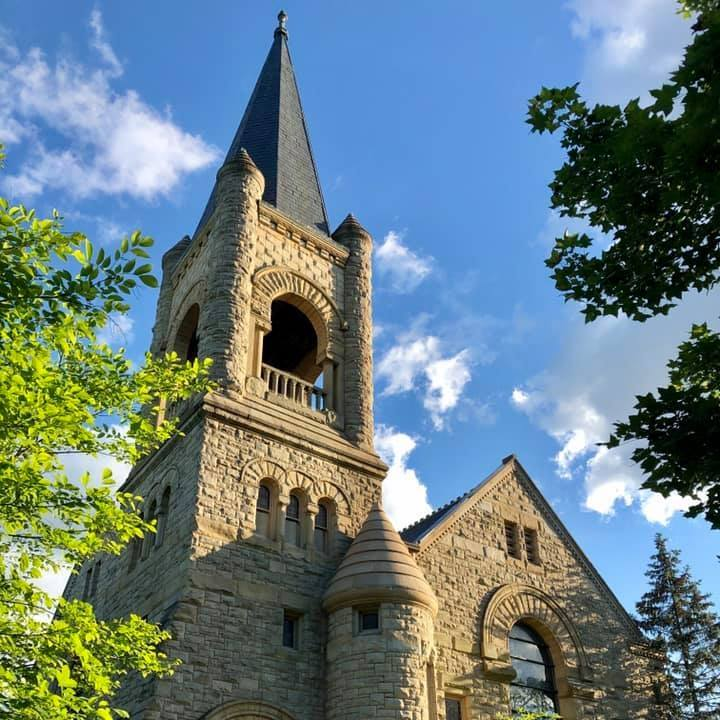
Presbyterian Church of Wyoming
