= Lockland, Ohio =

- Village
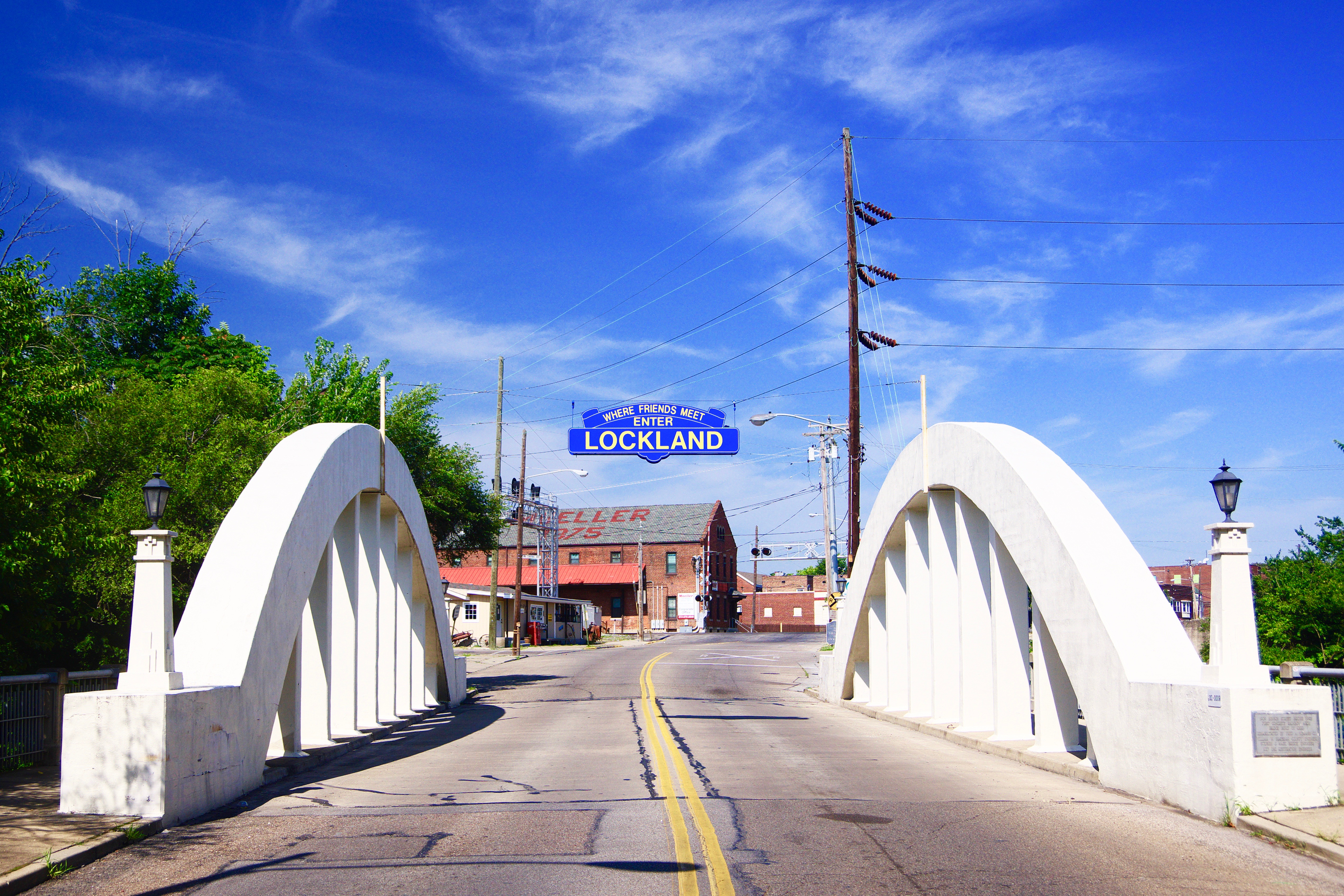
- Entrance to Lockland along the Benson Street Bridge

- Location in Hamilton County and the state of Ohio
- Coordinates: 39°13′40″N 84°27′23″W
- Country: United States
- State: Ohio
- County: Hamilton
- Platted: 1828
- Incorporated: 1849

Government
  - Type: Mayor/Council
  - Mayor: Mark Mason (R)

Area
  - Total: 1.22 sq mi (3.16 km^{2})
  - Land: 1.22 sq mi (3.16 km^{2})
  - Water: 0 sq mi (0.00 km^{2})
- Elevation: 554 ft (169 m)

Population (2020)
  - Total: 3,514
  - Density: 2,883.0/sq mi (1,113.12/km^{2})
- Time zone: UTC-5 (Eastern (EST))
  - Summer (DST): UTC-4 (EDT)
- ZIP code: 45215
- Area code: 513
- FIPS code: 39-44366
- GNIS feature ID: 1086216
- Website: www.locklandoh.org

Lockland is a village in Hamilton County, Ohio, United States. The population was 3,514 at the 2020 United States census. Lockland is located in southwest Ohio, north of Cincinnati.

== History ==
The birth of the town, and its name, are related to the first set of lock gates on the Miami and Erie Canal north of Cincinnati. The canal served as a major transportation route linking commerce from as far as New Orleans to New York City. Industry was attracted to the western Ohio area by the idea of connecting Lake Erie to the Ohio River.

Lockland provided an abundance of water power with its 15-foot (4.6 m) difference in water levels, allowing for a water-powered gristmill. A large reservoir pond allowed boats to dock for repairs or layover.

A proliferation of railways during the latter part of the nineteenth century across the area gradually reduced the waterway's usefulness, and the canal operation was officially halted in 1929. The canal sat still for a few years during the thirties. The Mill Creek Expressway reused some portions of the canal's right-of-way as well as the Wright-Lockland Highway. The National Interstate and Defense Highways Act of 1956 created today's interstate system, including Interstate 75 along the Mill Creek Expressway.

Lockland was home to the Stearns and Foster Mattress company, which was founded in Cincinnati in 1846 and moved to Lockland in 1880. The original factory and office building still stand in the downtown area of the village. However, after a fire in 2004 the two factory buildings, which sit on approximately 18 acres (73,000 m^{2}), began to be demolished. By 2015 demolition was complete, including removal of the smokestack on March 26.

The town was home to a refugee resettlement program, primarily drawing from Mauritania in 2024, with roughly 2,000–3,500 moving to the town in that time. Flow from the country slowed in 2025 with the tightening of asylum requirements under the Trump administration. 130 from the town were deported back to Mauritania.

== Geography ==
According to the United States Census Bureau, the village has a total area of 1.23 square miles (3.19 km^{2}), all land.

== Demographics ==
Historical population
Census	Pop.	Note	%±
1870	1,299		—
1880	1,884		45.0%
1890	2,474		31.3%
1900	2,695		8.9%
1910	3,439		27.6%
1920	4,007		16.5%
1930	5,703		42.3%
1940	5,601		−1.8%
1950	5,736		2.4%
1960	5,292		−7.7%
1970	5,288		−0.1%
1980	4,292		−18.8%
1990	4,357		1.5%
2000	3,707		−14.9%
2010	3,449		−7.0%
2020	3,514		1.9%
US Decennial Census

=== 2020 census ===
As of the 2020 census, Lockland had a population of 3,514 and a population density of 2,882.69 people per square mile (1,113.12/km^{2}). The median age was 36.7 years. 22.9% of residents were under the age of 18 and 12.7% of residents were 65 years of age or older. For every 100 females there were 104.4 males, and for every 100 females age 18 and over there were 107.5 males age 18 and over.

100.0% of residents lived in urban areas, while 0.0% lived in rural areas.

There were 1,529 households in Lockland, of which 27.9% had children under the age of 18 living in them. Of all households, 22.2% were married-couple households, 32.4% were households with a male householder and no spouse or partner present, and 36.0% were households with a female householder and no spouse or partner present. About 38.6% of all households were made up of individuals and 10.7% had someone living alone who was 65 years of age or older. The average household size was 2.37, and the average family size was 3.19.

There were 1,671 housing units, of which 8.5% were vacant. The homeowner vacancy rate was 0.7% and the rental vacancy rate was 7.6%.

Racial composition as of the 2020 census
Race	Number	Percent
White	1,770	50.4%
Black or African American	1,293	36.8%
American Indian and Alaska Native	19	0.5%
Asian	30	0.9%
Native Hawaiian and Other Pacific Islander	0	0.0%
Some other race	119	3.4%
Two or more races	283	8.1%
Hispanic or Latino (of any race)	150	4.3%

=== Income and poverty ===
According to the U.S. Census American Community Survey, for the period 2016-2020 the estimated median annual income for a household in the village was $37,717, and the median income for a family was $53,182. About 32.2% of the population were living below the poverty line, including 71.3% of those under age 18 and 13.0% of those age 65 or over. About 64.8% of the population were employed, and 4.9% had a bachelor's degree or higher.

=== 2010 census ===
As of the 2010 United States census, there were 3,449 people, 1,462 households, and 797 families in the village. The population density was 2,804.1 inhabitants per square mile (1,082.7/km^{2}). There were 1,738 housing units at an average density of 1,413.0 per square mile (545.6/km^{2}). The racial makeup of the village was 64.5% White, 29.9% African American, 0.2% Native American, 0.2% Asian, 0.1% Pacific Islander, 1.9% from other races, and 3.4% from two or more races. Hispanic or Latino of any race were 4.2% of the population.

There were 1,462 households, of which 29.6% had children under the age of 18 living with them, 28.5% were married couples living together, 18.2% had a female householder with no husband present, 7.8% had a male householder with no wife present, and 45.5% were non-families. 34.4% of all households were made up of individuals, and 9% had someone living alone who was 65 years of age or older. The average household size was 2.36 and the average family size was 3.04.

The median age in the village was 35.7 years. 23.8% of residents were under the age of 18; 10.5% were between the ages of 18 and 24; 28.3% were from 25 to 44; 27% were from 45 to 64; and 10.4% were 65 years of age or older. The gender makeup of the village was 51.3% male and 48.7% female.

=== 2000 census ===
As of the 2000 census, there were 3,707 people, 1,617 households, and 902 families in the village. The population density was 3,030.8 inhabitants per square mile (1,170.2/km^{2}). There were 1,826 housing units at an average density of 1,492.9 per square mile (576.4/km^{2}). The racial makeup of the village was 70.43% White, 26.30% African American, 0.27% Native American, 0.46% Asian, 0.94% from other races, and 1.59% from two or more races. Hispanic or Latino of any race were 1.54% of the population.

There were 1,617 households, out of which 27.2% had children under the age of 18 living with them, 34.8% were married couples living together, 16.1% had a female householder with no husband present, and 44.2% were non-families. 36.9% of all households were made up of individuals, and 11.8% had someone living alone who was 65 years of age or older. The average household size was 2.29 and the average family size was 2.99.

The village population contained 24.0% under the age of 18, 9.4% from 18 to 24, 33.2% from 25 to 44, 21.5% from 45 to 64, and 11.9% who were 65 years of age or older. The median age was 36 years. For every 100 females there were 101.6 males. For every 100 females age 18 and over, there were 101.0 males.

The median income for a household in the village was $28,292, and the median income for a family was $33,984. Males had a median income of $30,638 versus $22,755 for females. The per capita income for the village was $15,661. About 14.2% of families and 17.1% of the population were below the poverty line, including 26.5% of those under age 18 and 9.8% of those age 65 or over.

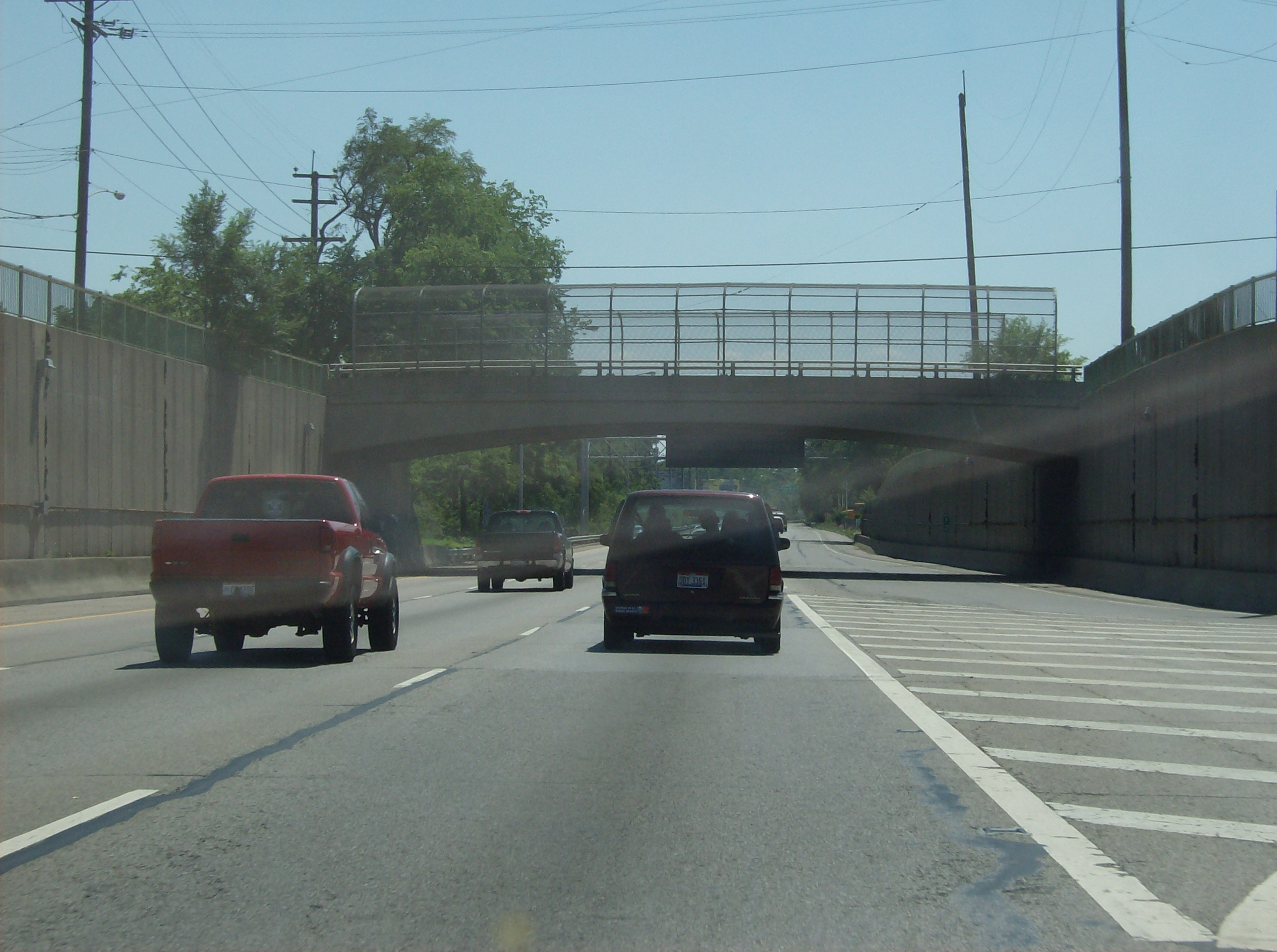
Interstate 75 passes through the old canal way in Lockland

== Notable people ==
- Jacob Ammen (1806–1894) Union Army general and civil engineer retired and died here.
- Thomas Berger (1924–2014), novelist
- William Goines (b. 1936–2024), first African-American Navy SEAL
- Ramona (1909–1972), singer and cabaret performer
