= Cincinnati =

- City
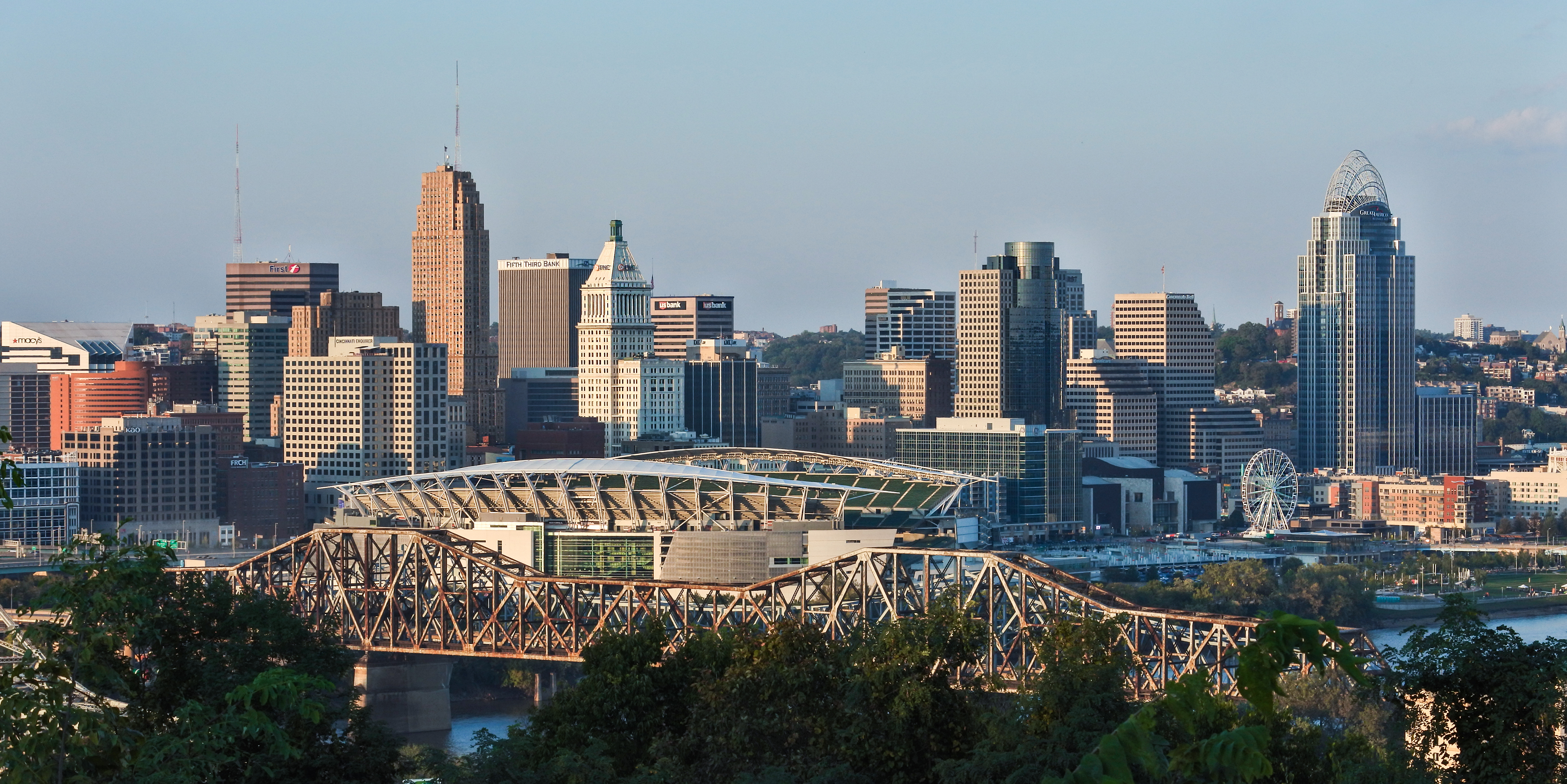
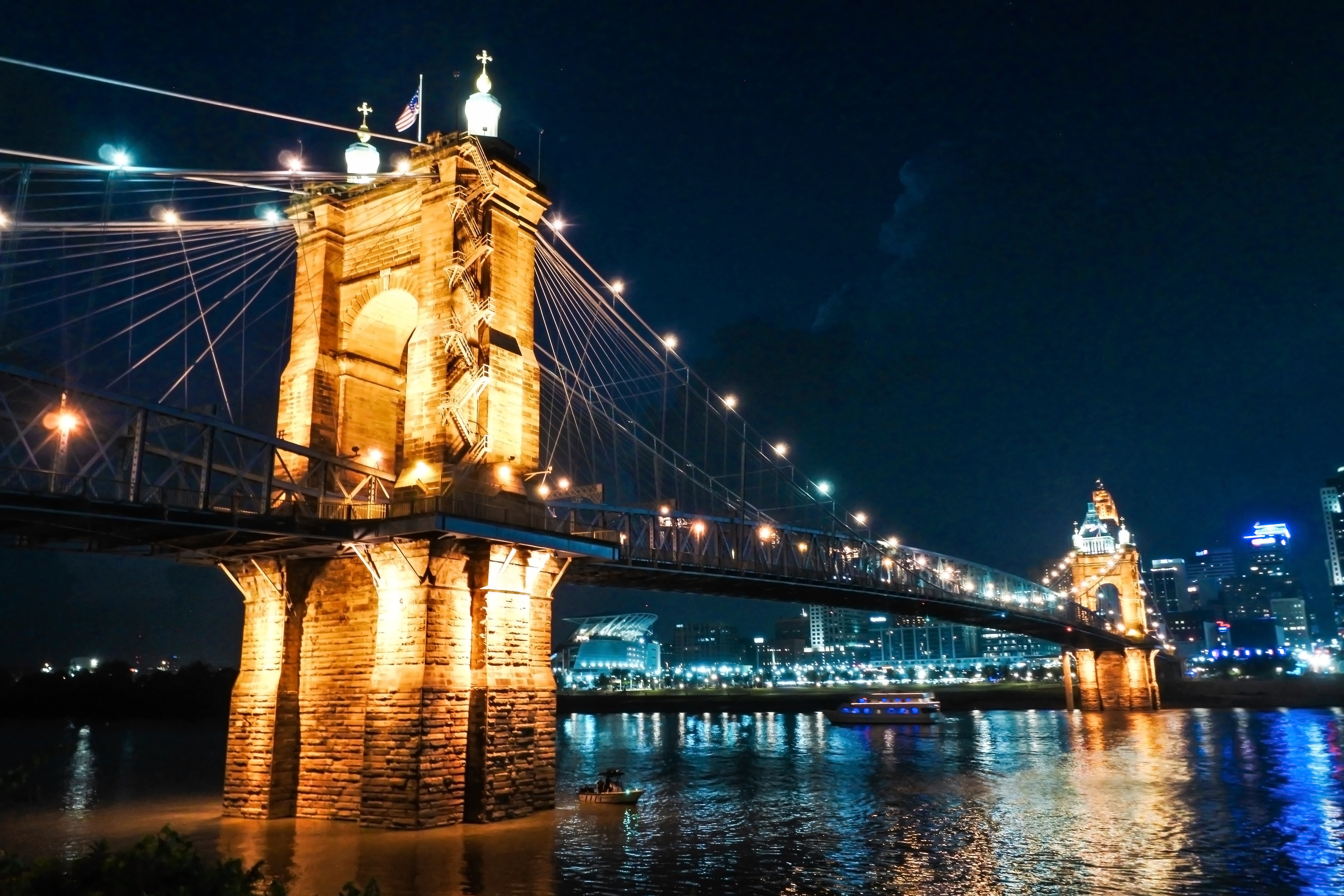
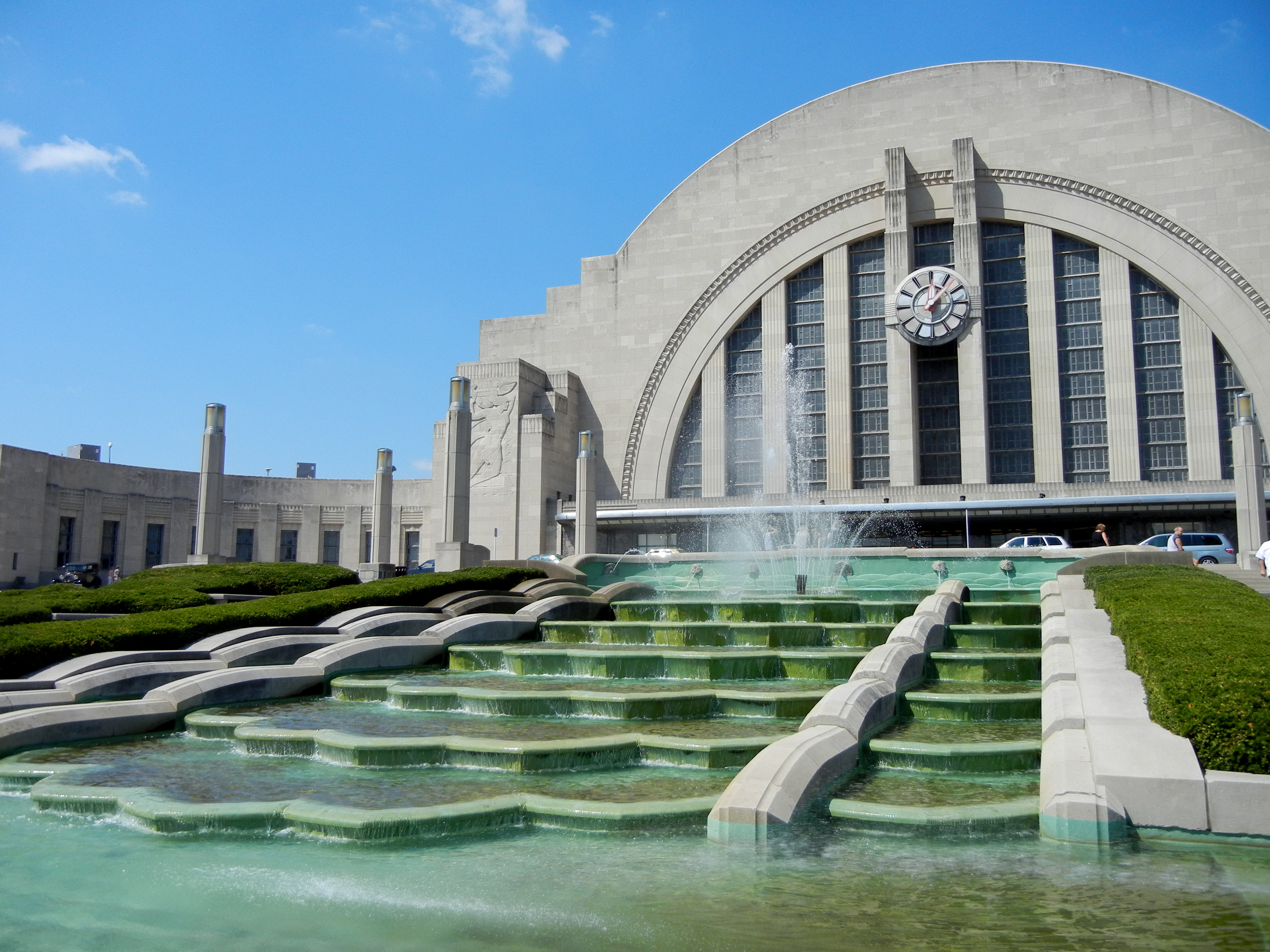
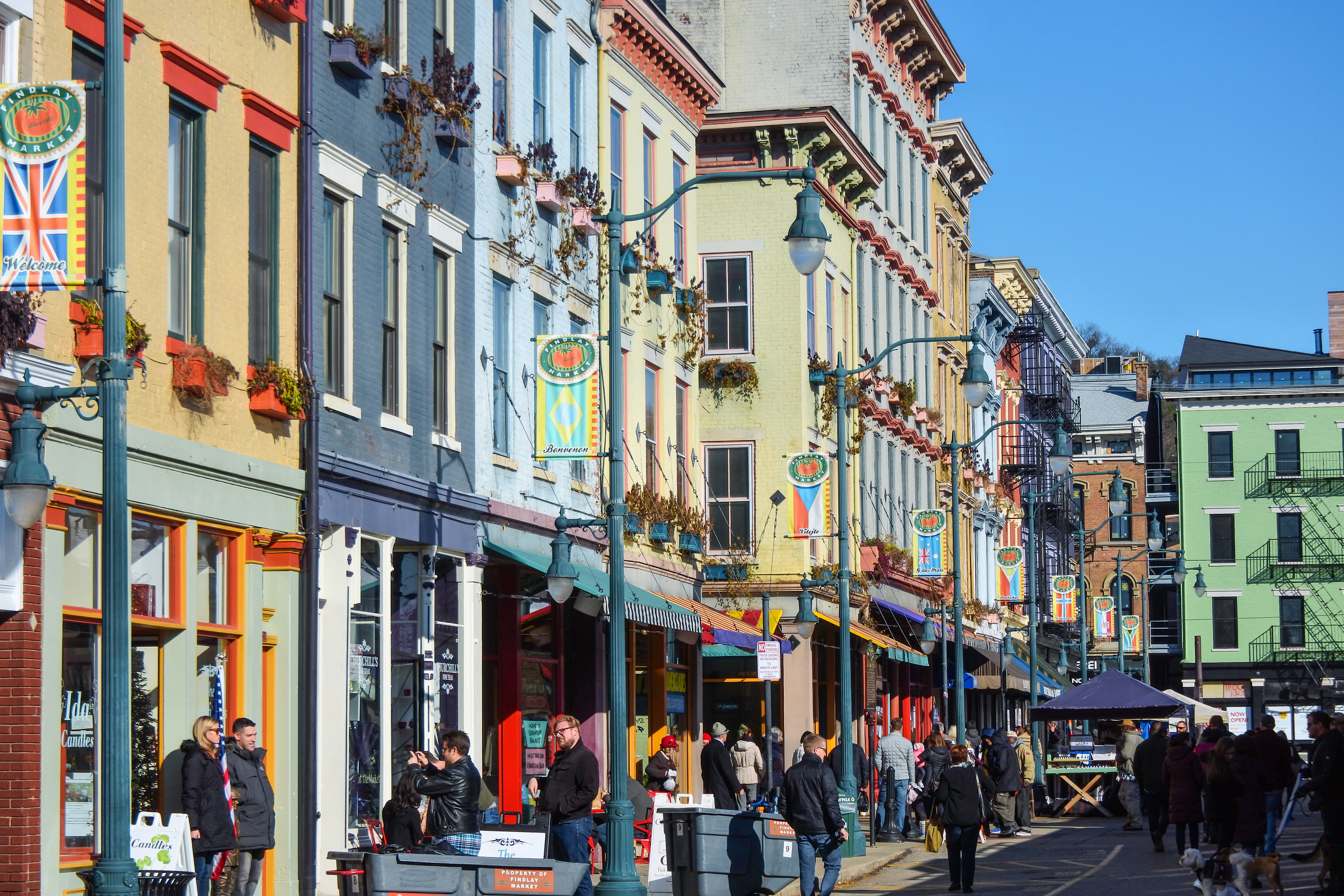
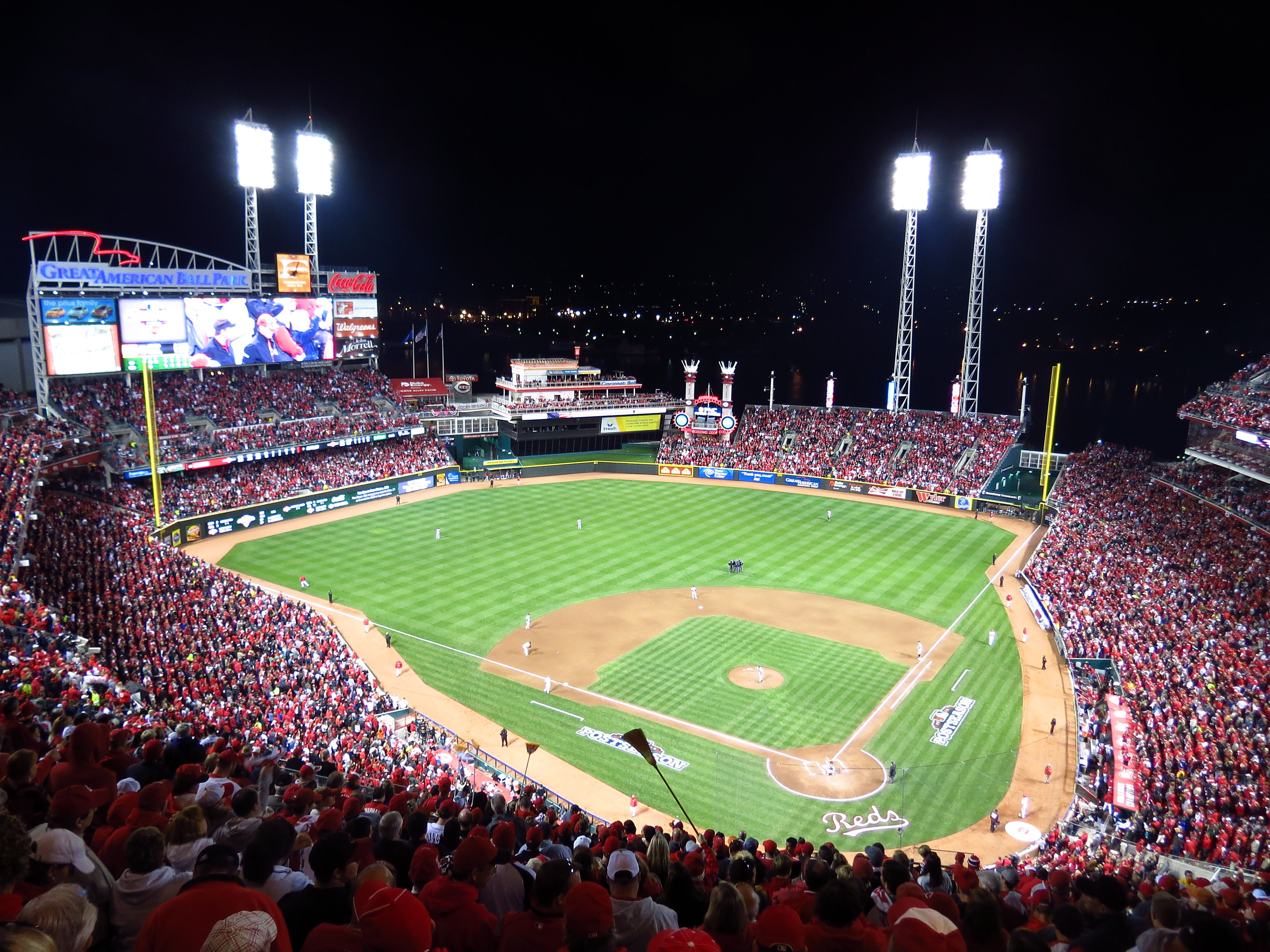
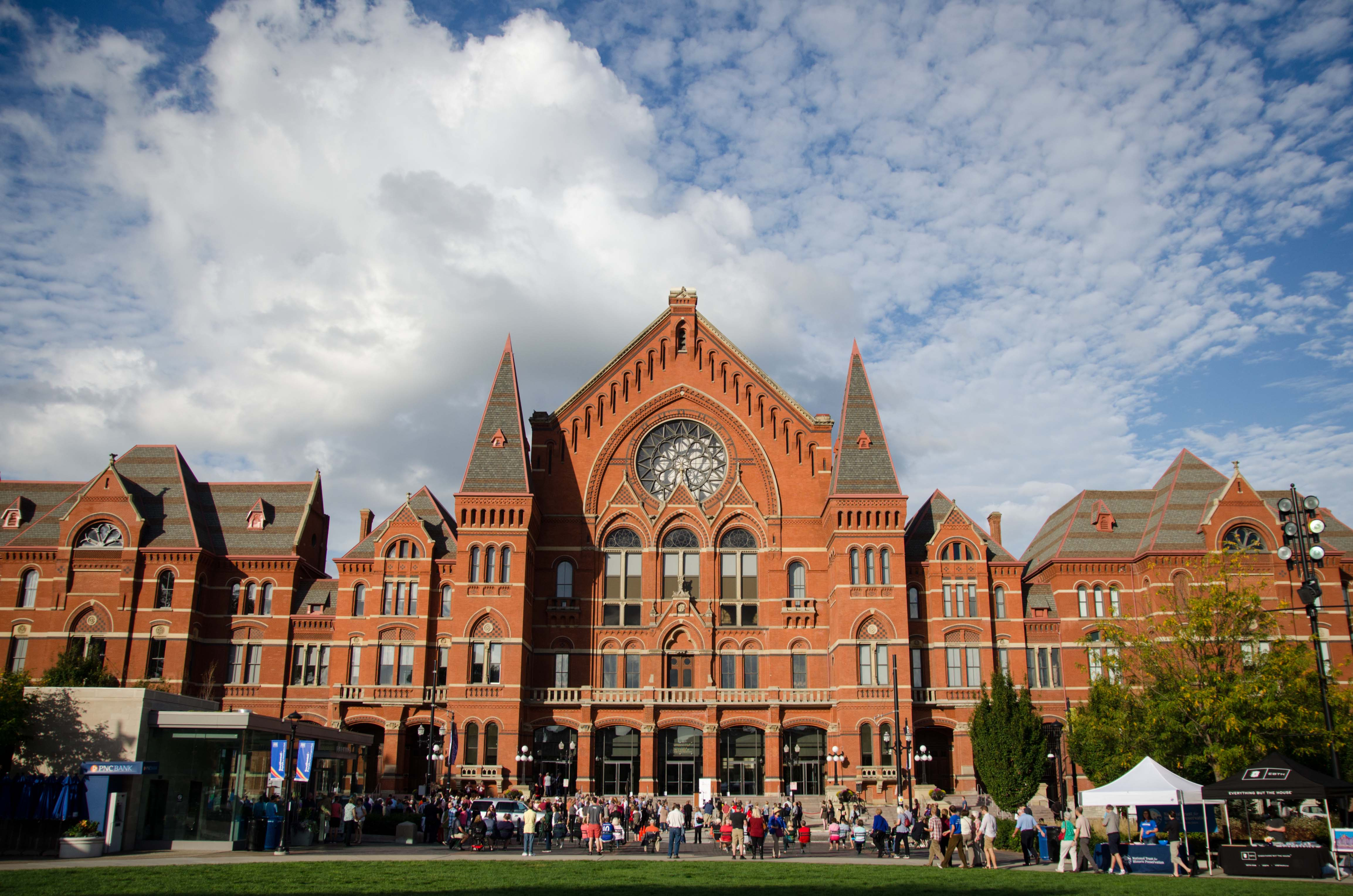
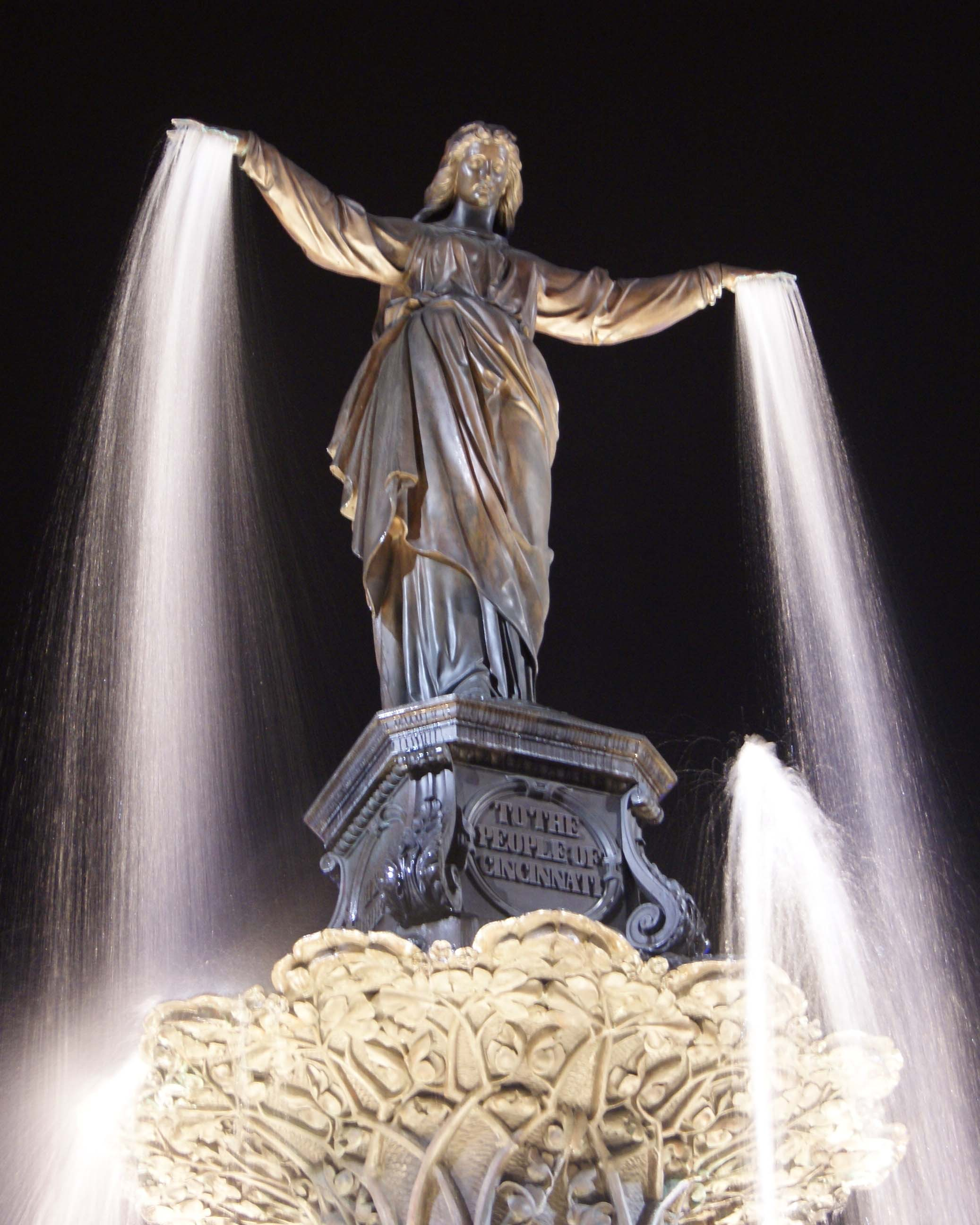
- Downtown Cincinnati skyline Roebling Bridge Union Terminal Over-the-Rhine Great American Ball Park Music Hall Tyler Davidson Fountain

- Flag Seal Logo
- Nicknames: Cincy, The Queen City, Paris of America, and others
- Motto: Juncta Juvant (Latin) "Strength in Unity"
- Interactive map of Cincinnati
- Location within Ohio Location within the United States Location within North America
- Coordinates: 39°06′00″N 84°30′45″W
- Country: United States
- State: Ohio
- County: Hamilton
- Settled: 1788; 238 years ago
- Incorporated (town): January 1, 1802; 224 years ago
- Incorporated (city): March 1, 1820; 206 years ago
- Named for: Society of the Cincinnati and Cincinnatus

Government
  - Type: Mayor–council
  - Body: Cincinnati City Council
  - Mayor: Aftab Pureval (D)
  - City manager: Sheryl Long

Area
  - City: 79.64 sq mi (206.26 km^{2})
  - Land: 77.92 sq mi (201.80 km^{2})
  - Water: 1.72 sq mi (4.46 km^{2})
  - Metro: 4,810 sq mi (12,450 km^{2})
- Elevation: 742 ft (226 m)

Population (2020)
  - City: 309,317
  - Estimate (2025): 314,367 ▲
  - Rank: US: 66th
  - Density: 3,970.0/sq mi (1,532.81/km^{2})
  - Urban: 1,686,744 (US: 33rd)
  - Urban density: 2,242/sq mi (865.7/km^{2})
  - Metro: 2,265,051 (US: 30th)
  - Demonym: Cincinnatian

GDP
  - Metro: $160.108 billion (2023)
  - Per capita: $70,686 (2023)
- Time zone: UTC−5 (EST)
  - Summer (DST): UTC−4 (EDT)
- ZIP Codes: 452XX, 45999: 45201–45209, 45211–45227, 45229-45255, 45258, 45262–45264, 45267–45271, 45273–45275, 45277, 45280, 45296, 45298–45299, 45999
- Area code: 513 and 283
- FIPS code: 39-15000
- GNIS feature ID: 1086201
- Website: cincinnati-oh.gov

Cincinnati (/ˌsɪnsɪˈnæti/ SIN-sin-AT-ee; colloquially nicknamed Cincy) is the most populous city in Hamilton County, Ohio, United States, and its county seat. It is located along the Ohio River across from its confluence with the Licking River in Kentucky. Cincinnati is the third-most populous city in Ohio (after Columbus and Cleveland), and the 66th-most populous city in the U.S., with a population of 309,317 at the 2020 census. The city serves as the economic and cultural hub of the tri-state Cincinnati metropolitan area, Ohio's most populous metropolitan area and the nation's 30th-largest, at over 2.3 million residents.

Settled in 1788, Cincinnati was among the top 10 U.S. cities by population throughout much of the 19th century. Located at the crossroads of the Northern and Southern United States, the city developed as an inland port for cargo shipping by steamboats; this location also made it a hub of Underground Railroad activity. Although it had fewer immigrants and thus less influence from Europe than major East Coast cities in the same period, it received a significant number of German-speaking immigrants, who founded many of the city's early cultural institutions. Cincinnati later developed a manufacturing industrial economy as railroads displaced river traffic in the 20th century.

Greater Cincinnati has the 28th-largest economy in the U.S. and the fifth-largest in the Midwest, and is home to Fortune 500 companies Kroger, Procter & Gamble, GE Aerospace, Western & Southern, Fifth Third Bank, Cincinnati Financial, Cintas, and American Financial Group. The region's economy encompasses consumer goods, retail, aerospace, financial services, and business services. Its institutions of higher education include the University of Cincinnati and Xavier University. Cincinnati is also the seat of the United States Court of Appeals for the Sixth Circuit.

Cincinnati is home to a range of cultural institutions and historic landmarks. Many structures in the urban core have remained intact for 200 years; in the late 19th century, Cincinnati was commonly referred to as the "Paris of America" due mainly to ambitious architectural projects such as Cincinnati Music Hall and the John A. Roebling Suspension Bridge. Other landmarks include the Cincinnati Art Museum, the Cincinnati Museum Center housed within Union Terminal, and the National Underground Railroad Freedom Center. It is also known for Cincinnati chili. The city's major league professional sports teams include the Cincinnati Bengals (NFL), Cincinnati Reds (MLB), and FC Cincinnati (MLS).

== History ==
=== Etymology and nicknames ===
Two years after the founding of the settlement then known as "Losantiville", Arthur St. Clair, the governor of the Northwest Territory, changed its name to "Cincinnati", possibly at the suggestion of the surveyor Israel Ludlow. The name was chosen in honor of the Society of the Cincinnati, made up of Continental Army officers of the Revolutionary War, of which St. Clair was then president. The society, in turn, was named for Lucius Quinctius Cincinnatus, a dictator of the early Roman Republic who saved Rome from a crisis and then retired to farming because he did not want to remain in power, becoming a symbol of Roman civic virtue. (Note: Cincinnati's connection with Rome still exists today through its nickname of "The City of Seven Hills" (a phrase commonly associated with Rome) and the town twinning program of Sister Cities International.)

Cincinnati has many nicknames, including Cincy (or Cinci), the Queen City or Queen City of the West, the Blue Chip City, the City of Seven Hills, and Porkopolis. The traditional Queen City nickname is taken from an 1819 newspaper article and further immortalized by the 1854 poem "Catawba Wine". In it, Henry Wadsworth Longfellow wrote of the city:

And this Song of the Vine,
This greeting of mine,
The winds and the birds shall deliver,
To the Queen of the West,
In her garlands dressed,
On the banks of the Beautiful River.

For many years, Cincinnati was known as "Porkopolis" after the prominence of the pork processing and sales industry in the city. In 1988, the city built a park, Bicentennial Commons, to celebrate the 200th anniversary of the city's founding and commissioned British artist Andrew Leicester to create a sculpture for the entrance. Leicester came up with four steamboat smokestacks, a nod to the city's riverboat history, each topped with a winged pig. Initial reaction was derision, but the city soon embraced the "Flying Pigs"; the city's Flying Pig Marathon was named after them, and the city's Big Pig Gig inspired by them. The city has used it as a symbol and a brand.

One nickname, the City of Seven Hills, stems from the June 1853 edition of the West American Review, "Article III—Cincinnati: Its Relations to the West and South", which described and named seven specific hills. The hills form a crescent around the city: Mount Adams, Walnut Hills, Mount Auburn, Vine Street Hill, College Hill, Fairmont (now rendered Fairmount), and Mount Harrison (now known as Price Hill). The name refers to the Seven hills of Rome. Newer nicknames such as "The 'Nati" are emerging and are attempted to be used in different cultural contexts. For example, the local Keep America Beautiful affiliate, Keep Cincinnati Beautiful, introduced the catchphrase "Don't Trash the 'Nati" in 1998 as part of a litter-prevention campaign.

=== Early history ===
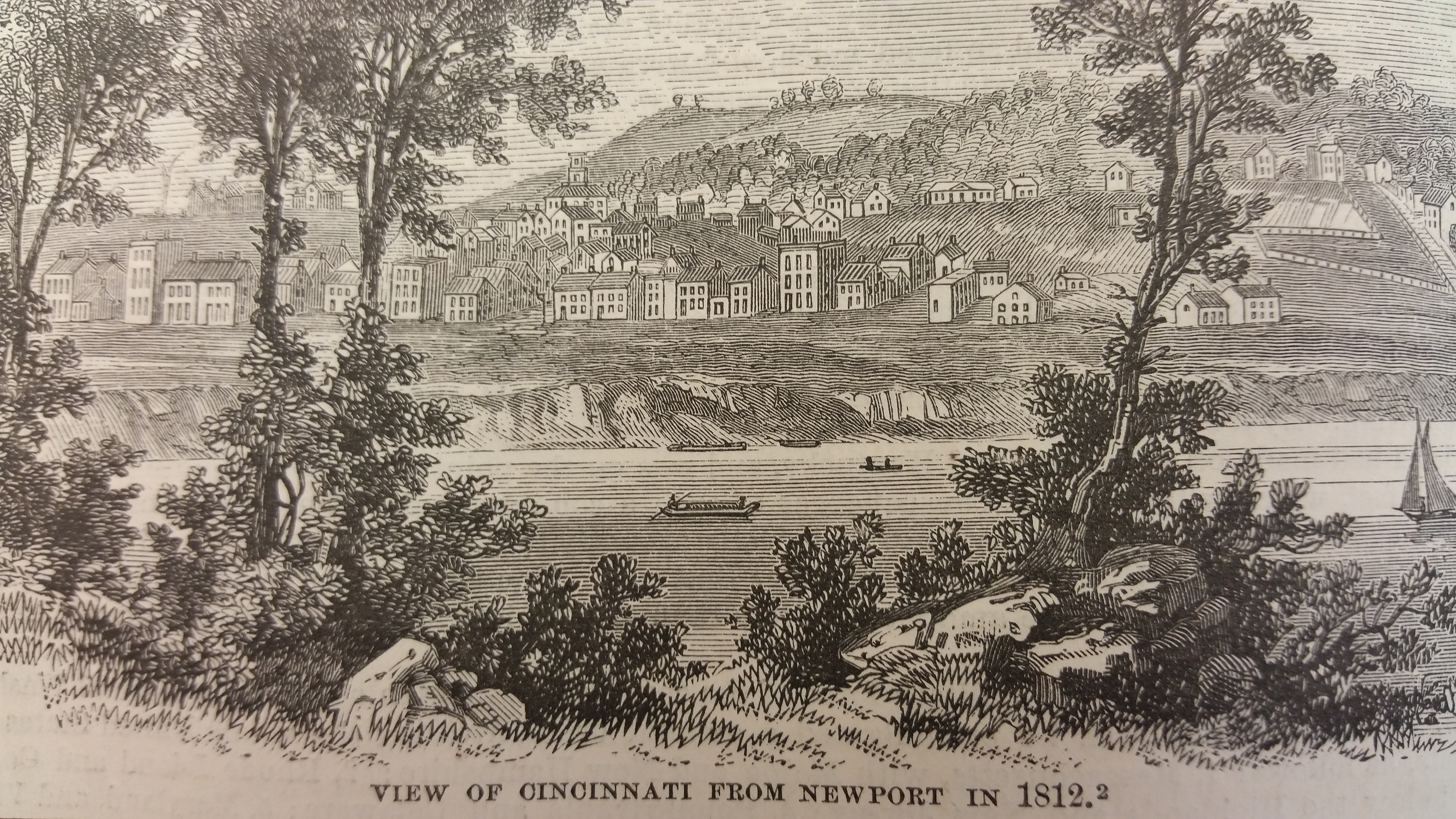
Cincinnati as depicted in 1812 with a population of 2,000

Cincinnati was founded in 1788, when Mathias Denman, Colonel Robert Patterson, and Israel Ludlow landed at a spot at the northern bank of the Ohio opposite the mouth of the Licking River and decided to settle there. The original surveyor, John Filson, named it "Losantiville", a combination of syllables drawn from French and Latin words, intended to mean "town opposite the mouth of the Licking". In 1789, Fort Washington was established in the town and became the major staging place and conduit for settlers, troops and supplies during the settlement of the Northwest Territory. Governor Arthur St. Clair changed the name of the settlement to honor the Society of the Cincinnati on January 4, 1790.

In 1811, the introduction of steamboats on the Ohio River opened up the city's trade to more rapid shipping, and the city established commercial ties with the ports of St. Louis and New Orleans downriver. Cincinnati was incorporated as a city on March 1, 1819. Exporting pork products and hay, it became a center of pork processing in the region. From 1810 to 1830, the city's population nearly tripled, from 9,642 to 24,831.

Construction on the Miami and Erie Canal began on July 21, 1825, when it was called the Miami Canal, related to its origin at the Great Miami River. The first section of the canal was opened for business in 1827. In 1827, the canal connected Cincinnati to nearby Middletown; by 1840, it had reached Toledo on Lake Erie. Railroads were the next major form of commercial transportation to come to Cincinnati. In 1836, the Little Miami Railroad was chartered. Construction began soon after, to connect Cincinnati with the Mad River and Lake Erie Railroad, and provide access to the ports of the Sandusky Bay on Lake Erie.

Residents of Cincinnati played a major role in abolitionism. Many fugitive slaves used the Ohio River at Cincinnati to escape to the North. Cincinnati had numerous stations on the Underground Railroad, but there were also runaway slave catchers active in the city, who put escaping slaves at risk of recapture. Given its southern Ohio location, Cincinnati had also attracted settlers from the Upper South who traveled along the Ohio River into the territory. Tensions between abolitionists and supporters of slavery broke out in repeated violence, with whites attacking black people in 1829 in a wave of destruction that resulted in 1,200 black people leaving for Canada. The riot and its refugees became topics of discussion throughout the country, and black people organized the first Negro Convention in 1830 in Philadelphia to discuss these events.

White riots against black people took place again in Cincinnati in 1836 and in 1842. In 1836 a mob of 700 pro-slavery men attacked black neighborhoods and a press run by James M. Birney, publisher of the anti-slavery weekly The Philanthropist. Tensions increased after congressional passage in 1850 of the Fugitive Slave Act, which required cooperation by citizens in free states and increased penalties for failing to try to recapture escaped slaves. Abolitionist Levi Coffin made the Cincinnati area the center of his anti-slavery efforts in 1847. Harriet Beecher Stowe lived in Cincinnati for a time, where she met escaped slaves and used their stories as a basis for her novel Uncle Tom's Cabin (1852), which was crucial in galvanizing public support for the abolitionist cause.

The city had a labor shortage until large waves of immigration from Ireland and Germany in the late 1840s. The city grew rapidly over the next two decades, reaching 115,000 people by 1850. During this period of rapid expansion and prominence, residents of Cincinnati began referring to the city as the Queen City.

=== Industrial development and Gilded Age ===
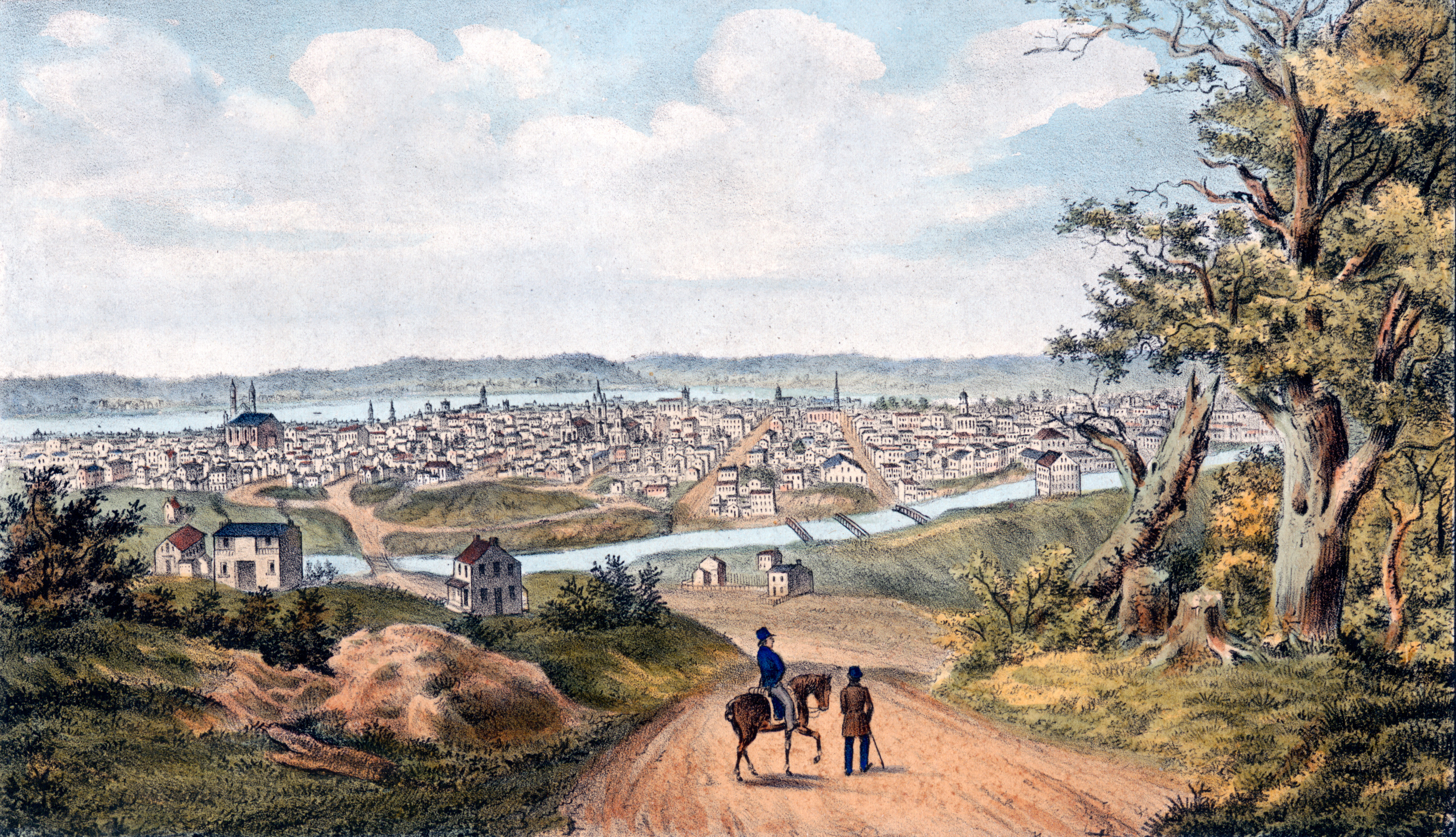
Cincinnati in 1841 with the Miami and Erie Canal in the foreground

Cincinnati's location, on the border between the free state of Ohio and the slave state of Kentucky, made it a prominent location for slaves to escape the South. Many prominent abolitionists also called Cincinnati their home during this period, and made it a popular stop on the Underground Railroad. In 2004, the National Underground Railroad Freedom Center was completed along Freedom Way in downtown Cincinnati, honoring the city's involvement in the Underground Railroad.

In 1859, Cincinnati laid out six horsecar lines. By 1872, Cincinnatians could travel on the streetcars within the city and transfer to rail cars for travel to the hill communities. The Cincinnati Inclined Plane Company began transporting people to the top of Mount Auburn via funicular that year. In 1889, the Cincinnati streetcar system began converting its horse-drawn cars to electric streetcars.

The Second Annual Meeting of the Woman's Christian Temperance Union was held in Cincinnati in November 1875.

In 1880, the city government completed the Cincinnati Southern Railway to Chattanooga, Tennessee. It was the only municipally owned interstate railway in the United States until its sale to Norfolk Southern in March 2024.

In 1884, outrage over a manslaughter verdict in what many observers thought was a clear case of murder triggered the Courthouse riots, one of the most destructive riots in American history. Over the course of three days, 56 people were killed and over 300 were injured. The riots ended the dominance of Republican political boss Thomas C. Campbell.

=== 20th century ===
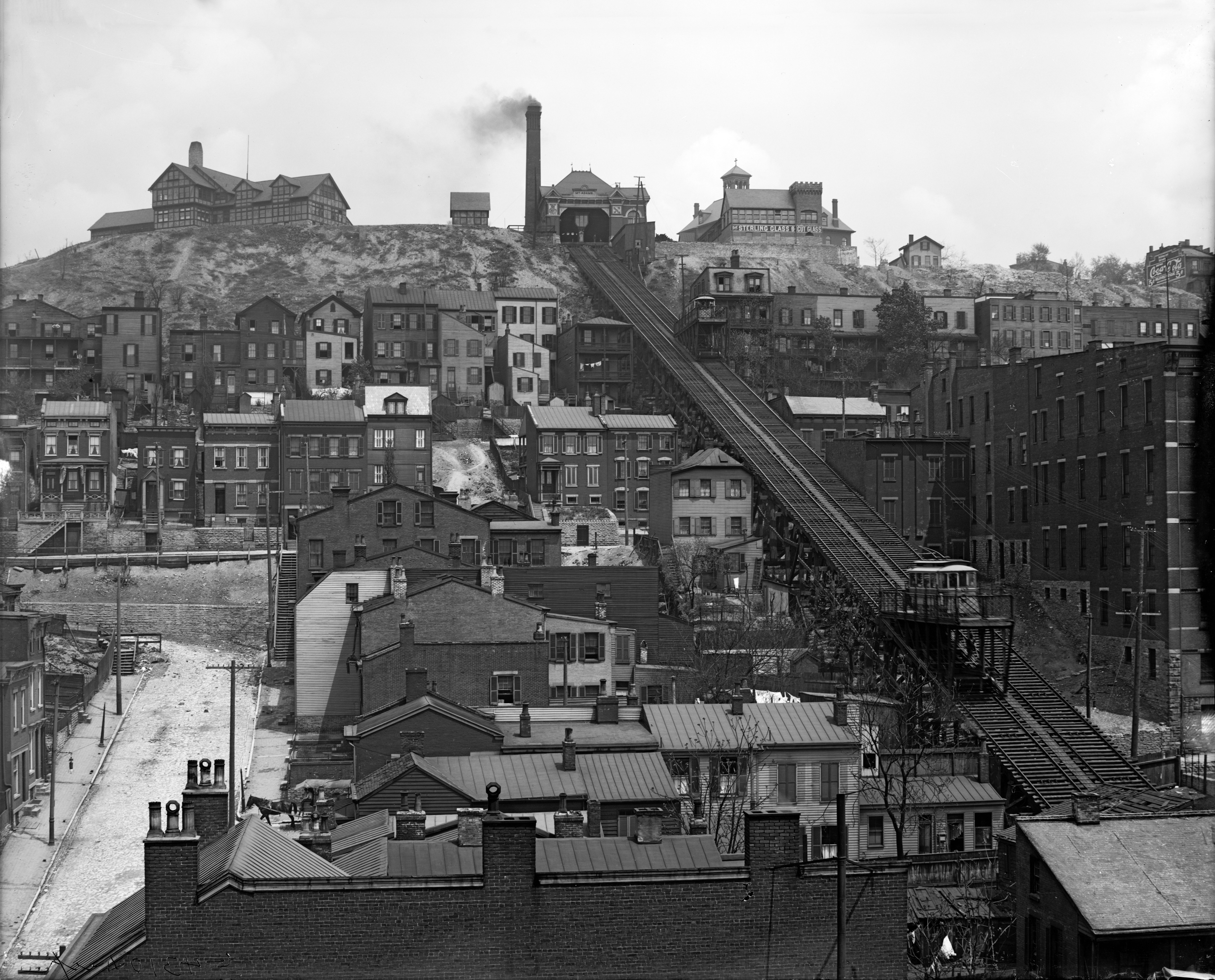
Mount Adams Incline c. 1905

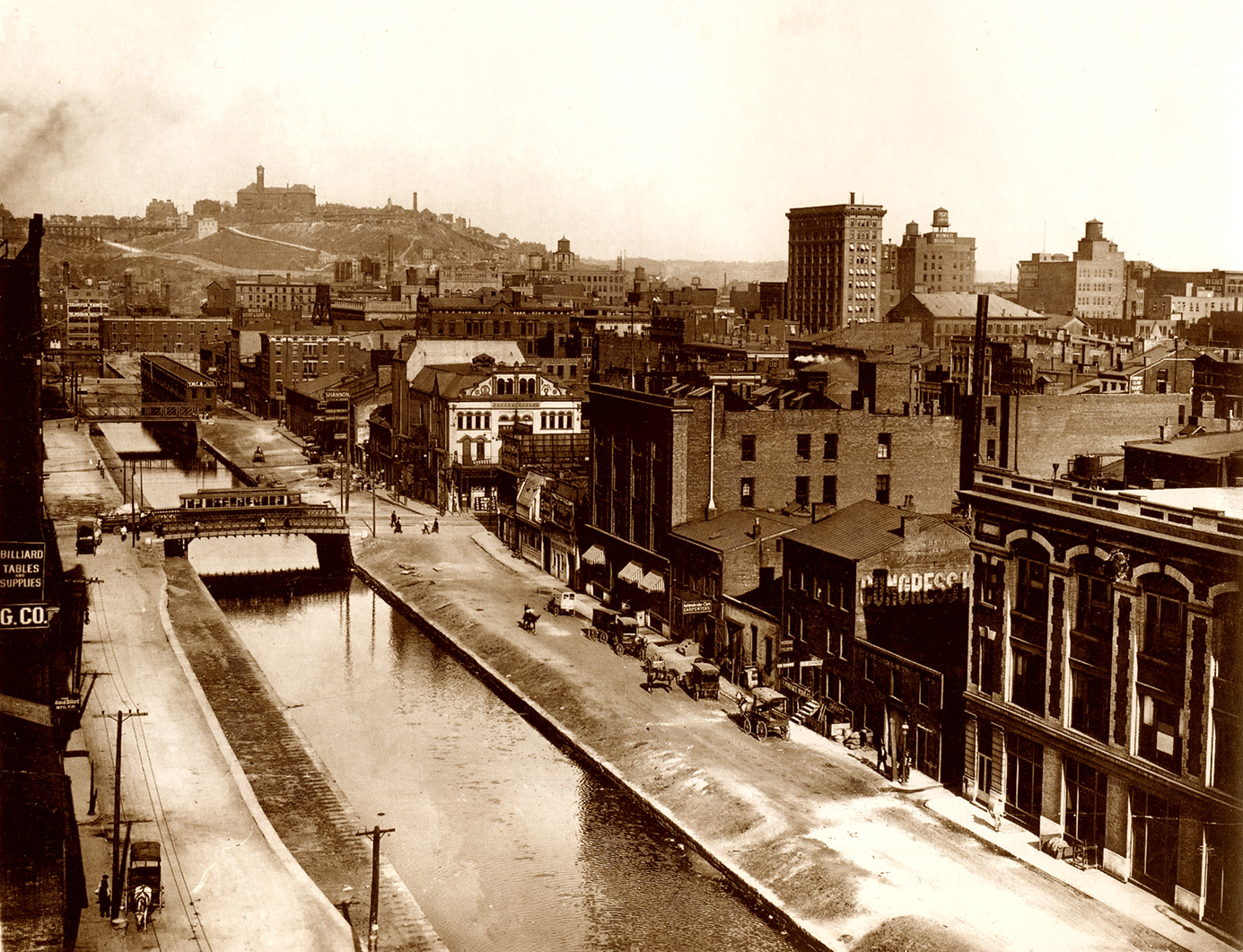
Over-the-Rhine in 1914

At the beginning of the 20th century, Cincinnati had a population of 325,902. The city completed many ambitious projects in the 20th century, starting with the Ingalls Building, which was completed in 1903. An early rejuvenation of downtown began into the 1920s and continued into the next decade with the construction of Cincinnati Union Terminal, the United States Courthouse and Post Office, and the Carew Tower, which was the city's tallest building upon its completion. A subway system was planned but abandoned fairly early in its delayed construction due to shortages caused by World War I, escalating costs, and the onset of the Great Depression. Cincinnati managed through the Depression better than most American cities of its size, largely due to a resurgence in river trade, which was less expensive than transporting goods by rail. The Ohio River flood of 1937 was one of the worst in the nation's history and destroyed many areas along the Ohio valley. Afterward the city built protective flood walls.

After World War II, Cincinnati unveiled a master plan for urban renewal that resulted in modernization of the inner city. During the 1950s, Cincinnati's population peaked at 509,998. Since the 1950s, $250 million has been spent on improving neighborhoods, building low- and moderate-income housing, providing jobs, and stimulating economic growth. Predominantly white, working-class families who constituted the urban core during the European immigration boom in the 19th and early 20th centuries quickly moved to newly constructed suburbs before and after World War II. Black people, fleeing the oppression of the Jim Crow South in hopes of better socioeconomic opportunity, had moved to these older city neighborhoods in their Great Migration to the industrial North. The downturn in industry in the late 20th century caused a loss of many jobs, leaving many people in poverty and homeless.

The Avondale riot of 1967 followed years of police abuse and deteriorating living conditions in the poor black community of Avondale. The riots followed the disputed June 1967 conviction of Posteal Laskey Jr., accused of being the Cincinnati Strangler. Crowds filled the streets and threw bottles and firebombs at businesses. The Avondale riot of 1968 broke out after the assassination of civil rights leader Martin Luther King Jr. in April. A mob smashed store windows and looted the stores or burned the merchandise. One person died and 404 were arrested following the 1967 riot. Two people were killed, at least 220 injured and 260 arrested during the 1968 riot. Later in 1968, President Lyndon B. Johnson's Commission on Civil Disorders issued a report that blamed the riots on the poverty of the segregated neighborhoods in Cincinnati and the practice of police officers in "stopping Negroes on foot or in cars without obvious basis" and using loitering laws disproportionately against minorities.

=== 21st century to present ===
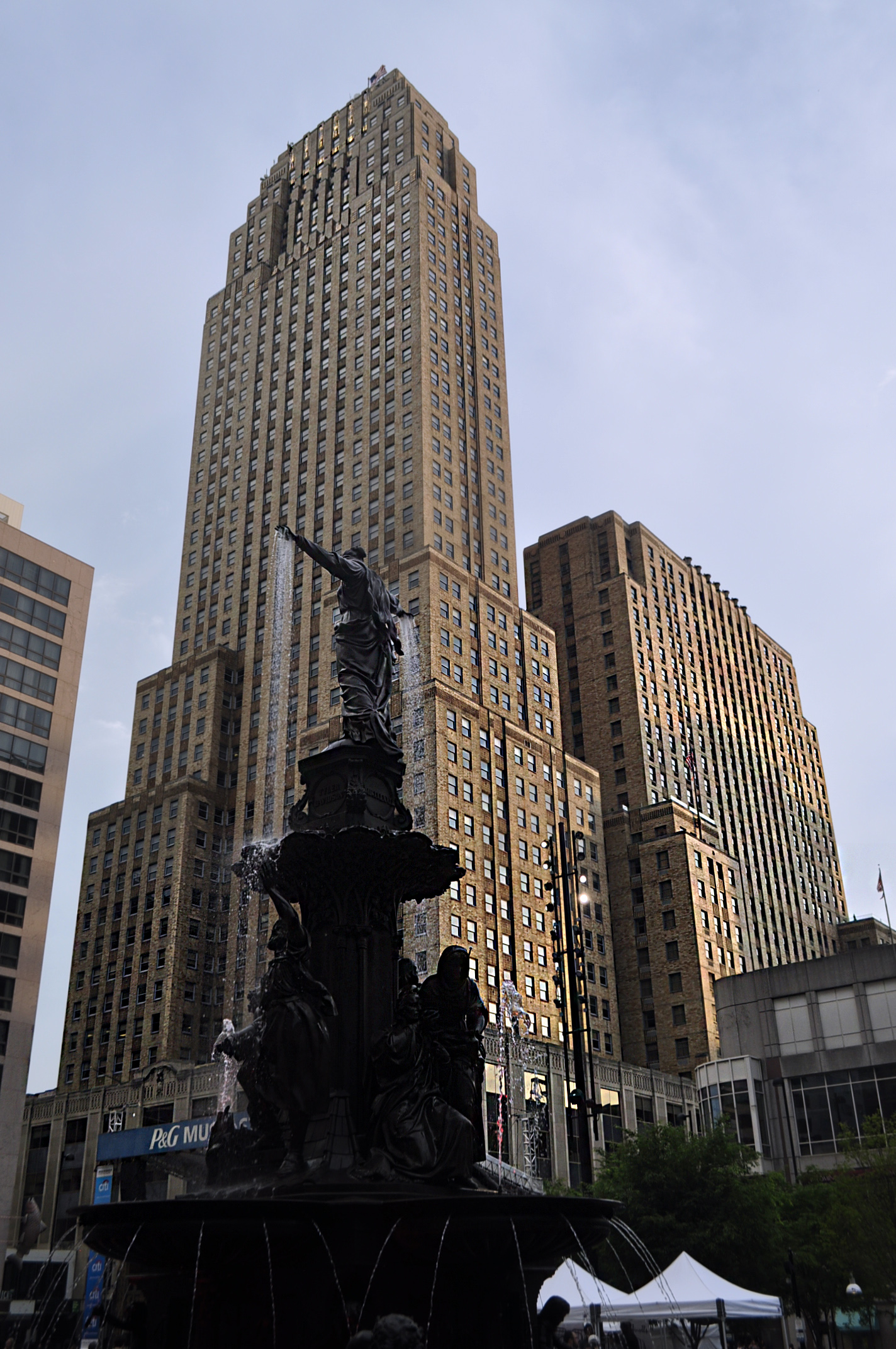
Carew Tower, the city's second-tallest building, and The Genius of Water, a symbol of Cincinnati

Paycor Stadium (home of the Cincinnati Bengals) opened in 2000, and Great American Ball Park (home of the Cincinnati Reds) opened in 2003, both funded by a sales tax increase in Hamilton County passed in 1996.

In April 2001, race riots occurred in the Over-the-Rhine neighborhood after police fatally shot a young unarmed black man, Timothy Thomas, during a foot pursuit to arrest him, mostly for outstanding traffic warrants. After the 2001 riots, the American Civil Liberties Union, Cincinnati Black United Front, the city and its police union agreed upon a more community-oriented policing strategy. The agreement has been used as a model across the country for building law enforcement-based relationships between local communities and police. Subsequently, substantial transformations unfolded, particularly the gentrification of Over-the-Rhine.

In 2015, unarmed black motorist Samuel DuBose was fatally shot by white University of Cincinnati police officer Ray Tensing after a routine traffic stop. The resulting legal proceedings in late 2016 became a recurring focus of national news media. Several protests involving the Black Lives Matter movement were carried out.

In 2018, Major League Soccer announced the inclusion of FC Cincinnati, becoming the city's third professional sports team. TQL Stadium, located on Cincinnati's west end, was subsequently constructed and opened its doors in 2021. The 2020 census revealed that Cincinnati had witnessed population growth for the first time since the 1950 census. In 2022, Aftab Pureval assumed office as the 70th mayor of Cincinnati and became the city's first Asian-American mayor.

In the 2020s, major urban development in Cincinnati has continued to center on Downtown and Over-the-Rhine. In the Convention District, projects have included Elm Street Plaza, a $264 million renovation of the convention center—which reopened in January 2026 as the First Financial Center—and ground breaking on a 700-room convention headquarters hotel scheduled to open in late 2028. Downtown residential conversions and private investment have added more than 1,600 apartments across over $500 million in projects since 2020, alongside building rehabilitations and housing projects in Over-the-Rhine, including north of Liberty Street.

== Geography ==
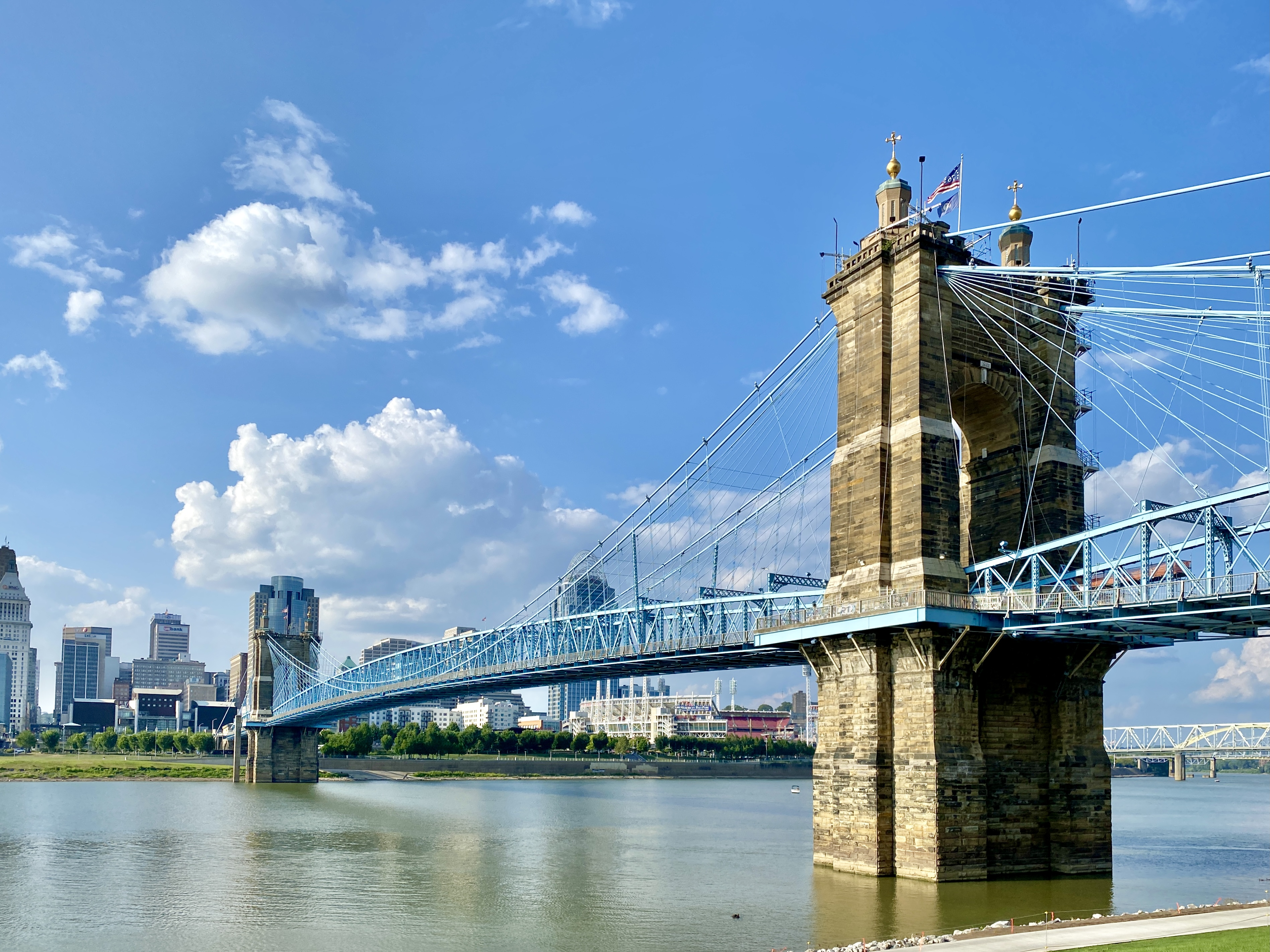
The John A. Roebling Suspension Bridge opened in 1867 and spans the Ohio River between Cincinnati and Covington, Kentucky.

Cincinnati is midway by river between the cities of Pittsburgh, Pennsylvania, and Cairo, Illinois. The downtown lies near the mouth of the Licking River, a confluence where the first settlement occurred. Greater Cincinnati spans southern Ohio, southeastern Indiana, and northern Kentucky; the United States Census Bureau has measured the city proper at 79.54 square miles (206.01 km^{2}), of which 77.94 square miles (201.86 km^{2}) are land and 1.60 square miles (4.14 km^{2}) are water. The city spreads over a number of hills, bluffs, and low ridges overlooking the Ohio in the Bluegrass region of the country. The tristate is geographically located within the Midwest at the far northern extremity of the Upland South.

The city is undergoing significant changes due to new development and private investment. This includes buildings of the Banks project that includes apartments, retail, restaurants, and offices, which stretches from Great American Ball Park to Paycor Stadium. The buildings are 100 percent occupied as of early 2013. Smale Riverfront Park was developed along with The Banks, and was Cincinnati's newest park. Nearly $3.5 billion had been invested in the urban core of Cincinnati (including Northern Kentucky). Much of this development has been undertaken by 3CDC. The Cincinnati Bell Connector began in September 2016.

Three municipalities are enclaves of the city: Norwood, Elmwood Place, and Saint Bernard. Norwood is a business and industrial city, while Elmwood Place and Saint Bernard are small, primarily residential, villages. Cincinnati does not have an exclave, but the city government does own several properties outside the corporation limits: French Park in Amberley Village and the disused runway at the former Blue Ash Airport in Blue Ash.

=== Cityscape ===
Cincinnati has many landmarks across its area. Some of these landmarks are recognized nationwide, others are more recognized among locals. These landmarks include Cincinnati Union Terminal, Carew Tower, Queen City Square, Fountain Square, Washington Park, and Great American Ball Park.

Cincinnati is home to numerous structures that are noteworthy due to their architectural characteristics or historic associations, including the aforementioned Carew Tower, the Scripps Center, the Ingalls Building, Cincinnati Union Terminal, and the Isaac M. Wise Temple. Queen City Square opened in January 2011. The building is the tallest in Cincinnati and the third tallest in Ohio, reaching a height of 665 feet (203 m).

Since April 1, 1922, the Ohio flood stage at Cincinnati has officially been set at 52 feet (16 m), as measured from the John A. Roebling Suspension Bridge. At this depth, the pumping station at the mouth of Mill Creek is activated. From 1873 to 1898, the flood stage was 45 feet (14 m). From 1899 to March 31, 1922, it was 50 feet (15 m). The Ohio reached its lowest level, less than 2 feet (0.61 m), in 1881; conversely, its all-time high water mark is 79 feet 11 7/8 inches (24.381 m), having crested January 26, 1937.

Parts of Cincinnati flood at different points: Riverbend Music Center in the California neighborhood floods at 42 feet (13 m), while Sayler Park floods at 71 feet (22 m) and the Freeman Avenue flood gate closes at 75 feet (23 m). Frequent flooding has hampered the growth of Cincinnati's municipal airport at Lunken Field and the Coney Island amusement park. Downtown Cincinnati is protected from flooding by the Serpentine Wall at Yeatman's Cove and another flood wall built into Fort Washington Way. Parts of Cincinnati also experience flooding from the Little Miami River and Mill Creek.

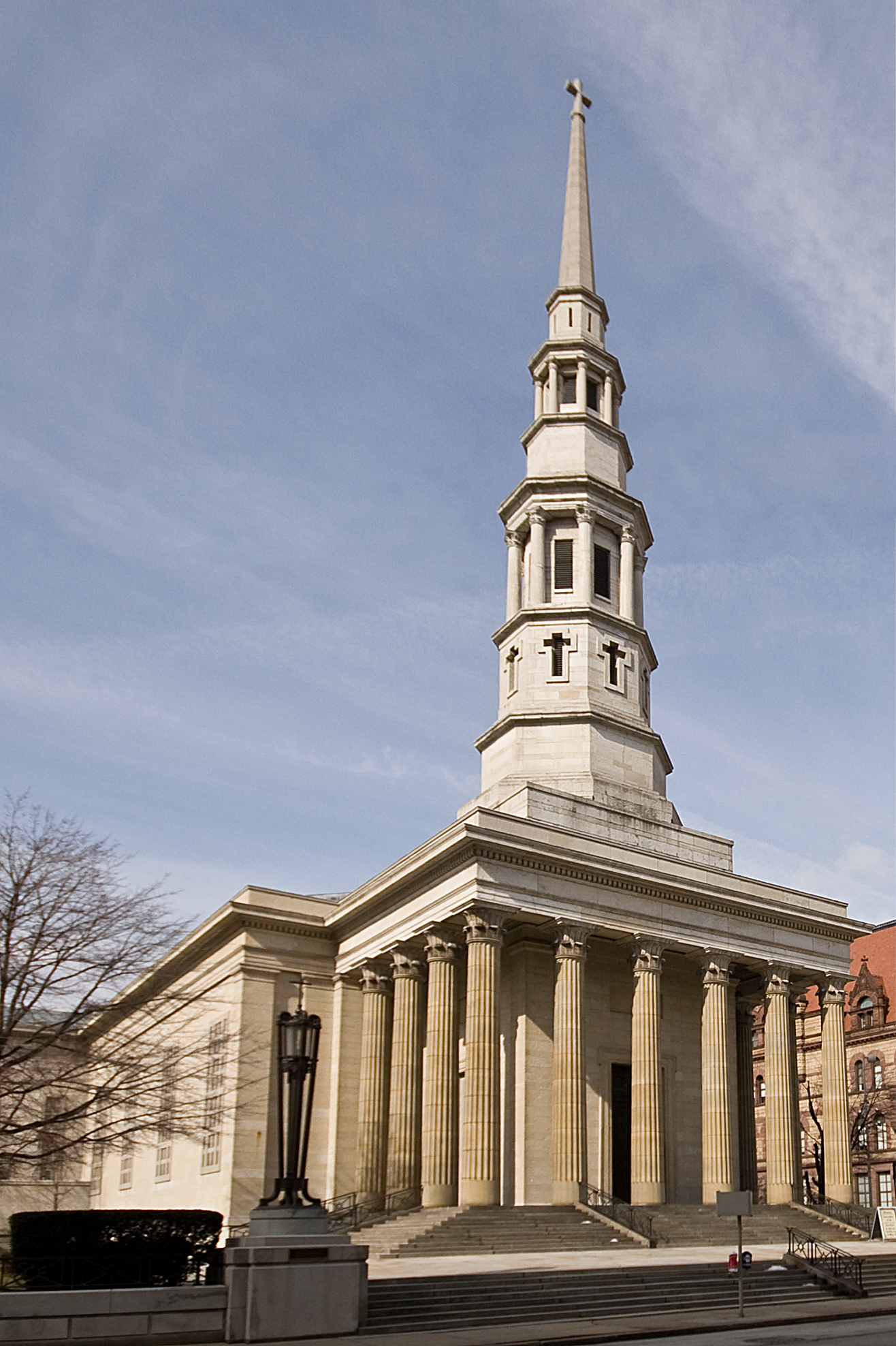
Cathedral Basilica of St. Peter in Chains (1845)

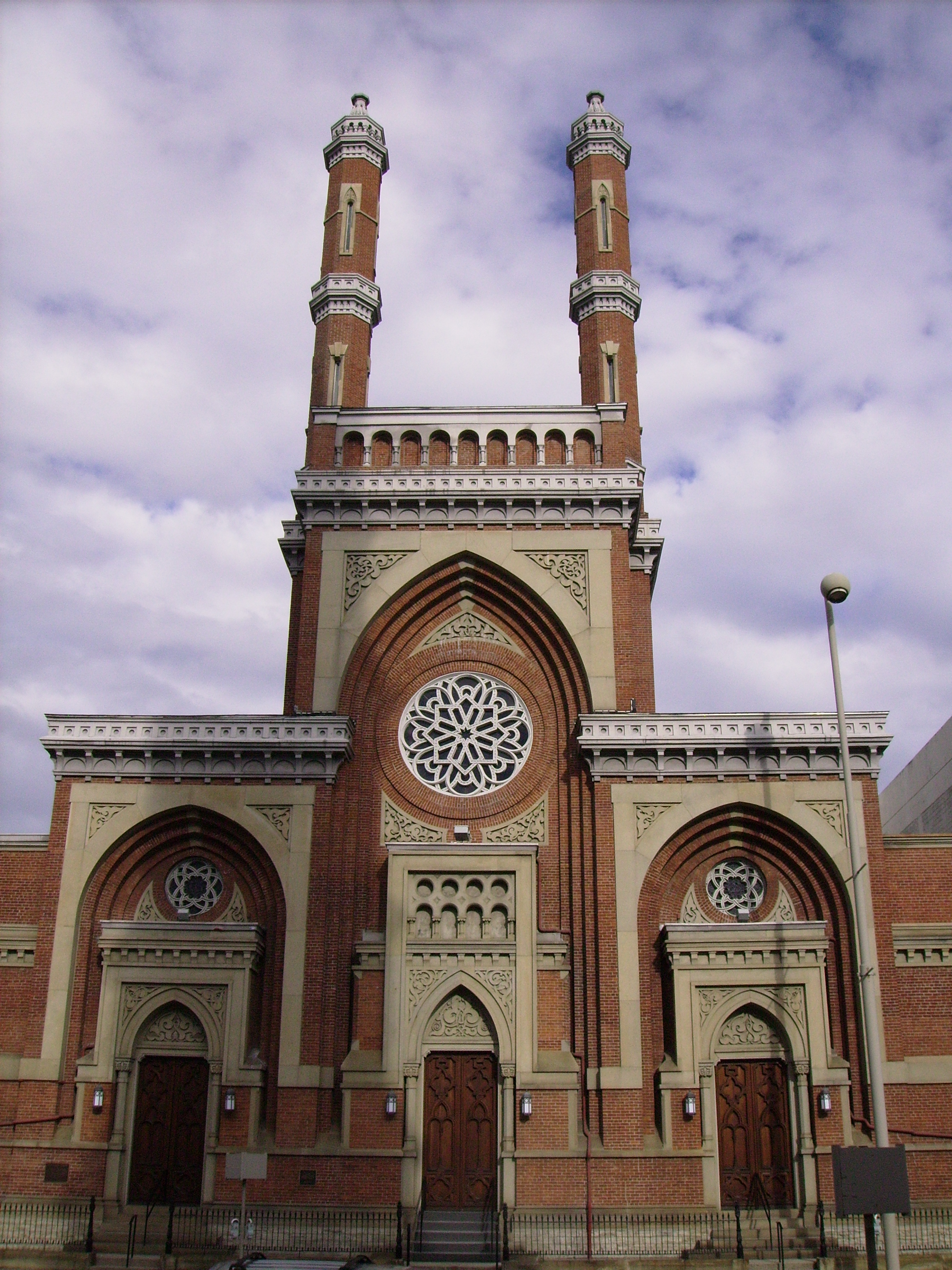
Isaac M. Wise Temple (1866)

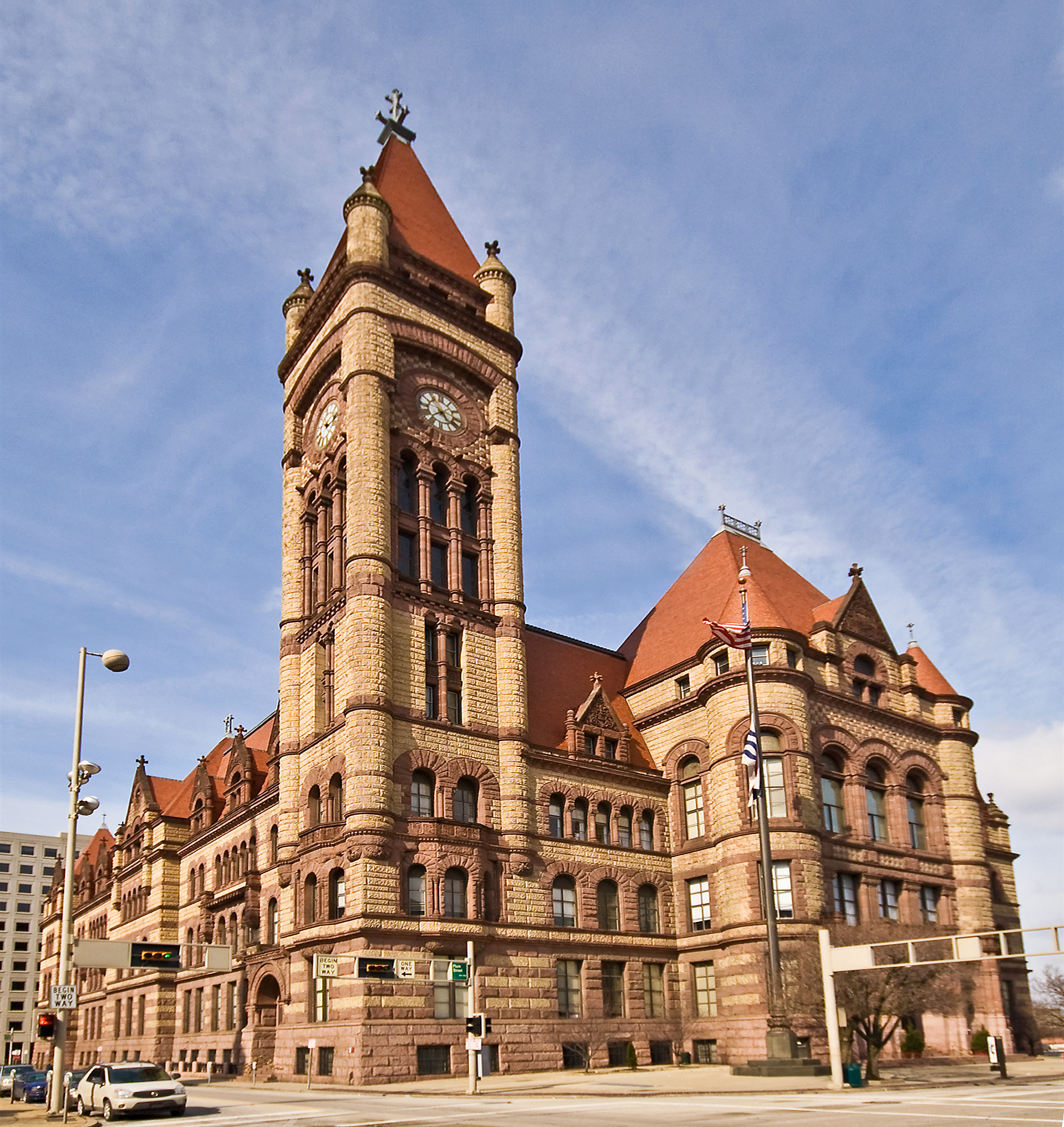
Cincinnati City Hall (1893)

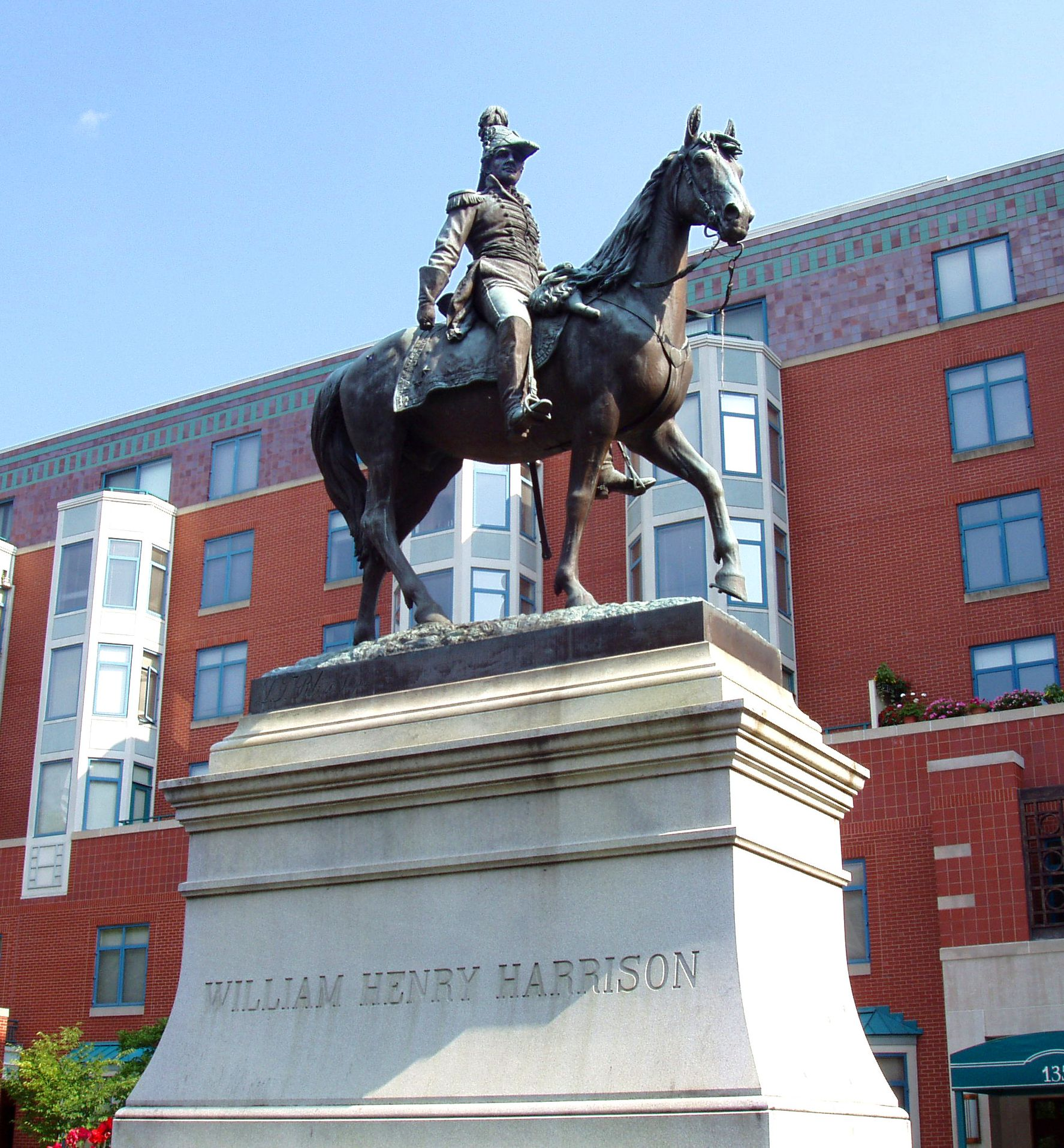
Equestrian statue of William Henry Harrison (1896)

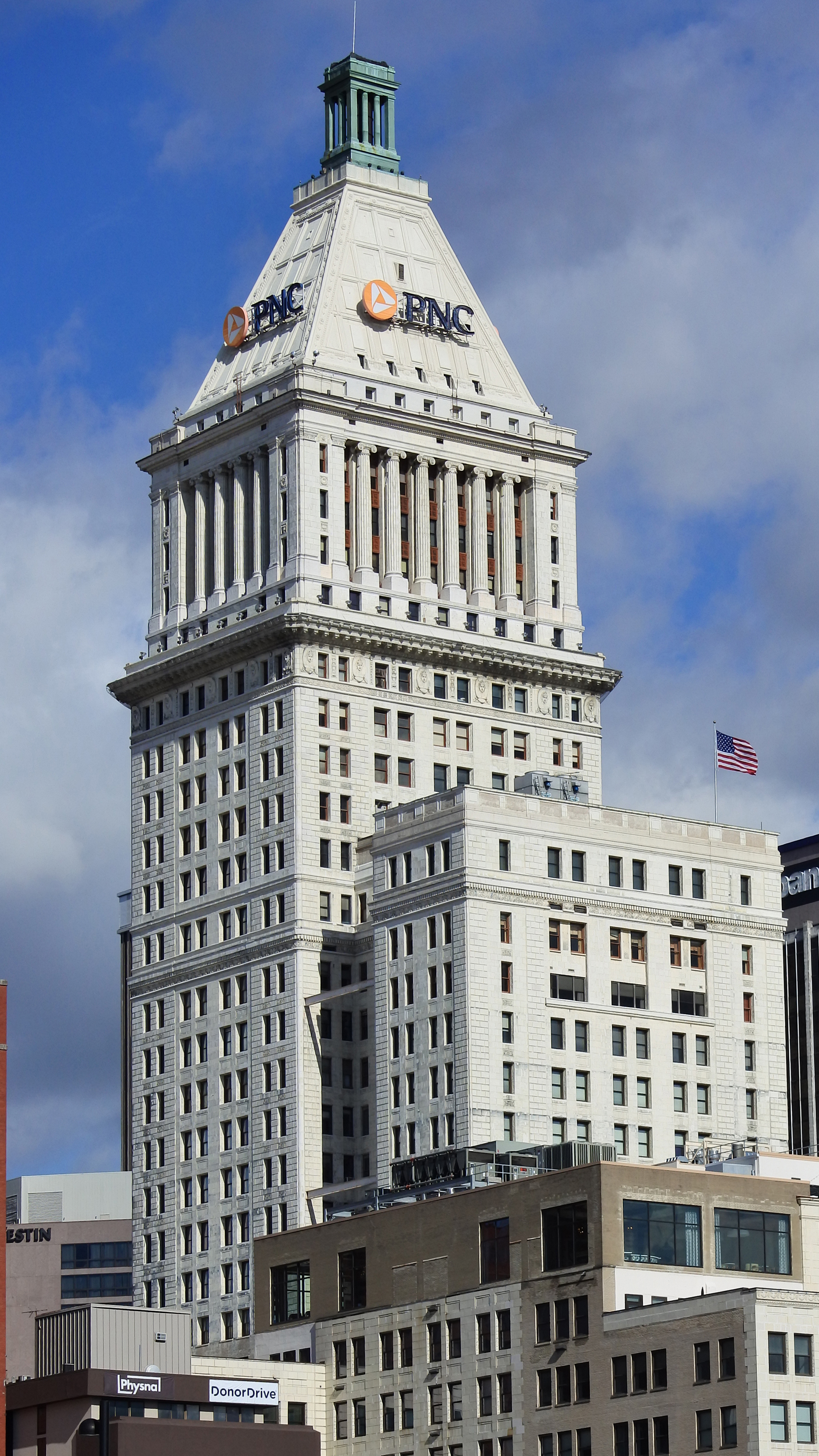
Fourth and Vine Tower (1913)

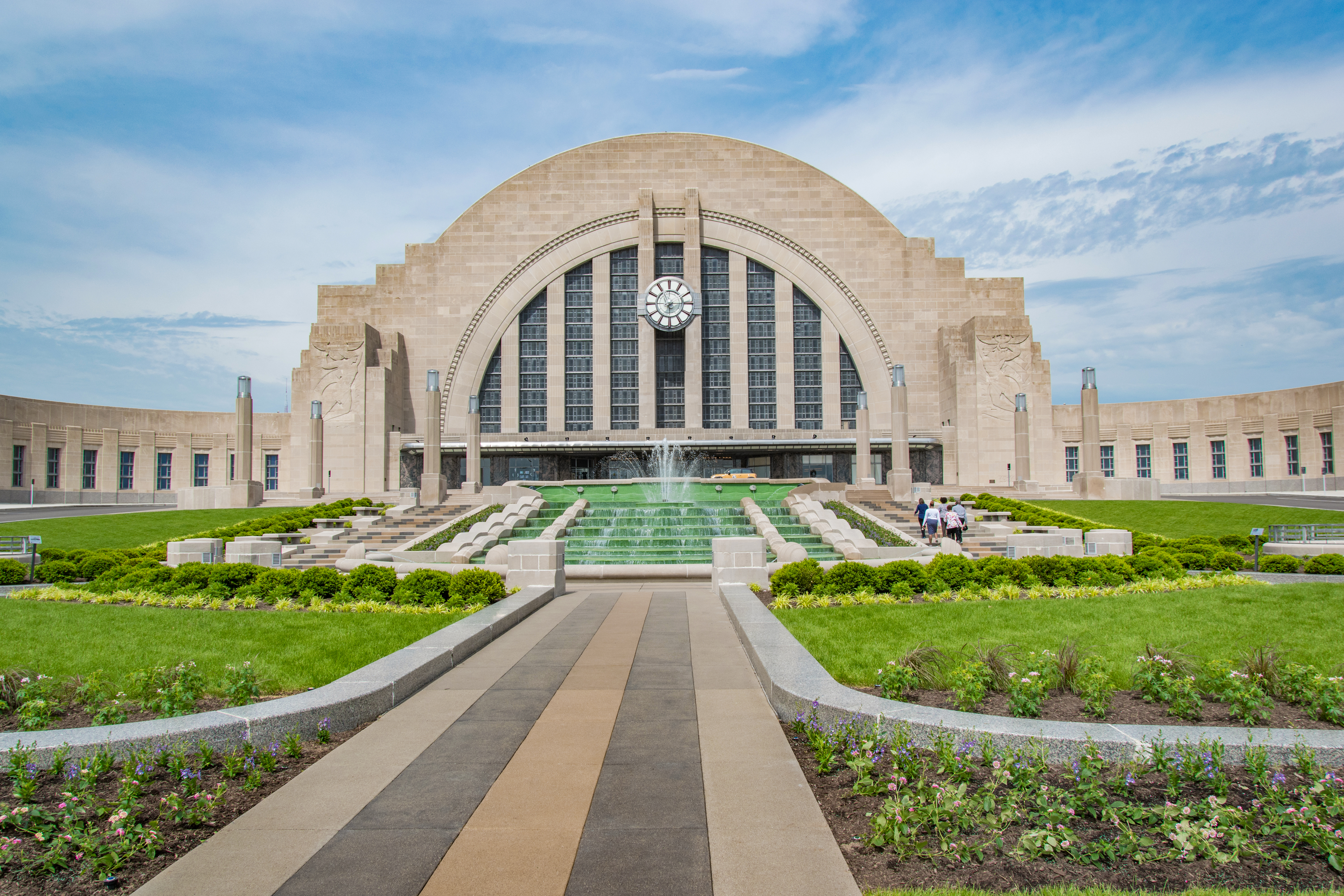
Cincinnati Union Terminal (1933)

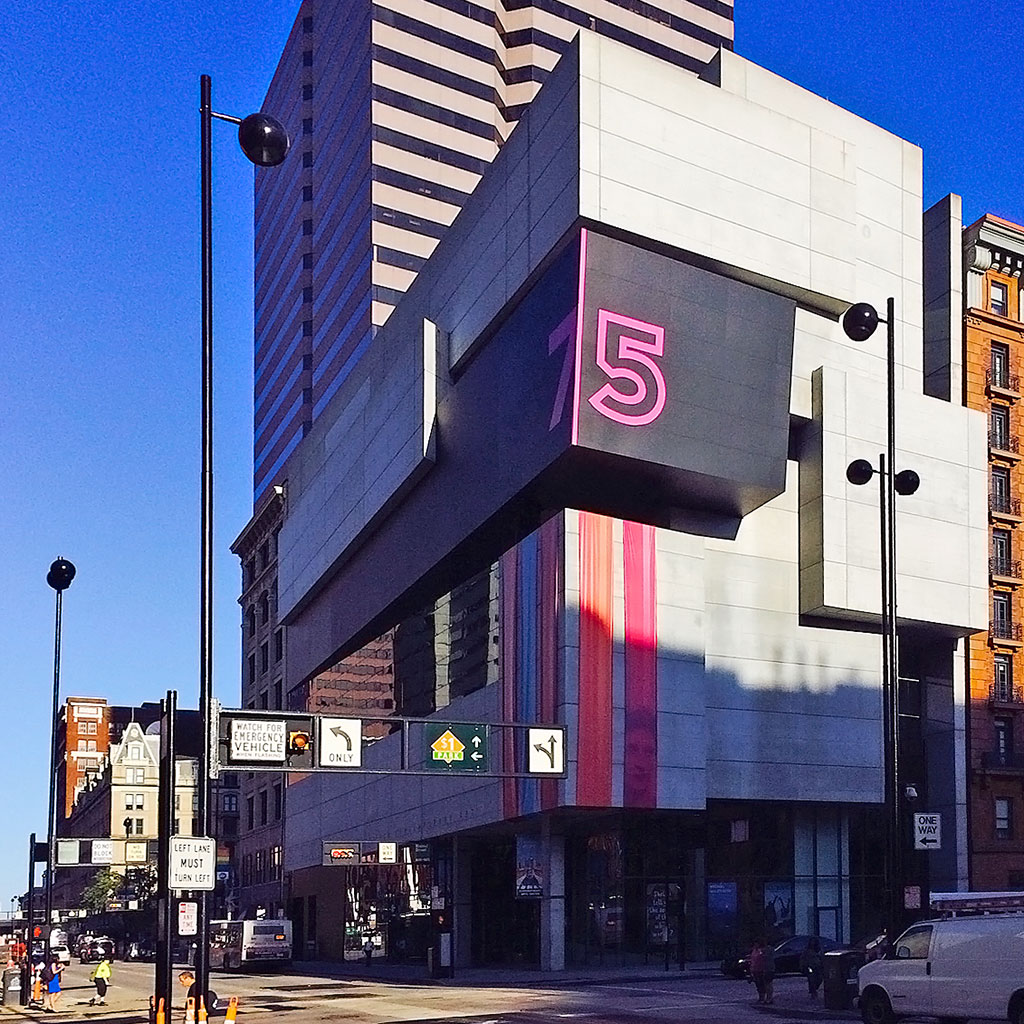
Contemporary Arts Center (2003)

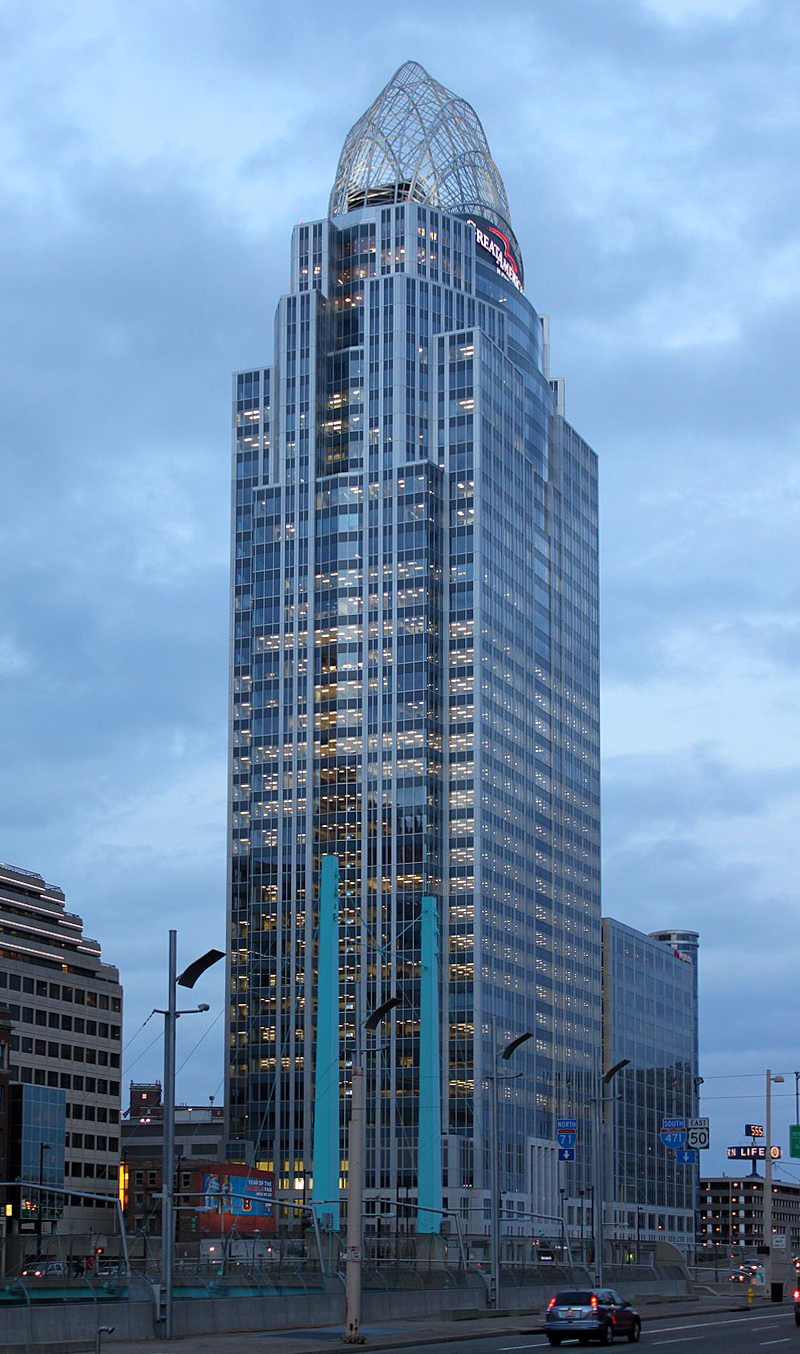
Queen City Square (2011)

=== Neighborhoods ===
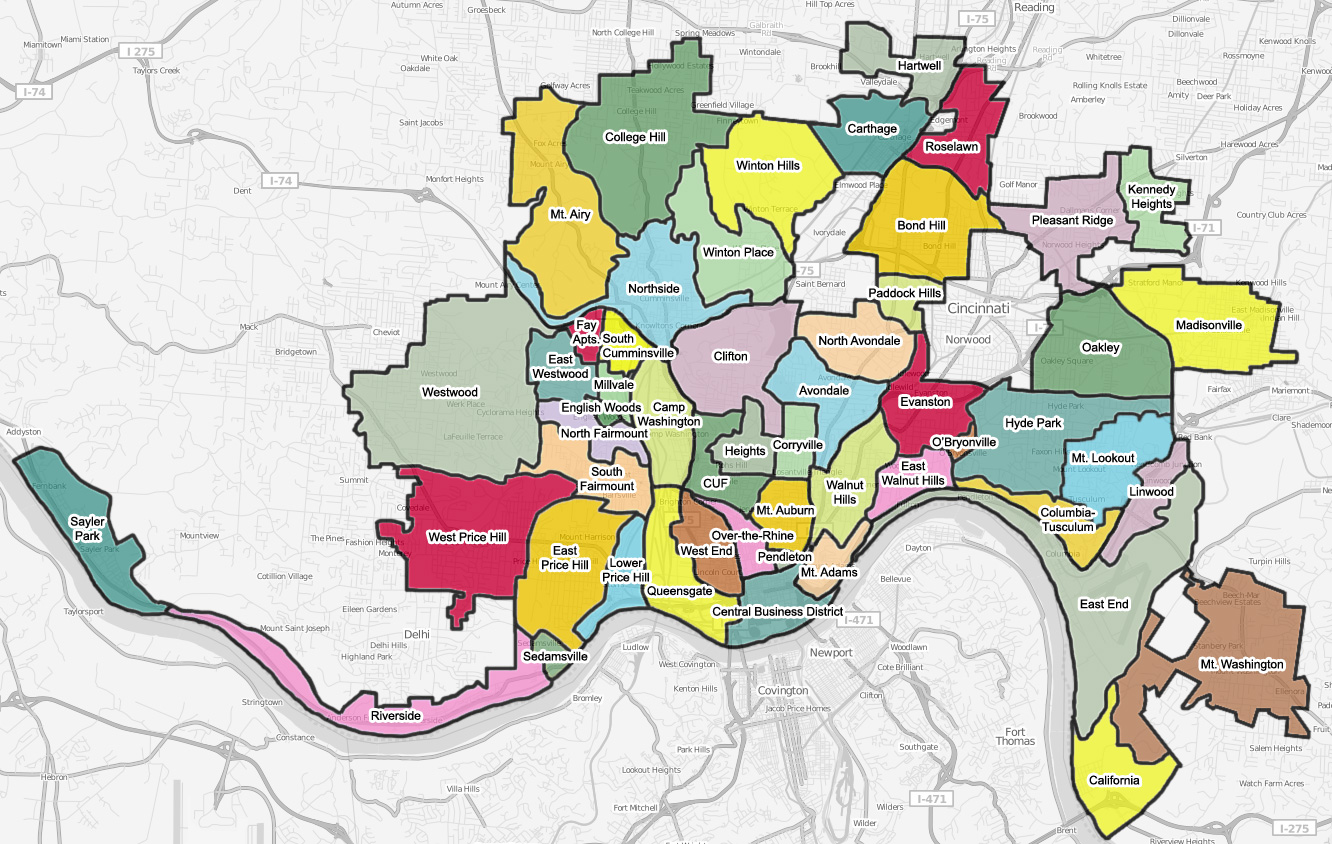
Neighborhoods of Cincinnati

Cincinnati consists of fifty-two neighborhoods. Many of these neighborhoods were once villages that have been annexed by the city, with many retaining their former names, such as Walnut Hills and Mount Auburn. Westwood is the city's most populous neighborhood, with other significant neighborhoods including CUF (home to the University of Cincinnati) and Price Hill.

Downtown Cincinnati is the city's central business district and contains a number of neighborhoods in the flat land between the Ohio River and uptown. These neighborhoods include Over-the-Rhine, Pendleton, Queensgate, and West End. Over-the-Rhine is among the largest, most intact urban historic districts in the United States. Most of Over-the-Rhine's ornate brick buildings were built by German immigrants from 1865 to the 1880s. The neighborhood has been intensely redeveloped in the 21st century, with a focus on fostering small businesses.

=== Climate ===
Cincinnati, Ohio (CVG)

Climate chart (precipitation, max. and min. temperature)
J	F	M	A	M	J	J	A	S	O	N	D
3.3 40 23	3.2 44 26	4.2 54 34	4.5 66 44	4.7 75 54	4.8 83 62	3.8 86 66	3.4 85 65	3.1 79 57	3.4 67 46	3.2 54 35	3.7 43 28
- █ Average max. and min. temperatures in °F
- █ Precipitation totals in inches
Metric conversion
J	F	M	A	M	J	J	A	S	O	N	D
84 4 −5	81 7 −3	106 12 1	115 19 7	119 24 12	121 28 17	97 30 19	87 30 18	79 26 14	85 19 8	82 12 2	95 6 −2
- █ Average max. and min. temperatures in °C
- █ Precipitation totals in mm

Cincinnati, Ohio (LUK)

Climate chart (precipitation, max. and min. temperature)
J	F	M	A	M	J	J	A	S	O	N	D
2.9 41 24	2.8 45 26	3.9 55 33	4.4 67 43	4.7 76 53	4.6 83 61	4.4 87 65	3.4 86 64	3.1 80 56	3.1 68 44	2.9 55 34	3.3 45 28
- █ Average max. and min. temperatures in °F
- █ Precipitation totals in inches
Metric conversion
J	F	M	A	M	J	J	A	S	O	N	D
73 5 −5	71 7 −4	100 13 1	111 19 6	119 24 12	117 29 16	112 30 19	86 30 18	78 27 13	77 20 7	74 13 1	84 7 −2
- █ Average max. and min. temperatures in °C
- █ Precipitation totals in mm

Cincinnati lies on the climatic boundary between the hot-summer humid continental climate zone (Köppen: Dfa) and the humid subtropical climate zone (Cfa). Because of lower river-valley elevations and the urban heat island effect, the urban core is slightly warmer—and more consistently subtropical under the 0 °C (32 °F) isotherm—than outlying stations such as CVG. Situated in this transitional zone near the southern edge of the Midwest, the city has milder winters, less snowfall, and a longer frost-free growing season than major cities in the upper and central Midwest.

Summers are hot and humid, with significant rainfall in each month. Highs reach 90 °F (32 °C) or above on an average 27 days per year, often with high dew points and humidity. July is the warmest month, with a daily average temperature of 75.9 °F (24.4 °C).

Winters are cool to cold and marked by sharp temperature swings, alternating between brief cold snaps and mild thaws. January, the coldest month, averages a high of 40.6 °F (4.8 °C) and a low of 23.6 °F (−4.7 °C). Lows reach 0 °F (−18 °C) on an average of about 1.5 nights per year, and prolonged deep freezes are uncommon. Winter typically brings a mix of rain, sleet, and snow. Most snow days produce less than an inch of accumulation, while days with at least 1 inch (2.5 cm) average about seven per year, and daily totals over 5 inches (13 cm) are rarer events that do not occur every winter. Seasonal snowfall averages around 23.3 inches (59 cm) at CVG.

While snow in Cincinnati is not as intense as many of the cities located closer to the Great Lakes, there have been notable cases of severe snowfall, including the Great Blizzard of 1978, and more notable snowstorms in 1994, 1999, 2007, 2021, 2025, and 2026.

Severe thunderstorms are common in the warmer months. Tornadoes, while infrequent, are not unknown, with such events striking the Metro Cincinnati area most recently in 1974, 1999, 2012, and 2017. Extremes range from −25 °F (−32 °C) on January 18, 1977, up to 108 °F (42 °C) on July 21 and 22, 1934.

Climate data for Cincinnati (Cincinnati/Northern Kentucky Int'l), 1991–2020 normals, (Note: Mean monthly maxima and minima (i.e. the expected highest and lowest temperature readings at any point during the year or given month) calculated based on data at said location from 1991 to 2020.) extremes 1871–present (Note: Official records for Cincinnati kept at downtown from January 1871 to March 1915, at the Cincinnati Abbe Observatory just north of downtown from April 1915 to March 1947, and at KCVG near Hebron, Kentucky since April 1947. For more information, see Threadex and History of Weather Observations Cincinnati, Ohio 1789–1947.)
Month	Jan	Feb	Mar	Apr	May	Jun	Jul	Aug	Sep	Oct	Nov	Dec	Year
Record high °F (°C)	77 (25)	79 (26)	88 (31)	90 (32)	95 (35)	102 (39)	108 (42)	103 (39)	102 (39)	95 (35)	82 (28)	75 (24)	108 (42)
Mean maximum °F (°C)	61.8 (16.6)	66.1 (18.9)	74.3 (23.5)	81.1 (27.3)	86.7 (30.4)	91.6 (33.1)	93.6 (34.2)	93.2 (34.0)	90.7 (32.6)	82.9 (28.3)	72.0 (22.2)	63.8 (17.7)	95.3 (35.2)
Mean daily maximum °F (°C)	39.6 (4.2)	43.7 (6.5)	53.5 (11.9)	65.5 (18.6)	74.5 (23.6)	82.6 (28.1)	86.0 (30.0)	85.2 (29.6)	78.9 (26.1)	66.7 (19.3)	53.8 (12.1)	43.3 (6.3)	64.4 (18.0)
Daily mean °F (°C)	31.4 (−0.3)	34.7 (1.5)	43.6 (6.4)	54.6 (12.6)	64.1 (17.8)	72.3 (22.4)	75.9 (24.4)	74.9 (23.8)	68.1 (20.1)	56.2 (13.4)	44.4 (6.9)	35.6 (2.0)	54.7 (12.6)
Mean daily minimum °F (°C)	23.1 (−4.9)	25.8 (−3.4)	33.8 (1.0)	43.7 (6.5)	53.7 (12.1)	62.1 (16.7)	65.9 (18.8)	64.6 (18.1)	57.3 (14.1)	45.7 (7.6)	35.1 (1.7)	27.9 (−2.3)	44.9 (7.2)
Mean minimum °F (°C)	0.1 (−17.7)	6.5 (−14.2)	14.8 (−9.6)	26.7 (−2.9)	36.6 (2.6)	49.2 (9.6)	55.9 (13.3)	54.6 (12.6)	42.5 (5.8)	29.8 (−1.2)	19.0 (−7.2)	9.1 (−12.7)	−2.7 (−19.3)
Record low °F (°C)	−25 (−32)	−17 (−27)	−11 (−24)	15 (−9)	27 (−3)	39 (4)	47 (8)	43 (6)	31 (−1)	16 (−9)	0 (−18)	−20 (−29)	−25 (−32)
Average precipitation inches (mm)	3.30 (84)	3.17 (81)	4.16 (106)	4.53 (115)	4.67 (119)	4.75 (121)	3.83 (97)	3.43 (87)	3.11 (79)	3.35 (85)	3.23 (82)	3.73 (95)	45.26 (1,150)
Average snowfall inches (cm)	7.7 (20)	6.7 (17)	3.4 (8.6)	0.4 (1.0)	0.0 (0.0)	0.0 (0.0)	0.0 (0.0)	0.0 (0.0)	0.0 (0.0)	0.2 (0.51)	0.8 (2.0)	4.1 (10)	23.3 (59)
Average extreme snow depth inches (cm)	3.5 (8.9)	3.4 (8.6)	2.0 (5.1)	0.2 (0.51)	0.0 (0.0)	0.0 (0.0)	0.0 (0.0)	0.0 (0.0)	0.0 (0.0)	0.1 (0.25)	0.4 (1.0)	2.0 (5.1)	6.0 (15)
Average precipitation days (≥ 0.01 in)	13.2	12.0	12.5	13.1	13.5	11.8	11.0	8.9	8.3	8.7	10.3	12.4	135.7
Average snowy days (≥ 0.1 in)	6.7	5.9	2.7	0.6	0.0	0.0	0.0	0.0	0.0	0.1	1.1	4.6	21.7
Average relative humidity (%)	72.2	70.1	67.0	62.8	66.9	69.2	71.5	72.3	72.7	69.2	71.0	73.8	69.9
Average dew point °F (°C)	19.9 (−6.7)	22.5 (−5.3)	31.3 (−0.4)	39.6 (4.2)	50.5 (10.3)	59.7 (15.4)	64.2 (17.9)	63.0 (17.2)	56.7 (13.7)	43.7 (6.5)	34.7 (1.5)	25.5 (−3.6)	42.6 (5.9)
Mean monthly sunshine hours	120.8	128.4	170.1	211.0	249.9	275.5	277.0	261.5	234.4	188.8	118.7	99.3	2,335.4
Percentage possible sunshine	40	43	46	53	56	62	61	62	63	55	39	34	52
Average ultraviolet index	2	3	5	6	8	9	9	8	7	4	2	2	5
Source 1: NOAA (relative humidity and sun 1961–1990)
Source 2: Weather Atlas (UV)

See or edit raw graph data.

Climate data for Cincinnati Municipal Airport (Lunken Field), 1991–2020 normals
Month	Jan	Feb	Mar	Apr	May	Jun	Jul	Aug	Sep	Oct	Nov	Dec	Year
Mean daily maximum °F (°C)	40.6 (4.8)	45.0 (7.2)	54.6 (12.6)	66.6 (19.2)	75.4 (24.1)	83.3 (28.5)	86.6 (30.3)	85.9 (29.9)	79.7 (26.5)	67.9 (19.9)	55.1 (12.8)	44.6 (7.0)	65.4 (18.6)
Daily mean °F (°C)	32.1 (0.1)	35.3 (1.8)	44.0 (6.7)	54.5 (12.5)	64.0 (17.8)	72.2 (22.3)	75.9 (24.4)	74.8 (23.8)	67.8 (19.9)	56.0 (13.3)	44.6 (7.0)	36.3 (2.4)	54.8 (12.7)
Mean daily minimum °F (°C)	23.6 (−4.7)	25.7 (−3.5)	33.4 (0.8)	42.5 (5.8)	52.7 (11.5)	61.2 (16.2)	65.3 (18.5)	63.7 (17.6)	55.9 (13.3)	44.2 (6.8)	34.0 (1.1)	28.0 (−2.2)	44.2 (6.8)
Average precipitation inches (mm)	2.86 (73)	2.79 (71)	3.94 (100)	4.37 (111)	4.70 (119)	4.61 (117)	4.39 (112)	3.39 (86)	3.07 (78)	3.05 (77)	2.91 (74)	3.32 (84)	43.40 (1,102)
Source: NOAA

== Demographics ==
Historical population
Census	Pop.	Note	%±
1800	850		—
1810	2,540		198.8%
1820	9,642		279.6%
1830	24,831		157.5%
1840	46,338		86.6%
1850	115,435		149.1%
1860	161,044		39.5%
1870	216,239		34.3%
1880	255,139		18.0%
1890	296,908		16.4%
1900	325,902		9.8%
1910	363,591		11.6%
1920	401,247		10.4%
1930	451,160		12.4%
1940	455,610		1.0%
1950	503,998		10.6%
1960	502,550		−0.3%
1970	452,525		−10.0%
1980	385,460		−14.8%
1990	364,040		−5.6%
2000	331,285		−9.0%
2010	296,943		−10.4%
2020	309,317		4.2%
2025 (est.)	314,367	▲	1.6%
U.S. Decennial Census; 1810–1970 1980–2000; 2010–2020

Demographic profile	2020	2010	2000	1990	1970	1950
White	50.3%	48.2%	53.0%	60.5%	71.9%	84.4%
—Non-Hispanic	48.2%	48.1%	51.7%	60.2%	71.4%	n/a
Black or African American	41.4%	44.8%	42.9%	37.9%	27.6%	15.5%
Hispanic or Latino (of any race)	4.2%	2.8%	1.3%	0.7%	0.6%	n/a
Asian	2.2%	1.8%	1.5%	1.1%	0.2%	0.1%

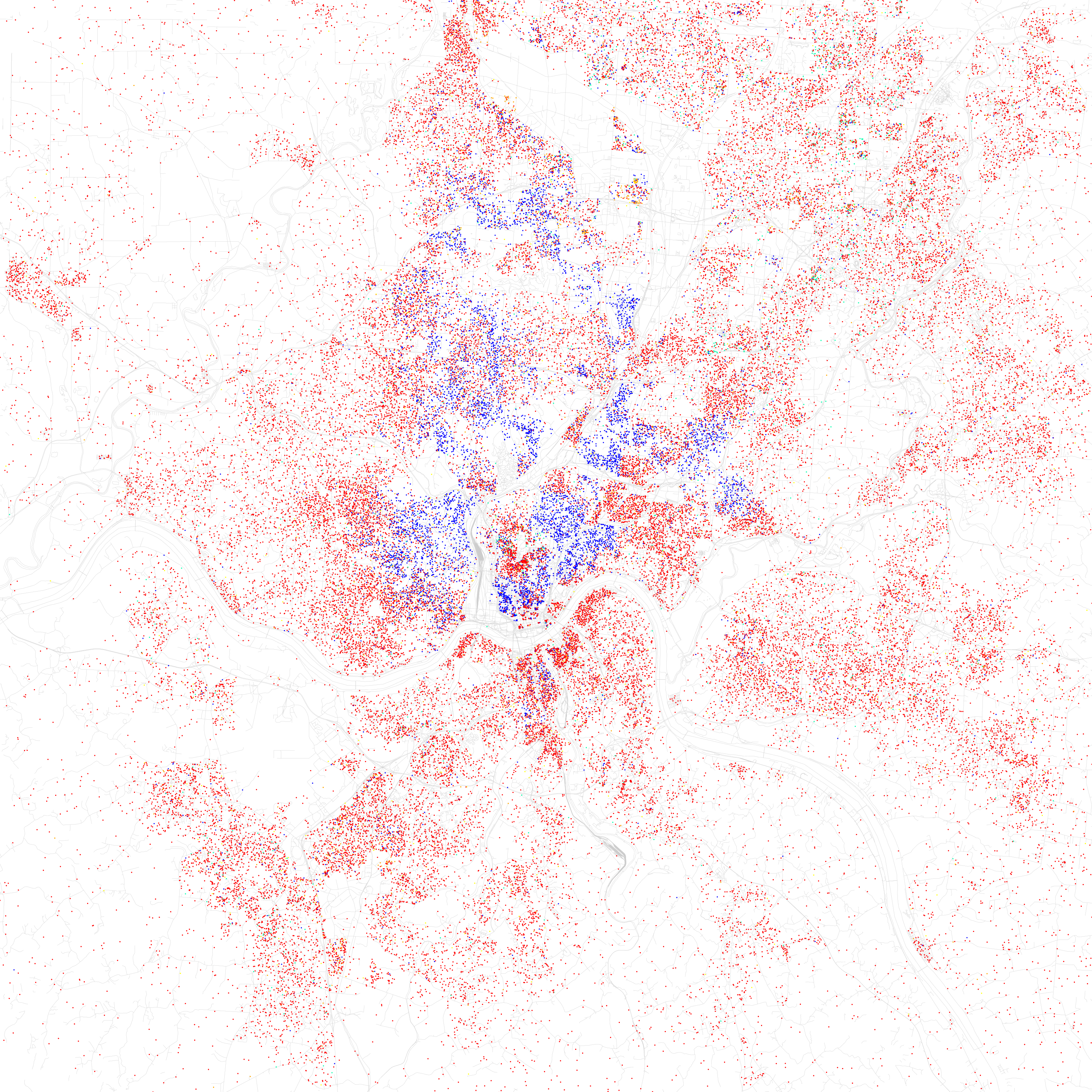
Map of racial distribution in Cincinnati, 2010 U.S. Census. Each dot is 25 people: ⬤ White ⬤ Black ⬤ Asian ⬤ Hispanic ⬤ Other

In 1950, Cincinnati reached its peak population of 503,998; thereafter, it lost population in every census count from 1960 to 2010. In the late 20th century, industrial restructuring caused a loss of jobs. More recently, the population has begun recovering: the 2020 census reports a population of 309,317, representing a 4.2% increase from 296,943 in 2010. This marked the first increase in population recorded since the 1950 Census, reversing a 60-year trend of population decline.

At the 2020 census, there were 309,317 people, 138,696 households, and 62,319 families residing in the city. The population density was 3,809.9 inhabitants per square mile (1,471.0/km^{2}). There were 161,095 housing units at an average density of 2,066.9 per square mile (798.0/km^{2}). The racial makeup of the city was 50.3% White, 41.4% African American, 0.1% Native American, 2.2% Asian, 0.1% Pacific Islander, 1.2% from other races, and 4.6% from two or more races. Hispanic or Latino of any race were 4.2% of the population.

There were 138,696 households, of which 25.4% had children under the age of 18 living with them, 23.2% were married couples living together, 19.1% had a female householder with no husband present, 4.4% had a male householder with no wife present, and 53.3% were non-families. 43.4% of all households were made up of individuals, and 9.9% had someone living alone who was 65 years of age or older. The average household size was 2.09 and the average family size was 3.00.

The median age in the city was 32.5 years. 21.6% of residents were under the age of 18; 14.6% were between the ages of 18 and 24; 28.4% were from 25 to 44; 24.1% were from 45 to 64; and 10.8% were 65 years of age or older. The gender makeup of the city was 48.4% male and 51.6% female.

In the 2023 census estimates, the Cincinnati metropolitan area had a population of 2,271,479, making it the 30th-largest metropolitan statistical area in the country. It includes the Ohio counties of Hamilton, Butler, Warren, Clermont, Clinton, and Brown, as well as the Kentucky counties of Boone, Bracken, Campbell, Gallatin, Grant, Kenton, and Pendleton, and the Indiana counties of Dearborn, Franklin, Union, and Ohio.

== Economy ==
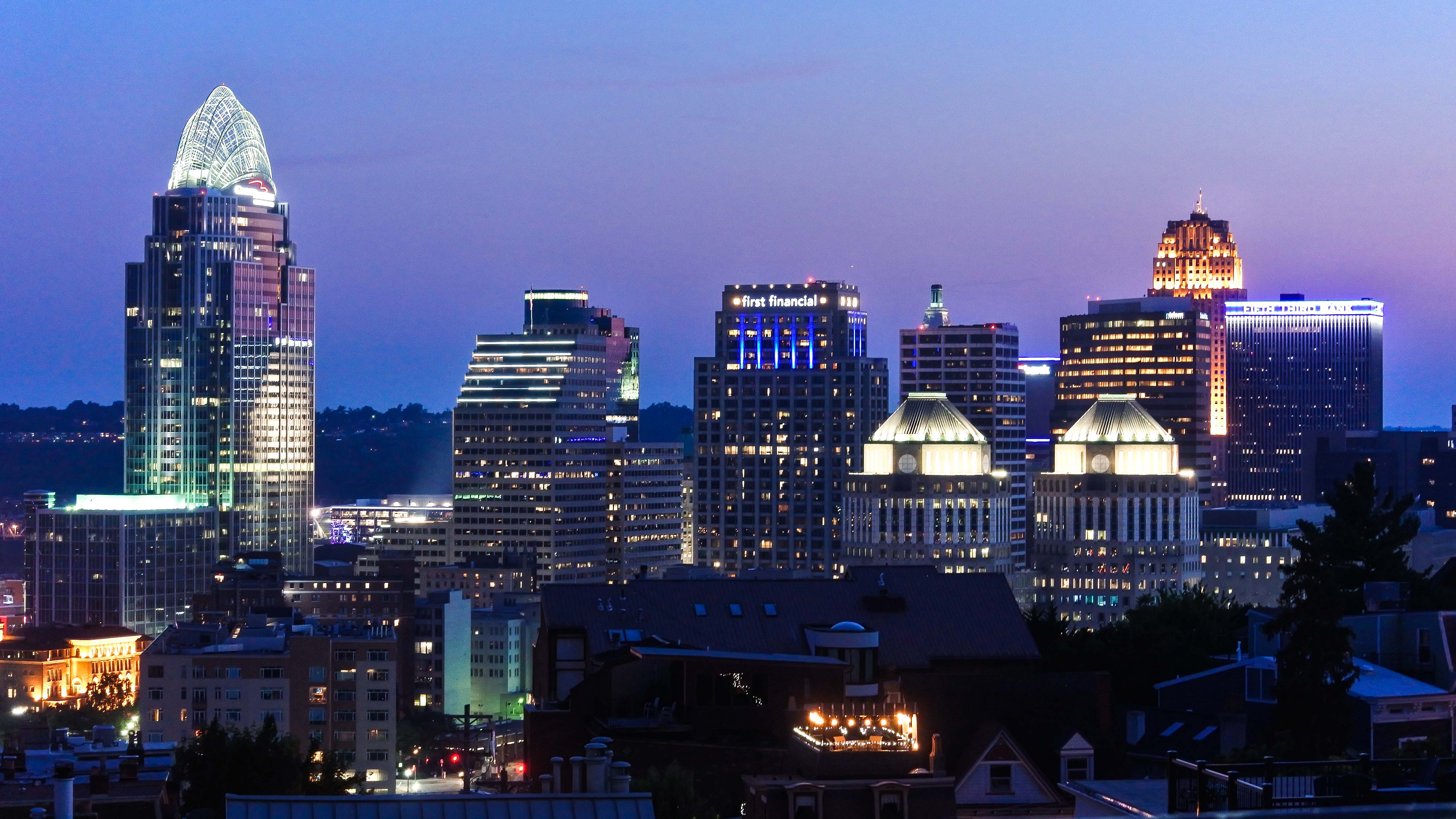
Downtown Cincinnati is the financial center of the city; eight Fortune 500 companies are headquartered in the metropolitan area.

Metropolitan Cincinnati has the twenty-eighth largest economy in the United States and the fifth largest in the Midwest, after Chicago (3rd), Minneapolis–St. Paul (15th), Detroit (16th), and St. Louis (24th). In 2016, it had the fastest-growing Midwestern economic capital. The gross domestic product for the region was $127 billion (~$168 billion in 2025) in 2015. The median home price is $158,200, and the cost of living in Cincinnati is 8% below the national average. As of September 2022, the unemployment rate is 3.3%, below the national average.

Several Fortune 500 companies are headquartered in Cincinnati, such as Kroger, Procter & Gamble, Western & Southern Financial Group, Fifth Third Bank, and American Financial Group. GE Aerospace is headquartered in the inner suburb of Evendale, while Cincinnati Financial and Cintas are headquartered in the exurbs of Fairfield and Mason, respectively. The Kroger Company employs over 20,000 people locally, making it the largest employer in the city; the four next largest employers are Cincinnati Children's Hospital, TriHealth, the University of Cincinnati, and St. Elizabeth Healthcare. Cincinnati is home to a branch office of the Federal Reserve Bank of Cleveland.

== Arts and culture ==
=== Society ===
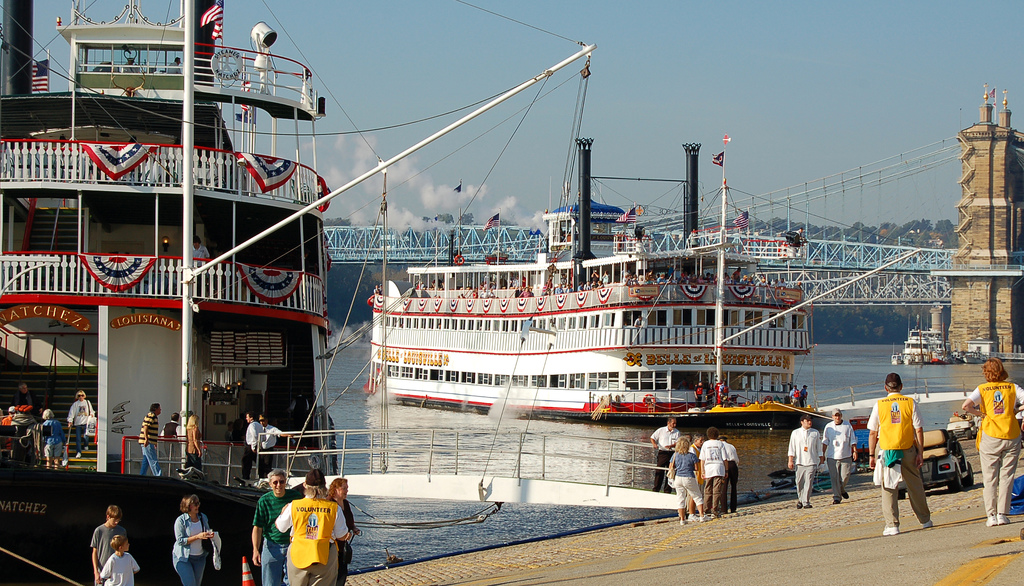
Tall Stacks, held every three or four years between 1988 and 2006, celebrated the city's riverboat heritage.

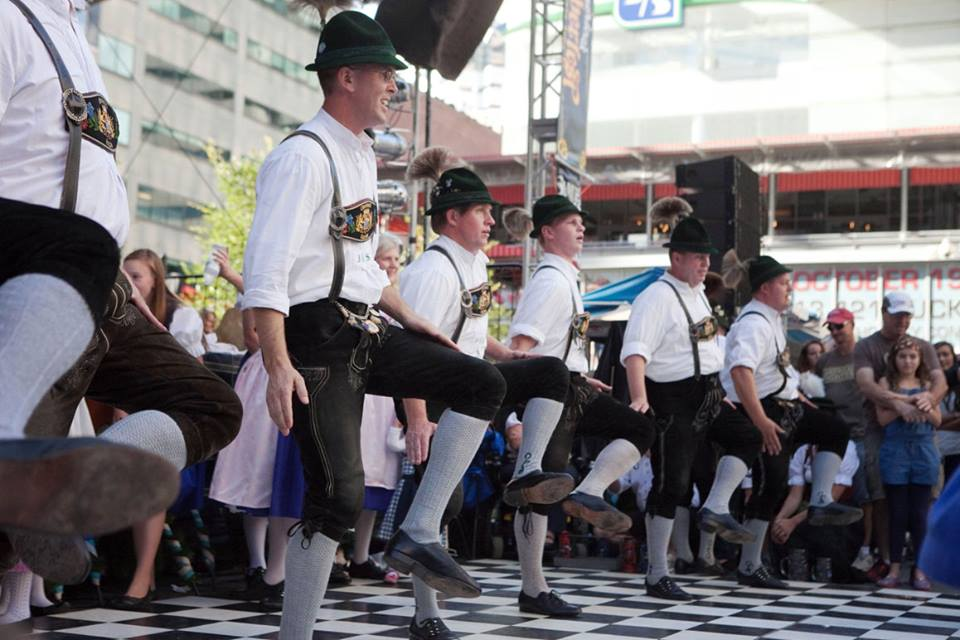
Dancers perform the Schuhplattler at Oktoberfest Zinzinnati

Cincinnati was platted and proliferated by American settlers, including Scotch Irish, frontiersmen, and keelboaters. For over a century and a half, Cincinnati went unchallenged as the most prominent of Ohio's cities, a role that earned it the nickname of "chief city of Ohio" in the 1879 New American Cyclopædia. In addition to this book, countless other books have documented the social history of both the city and its frontier people. The city fathers, of Anglo-American families of prominence, were Episcopalian. Inspired by its earlier horseback circuit preachers, early Methodism was also important. The first established Methodist class in the Northwest Territory came 1797 to nearby Milford. By 1879, there were 162 documented church edifices in the city. For this reason, from the beginning, Protestantism has played a formative role in the Cincinnati ethos. Christ Church Cathedral continues the legacy of the early Anglican leaders of Cincinnati, noted by historical associations as being a keystone of civic history; and among Methodist institutions were The Christ Hospital as well as projects of the German Methodist Church. One of Cincinnati's biggest proponents of Methodism was the Irish immigrant James Gamble, who together with William Procter founded Procter & Gamble; in addition to being a devout Methodist, Gamble and his estate donated money to construct Methodist churches throughout Greater Cincinnati.

Cincinnati, being a rivertown crossroads, depended on trade with the slave states south of the Ohio River at a time when thousands of black people were settling in the free state of Ohio. Most of them came after the American Civil War and were from Kentucky and Virginia with many of them fugitives who had sought freedom and work in the North. In the antebellum years, the majority of native-born whites in the city came from northern states, primarily Pennsylvania. Though 57 percent of whites migrated from free states, 26 percent were from southern states and they retained their cultural support for slavery. This quickly led to tensions between pro-slavery residents and abolitionists who sought lifting restrictions on free black people, as codified in the "Black Code" of 1804. In the pre-Civil War period, Cincinnati had been called "a Southern city on free soil". Volatile social conditions saw riots in 1829, when many black people lost their homes and property. As the Irish entered the city in the late 1840s, they competed with black people at the lower levels of the economy. White-led riots against black people occurred in 1836, when an abolitionist press was twice destroyed; and in 1842. More than 1,000 black people abandoned the city after the 1829 riots. Black people in Philadelphia and other major cities raised money to help the refugees recover from the destruction. By 1842 black people had become better established in the city; they defended themselves and their property in the riot, and worked politically as well.

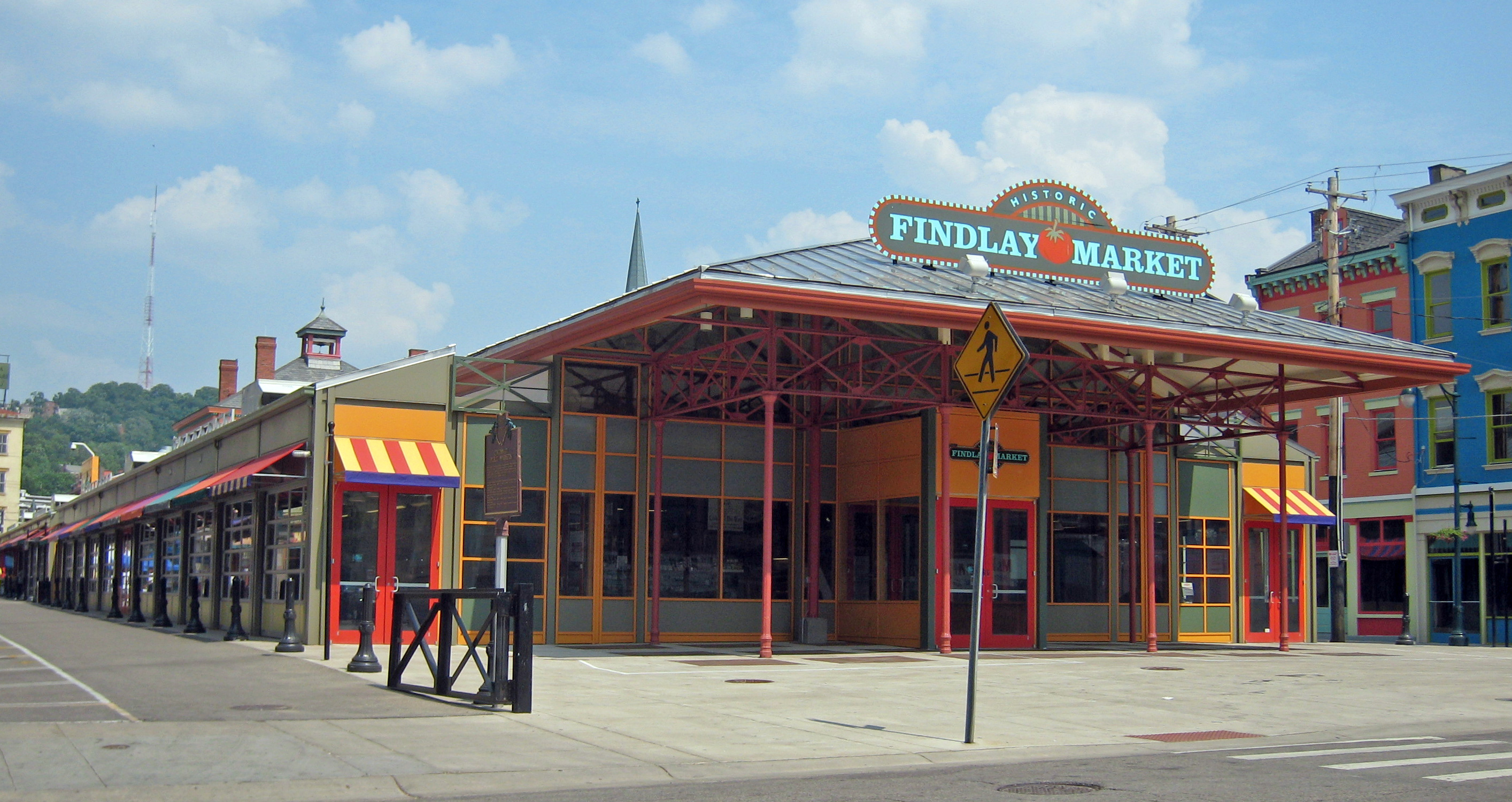
Findlay Market, Ohio's oldest operating market

Germans were among the earliest newcomers, migrating from Pennsylvania, Virginia and Tennessee. David Ziegler succeeded Arthur St. Clair in command at Fort Washington. After the conclusion of the Northwest Indian War and removal of Native Americans to the west, he was elected as Cincinnati's first town president in 1802. Cincinnati was influenced by Irishmen, and Prussians and Saxons (northern Germans), seeking to emigrate away from crowding and strife. In 1830, residents with German roots made up 5% of the population, as many had migrated from Pennsylvania; ten years later this had increased to 30%. Thousands of Germans entered the city after the German revolutions of 1848–49, and by 1900, more than 60 percent of its population was of Prussian background. The menial-jobbed, aggravated Irish often organized mobs, and the Germans, far away from their Pennsylvania Dutch connections, did the same. Traditions and celebrations of the city's immigrant communities have been sustained; nearby Waynesville hosts the yearly Ohio Sauerkraut Festival, and Cincinnati hosts several big yearly events which commemorate connections to the Old World. Oktoberfest Zinzinnati, Bockfest, and the Taste of Cincinnati feature local restaurateurs.

Cincinnati's Jewish community was developed by those from England and Germany. A large segment of the community, led by Isaac M. Wise, developed Reform Judaism in response to the influences of the Enlightenment and making their new lives in the United States. Rabbi Wise, known as a founding father of the Reform movement, and his contemporaries, bore a great influence on the Jewish faith in Cincinnati, the United States, and worldwide.

The NRHP-listed Potter Stewart United States Courthouse is a federal court, the United States Court of Appeals for the Sixth Circuit, one of thirteen United States courts of appeals. Federal Reserve Bank of Cleveland Cincinnati Branch is located across the street from the East Fourth Street Historic District.

=== Museums ===
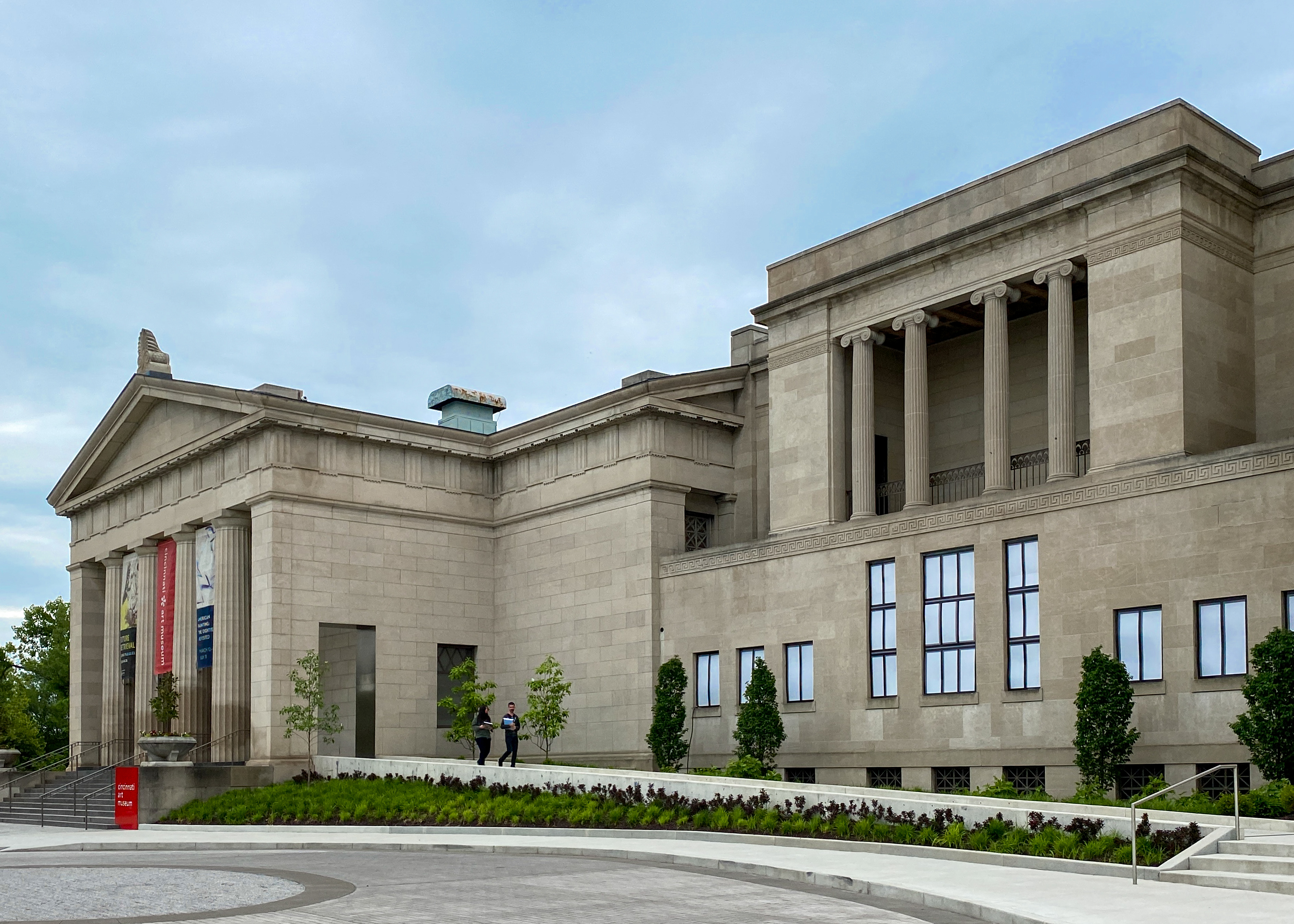
Founded in 1881, the Cincinnati Art Museum has one of the most comprehensive collections in the Midwest.

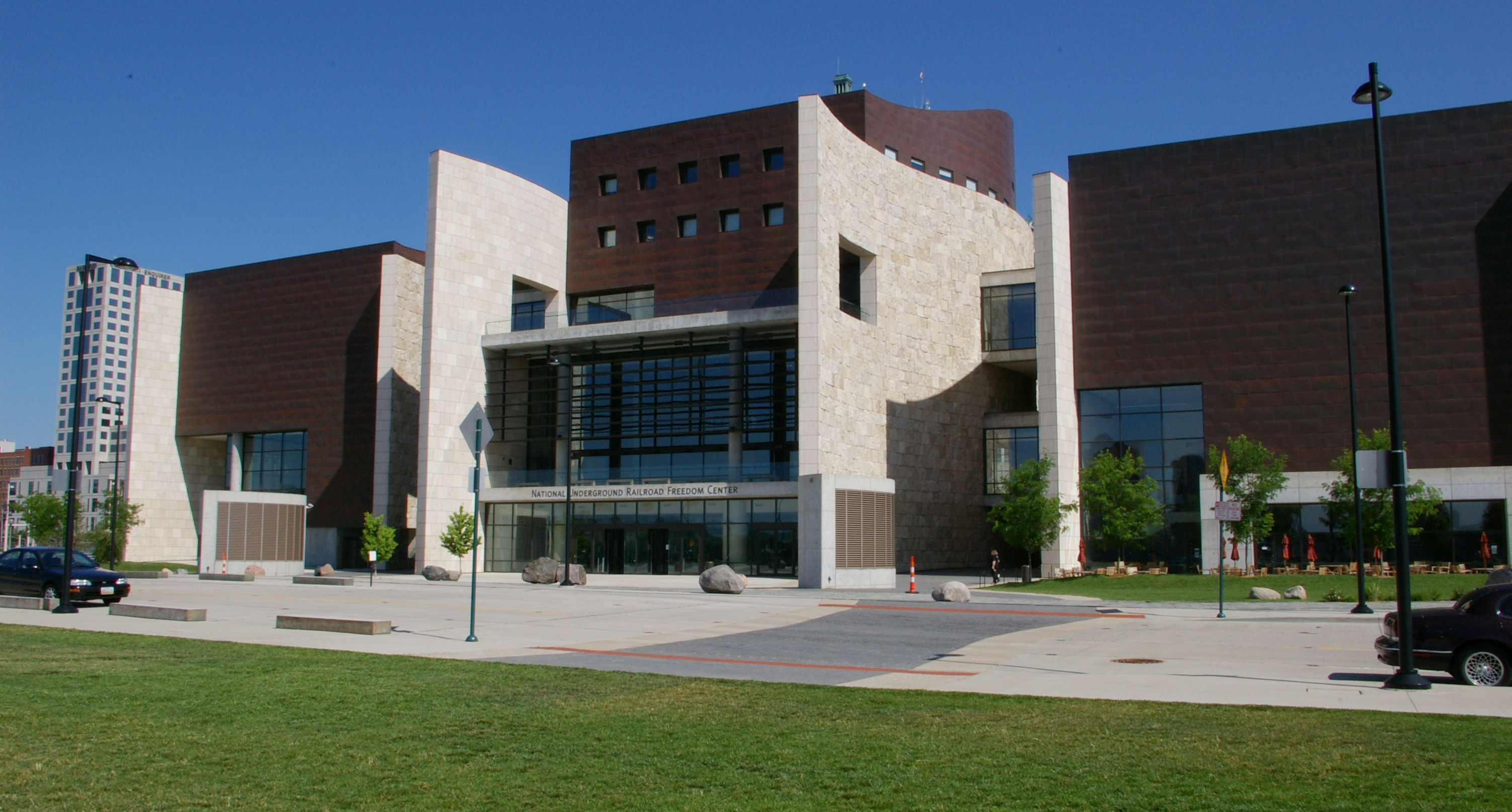
The National Underground Railroad Freedom Center recognizes Cincinnati's role in the history of the Underground Railroad.

The Cincinnati Art Museum is an art museum in the Eden Park neighborhood. Founded in 1881, it was the first purpose-built art museum west of the Allegheny Mountains. Its collection of over 67,000 works spanning 6,000 years of human history make it one of the most comprehensive collections in the Midwest. The Contemporary Arts Center was established in 1939 as one of the first contemporary art institutions in the country. The Art Academy of Cincinnati also features three public galleries, in addition to the Taft Museum of Art collection.

The city's Cincinnati Museum Center complex operates out of the Cincinnati Union Terminal in the Queensgate neighborhood. Within the complex are the Cincinnati History Museum, Museum of Natural History & Science, Robert D. Lindner Family Omnimax Theater, Cincinnati History Library and Archives, and Duke Energy Children's Museum. The National Underground Railroad Freedom Center opened in 2004 along the riverfront based on the history of the Underground Railroad, recognizing the role the city played in its history as thousands of slaves escaped to freedom by crossing the Ohio River from the southern slave states. U.S. president and chief justice William Howard Taft's childhood home, now the William Howard Taft National Historic Site, in Mount Auburn features exhibits on Taft's life and accomplishments.

The American Sign Museum features over 200 signs and other objects on display ranging from the late nineteenth century to the 1970s.

=== Music ===
Music-related events include the Cincinnati May Festival, Bunbury Music Festival, and Cincinnati Bell/WEBN Riverfest. Cincinnati hosted the World Choir Games in 2012 with the mantra "Cincinnati, the City that Sings!"

Cincinnati has given rise or been home to popular musicians and singers, including Lonnie Mack, Doris Day, Odd Nosdam, Dinah Shore, Fats Waller, Rosemary Clooney, Bootsy Collins, The Isley Brothers, Merle Travis, Hank Ballard, Otis Williams, Mood, Midnight Star, Calloway, The Afghan Whigs, Over the Rhine, Blessid Union of Souls, Freddie Meyer, 98 Degrees, The Greenhornes, The Deele, Enduser, Heartless Bastards, The Dopamines, Adrian Belew, The National, Foxy Shazam, Why?, Wussy, H-Bomb Ferguson, Sudan Archives and Walk the Moon, and alternative hip hop producer Hi-Tek calls the Metro Cincinnati region home. Andy Biersack, the lead vocalist for the rock band Black Veil Brides, was born in Cincinnati.

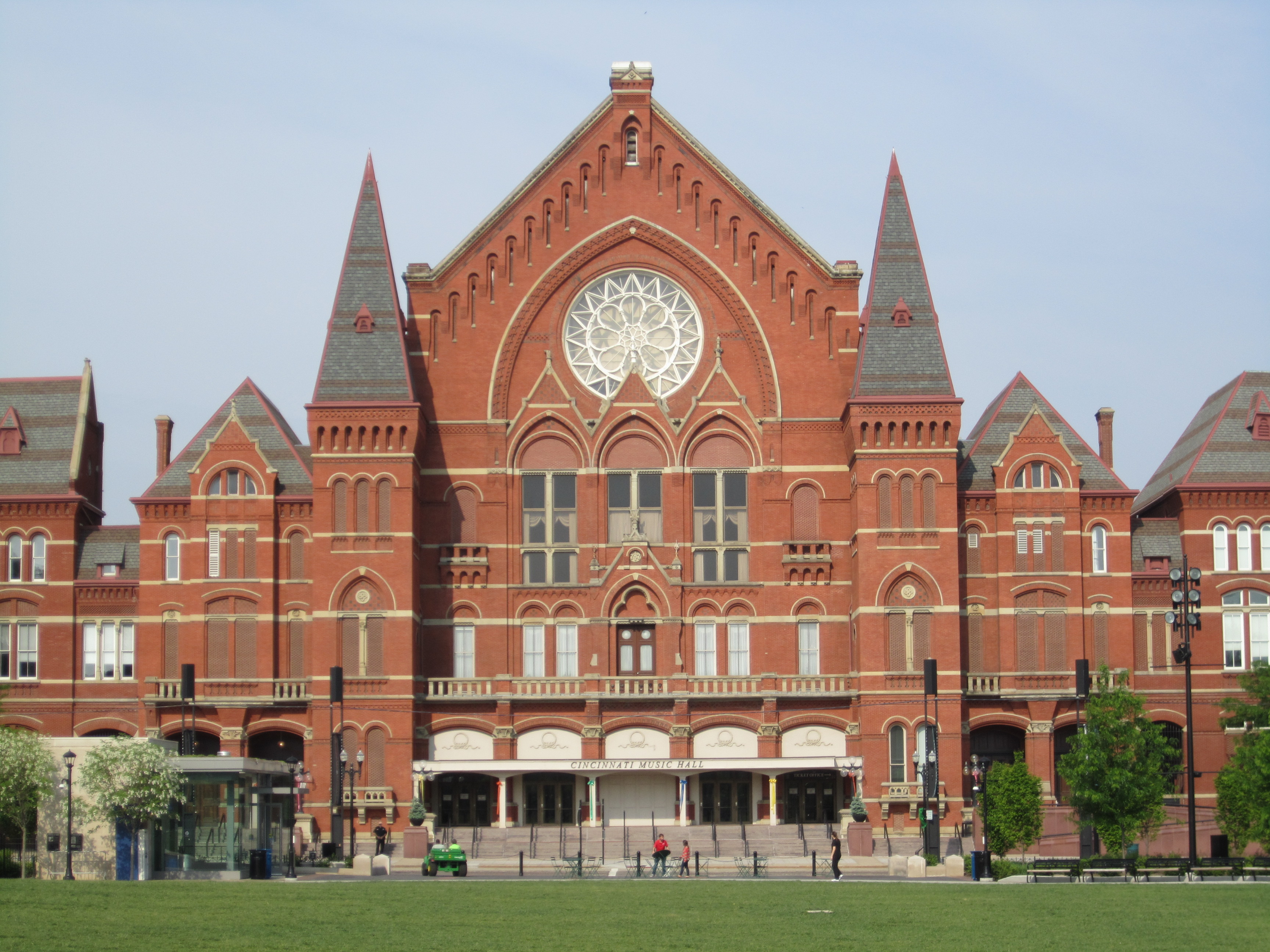
Cincinnati Music Hall in Over-the-Rhine is the city's principal concert hall.

The Cincinnati May Festival Chorus is a professional choir that has been in existence since 1880. The city is home to the Cincinnati Symphony Orchestra, Cincinnati Opera, Cincinnati Boychoir, and Cincinnati Ballet. Metro Cincinnati is also home to several regional orchestras and youth orchestras, including the Starling Chamber Orchestra and the Cincinnati Symphony Youth Orchestra. Music Director James Conlon and Chorus Director Robert Porco lead the Chorus through an extensive repertoire of classical music. The May Festival Chorus is the mainstay of the oldest continuous choral festival in the Western Hemisphere. Cincinnati Music Hall was built to house the May Festival.

Cincinnati is the subject of a Connie Smith song written by Bill Anderson, called Cincinnati, Ohio. Cincinnati is the main scenario for the international music production of Italian artist and songwriter Veronica Vitale called "Inside the Outsider". She embedded the sounds of the trains at Baltimore and Ohio Railroad Downtown Cincinnati, filmed her music single "Mi Sono innamorato di Te" at the American Sign Museum and recorded her heartbeat sound at Cincinnati Children's Hospital replacing it to the drums for her song "The Pulse of Light" during the broadcasting at Ryan Seacrest's studio. Furthermore, she released the music single "Nobody is Perfect" featuring legendary Cincinnati's bass player Bootsy Collins.

Cincinnati was a major early music recording center and was home to King Records, which helped launch the career of James Brown, who often recorded there, as well as Jewel Records, which helped launch Lonnie Mack's career, and Fraternity Records. Cincinnati had a vibrant jazz scene from the 1920s to today. Louis Armstrong's first recordings were done in the Cincinnati area, at Gennett Records, as were Jelly Roll Morton's, Hoagy Carmichael's, and Bix Beiderbecke, who took up residency in Cincinnati for a time. Fats Waller was on staff at WLW in the 1930s.

=== Theater ===
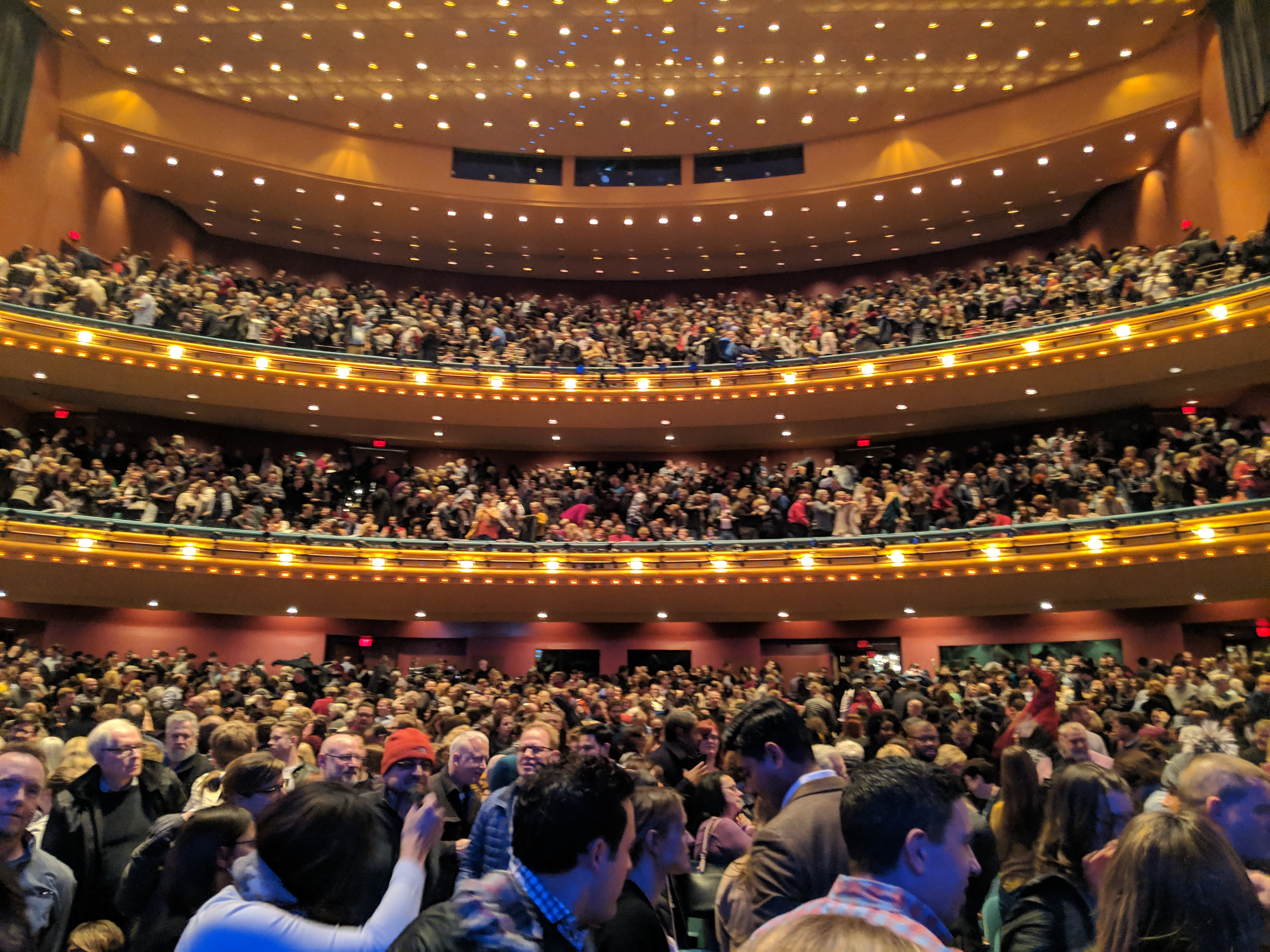
The Aronoff Center, one of Cincinnati's largest performing arts venues

Professional theatre has operated in Cincinnati since at least as early as the 1800s. Among the professional companies based in the city are Ensemble Theatre Cincinnati, Cincinnati Shakespeare Company, the Know Theatre of Cincinnati, Cincinnati Opera, and The Performance Gallery. The city is also home to Cincinnati Playhouse in the Park, which hosts regional premieres, and the Aronoff Center, which hosts touring Broadway shows each year via Broadway Across America. The city has community theatres, such as the Cincinnati Young People's Theatre, Cincinnati Music Theatre, and the Showboat Majestic (which is the last surviving showboat in the United States and possibly the world), and the Mariemont Players.

Since 2011, Cincinnati Opera and the University of Cincinnati College-Conservatory of Music have partnered to sponsor the Opera Fusion: New Works project. The Opera Fusion: New Works project acts as a program for composers or librettists to workshop an opera in a 10-day residency. This program is headed by the Director of Artistic Operations at Cincinnati Opera, Marcus Küchle, and the former Head of Opera at CCM, Robin Guarino.

In 2015, Cincinnati held the USITT 2015 Conference and Stage Expo at the Duke Energy Convention Center, bringing 5,000+ students, university educators, theatrical designers and performers, and other personnel to the city. The USITT Conference is considered the main conference for Theatre, Opera, and Dance in the United States.

=== Film and literature ===
A Rage in Harlem was filmed entirely in the Cincinnati neighborhood of Over the Rhine because of its similarity to 1950s Harlem. Movies that were filmed in part in Cincinnati include The Best Years of Our Lives (aerial footage early in the film), Ides of March, Fresh Horses, The Asphalt Jungle (the opening is shot from the Public Landing and takes place in Cincinnati although only Boone County, Kentucky, is mentioned), Rain Man, Miles Ahead, Airborne, Grimm Reality, Little Man Tate, City of Hope, An Innocent Man, Tango & Cash, A Mom for Christmas, Lost in Yonkers, Summer Catch, Artworks, Dreamer, Elizabethtown, Jimmy and Judy, Eight Men Out, Milk Money, Traffic, The Pride of Jesse Hallam, The Great Buck Howard, In Too Deep, Seven Below, Carol, Public Eye, The Last Late Night, and The Mighty. In addition, Wild Hogs is set, though not filmed, in Cincinnati.

The Cincinnati skyline was prominently featured in the opening and closing sequences of the CBS/ABC daytime drama The Edge of Night from its start in 1956 until 1980, when it was replaced by the Los Angeles skyline; the cityscape was the stand-in for the show's setting, Monticello. Procter & Gamble, the show's producer, is based in Cincinnati. The sitcom WKRP in Cincinnati and its sequel/spin-off The New WKRP in Cincinnati featured the city's skyline and other exterior shots in its credits, although was not filmed in Cincinnati. The city's skyline has also appeared in an April Fool's episode of The Drew Carey Show, which was set in Carey's hometown of Cleveland. 3 Doors Down's music video "It's Not My Time" was filmed in Cincinnati, and features the skyline and Fountain Square. Also, Harry's Law, the NBC legal dramedy created by David E. Kelley and starring Kathy Bates, was set in Cincinnati.

The Hollows series of books by Kim Harrison is an urban fantasy that takes place in Cincinnati. American Girl's Kit Kittredge sub-series also took place in the city, although the film based on it was shot in Toronto.

Cincinnati also has its own chapter (or "Tent") of The Sons of the Desert (The Laurel and Hardy Appreciation Society), which meets several times per year.

=== Cuisine ===
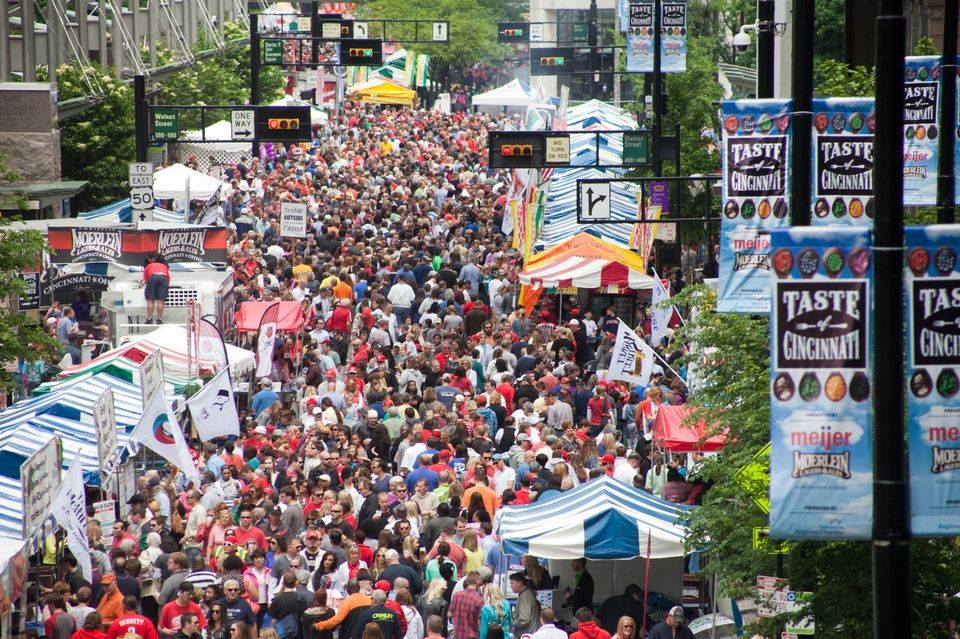
Approximately 1 million attend Taste of Cincinnati yearly, making it one of the largest street festivals in the United States.

Along with American cuisine, Cincinnati is host to numerous flavors infused from around the culinary world. Frisch's Big Boy, Graeter's ice cream, Kroger, LaRosa's Pizzeria, Montgomery Inn, Skyline Chili, Gold Star Chili, Aglamesis Bro's and United Dairy Farmers are Cincinnati eateries that sell their brand commodities in grocery markets and gas stations. Glier's goetta is produced in the Cincinnati area and is a popular local food. The Maisonette in Cincinnati was Mobil Travel Guide's longest-running five-star restaurant in the United States, holding that distinction for 41 consecutive years until it closed in 2005. Its former head chef, Jean-Robert de Cavel, has opened four new restaurants in the area since 2001.

One of the United States' oldest and most celebrated bars, Arnold's Bar and Grill in downtown Cincinnati has won awards from Esquire magazine's "Best Bars in America", Thrillist's "Most Iconic Bar in Ohio", The Daily Meal's "150 Best bars in America" and Seriouseats.com's "The Cincinnati 10". "If Arnold's were in New York, San Francisco, Chicago, or Boston—somewhere, in short, that people actually visit—it would be world-famous," wrote David Wondrich.

The Filet-O-Fish was created in 1962 by Lou Groen, the owner of the first McDonald's franchise in the Cincinnati area, to cater to Catholic patrons who abstained from meat on Fridays.

Traditional local delicacies include opera creams and nectar soda, both served at Graeter's and Aglamesis Bro's ice cream parlors. Grippo's and Pringles potato chips also have their origins in the area, the latter produced by local company Procter & Gamble. Other foodstuffs of local origin include Frank's RedHot sauce and Slush Puppies.

==== Cincinnati chili ====
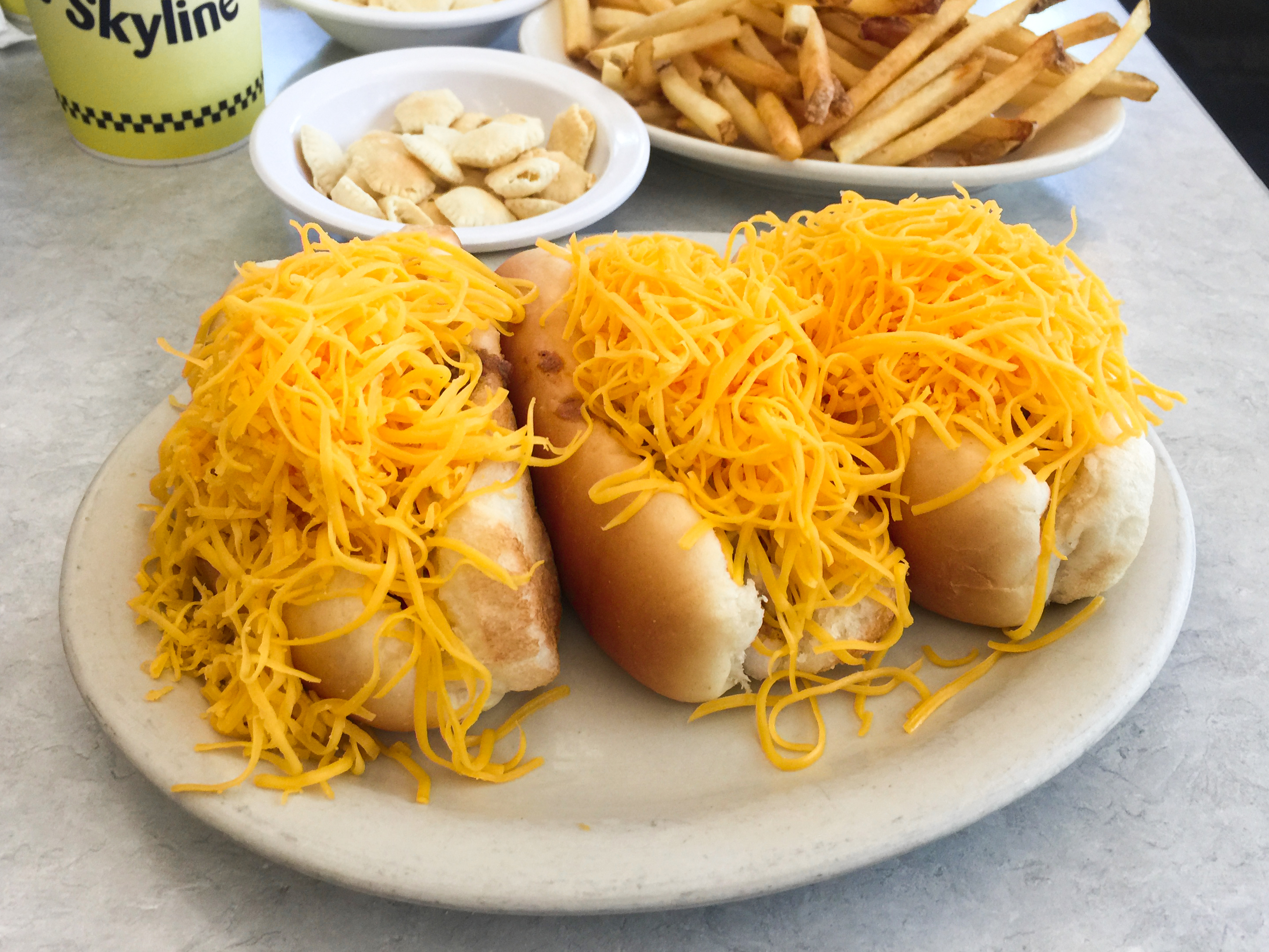
Cheese coneys containing Cincinnati chili, developed in the 1920s by Macedonian immigrants in Cincinnati

Cincinnati chili, a spiced sauce served over noodles, usually topped with cheese and often with diced onions or beans, is the area's "best-known regional food". A variety of recipes are served by respective parlors, including Skyline Chili, Gold Star Chili, and Dixie Chili and Deli, plus independent chili parlors including Camp Washington Chili, Empress Chili and Moonlight Chili. It was first developed by Macedonian immigrant restaurateurs in the 1920s. Cincinnati has been called the "Chili Capital of America" and "of the World" because it has more chili restaurants per capita than any other city in the United States or in the world.

==== Goetta ====
Goetta is a meat-and-grain sausage or mush of German inspiration. It is primarily composed of ground meat (pork, or pork and beef), pin-head oats and spices.

==== Mock turtle soup ====
Similarly to goetta's origins, mock turtle soup was a dish popularized by the influx of German immigrants in the late 19th century. Originally made with offal, today Cincinnati-style mock turtle soup is characterized by ground beef, hard-boiled eggs, and ketchup. The only remaining commercial canner of the soup, Worthmore, has produced it in Cincinnati since 1918.

=== Dialect ===
The citizens of Cincinnati speak in a General American dialect. Unlike the rest of the Midwest, Southwest Ohio shares some aspects of its vowel system with northern New Jersey English. Most of the distinctive local features among speakers float as Midland American. There is also some influence from the Southern American dialect found in Kentucky. A touch of northern German is audible in the local vernacular: some residents use the word please when asking a speaker to repeat a statement. This usage is taken from the German practice, when bitte (a shortening of the formal "Wie bitte?" or "How please?"), was used as shorthand for asking someone to repeat.

== Sports ==
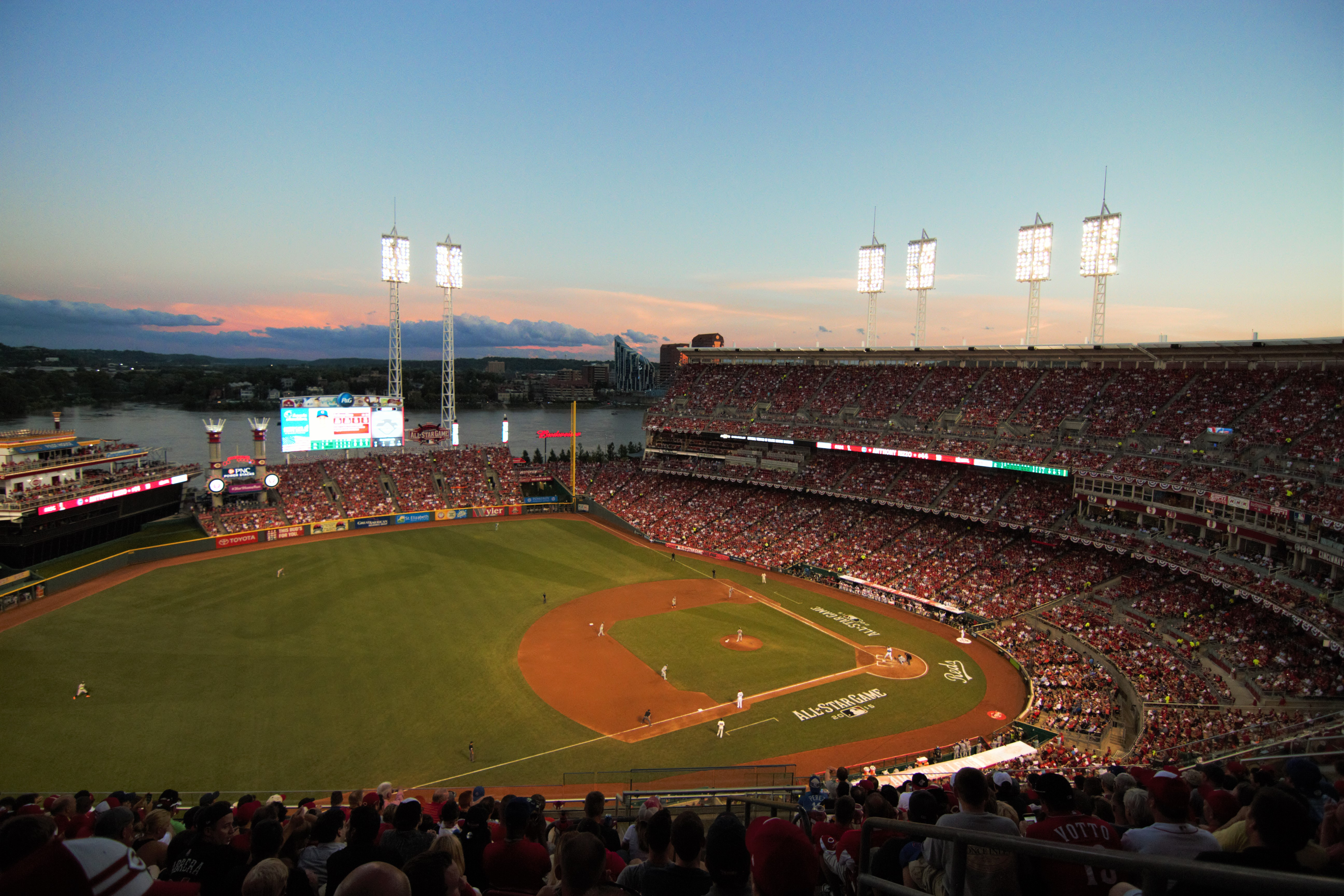
Great American Ball Park, home to the Cincinnati Reds

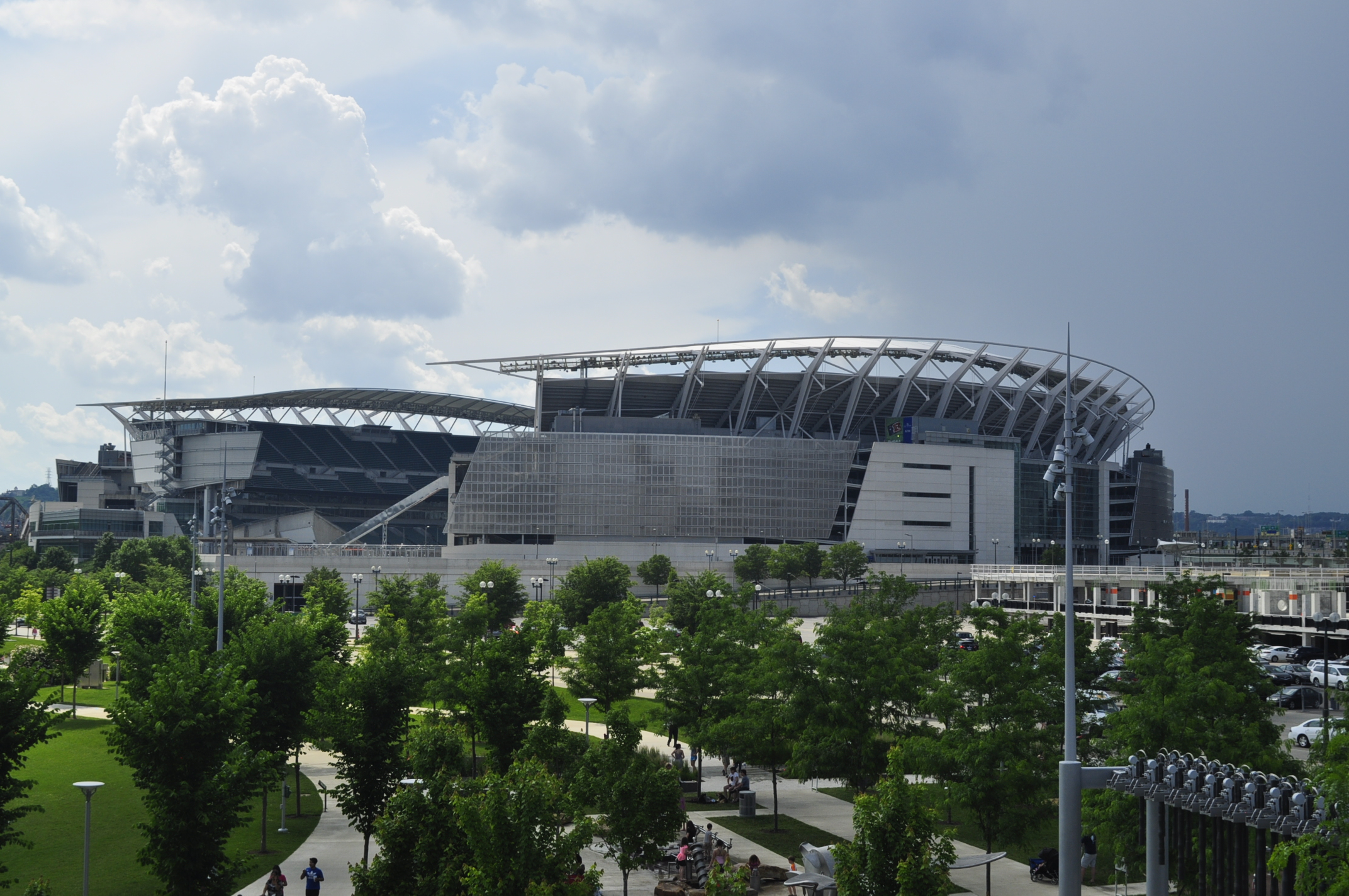
Paycor Stadium, home to the Cincinnati Bengals

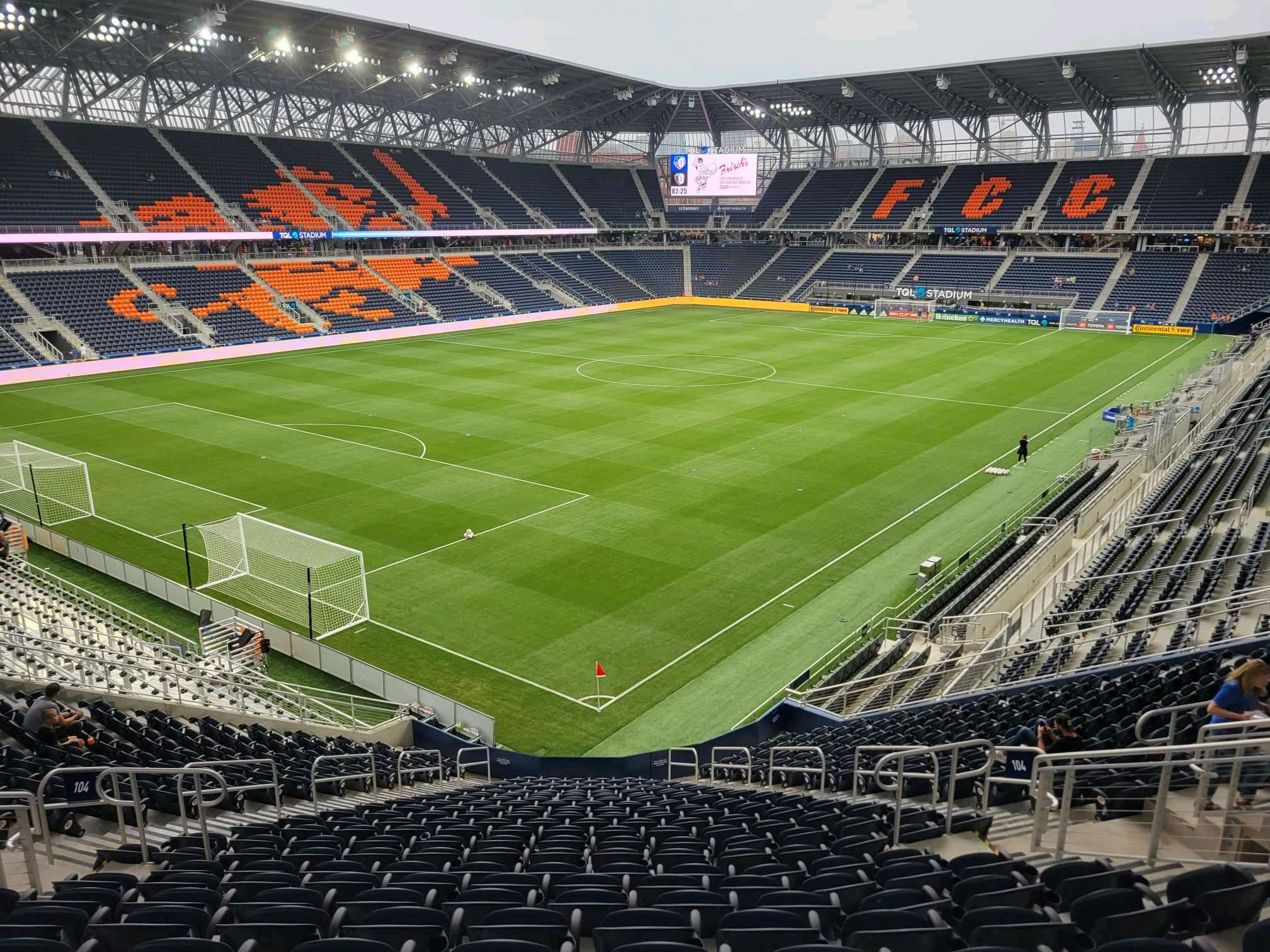
TQL Stadium, home to FC Cincinnati

Cincinnati has three major league teams, five minor league teams, five college institutions with sports teams, and seven major sports venues. Cincinnati's three major league teams are Major League Baseball's Reds, who were named for America's first professional baseball team, the Cincinnati Red Stockings; the Bengals of the National Football League; and FC Cincinnati, which became a Major League Soccer franchise in 2019.

On Major League Baseball Opening Day, Cincinnati has the distinction of holding the "traditional opener" in baseball each year, due to its baseball history. Children have been known to skip school on Opening Day, and it is commonly thought of as a holiday. The Cincinnati Reds have won five World Series titles, in 1919, 1940, 1975, 1976, and 1990. The Reds had one of the most successful baseball clubs of all time in the mid-1970s, known as The Big Red Machine.

The Bengals have made three Super Bowl appearances since the franchise was founded, in 1982, 1989, and 2022, but have yet to win a championship. The Bengals enjoy strong rivalries with the Cleveland Browns and Pittsburgh Steelers, both of whom are also members of the AFC North division. Whenever the Bengals and Carolina Panthers play against each other in an inter-conference matchup that occurs every four years, their games are dubbed the "Queen City Bowl", as Charlotte, North Carolina, the home city of the Panthers, is also known as the Queen City.

FC Cincinnati is a soccer team that plays in Major League Soccer. FC Cincinnati made its home debut in the USL on April 9, 2016, before a crowd of more than 14,000 fans. On their next home game against Louisville City FC, FC Cincinnati broke the all-time USL attendance record with a crowd of 20,497; on May 14, 2016, it broke its own record, bringing in an audience of 23,375 on its 1–0 victory against the Pittsburgh Riverhounds. After breaking the USL attendance record on several additional occasions, the club moved to Major League Soccer (MLS) for the 2019 season. FC Cincinnati was awarded an MLS bid on May 29, 2018, and moved to TQL Stadium in the West End neighborhood just northwest of downtown in 2021.

Cincinnati is also home to two men's college basketball teams: the Cincinnati Bearcats and Xavier Musketeers. These two teams face off as one of college basketball's rivalries known as the Crosstown Shootout. In 2011, the rivalry game erupted in an on-court brawl at the end of the game that saw multiple suspensions follow. The Musketeers have made 10 of the last 11 NCAA tournaments while the Bearcats have won two Division I National Championships. Previously, the Cincinnati Royals competed in the National Basketball Association from 1957 to 1972; they are now known as the Sacramento Kings.

The Flying Pig Marathon is a yearly event attracting many runners and acts as a qualifier to the Boston Marathon.

The Cincinnati Open, a historic international men's and women's tennis tournament that is part of the ATP Tour Masters 1000 Series and the WTA 1000 Series, was established in the city in 1899 and has been held at the Lindner Family Tennis Center in suburban Mason since 1979.

The Cincinnati Cyclones are a minor league AA-level professional hockey team playing in the ECHL. Founded in 1990, the team plays at the Heritage Bank Center. They won the 2010 Kelly Cup Finals, their 2nd championship in three seasons.

The Kroger Queen City Championship is played annually on the LPGA Tour at Maketewah Country Club. Its 2022 debut marked the first time since 1963 that women's professional golf returned to Cincinnati.

The table below shows sports teams in the Cincinnati area that average more than 5,000 fans per game:

Cincinnati teams (yearly attendance > 5,000)
Club	Sport	Founded	League	Venue	Avg attend	Ref
Cincinnati Reds	Baseball	1882	Major League Baseball	Great American Ball Park	25,164	
Cincinnati Bearcats	Football	1885	NCAA Division I	Nippert Stadium	33,871	
Cincinnati Bearcats	Basketball	1901	NCAA Division I	Fifth Third Arena	9,415	
Xavier Musketeers	Basketball	1920	NCAA Division I	Cintas Center	10,281	
Cincinnati Bengals	Football	1968	National Football League	Paycor Stadium	66,247	
Cincinnati Cyclones	Ice hockey	1990	ECHL	Heritage Bank Center	6,633	
FC Cincinnati	Soccer	2015	Major League Soccer	TQL Stadium	25,265	

== Parks and recreation ==
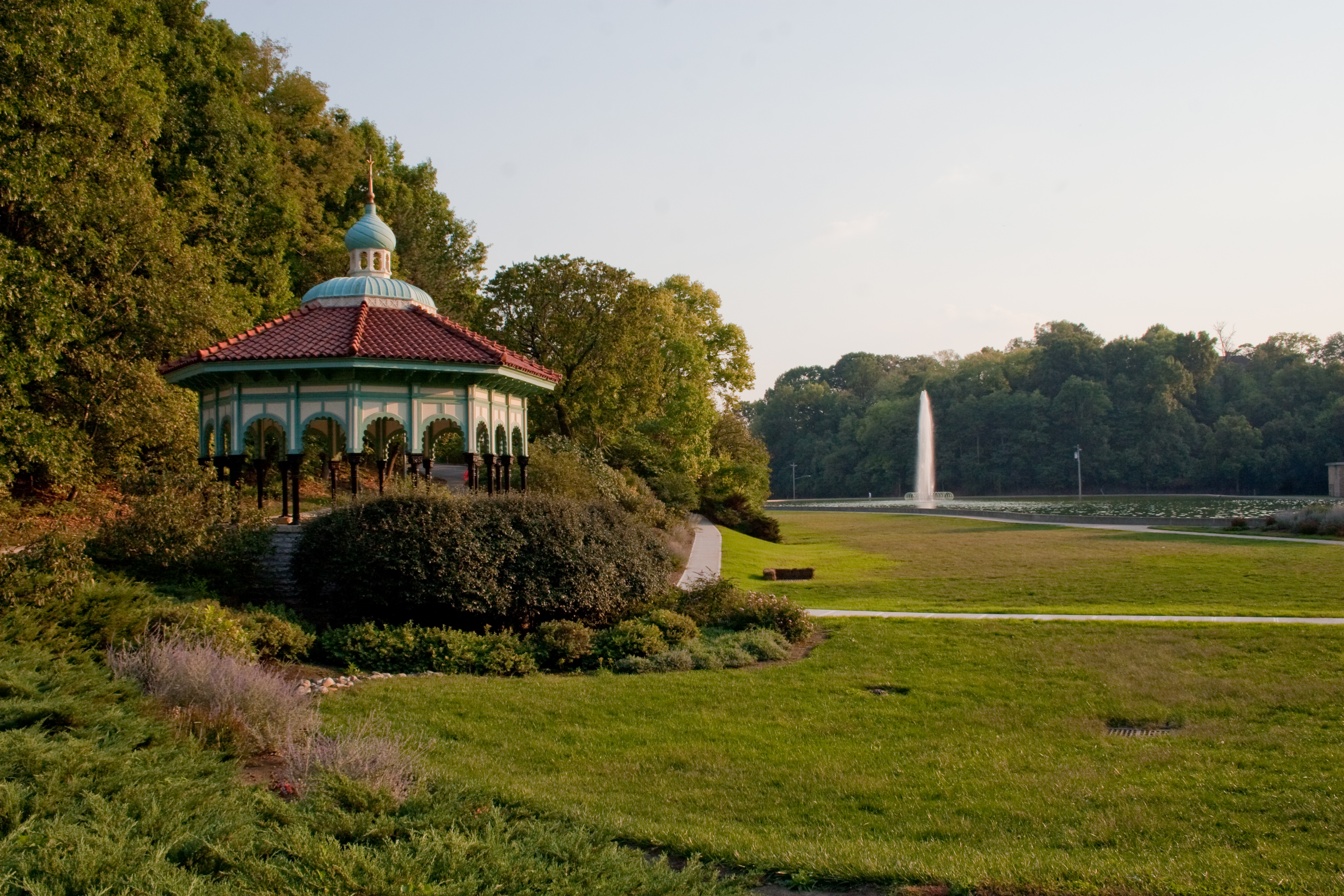
The Spring House Gazebo at Eden Park in Walnut Hills

The Cincinnati Park Board maintains and operates all city parks in Cincinnati. Established in 1911 with the purchase of 168 acres (0.68 km^{2}), today the board services more than 5,000 acres (20 km^{2}) of city park space. Notable historic public parks and landscapes include the 19th-century Spring Grove Cemetery and Arboretum, Eden Park, and Mount Storm Park, all designed by Prussian émigré landscape architect Adolph Strauch. The city also has several public golf courses, including the historic Avon Fields Golf Course.

Downtown Cincinnati towers about Fountain Square, the public square and event locale. Fountain Square was renovated in 2006. Cincinnati rests along 22 miles (35 km) of riverfront about northern banks of the Ohio, stretching from California to Sayler Park, giving the Ohio a prominent place in the life of the city.

The Cincinnati Zoo & Botanical Garden in Avondale is the second-oldest zoo in the United States. It was appointed as a National Historic Landmark in 1987. The zoo houses over 500 species, 1,800 animals and 3,000 plant species. In addition, the zoo also has conducted several breeding programs in its history. The zoo is frequently cited among the best in the country.

== Government and politics ==
Presidential election results in Cincinnati
Year	Democratic	Republican	Others
2020	77.3% 106,620	21.2% 29,222	1.5% 2,126
2016	74.6% 100,876	21.3% 28,820	4.1% 5,590

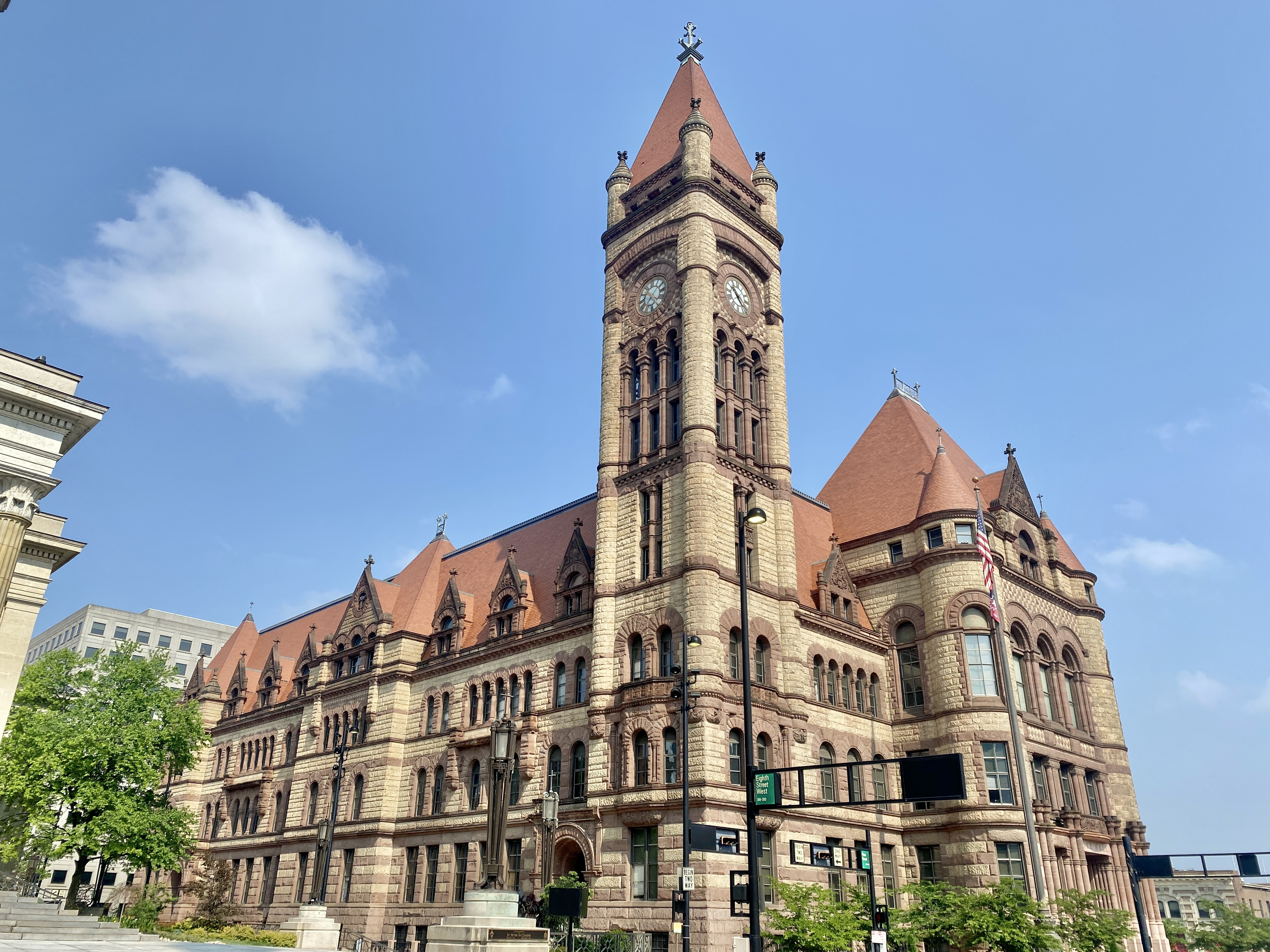
Cincinnati City Hall, completed in 1893

The city proper operates with a nine-member city council, whose members are elected at-large. Prior to 1924, city council members were elected through a system of wards. The ward system was subject to corruption due to partisan rule. From the 1880s to the 1920s, the Republican Party dominated city politics, with the political machine of George B. "Boss" Cox exerting control.

In 1923, a reform movement arose which ended machine rule. It was led by another Republican, Murray Seasongood. He founded the Charter Committee, which used ballot initiatives in 1924 to replace the ward system with the current at-large system. They gained approval by voters for a council–manager government form of government, in which a smaller council hires a professional manager to operate the daily affairs of the city. From 1924 to 1957, the council was elected by proportional representation and single transferable voting. Starting with Ashtabula in 1915, several major cities in Ohio adopted this electoral system, which had the practical effect of reducing ward boss and political party power. For that reason, such groups opposed it.

In an effort to overturn the charter that provided for proportional representation, opponents in 1957 fanned fears of black political power, at a time of increasing civil rights activism. The PR/STV system had enabled minorities to enter local politics and gain seats on the city council more than they had before, in proportion to their share of the population. This made the government more representative of the residents of the city.

Overturning that charter, in 1957, all candidates had to run in a single race for the nine city council positions. The top nine vote-getters were elected (the "9-X system"), which favored candidates who could appeal to the entire geographic area of the city and reach its residents with campaign materials. The mayor was elected by the council. In 1977, 33-year-old Jerry Springer, later a notable television talk show host, was chosen to serve one year as mayor.

To have their votes count more, starting in 1987, the top vote-getter in the city council election was automatically selected as mayor. Starting in 1999, the mayor was elected separately in a general at-large election for the first time. The city manager's role in government was reduced. These reforms were referred to as the "strong mayor" reforms, to make the public officials accountable to voters. Cincinnati politics include the participation of the Charter Party, the political party with the third-longest history of winning in local elections. In October 2011, the Council became the first local government in the United States to adopt a resolution recognizing freedom from domestic violence as a fundamental human right. In January 2017, Cincinnati's mayor declared the city a sanctuary city.

Cincinnati is home to the United States Court of Appeals for the Sixth Circuit, based in the Potter Stewart United States Courthouse. It has appellate jurisdiction over Kentucky, Michigan, Ohio, and Tennessee.

=== Police and fire services ===
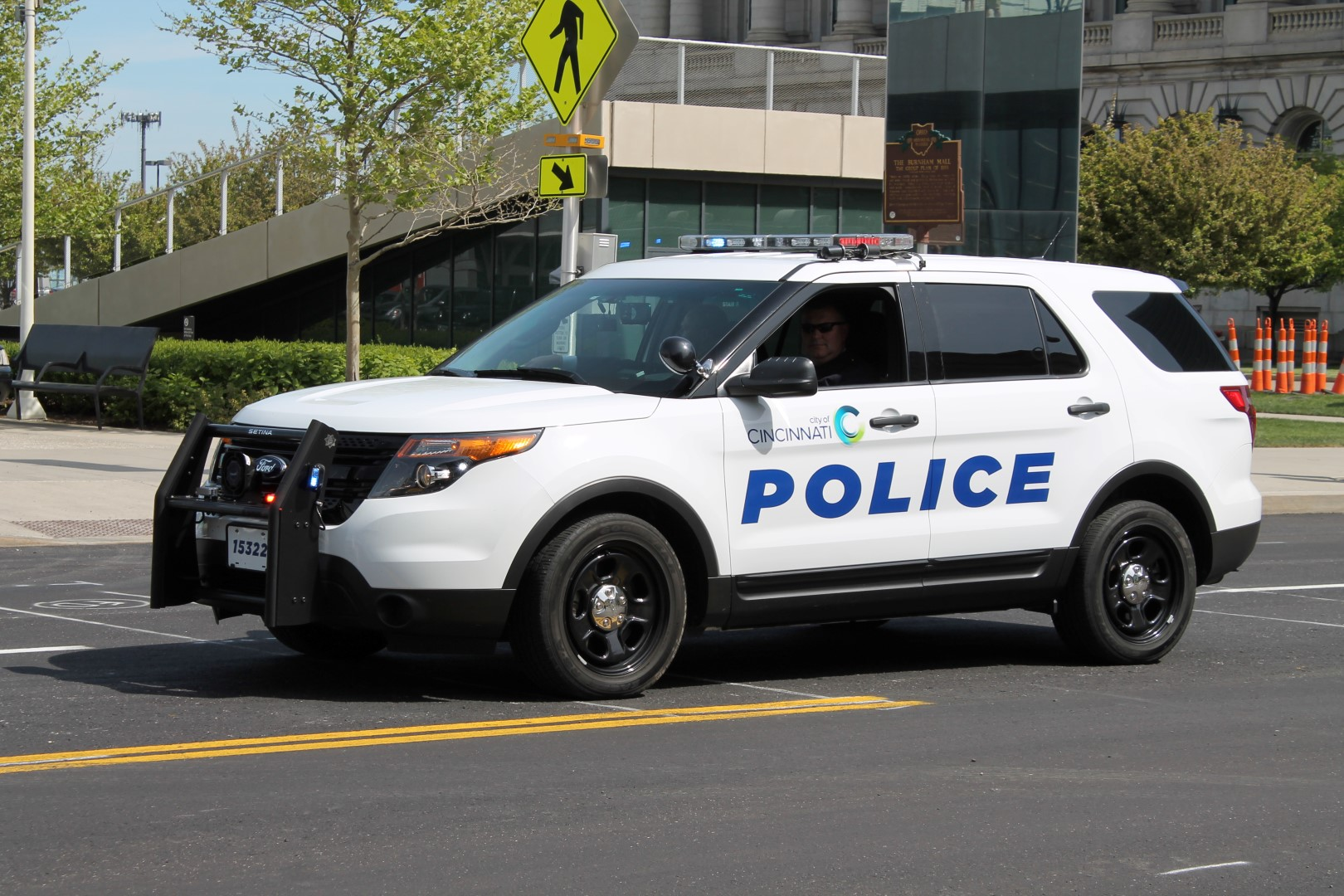
A Ford Explorer Police Interceptor belonging to the Cincinnati Police Department

The city of Cincinnati's emergency services for fire, rescue, EMS, hazardous materials and explosive ordnance disposal is handled by the Cincinnati Fire Department. On April 1, 1853, the Cincinnati Fire Department became the first paid professional fire department in United States. The Cincinnati Fire Department operates out of 26 fire stations, located throughout the city in 4 districts, each commanded by a district chief.

The Cincinnati Fire Department is organized into 4 bureaus: Operations, Personnel and Training, Administrative Services, and Fire Prevention. Each bureau is commanded by an assistant chief, who in turn reports to the chief of department.

The Cincinnati Police Department has more than 1,000 sworn officers. Before the riots of 2001, Cincinnati's overall crime rate had been dropping steadily and by 1995 had reached its lowest point since 1992, but with more murders and rapes. After the riot, violent crime increased, but crime has been on the decline since. The Cincinnati Police Department was featured on TLC's Police Women of Cincinnati and on A&E's reality show The First 48. Cincinnati had 71 homicides in 2023, down from 78 in 2022.

== Education ==
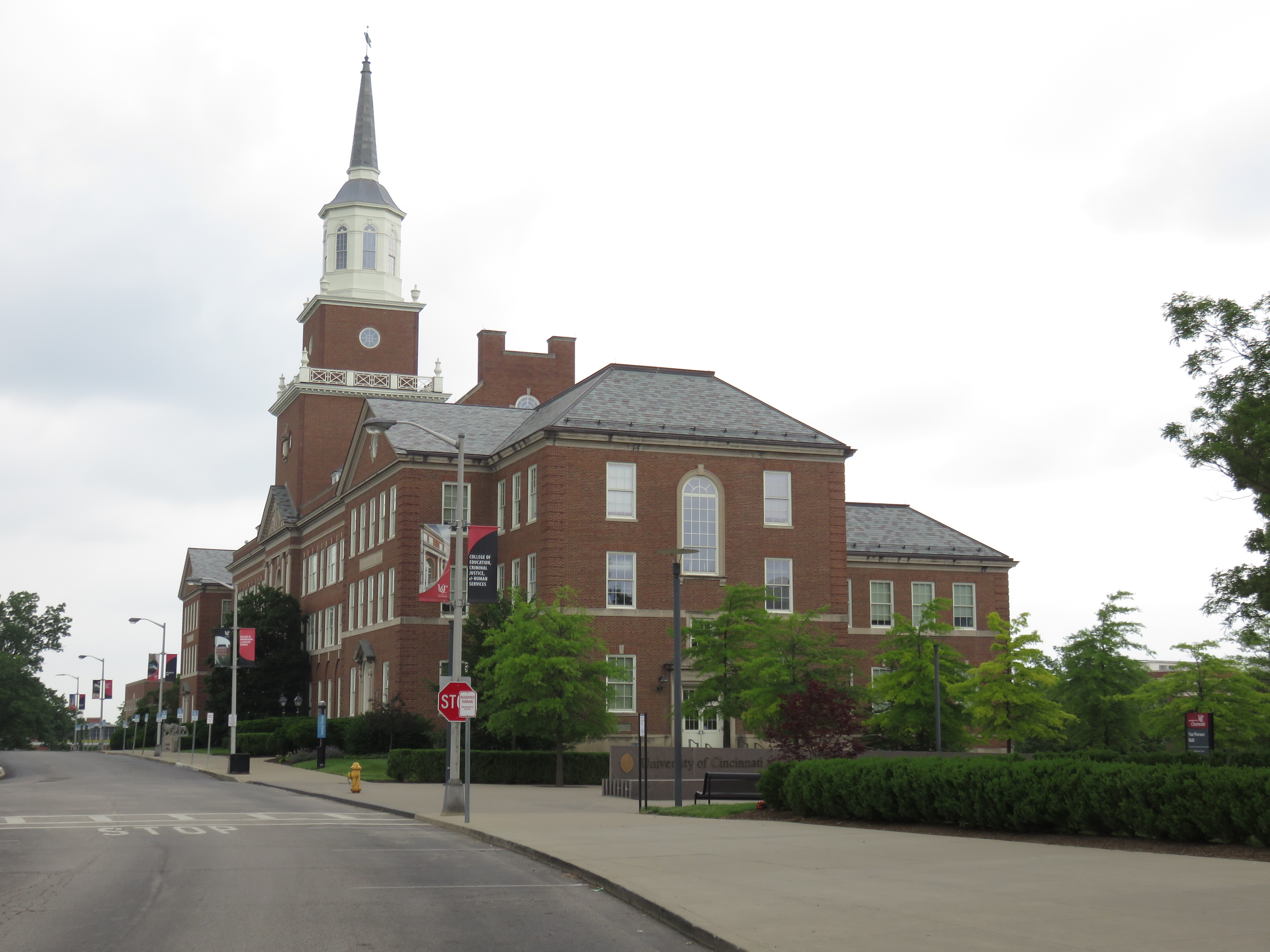
University of Cincinnati

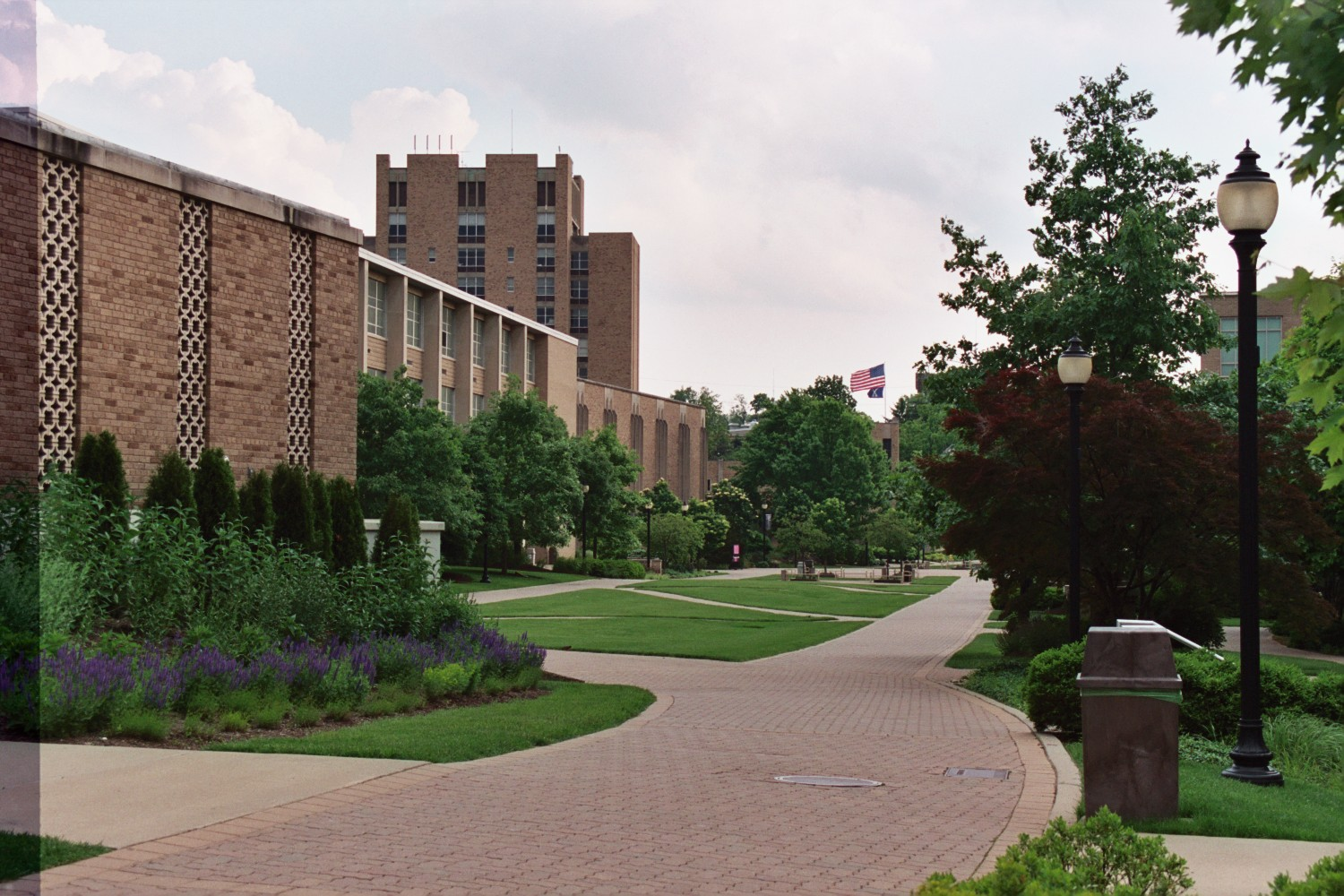
Xavier University

=== Primary and secondary education ===
Cincinnati Public Schools (CPS) include 18 high schools all with citywide acceptance. CPS, the second -largest school cluster by student population in Ohio, was the largest to have an overall 'effective' rating from the State. The district currently includes public Montessori schools, including the first public Montessori high school established in the United States, Clark Montessori. Cincinnati Public Schools' top-rated school is Walnut Hills High School, ranked 34th on the national list of best public schools by Newsweek. Walnut Hills offers 28 Advanced Placement courses. Cincinnati is also home to the first Kindergarten – 12th grade Arts School in the country, the School for Creative and Performing Arts.

The Jewish community has several schools, including the all-girl RITSS (Regional Institute for Torah and Secular Studies) high school, and the all-boy Yeshivas Lubavitch High School.

The Roman Catholic Archdiocese of Cincinnati operates sixteen high schools in Cincinnati, ten of which are single-sex. There are six all-female high schools and four all-male high schools in the city, with additional schools in the metro area.

=== Higher education ===
The Greater Cincinnati Collegiate Connection is a consortium consisting of all of the accredited colleges and universities in the Cincinnati area.

The University of Cincinnati is a public research university founded in 1819. It is the oldest institution of higher education in Cincinnati and has an annual enrollment of over 50,000 students, making it the second-largest university in Ohio. It is part of the University System of Ohio. The university's primary uptown campus and medical campus are located in the Heights and Corryville neighborhoods. The university is renowned in architecture and engineering, liberal arts, music, nursing, and social science. Notable divisions include the University of Cincinnati Medical Center and the College-Conservatory of Music.

Xavier University, a Roman Catholic college along with Mount St. Joseph University, was at one time affiliated with the Athenaeum of Ohio, the seminary of the Roman Catholic Archdiocese of Cincinnati. Xavier is primarily an undergraduate, liberal arts institution based in the Jesuit tradition. Antonelli College, a career training school, is based in Cincinnati with several satellite campuses in Ohio and Mississippi. Hebrew Union College – Jewish Institute of Religion (HUC-JIR), founded by Isaac Mayer Wise, is a seminary for training of Reform rabbis and others religious.

Cincinnati State Technical and Community College is a small technical and community college that includes the Midwest Culinary School. The Art Academy of Cincinnati, nicknamed AAC was founded as the 'McMicken School of Design in 1869. Also located in Cincinnati were Cincinnati Christian University and Chatfield College before they permanently closed in 2019 and 2023, respectively. Five hundred years since the Reformation Cincinnati provided a global distinguished lecture marking the layout of books and research for stirred city goers and the Cincinnati Art Museum staff built Albrecht Durer: The Age of Reformation and Renaissance, with more crafting by the university design, art, and architecture program given for the city.

=== Libraries ===
The city has an extensive library system, both the city's public libraries and university facilities. The Cincinnati and Hamilton County Public Library system was the second largest in the nation by number of holdings in 2016.

== Media ==
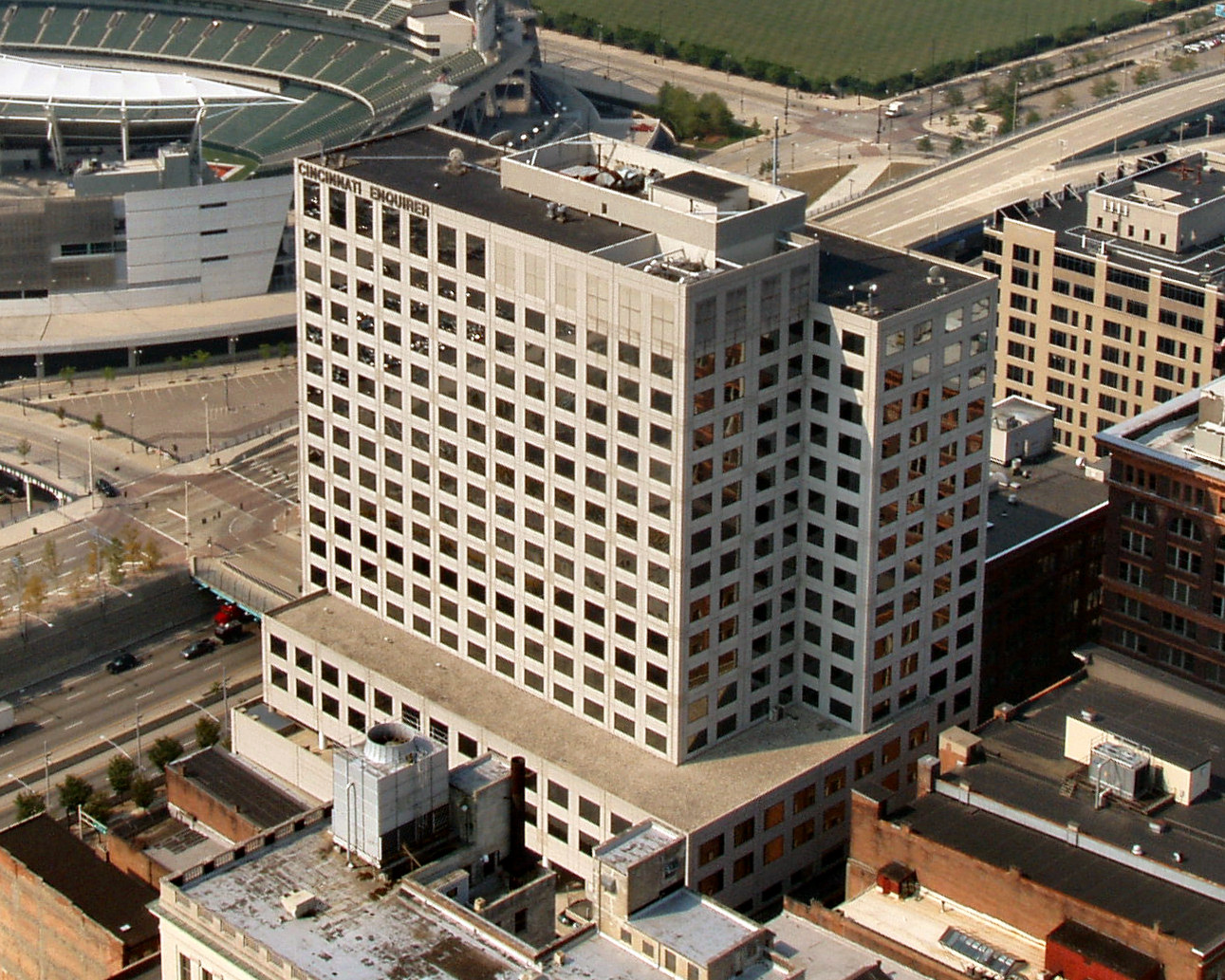
Headquarters of The Cincinnati Enquirer, founded in 1841

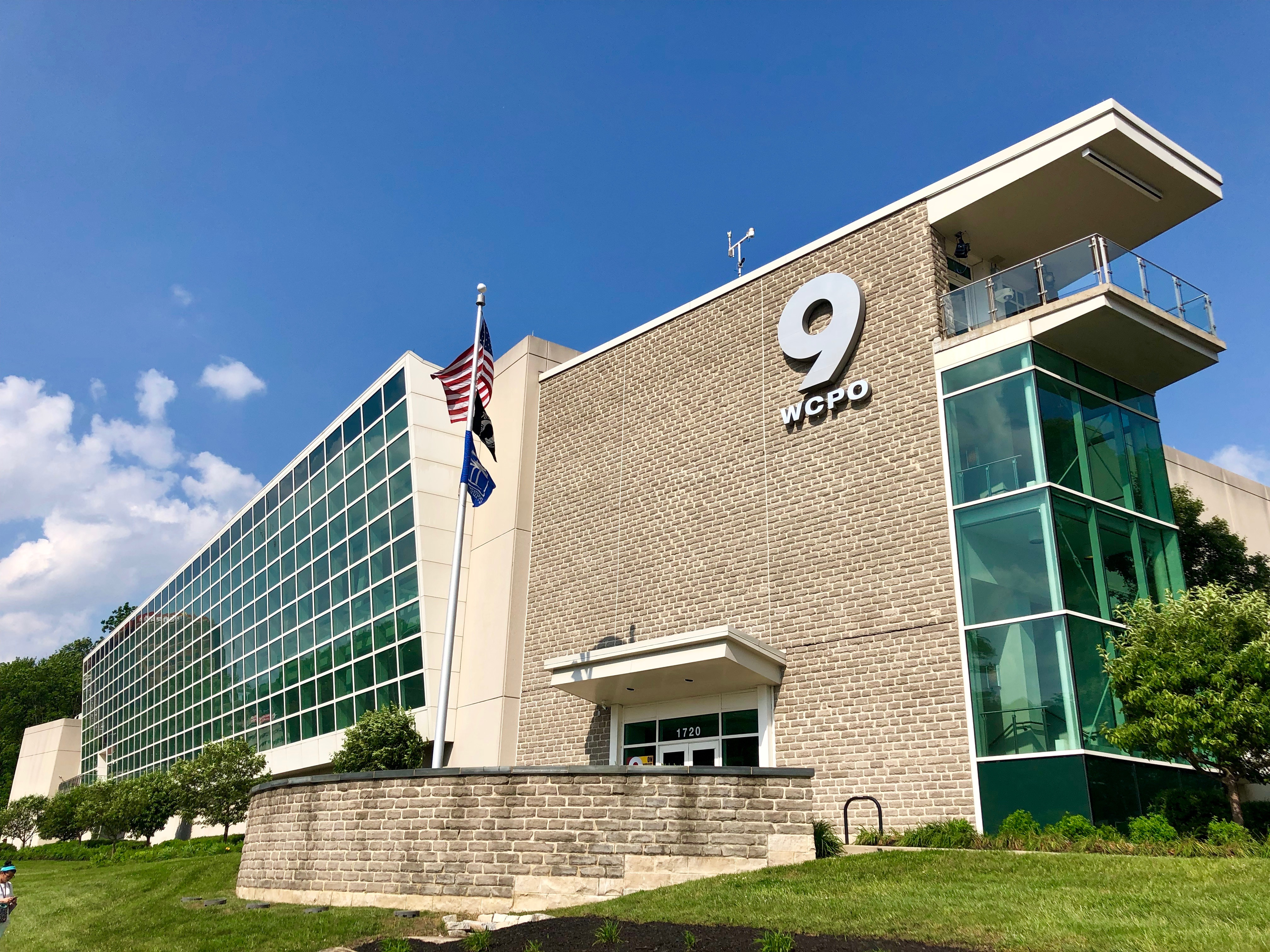
WCPO-TV studios in Mount Adams

=== Newspapers ===
Cincinnati's daily newspaper is The Cincinnati Enquirer, which was established in 1841. The city is home to several alternative, weekly, and monthly publications, among which are free weekly print magazine publications including CityBeat and La Jornada Latina. The city's weekly African American newspaper, The Cincinnati Herald, was founded by Gerald Porter in 1955 and purchased by Sesh Communications in 1996.

=== Television ===
According to Nielsen Media Research, Cincinnati is the 36th largest television market in the United States as of the 2021 television season. Twelve television stations broadcast from Cincinnati. Major commercial stations in the area include WLWT 5 (NBC), WCPO-TV 9 (ABC), WKRC-TV 12 (CBS, with CW on DT2), WXIX-TV 19 (Fox), WSTR-TV 64 (MyNetworkTV), and WBQC-LD 25 (Telemundo), which is a sister station to WXIX-TV through owner Gray Television's purchase of the station. WCET channel 48, now known as CET, is the United States' oldest licensed public television station (License #1, issued in 1951). It is now co-owned with WPTO 14, a satellite of WPTD in nearby Dayton.

=== Radio ===
As of September 2022, Cincinnati is the 33rd largest radio market in the United States, with an estimated 1.8 million listeners aged 12 and above. Major radio station operators include iHeartMedia and Cumulus Media. WLW and WCKY, both owned by iHeartMedia, are both clear-channel stations that broadcast at 50,000 watts, covering most of the eastern United States at night. Cincinnati Public Radio includes WVXU for news (an NPR member station) and WGUC for classical music.

== Transportation ==
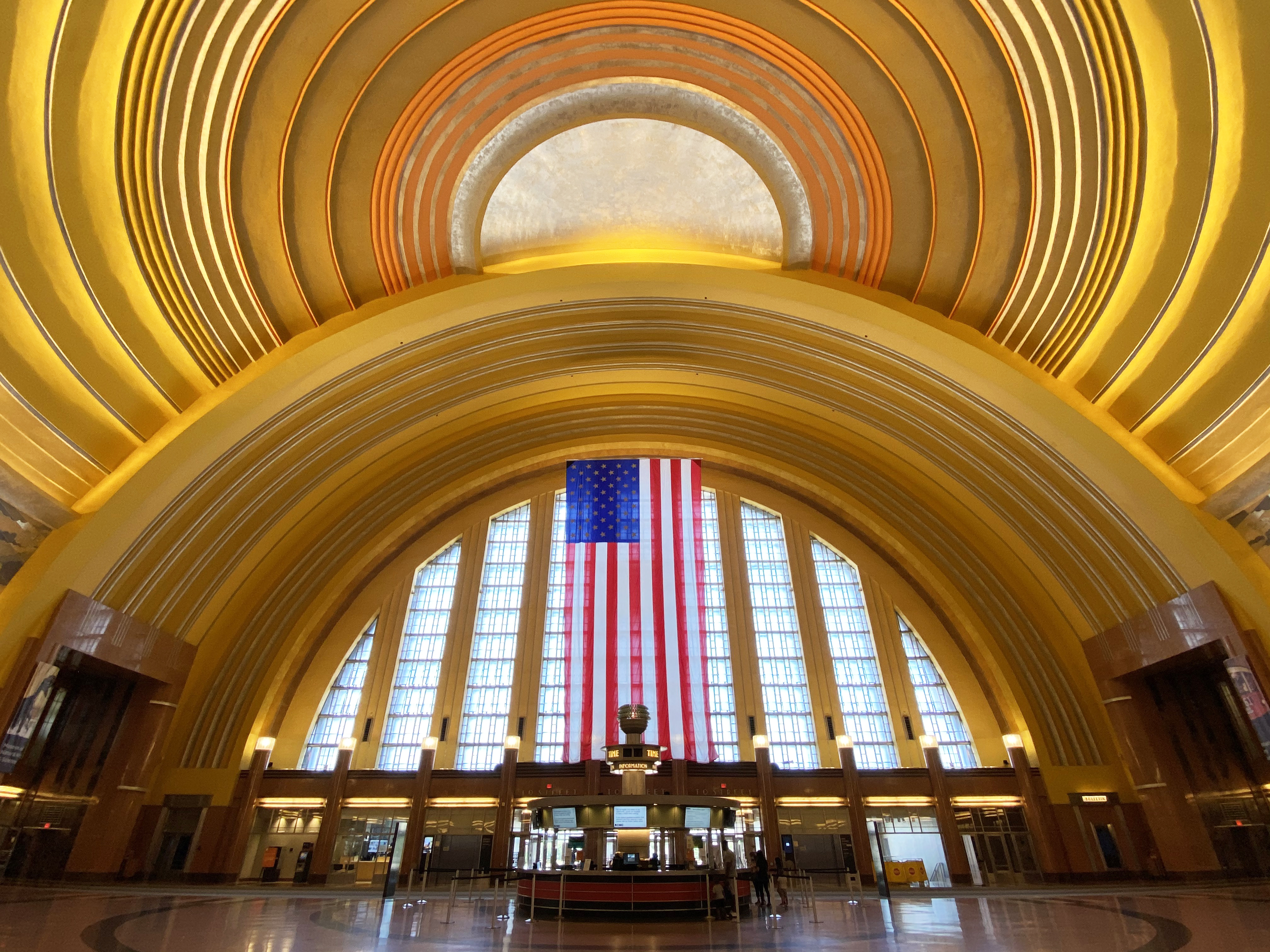
Cincinnati Union Terminal serves Amtrak's Cardinal line and houses several museums.

Cincinnati has several standard modes of transportation including sidewalks, roads, public transit, bicycle paths and airports. The city's hills preclude the regular street grid common to many cities built up in the 19th century, and outside of the downtown basin, regular street grids are rare except for in patches of flat land where they are small and oriented according to topography.

Most trips are made by car, with transit and bicycles having a relatively low share of total trips; in a region of just over 2 million people, less than 80,000 trips were made with transit on an average day in 2012. Like many other Midwestern cities, however, bicycle use grew rapidly in the 2000s and 2010s. The city of Cincinnati has a higher than average percentage of households without a car. In 2015, 19.3 percent of Cincinnati households lacked a car and the figure increased slightly, to 21.2 percent, in 2016. The national average was 8.7 percent in 2016. Cincinnati averaged 1.3 cars per household in 2016, compared to a national average of 1.8.

The development of a light rail system had long been a goal for Cincinnati, with several proposals emerging over many decades. The city grew rapidly during its streetcar era of the late 19th and early 20th centuries, and is today served by the Connector. In 1917, citizens voted to spend $6 million (~$122 million in 2025) to build the Cincinnati Subway. The subway was planned to be a 16-mile (26 km) loop around the city via St. Bernard, Norwood, Oakley and Hyde Park. World War I delayed commencement of construction until 1920 and inflation raised the cost to over $13 million (~$158 million in 2025), causing the Oakley portion never to be built. Mayor Murray Seasongood, who took office later in the decade, argued it would cost too much money to finish the system, and construction stalled after the Wall Street Crash of 1929.

=== Public transportation ===
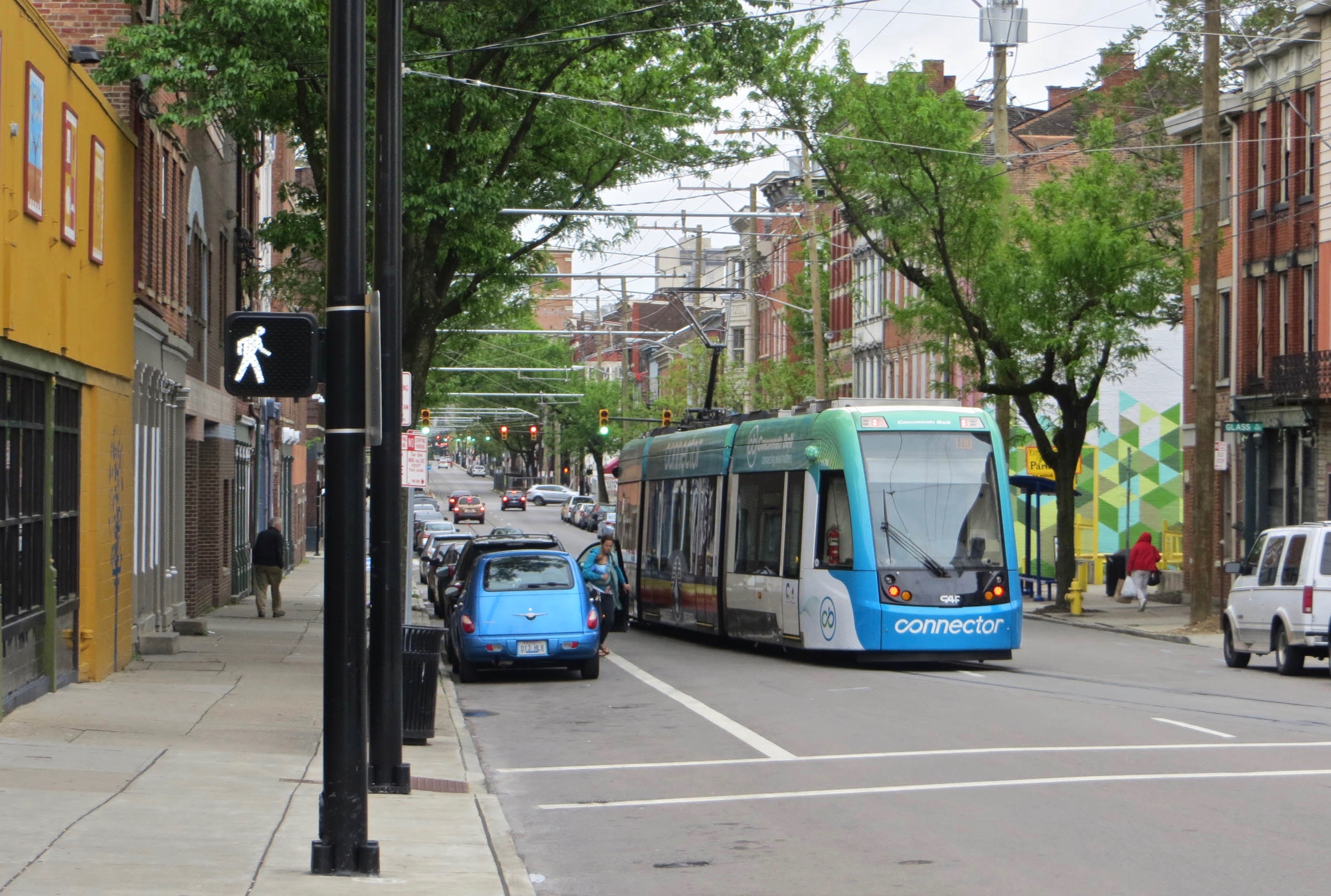
The Connector streetcar line was established in 2016.

The Connector streetcar line in Downtown and Over-the-Rhine opened for service on September 9, 2016, crossing directly above the unfinished subway on Central Parkway downtown. Today the streetcar boasts over 3.5 miles (5.6 km) of track and 16 hours of service per day on weekdays. It had an annual ridership of over 846,000 in 2022.

Cincinnati is served by the Southwest Ohio Regional Transit Authority (SORTA), the Transit Authority of Northern Kentucky (TANK) and the Clermont Transportation Connection. SORTA and TANK primarily operate 40-foot (12 m) diesel buses, though some lines are served by longer articulated or hybrid-engine buses. SORTA buses operate under the "Metro" name and are referred to by locals as such.

A system of public staircases guides pedestrians up and down the city's many hills. In addition to practical use linking hillside neighborhoods, the 400 stairways provide visitors with scenic views of the Cincinnati area.

Cincinnati is served by Amtrak's Cardinal, an intercity passenger train which makes three weekly trips in each direction between Chicago and New York City through Cincinnati Union Terminal.

=== Roadways ===
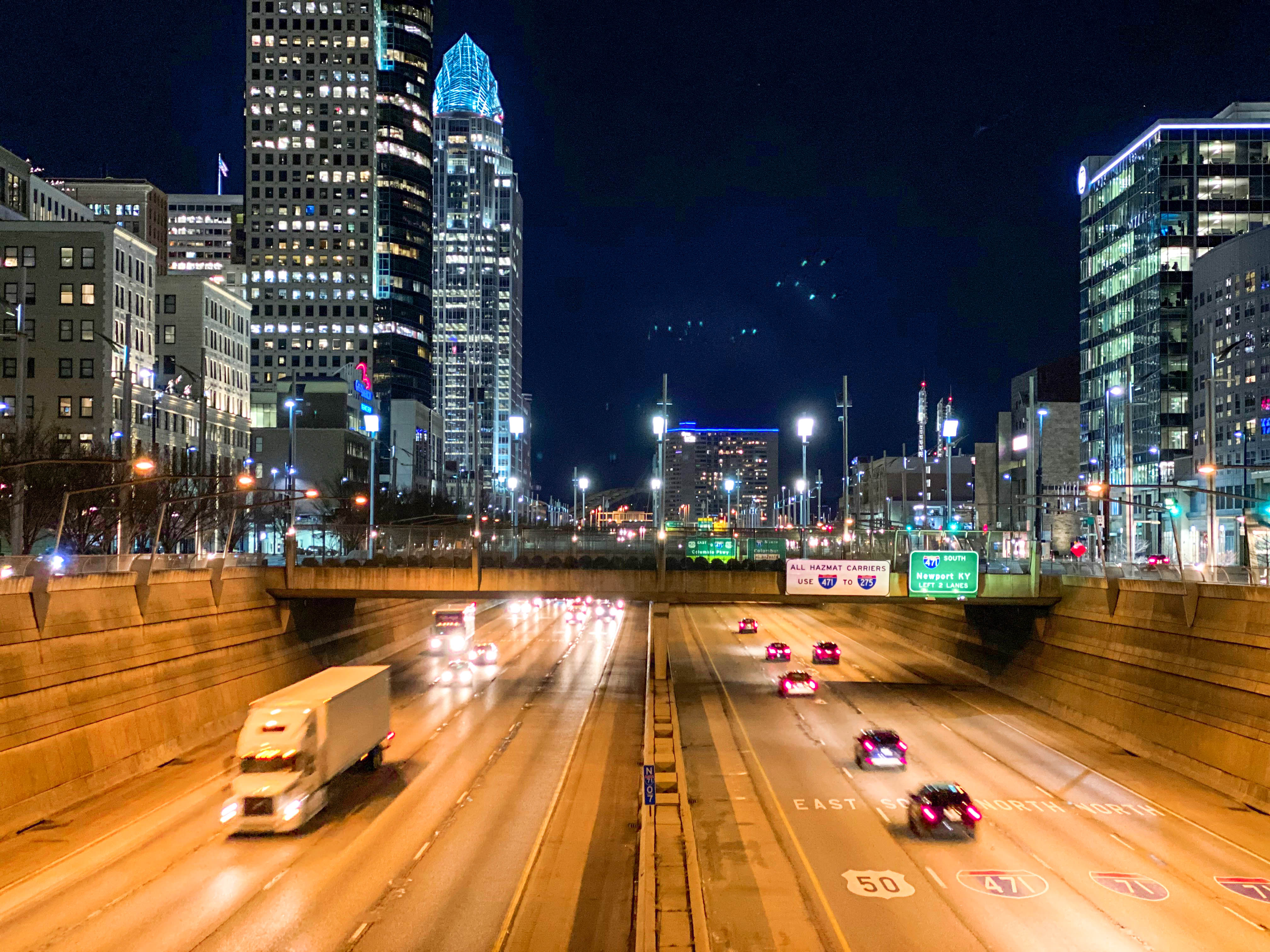
Fort Washington Way, one of Cincinnati's major freeways

Bus traffic is heavy in Cincinnati. Several motor coach companies operate out of Cincinnati, making trips within the Midwest and beyond. The city has a beltway, Interstate 275 (which is the third-longest beltway overall in the United States at 85 miles or 137 kilometers) and a spur, Interstate 471, to Kentucky. It is also served by Interstate 71, Interstate 74, Interstate 75 and numerous U.S. highways: US 22, US 25, US 27, US 42, US 50, US 52, and US 127. The Riverfront Transit Center, built underneath 2nd Street, is about the size of eight football fields. It is only used for sporting events and school field trips. At its construction, it was designed for public transit buses, charter buses, school buses, city coach buses, light rail, and possibly commuter rail. When not in use for sporting events, it is closed off and rented to a private parking vendor.

=== Air ===
The city is served by Cincinnati/Northern Kentucky International Airport (IATA: CVG) which is located in Hebron, Kentucky. The airport is a focus city for Allegiant Air and Frontier Airlines as well as a global cargo hub for both Amazon Air and DHL Aviation. The airport offers non-stop passenger service to over 50 destinations in North America and to European cities including Paris and London. CVG is the 5th busiest airport in the United States by cargo traffic and is additionally the fastest-growing cargo airport in North America.

Other airports include Cincinnati Municipal Lunken Airport (IATA: LUK) which has daily service on commercial charter flights.

== Sister cities ==
Cincinnati's sister cities are:

- Amman, Jordan
- Gifu, Japan
- Harare, Zimbabwe
- Kharkiv, Ukraine
- Liuzhou, China
- Munich, Germany
- Mysore, India
- Nancy, France
- New Taipei, Taiwan

== See also ==
- City Plan for Cincinnati
- National Register of Historic Places listings in Cincinnati
- USS Cincinnati, 5 ships
- Vine Street, Cincinnati
