= Holiday Junction =

Annual model train display in Cincinnati, Ohio, US

Holiday Junction Featuring the Duke Energy Holiday Trains is a rail-themed holiday event held annually since 1996 at the Cincinnati Museum Center at Union Terminal in Cincinnati, Ohio. Its main attraction is a much older model railroad display, which is owned by CSX Transportation and sponsored by Duke Energy.

== Duke Energy Holiday Trains ==
The Duke Energy Holiday Trains are the event's most well-known model railroad display. While located in the Duke Energy building in downtown Cincinnati, it was maintained by a team of employees and retirees of the Cincinnati Gas & Electric Company (CG&E) and its successors, Cinergy and Duke Energy. The O scale display measures 36 1/2 by 47 1/2 feet (11.1 m × 14.5 m) and includes about 300 train cars and 50 locomotives running on more than 1,000 feet (300 m) of track, representing 9 miles (14 km) at scale. It is powered by a 12-volt system. It depicts the Cumberland Subdivision between the late 1930s and early 1950s. A rural station within the display is modeled on Point of Rocks station in Maryland.

The Baltimore and Ohio Railroad (B&O) originally built it in 1936 at a cost of $50,000. It went on tour throughout the B&O's service area until 1946, when the railroad decided to end the tour. It planned to place the model on permanent display at the B&O Railroad Museum in Baltimore. However, the B&O partnered with CG&E to keep the display in Cincinnati in the lobby of the utility's headquarters, where the event became a popular annual Christmas tradition. The event ran 41 days each year. Admission was free, and organizers handed out popcorn and later cookies to children in attendance. Over the years, the display has been expanded and embellished with many decorative scenes. The first building, a slaughterhouse, was added in 1939. In 2010, the display attracted 300,000 visitors, bringing the total attendance over 65 seasons to more than 9 million. In 2011, Duke moved the display to the museum center, which incorporated it into the existing Holiday Junction event. Original portions of the display continue to be owned by the B&O's successor, CSX Transportation.

== Other model train displays ==
Holiday Junction also features a 20-by-30-foot (6.1 m × 9.1 m) G scale model and an HO scale model built by local model railroad clubs.

The museum center also houses the Cincinnati History Museum's Cincinnati In Motion exhibit, a scale model of the city that includes model streetcars.

== See also ==
- EnterTRAINment Junction
