= Frederick W. Garber =

American architect (1877–1950)

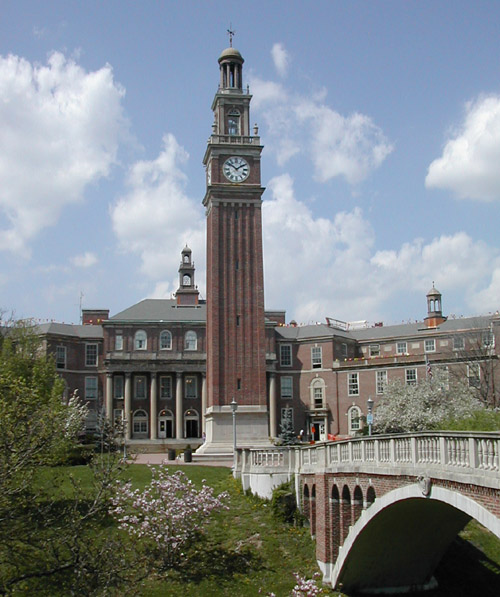
The Withrow High School's entrance in 2007 shows part of the school's design on a 30-acre campus

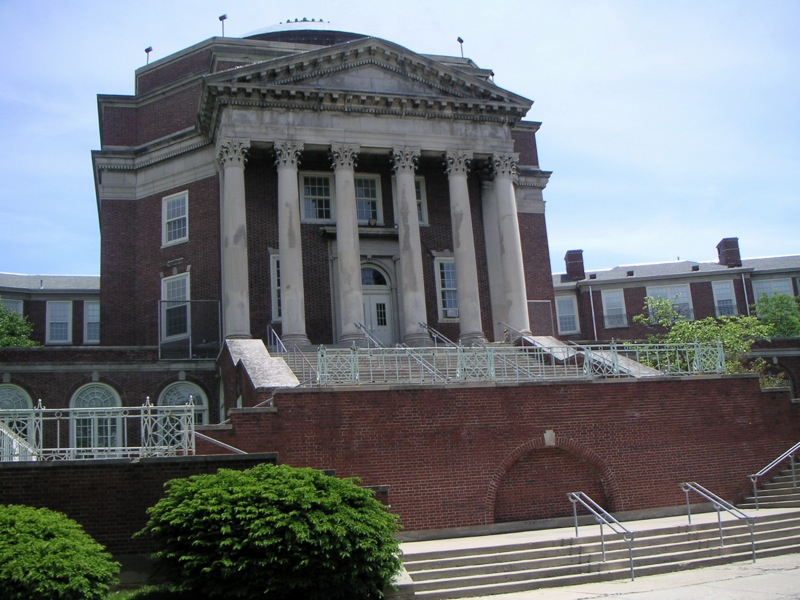
Walnut Hills High School in Cincinnati, Ohio, modeled after Thomas Jefferson's rotunda at the University of Virginia

Frederick W. Garber (July 21, 1877 – August 7, 1950) was an American architect in Cincinnati, Ohio and the principal architect in the Garber & Woodward firm with Clifford B. Woodward (1880–1932). The firm operated from 1904 until it was dissolved in 1933 Their work has been described as in the Beaux-Arts tradition and included buildings on the University of Cincinnati campuses, schools, hospitals, commercial buildings, "fine residences" and public housing.

== Background ==
Garber was the eldest son of Frederick H.C. Garber who was born in Hanover Germany and worked at a German newspaper. Garber and Woodward were students together, business partners in their architectural firm, and brothers-in-law. They attended Cincinnati Technical School, worked as draftsmen for Elzner & Anderson in Cincinnati; and attended a two-year course in architecture at M.I.T. (studying with Beaux-Arts-trained Professor C.D. Despradelle). Garber won a Rotch Scholarship and studied abroad. He may have traveled with Bertram Goodhue while in Europe, as well as with a partner in the firm of Cass Gilbert.

Woodward was born in the Walnut Hills area of Cincinnati and spent most of his life in the Glendale section of town. He was the third son of Henry L. Woodward who worked for First National Bank.

Garber was a fellow of the AIA and a member of its board of directors, a member of the Corporation of M.I.T., and a member of the visiting committee of the art and archaeological department of Princeton University.

== Firm ==
The Garber & Woodward firm's design for Withrow High School (1915–1919) at 2488 Madison Road in Hyde Park included "an agricultural section with conservatories and a poultry house, a manual-training shop, and a fine gymnasium" on a 30-acre (120,000 m^{2}) campus Garber & Woodward "made the difficult challenge of a ravine across the front of the site into a dramatic asset by means of a Palladian bridge leading to the tall bell tower, which resembles the campanile in St. Mark's Piazza in Venice. The main building is graceful, balanced composition with horizontal lines. Two matching wings are attached at a slight angle so that they spread across the wide entrance court to embrace the visitor."

The firm collaborated with Cass Gilbert and John Russell Pope of New York on the design of the Fourth and Vine Tower and on the Cincinnati Gas & Electric Co. (Cinergy/Duke Energy) headquarters (Duke Energy Building).

Garber & Woodward designed the Phelps Apartment House (The Phelps) at 506 East Fourth Street for the Taft family and remodeled the Baum-Longworth-Sinton-Taft House as the Taft Museum, after the deaths of Charles Phelps and Anna Sinton Taft (ca. 1930). The firm "restored much of the Victorianized interior according to a fairly authentic but Deco-flavored Federal style." The firm also designed the Anna Louise Inn for Girls (originally the Union Bethel) on Pike St. near the Taft Museum and a work that may have been carried out in association with Elzner & Anderson. Mr. and Mrs. "Charles P. Taft" also funded construction of the operation for the Cincinnati Union Bethel (CUB) to run a non-profit offering 120 "working young women, who had come to Cincinnati seeking employment from various rural areas, both security and affordable housing" on Third and Lytle streets.

During the Great Depression F.W. Garber was head of the Associated Architects responsible for the design of the early WPA Projects: Laurel Homes and Lincoln Court (formerly on Ezzard Charles Drive) west of Music Hall (replaced by City West ca. 2002–2003), and later the English Woods and Winton Terrace housing projects.

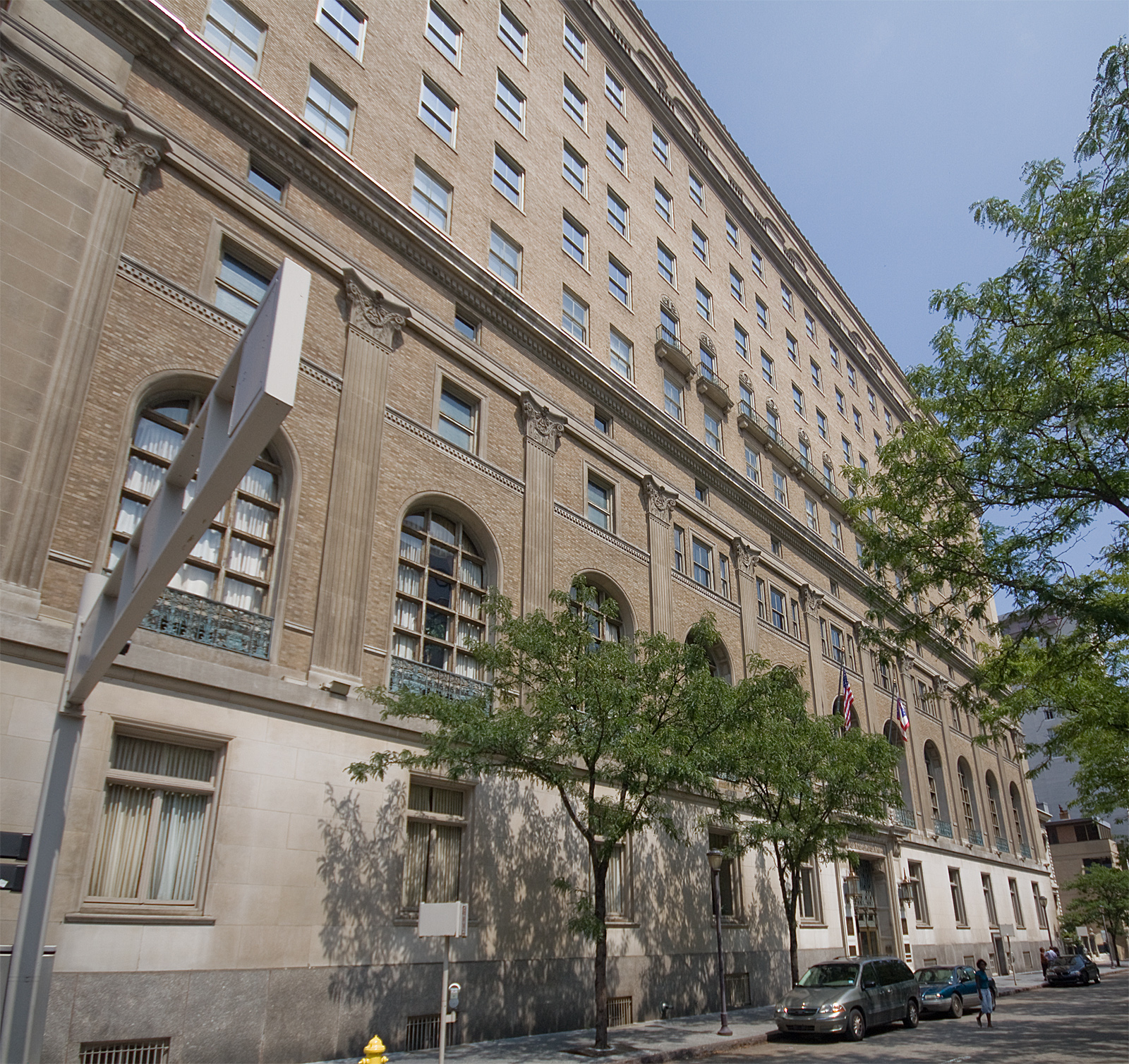
The Phoenix Building (1924) in Cincinnati, now known as the Cincinnati Club

Garber's firm designed the Phoenix Building, now known as the Cincinnati Club, a 1924 former hotel and private club in Cincinnati, Ohio that is now used as a banquet hall. It was listed in the National Register on January 11, 1985 and is also recognized as a historic landmark by the Miami Historical Preservation Association.

The firm's Chamber of Commerce Building on 1-11 Capitol Street in Charleston, West Virginia was later demolished. It was a six floor rigid frame steel structure user as a commercial office.

The nine-story Vernon Manor Hotel was built in 1924 the Avondale neighborhood "for wealthy Cincinnatians longing to get away from the hustle and bustle of downtown". Perched atop one of the cities' Seven Hills it overlooks the city skyline. It was featured in the 1986 film Rainman starring Tom Cruise and Dustin Hoffman.

Garber & Woodward were involved in planning with landscape architect John Nolen for a recreation center in the Mariemont project development, "an essential component" but after Nolen's services were terminated the commission was never fulfilled, and it was designed by New York architect George B. deGersdorff instead who was an old classmate and friend of Charles Livingood. Architect Edward Kruckemeyer worked with Garber & Woodward for a time before joining with another MIT classmate, Charles Strong in 1915 after they traveled together in Europe.

Garber practiced with John Postler and Lawrence Lefken from 1933 to 1938 and on his own from 1939 to 1952. His son Woodie (Woodward) Garber also had a firm "with a more contemporary approach" from 1949 to 1971.

== Legacy (Woodie Garber) ==
Frederick William Garber's son Woodie Garber (often spelled Woody) took a more contemporary approach to architecture. He designed Cincinnati's first post World War II main library building at the corner of Eighth and Vine using a plan with a lot of open space. The building is "the cornerstone of the present Main Library complex". He also designed Sander Hall at the University of Cincinnati (since imploded). He also authored a 1973 guide called "An architectural program for adult corrections facilities for Cincinnati and Hamilton County".

=== Projects ===
- Main Library building, Cincinnati
- Moore House in Cincinnati, a 5,160-square-foot (479 m^{2}) wood-and-glass house on a 5.4-acre (22,000 m^{2}) site (1952). It was being video taped, documented and salvaged prior to demolition in 2007.
- Woodie Garber residence Glendale, Ohio
- Procter Hall, University of Cincinnati (1968), used for the College of Nursing.
- All Saints Chapel addition, Christ Church Glendale (1959–1960)

== Frederick W. Garber and Woodward & Garber projects ==
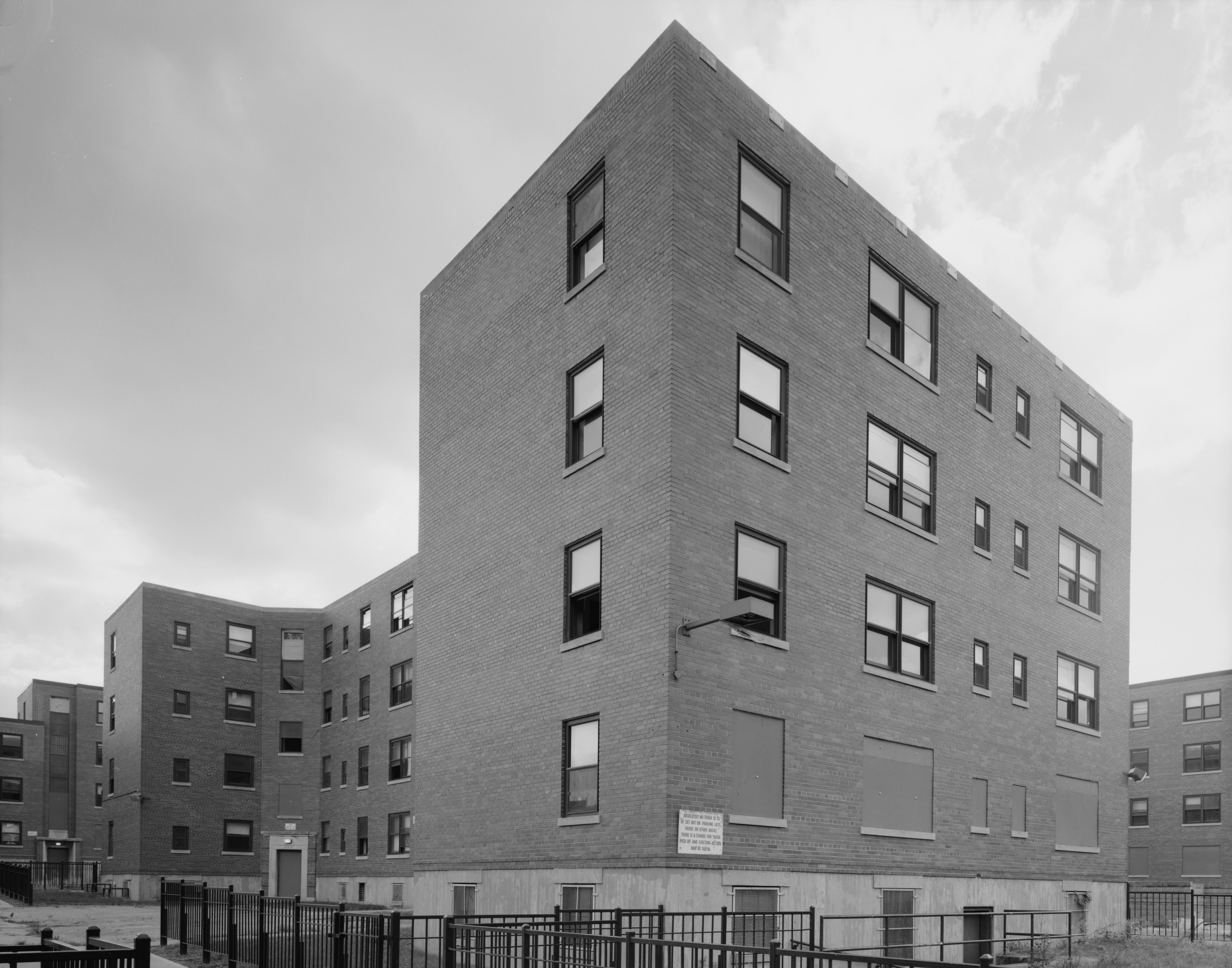
Building B in the Laurel Homes Historic District

=== Residences, churches, and other buildings ===
- William Cooper Procter's Glendale, Ohio residence (1904) and his summer house in Devon, L.I. (1909).
- Anna Louise Inn (1909) on the 300 block of Lytle Street in Cincinnati's central business district, a five-story concrete and brick building for women who came to Cincinnati to find employment
- Price Hill Library (1909) at 3215 Warsaw Avenue is a French Renaissance style brick and limestone building with a tin decked roof withslate slopes, fleur-de-lis grid over the doors, bird-head door handles, and cherry wood shelves. It was funded by the Andrew Carnegie Foundation, and is a branch of the Public Library of Cincinnati and Hamilton County system.
- Avondale Library (1913) in Cincinnati, a Spanish Colonial style building featuring a Rookwood tile entry, decorative iron work, and a domed ceiling. A Rookwood drinking fountain was presented to the branch by the Avondale Improvement Association to mark its opening at 3566 Reading Road. It was funded by the Andrew Carnegie Foundation
- Taft Museum (ca. 1930) remodel of the residence into a museum.
- Bethlehem Methodist Church (now Calvary United) in Evanston, a "somewhat austere but handsome and site-specific work in the Collegiate Gothic Revival style"
- Christ Church Episcopal Chapel, Fourth Street
- Elks Temple (later Crosley Square, but now home to a charter school), NEC Ninth and Elm streets.
- Aurora Public Library, a Renaissance style building at 414 Second Street in Aurora, Indiana. Listed on the National Register of Historic Places in 1993.
- additions to J.W. McLaughlin's Cincinnati Art Museum including the Emery, French, and Hanna wings
- Addition to Herbert Greer French House (1930), expanded the east addition after demolition of a smokehouse and a greenhouse.

=== Commercial and apartment buildings ===
- F. W. Woolworth Building in Lexington, Kentucky
- Phoenix Building/Cincinnati Club (Piatt Park Center) an 11-story neo-classical building designed by Garber & Woodward with Samuel Hannaford & Sons (1924)
- Dixie Terminal Building (1921) on Fourth Street in downtown Cincinnati including a "superb Adamesque barrel vault"
- The Vernon Manor Hotel (1924), a nine-story English Renaissance Revival "modeled after the stately Hatfield House in England" on the 400 block of Oak Street in Cincinnati's Avondale neighborhood. Renovated in 1999.
- Laurel Homes Historic District list on the National Register of Historic Places in 1987. (mostly demolished in 2002)
- Several public buildings in Wyoming, Ohio (near Glendale)
- Milford, Ohio National Bank
- Chamber of Commerce Building in Charleston, West Virginia
- Cincinnati Gas and Electric Building (1929) on East Fourth Street and Main Street in Cincinnati, an 18-floor Neoclassical building designed with John Russell Pope
- Phelps Apartment House (The Phelps), a 13-floor beaux-arts apartment building on the 500 block of East Fourth Street (1926)

=== Schools ===
- Walnut Hills High School, "based on Thomas Jefferson's University of Virginia Rotunda" in Walnut Hills overlooking Victory Parkway in Evanston (1929–1931)
- Western Hills High School General Contractor D. Meinken & Sons Cincinnati Ohio
- Westwood Public School (1909) (now Westwood Elementary and undergoing renovation)
- Guilford School on E. Fourth St. opposite Lytle Park (1911)
- Frederick Douglass and Rothenberg Schools (1914), and a High School in Lexington, Kentucky.
- Withrow High School (1919) on Madison Rd. opposite Erie Avenue
- Rothenberg School was named after Louis Rothenberg its first principal.
- Lafayette Bloom School (1915) 1941 Baymiller Street General Contractor D. Meinken & Sons Cincinnati Ohio
- Hartwell High School General Contractor D. Meinken & Sons Cincinnati Ohio

=== University of Cincinnati buildings ===
- Nippert Stadium (1912) (since remodeled)
- Dyer Hall (1931) at the University of Cincinnati, a wing of the Teachers College

== See also ==
- Samuel Hannaford
