= Rothenberg School =

Historic school building in Cincinnati, Ohio

Coordinates: 39°06′51″N 84°30′46″W

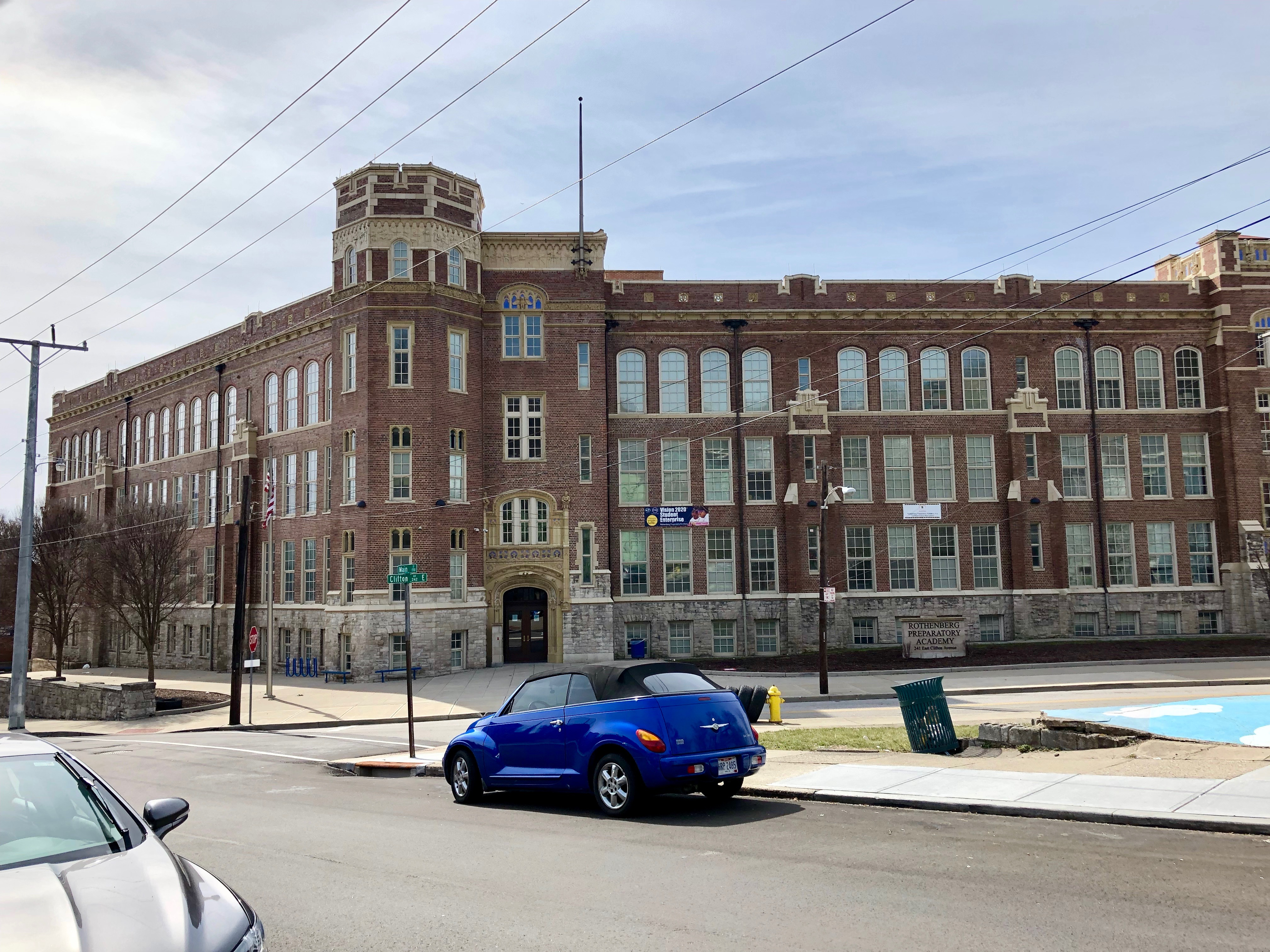
Rothenberg School in 2019

Rothenberg School is a historic school building in Cincinnati, Ohio, United States, designed by local architect Frederick W. Garber's firm, which was also responsible for Withrow School, Walnut Hills High School, Western Hills High School and Westwood School (now Westwood elementary). It was named after the school's first principal, Louis Rothenberg, part of a Jewish family.

After a debate about the school's future, it was saved in 2009 and opened for use in 2013 as a neighborhood school and community learning center. Over-the-Rhine residents and other stakeholders discussed how to proceed and a working group was assembled with assistance from the Community Building Institute to bring together "neighborhood and community council representatives, school staff, Rothenberg partners, parents and students to decide what types of programs should be offered in a renovated facility".

The historic brick building at Main Street and Clifton Avenue known locally as "Bird's' Eye" was scheduled for demolition and replacement, but Cincinnati Public Schools (CPS) reconsidered after finding that the increased cost of saving and renovating the building would be minimal.
