= Westwood Elementary School =

Westwood Elementary School may refer to:

- Westwood Elementary in Cincinnati, Ohio
- Westwood Elementary School (Prince George) in British Columbia, Canada
- Westwood Elementary School in Zimmerman, Minnesota
- Westwood Elementary School in Bloomington, Minnesota
