= Phoenix Building/Cincinnati Club =

- U.S. National Register of Historic Places
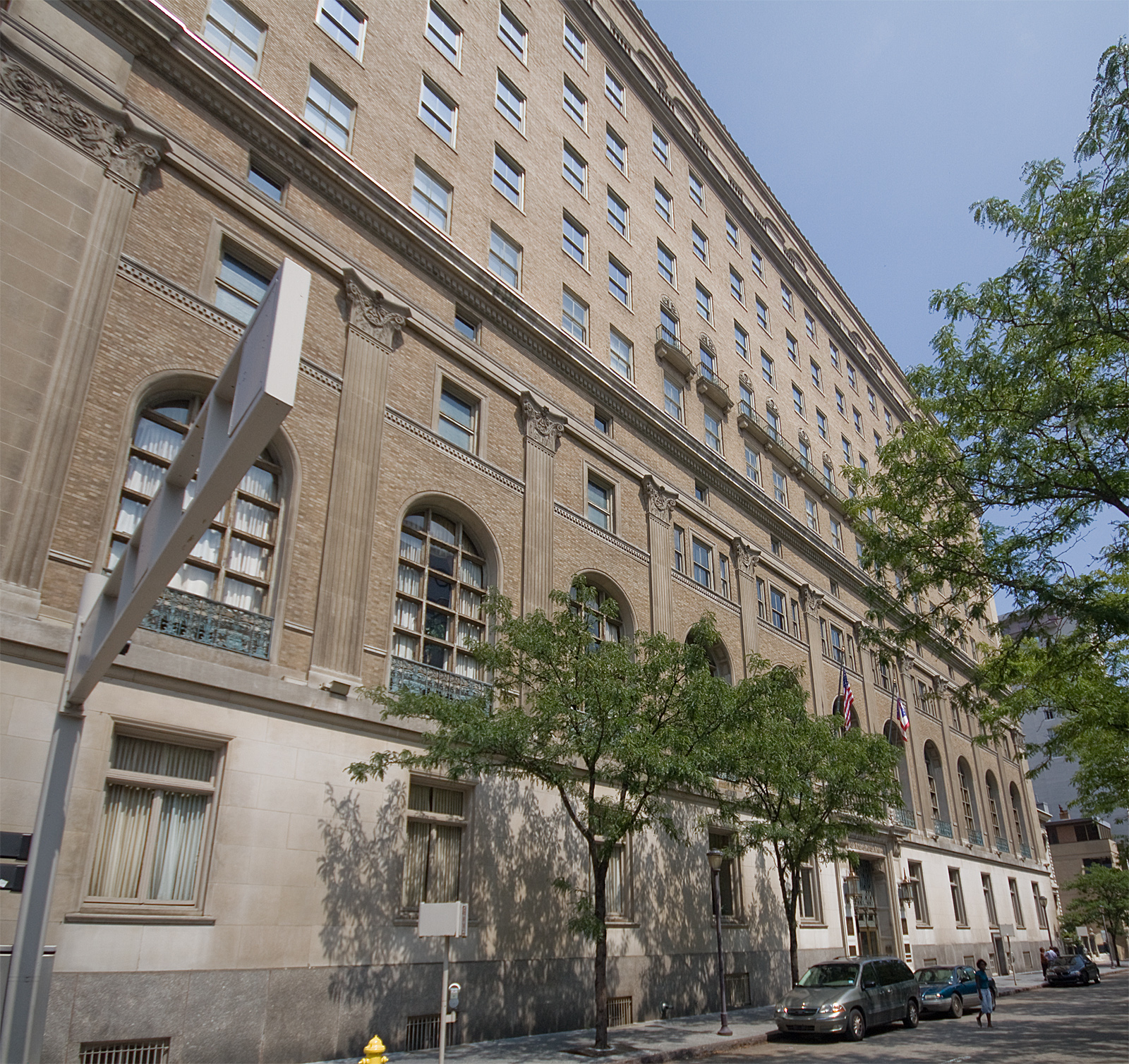

- Location within Ohio Location within the United States
- Location: 30 Garfield Pl. and 812 Race St., Cincinnati, Ohio
- Coordinates: 39°6′16.16″N 84°30′53.36″W
- Built: 1924
- Architect: Garber & Woodward and Samuel Hannaford & Sons
- Architectural style: Late 19th and 20th Century Revivals and Other
- NRHP reference No.: 85000068
- Added to NRHP: January 11, 1985

The Phoenix Building and Cincinnati Club are two historic buildings in downtown Cincinnati, Ohio, United States. The membership of these two clubs was chiefly Jewish.

Located at 812 Race Street, the Phoenix Building was constructed in 1893, designed by prominent Cincinnati architect Samuel Hannaford, the same architect who designed Cincinnati Music Hall, and intended as the home of an organization for Jewish businessmen. It was listed in the National Register on January 11, 1985, and it is also recognized as a historic landmark by the Miami Historical Preservation Association. It was built in the architectural style of the Italian Renaissance, featuring Tiffany Glass windows and purchased by the neighboring Cincinnati Club, located at 30 Garfield Place, in 1911. The Cincinnati Club later sold the building in 1983. It later became a fine dining restaurant 1988–2008, and continues as a private banquet facility.

The Cincinnati Club operated as a hotel and private businessman's club was also built by Garber and Woodward, Frederick W. Garber's firm.

The two properties are separate buildings and each are currently used as a banquet hall for private events.

== Phoenix Club ==
The Phoenix Club was established as a "German Organization of Jewish Men," and the by-laws provided that all proceedings, records and entertainments be in the German language.

A 1909 report of The Cincinnati Industrial Magazine states "The Phoenix Club is the leading Jewish social organization of the city, but movement of wealthy families to the outlying districts made the maintenance of the clubhouse too great an expense. The property was sold for $185,000 and will be remodeled into a theater, with restaurant and roof garden."
