= EnterTRAINment Junction =

Indoor model railroad display in West Chester Township, Ohio

Coordinates: 39°21′04.4″N 84°22′30.4″W

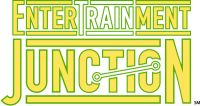
- EnterTRAINment Junction Logo
- Interactive map of EnterTRAINment Junction
- Location: 7379 Squire Court, West Chester Township, Ohio
- Opened: August 1, 2008
- Closed: January 5, 2025
- Owner: Don Oeters
- General manager: Bill Balfour
- Operating season: Year round
- Area: 25,000 sq ft
- Website: www.entertrainmentjunction.com

EnterTRAINment Junction was an indoor model railroad display located in West Chester Township, Ohio. This 25,000 square foot (2,300 square metres) display consisted of over 90 G-scale trains encompassing the early era of American railroading, the middle era, and the modern era. The facility also included the American Railroading Museum, an expo center, and a fun house.

== History ==
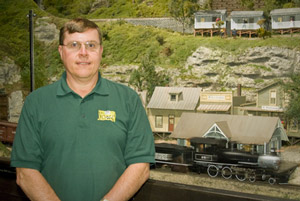
Don Oeters in 2008

EnterTRAINment Junction was a result of the vision of its owner, Don Oeters. Oeters, a successful businessman and model railroad enthusiast, wanted to create the world's largest model train display in an amusement park-like setting. He commissioned Bruce Robinson, whose resume' includes the Ripley's Believe It or Not! Museums, to create the concept drawings for this massive project. Major construction began in early 2007 with the first track being installed in the Spring of the same year. EnterTRAINment Junction opened to the public on August 1, 2008. On June 18, 2024, it was announced that EnterTRAINment Junction would be permanently closed down around January 2025. It was later confirmed in December 2024 that most of the assets would be transported to Chattanooga, Tennessee and reopened under the new name The Motion Museum.

== Areas ==
=== Main lobby ===
The main lobby of EnterTRAINment Junction was themed to a typical 1930s railroad town. The lobby consisted of several party rooms, a cafe', gift shop, and offices - all of which had a façade that created the look and feel of a classic town.

=== Train Journey ===
The Train Journey was the main attraction at EnterTRAINment Junction. This 25,000 square foot (2,300 m^{2}) train display was billed as the world's largest indoor train display. Over 60,000 man hours were put into this massive display that featured intricate models and over 90 G-scale model trains. Each G-scale train engine was roughly a 1/24 scale of a real train engine and the nearly 1,200 box cars were approximately the size of a loaf of bread. Interactive buttons throughout the path allowed viewers to control lights, sounds, and moving model pieces. The entire display was separated into three sections displaying the history of rail transport in the United States: the Early Era (1860s through the 1900s), the Middle Era (1940s through the 1950s), and the Modern Era (1970s to the present time).

==== Early Era (1860s through 1900s) ====
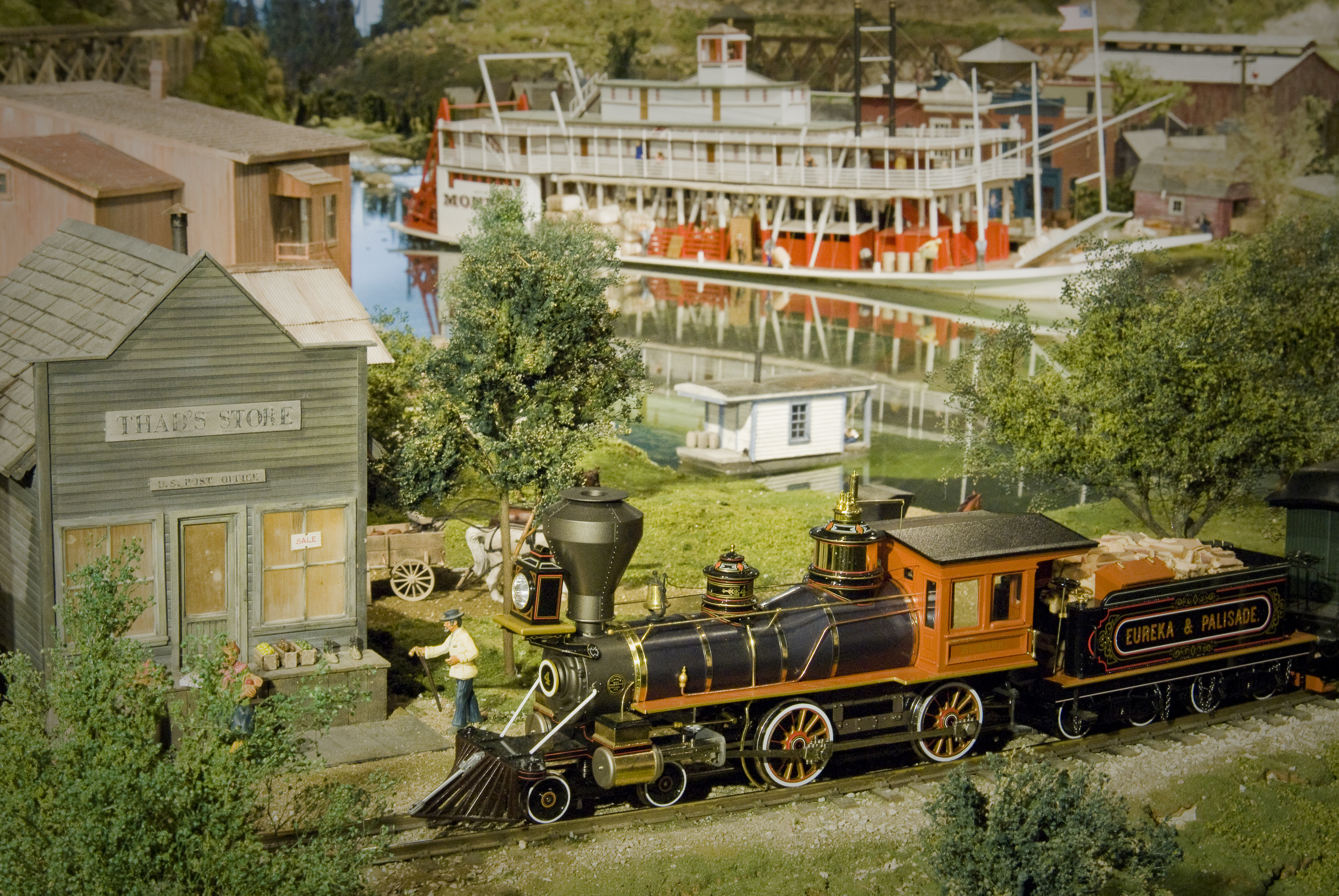
A train travels through a late 1800s railroading neighborhood in the Early Era section of EnterTRAINment Junction.

The first section of the Train Journey explored the Early Era of American Railroading. This section featured several trains that were typical to the era.

The trains traverse a mountainous region that represented the lawless labor force that was responsible for the construction of America's first railroad. The section featured several early railroad towns including a 6 foot (1.8 m) paddle boat and an 11 foot (3.4 m) tall pouring waterfall. The trains passed through tunnels in a rolling hillside, passing buildings and homes that would be found during that time period.

==== Middle Era (1940s through 1950s) ====
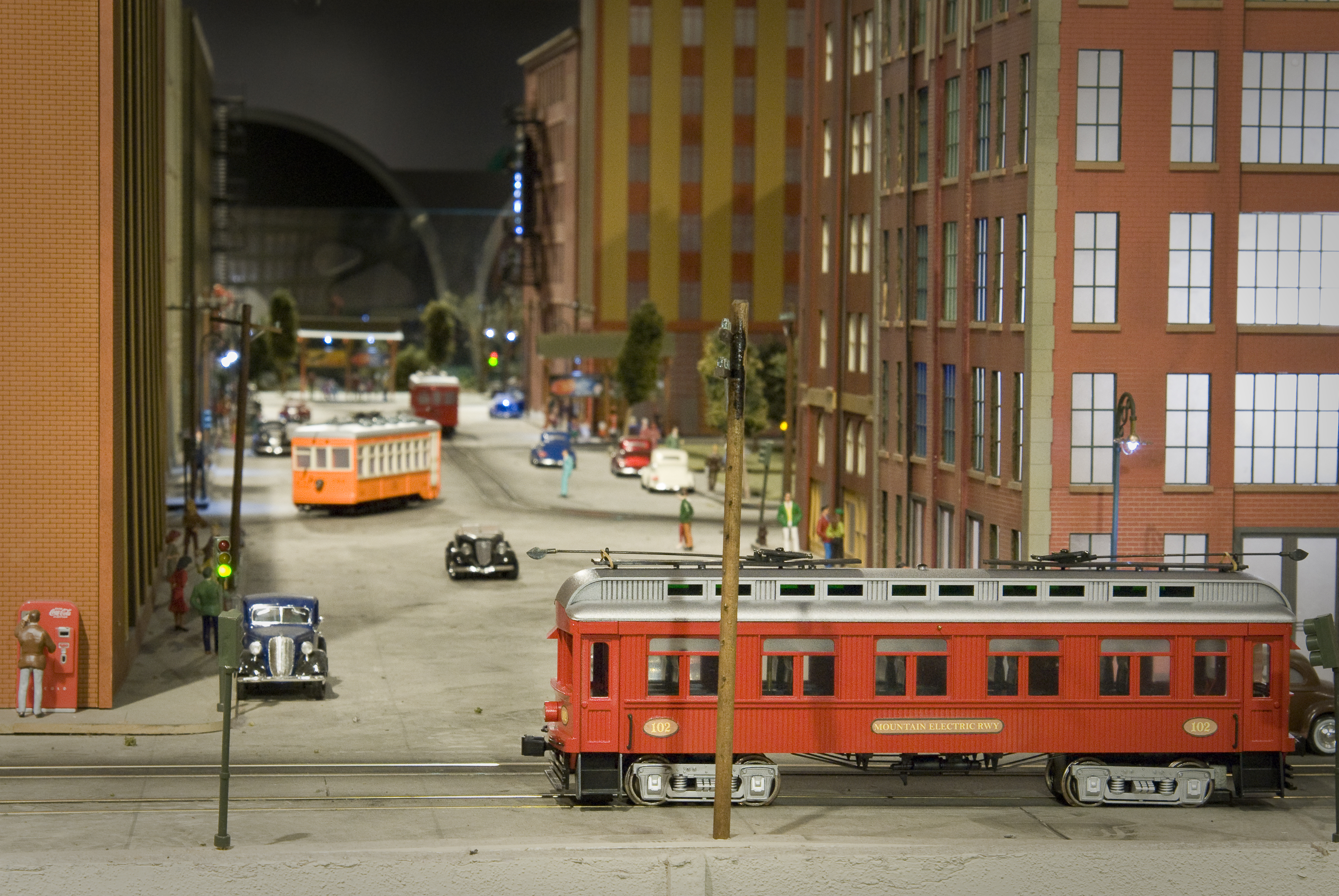
An electric street car travels the streets of a 1950s town in the Middle Era section of EnterTRAINment Junction.

The Middle Era section of the Train Journey displayed how railroading progressed throughout the middle of the 20th century. This area displayed a 1950s American town that would have benefited from the newer technologies in railroading. In addition to the freight and passenger trains reflecting the technology of the time, the town also featured moving street cars and interurbans.

==== Modern Era (1970s to the present) ====
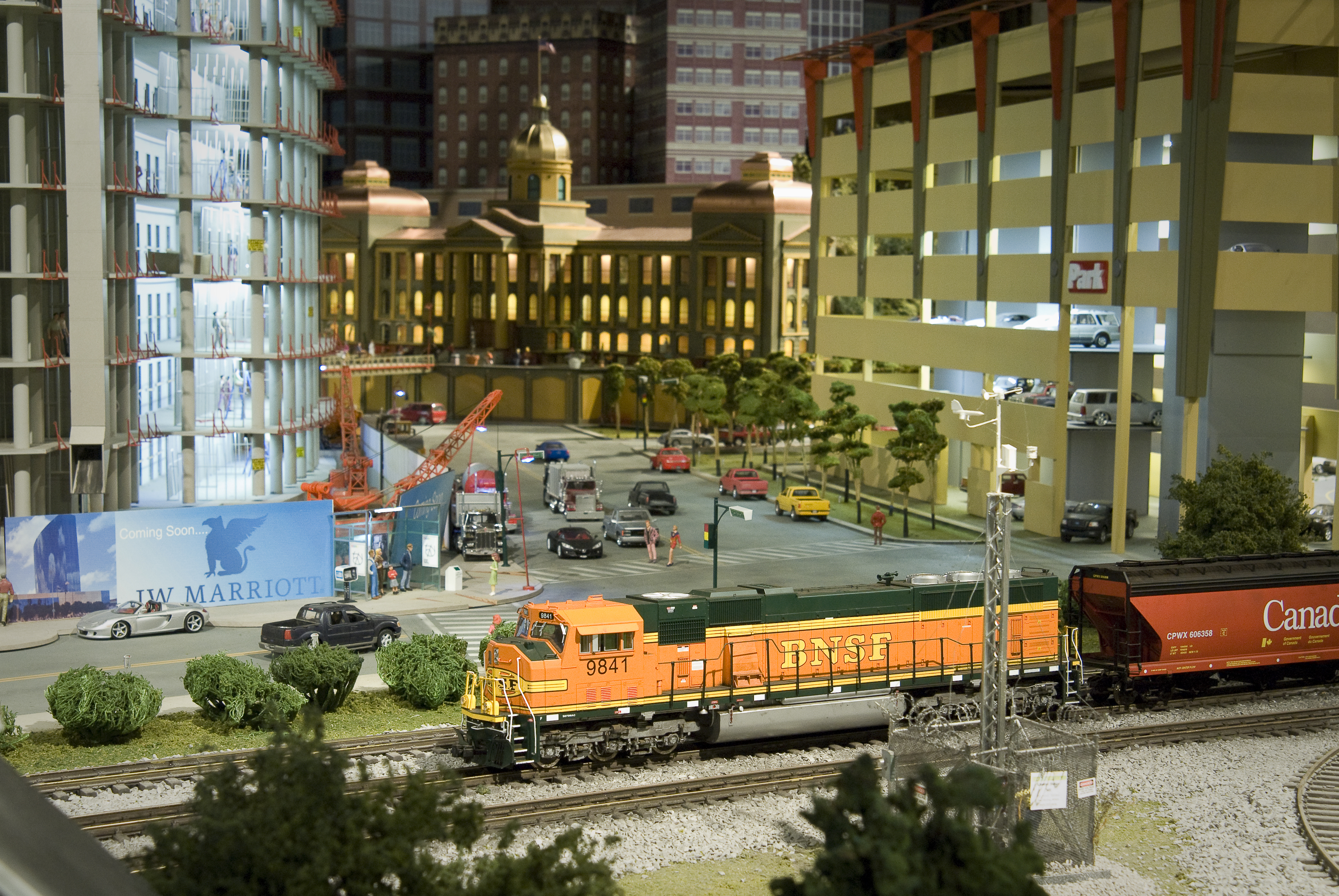
A freight train travels through a busy city in the Modern Era section of EnterTRAINment Junction.

The Modern Era section of the Train Journey displayed railroading as it is today. This section featured skyscrapers that were representative of such companies as Boeing, 3M, as well as Seattle's Space Needle. The trains looked like the large diesel machines you would find today. Much of the emphasis on rail traffic was converted from passenger transit to cargo transit and that was reflected in the area. Interactive models included a railway turntable, a crane for unloading cargo from the trains, and a hot air balloon.

=== Coney Island ===
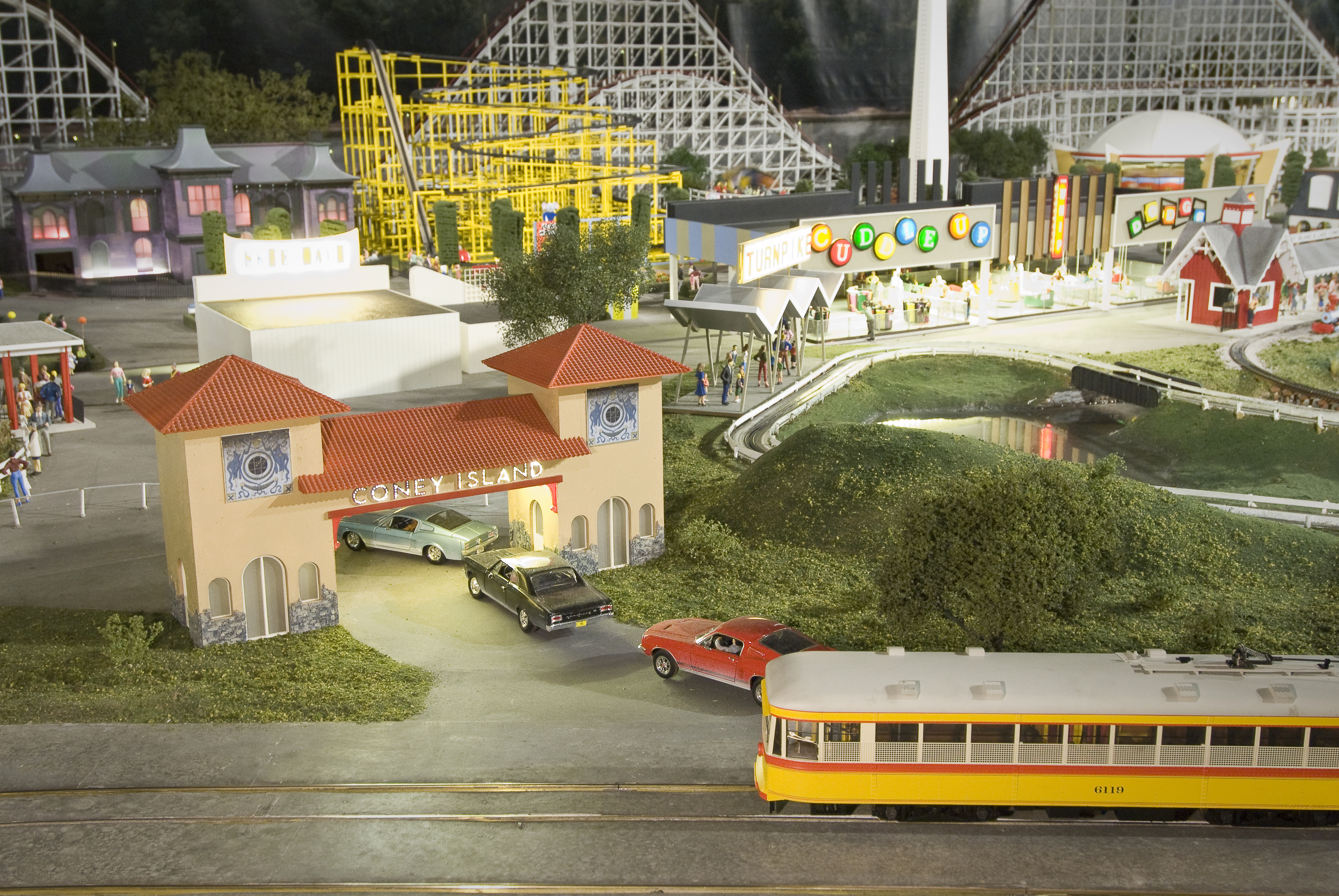
Coney Island Display at EnterTRAINment Junction

EnterTRAINment Junction featured a scale model of the historic Coney Island (Cincinnati, Ohio). This display was a recreation of Coney Island as it was seen in the late 1960s. This included a working model of the famous Shooting Star roller coaster, a 4 foot (1.2 m) tall Ferris Wheel, and several other rides and attractions that would have been found at Coney Island at the time. Due to space limitations some creative license was used in the layout of the model, however all of the models in the display were accurate to the period.

=== Great Train Expo Center ===
The Great Train Expo Center was a large multi-purpose facility within EnterTRAINment Junction. During the months of January and March through August, several additional train displays including one donated by the musician Neil Young were on display. A large replica of the Mount Adams Incline could be found in this area as well. During February, the outdoor electric train was brought into the Expo Center for kids to enjoy. The area was also used for special activities for annual activities such as the indoor pumpkin patch for Jack o'Lantern Junction and a special Holiday Trains Expo during Christmas at the Junction. It was also home to the Cincinnati chapter of the National Railroad Historical Society.

In the rear of the expo center, guests could watch volunteers build, repair, and paint the trains and models that will be on display in the Train Journey.

=== Imagination Junction ===
Imagination Junction was a 5,000 square foot (460 m^{2}) play area specifically for young children. This area featured a climbable tube maze, a kids carousel, and other train themed activities. During the warmer months kids could ride an outdoor narrow gauge train with an electric engine that pulled two cars through 1,000 feet (300 m) of track. Additionally there was the Kids' Express, an outdoor hand-cranked kids train that traversed 400 feet (120 m) of track. Both the electric train and the Kids' Express were an additional charge.

=== A-Maze-N Funhouse ===
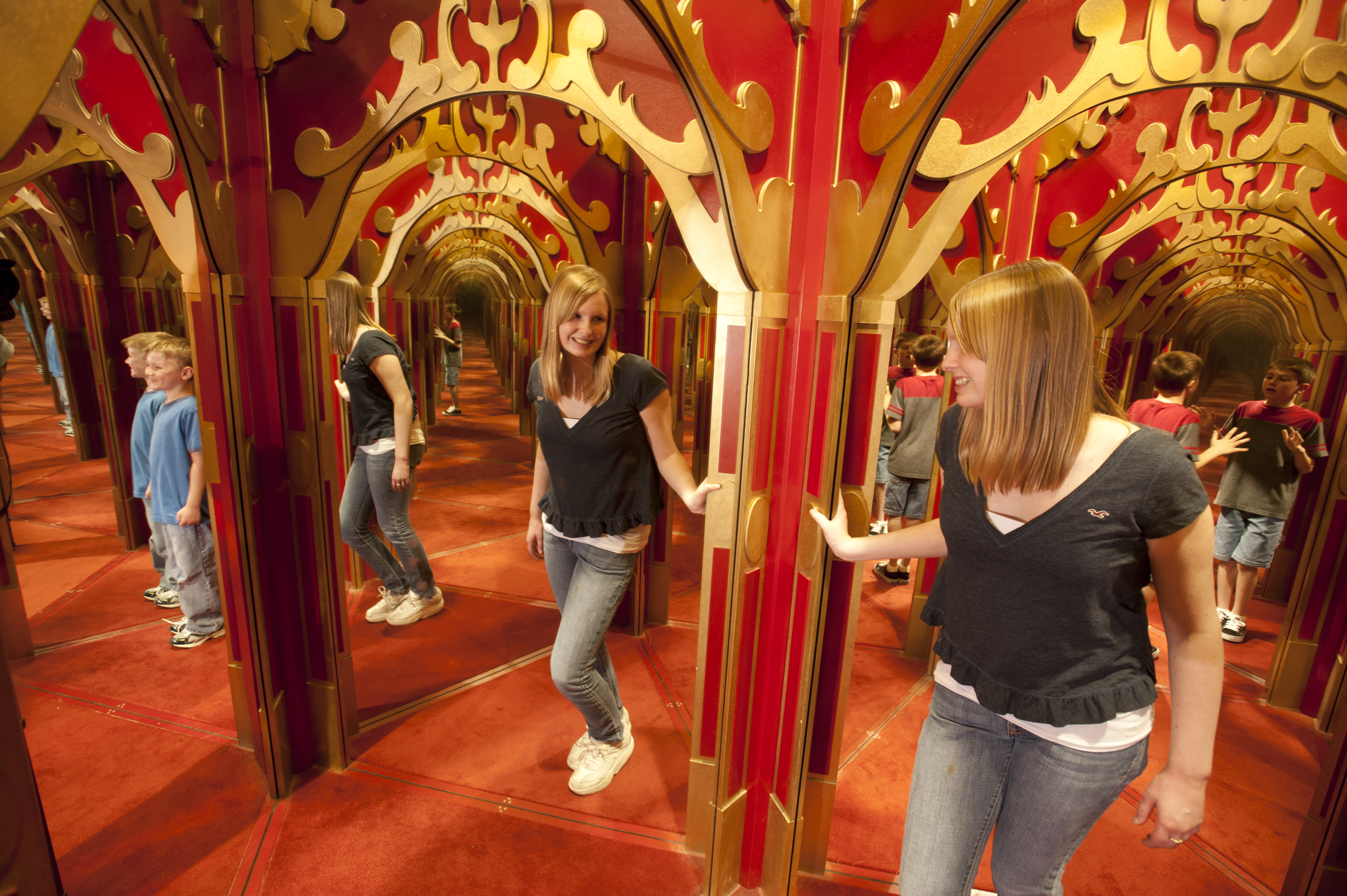
Guests trying to escape the Mirror Maze at EnterTRAINment Junction.

A-Maze-N Funhouse was a section of EnterTRAINment Junction that features five family-friendly mazes with different optical and physical illusions. The main midway was themed to an old-time circus. Within it were five different "tents" that all housed a separate maze.

The first maze was the Mirror Maze, a large house of mirrors. Kids could enter and experience dead ends, optical illusions, and disorientation from being surrounded by hundreds of mirrors.

The second maze was called the Clown College and featured several illusions such as bent mirrors, objects that seemed to defy gravity, and an Ames Room.

The third maze was called Curtain Chaos. Hanging curtains surrounded guests as they try to figured out which way progressed them to the next room, and which way simply ended at a wall.

Outer Limits: Journey Through the Black Hole was a space themed maze. While featuring things such as glowing stars, light effects, and a vortex tunnel, it also had interesting facts and educational pieces about outer space.

The newest maze opened in 2012 and was called Crazy Caper. The story of the maze was that you are on a mission to get the Ring Master's key, which was hidden somewhere in the tent. Along the way you encountered several "booby traps," crazy alarms, and optical illusions such as a Pepper's Ghost effect.

=== It's a Marbleous Life ===
In the summer of 2019, EnterTRAINment Junction opened the world's largest marble (toy) display, which was the second largest marble museum in the world. This was done in conjunction with husband and wife marble enthusiasts Larry and Cathy Svacina. Marbles in this display dated back to the 1800s and included games, collectables, memorabilia, and fun facts about marbles and their multi-generational history.

== Annual events ==
=== Jack o'Lantern Junction ===
Jack o'Lantern Junction was an annual family friendly Halloween Celebration at EnterTRAINment Junction. Families were invited to walk through a trick or treat maze that featured family friendly ghosts, skeletons, and more. The outdoor train rides were open with a special Halloween theme.

=== Christmas at the Junction ===
Christmas at the Junction was a Holiday themed attraction at EnterTRAINment Junction that ran during the Christmas Season. A special attraction was added to the Fun House area of the property that was themed to the North Pole. Families were invited to walk through this attraction on their way to meet Santa Claus. Along the way they encountered animated penguins, reindeer, elves, and even falling snow. The Great Train Expo Center was opened to the public for free during this time of year and featured several miniature train displays on snow covered mountainsides.

=== Christmas in July ===
Christmas in July was an annual celebration around the 25th of each July in which the Christmas activities from Christmas at the Junction opened for the whole month.

=== Everything Thomas ===
Everything Thomas was an annual event that featured PBS's Thomas the Tank Engine. Kids were invited to look for small Thomas toys throughout the Train Journey section of EnterTRAINment Junction. Additionally, Thomas themed attractions were added to the Imagination Junction section of the complex. Special Thomas crafts were also added to the A-Maze-N Funhouse.

== Escape the Room Challenge ==
In the Spring of 2015, EnterTRAINment Junction announced the opening of its sister business Escape the Room Challenge. Situated on the same property as their main complex, it occupied a separate building connected by the main parking lot. Operating as a separate facility, it offered four unique escape room experiences as well as a virtual reality escape room. All games lasted one hour. As of 2020, Escape the Room has closed permanently.

=== Esmeralda's Curse ===
Themed to a fortune teller's parlor, guests have one hour to escape before the curse steals your soul. The room has a 4 out of 4 difficulty rating.

=== Escape the Mob ===
The mob has stolen your priceless family heirloom. You must infiltrate their shipping warehouse and escape before the mob arrives. This was considered medium difficulty.

=== Double Agent Dilemma ===
This room is of medium difficulty, with the goal being to expose a double agent and then disarm a bomb planted in the agency.

=== Uncle Ernie's Millions ===
In February 2017, Escape the Room Challenge opened Uncle Ernie's Millions. The story involved your rich uncle passing and you were tasked with finding his will in order to inherit his $50 million.

=== DeComposed VR ===
In April 2019, Escape the Room Challenge opened DeComposed, the first virtual reality escape room experience in the region. DeComposed consisted of up to four players who could work together and interact virtually through the in-game experience.

== See also ==
- Miniatur Wunderland
- Holiday Junction
