= F. W. Woolworth Building (Lexington, Kentucky) =

- U.S. National Register of Historic Places
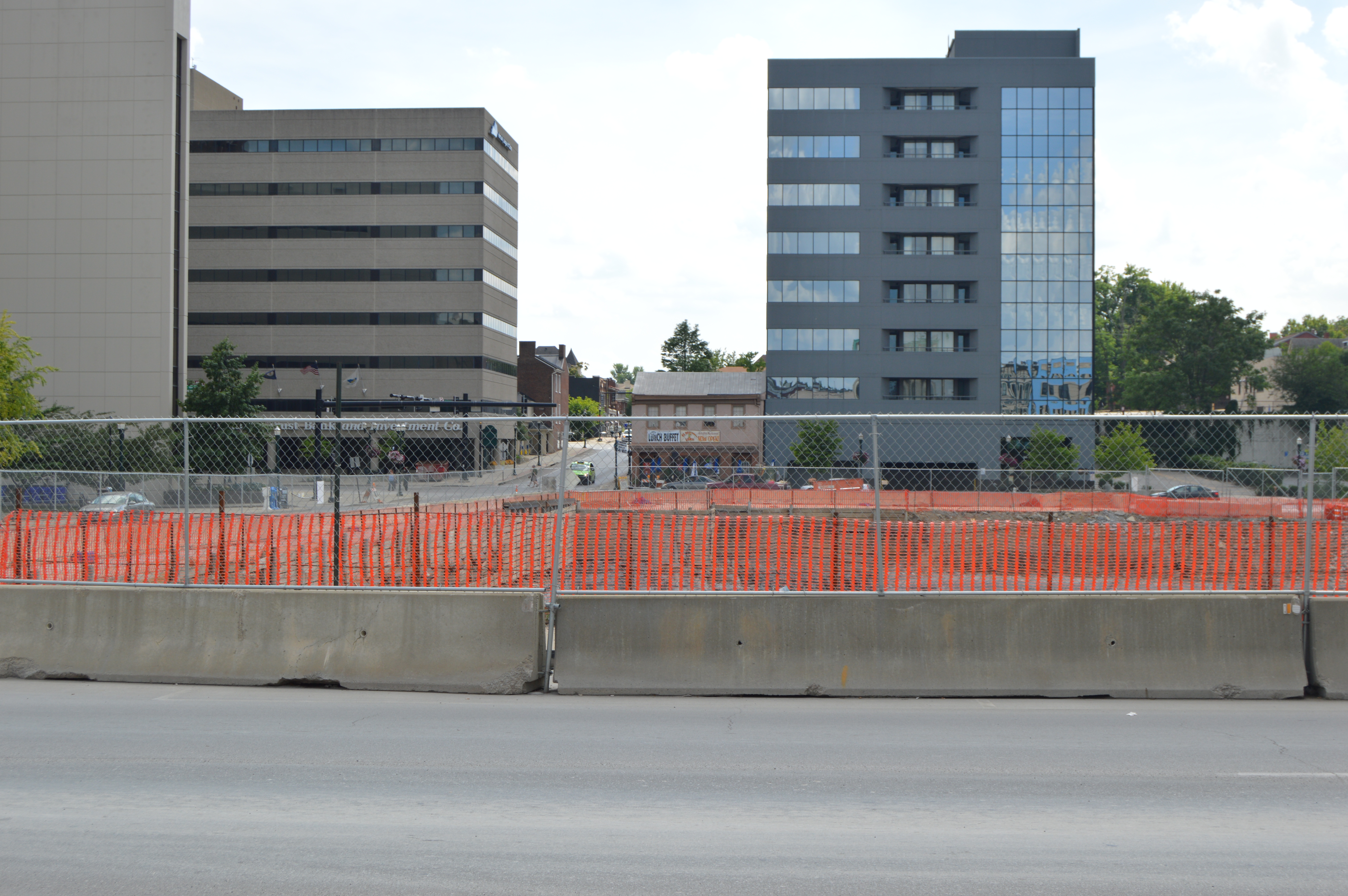
- Former site of the building.

- Location within Kentucky Location within the United States
- Location: 106 Main St., Lexington, Kentucky
- Coordinates: 38.0464°N 84.4975°W
- Built: 1946
- Architect: Frederick W. Garber
- Architectural style: Art Deco
- NRHP reference No.: 02000924
- Added to NRHP: 2002-09-06

The Woolworth, F.W., Building was a historic department store building located in Lexington, Kentucky, that served as a retail location for the F. W. Woolworth Company from 1946 to 1990. It was designed by Frederick W. Garber.

The store was the site of protests during the Civil Rights Movement against segregation during the 1960s.

After 1990, the city government favored creating a business incubator on the site. However, the building was demolished in 2004 and turned into a parking lot. As of 2022, the location is the City Center development which includes a Marriot hotel, restaurants and retail.

== See also ==
- Greensboro sit-ins
- List of Woolworth buildings
- Laurel Homes, also by architect Frederick W. Garber
- National Register of Historic Places listings in Fayette County, Kentucky
