= Laurel Homes Historic District =

Historic district in Ohio, United States

- U.S. National Register of Historic Places
- U.S. Historic district
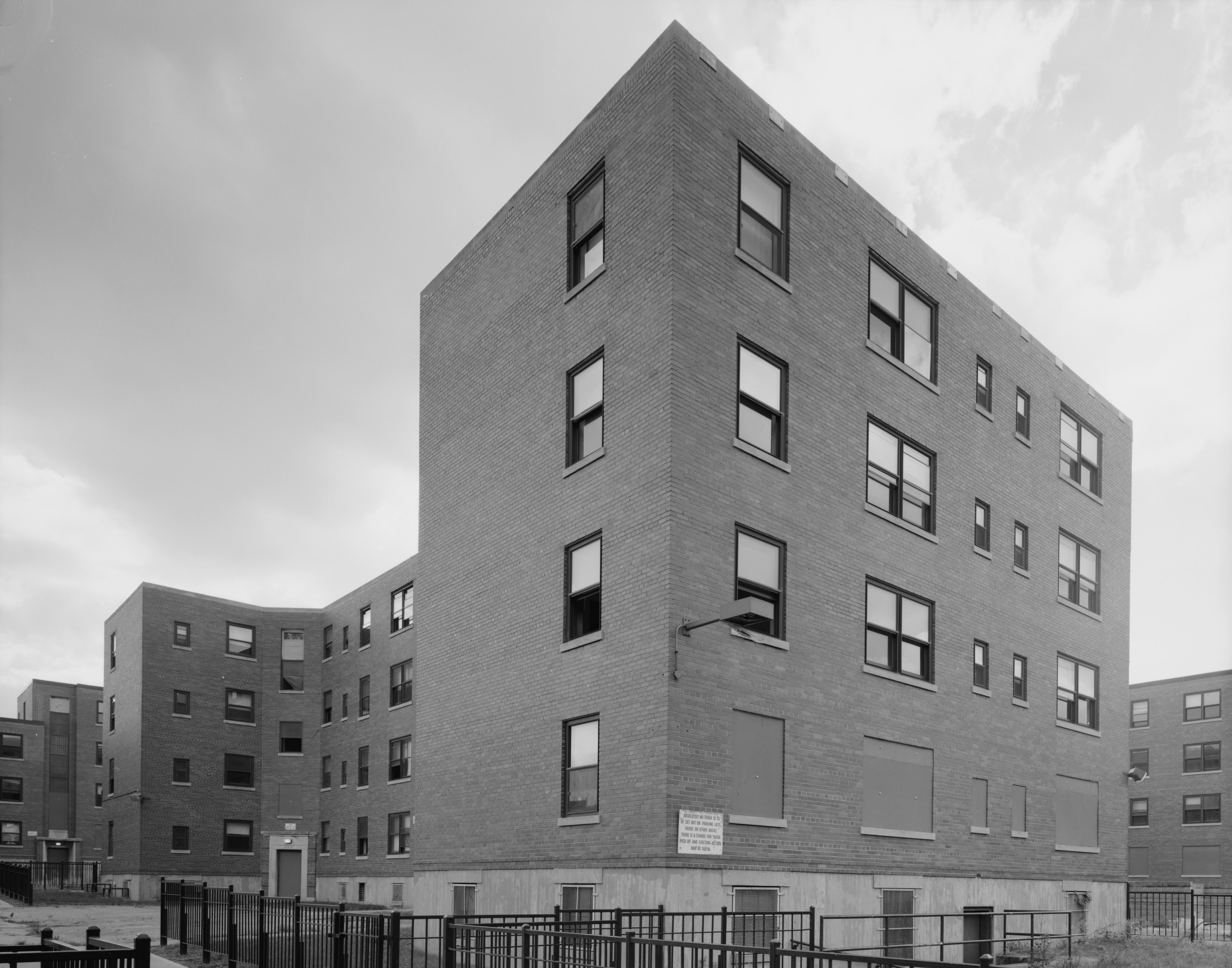
- One of the buildings at Laurel Homes

- Location within Ohio Location within the United States
- Location: Roughly bounded by Liberty and John Sts., Ezzard Charles Dr., and Linn St., Cincinnati, Ohio
- Coordinates: 39°6′41″N 84°31′27″W
- Area: 34 acres (14 ha)
- Built: 1933
- Architect: Frederick W. Garber, et al.
- NRHP reference No.: 87000690
- Added to NRHP: May 19, 1987

Laurel Homes Historic District is a registered historic district in Cincinnati, Ohio, listed in the National Register of Historic Places on May 19, 1987. It contained 29 contributing buildings.

All but three of the historic low-income public housing projects was razed between 2000–02 to make way for new condominiums.

== History ==
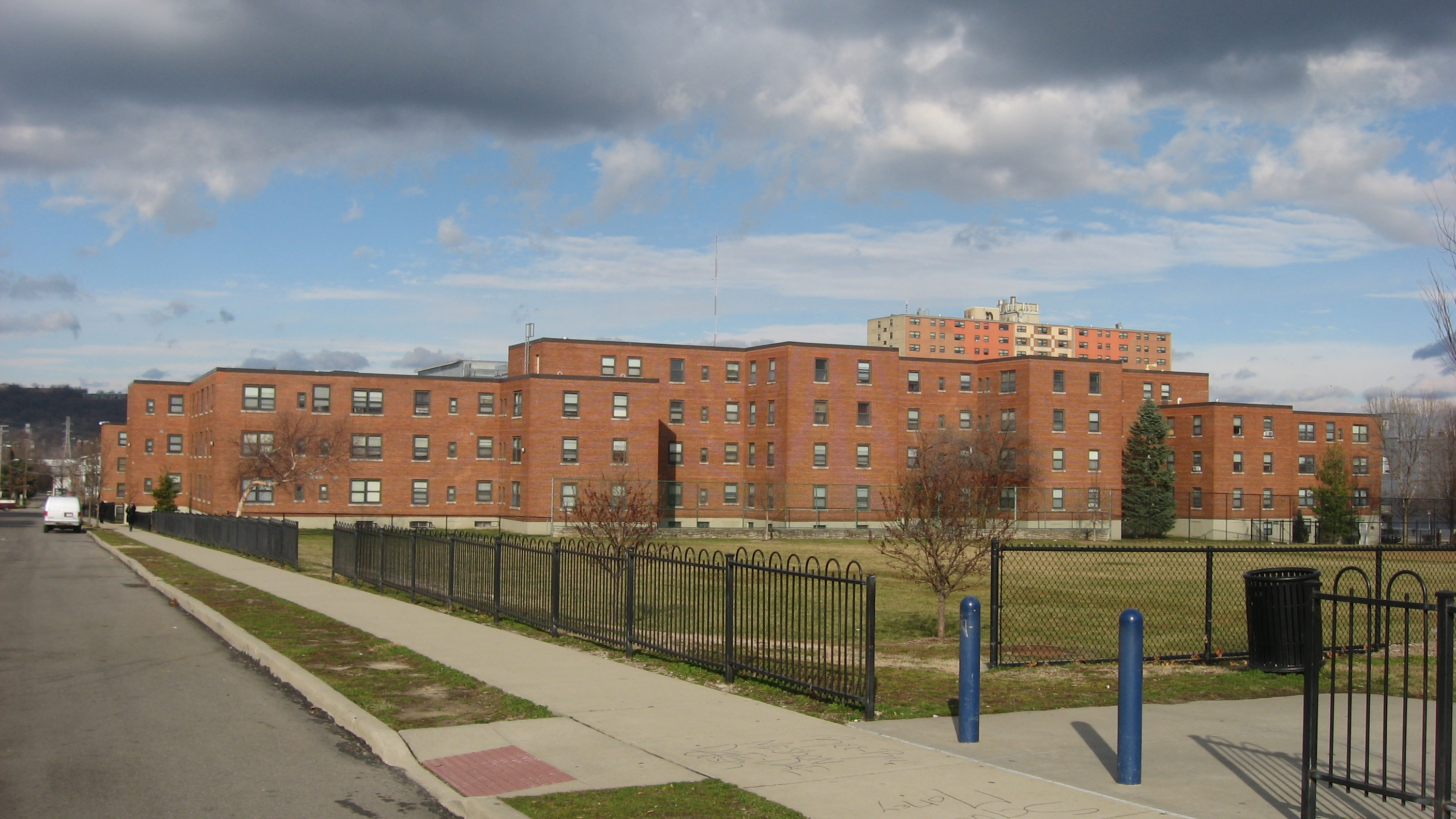
One of the remaining buildings

Laurel Homes was established in 1938 with 1303 units of low income housing. An adjacent property of 1015 units, Lincoln Court, opened in 1942 to black families only. Apartments at Laurel Homes were leased to both white and to lesser degree, black, families, making it nominally one of the first integrated housing projects in the United States.

Laurel Homes was the second largest Public Works Administration public housing project in the country.

== See also ==
- Woolworth Building in Lexington, Kentucky by the same architect, Frederick W. Garber.
- National Register of Historic Places listings in Cincinnati, Ohio
