= Duke Energy Building =

Historic 18-story structure in Cincinnati, Ohio

Coordinates: 39°06′00″N 84°30′35″W

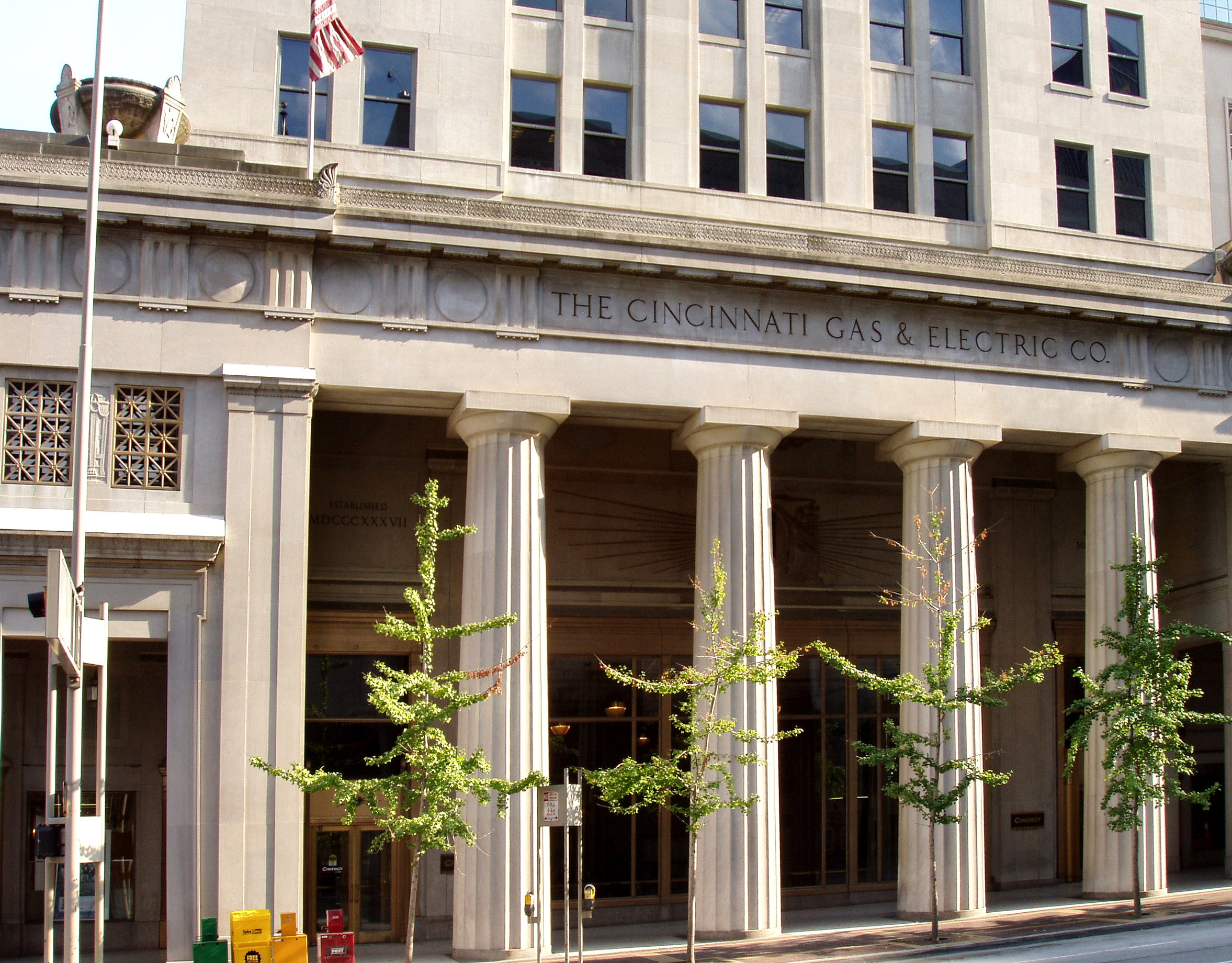
- The Fourth Street entrance
- Interactive map of the Duke Energy Building area

General information
- Location: Cincinnati, Ohio, United States
- Completed: 1929

Height
- Height: 269.03 feet (82.00 m)

Technical details
- Floor count: 18

Design and construction
- Architects: Garber & Woodward and John Russell Pope
- Known for: Location of Cincinnati's first white child birth

The Duke Energy Building (formerly the Cincinnati Gas & Electric Company Building) is a historic, 18-story, 269-foot-tall (82 m) structure in Cincinnati, Ohio. It was designed by Cincinnati architectural firm Garber & Woodward and John Russell Pope.

== History ==
The neoclassical tower was completed in 1929 for the Cincinnati Gas & Electric Company and served as the company's headquarters until its merger with Duke Energy in 2006. From 1946 to 2011, CG&E sponsored an annual holiday model train display in the building's first-floor lobby.

== See also ==
- Duke Energy Convention Center
