= Dixie Terminal =

American building complex in Ohio

Coordinates: 39.099937°N 84.511334°W

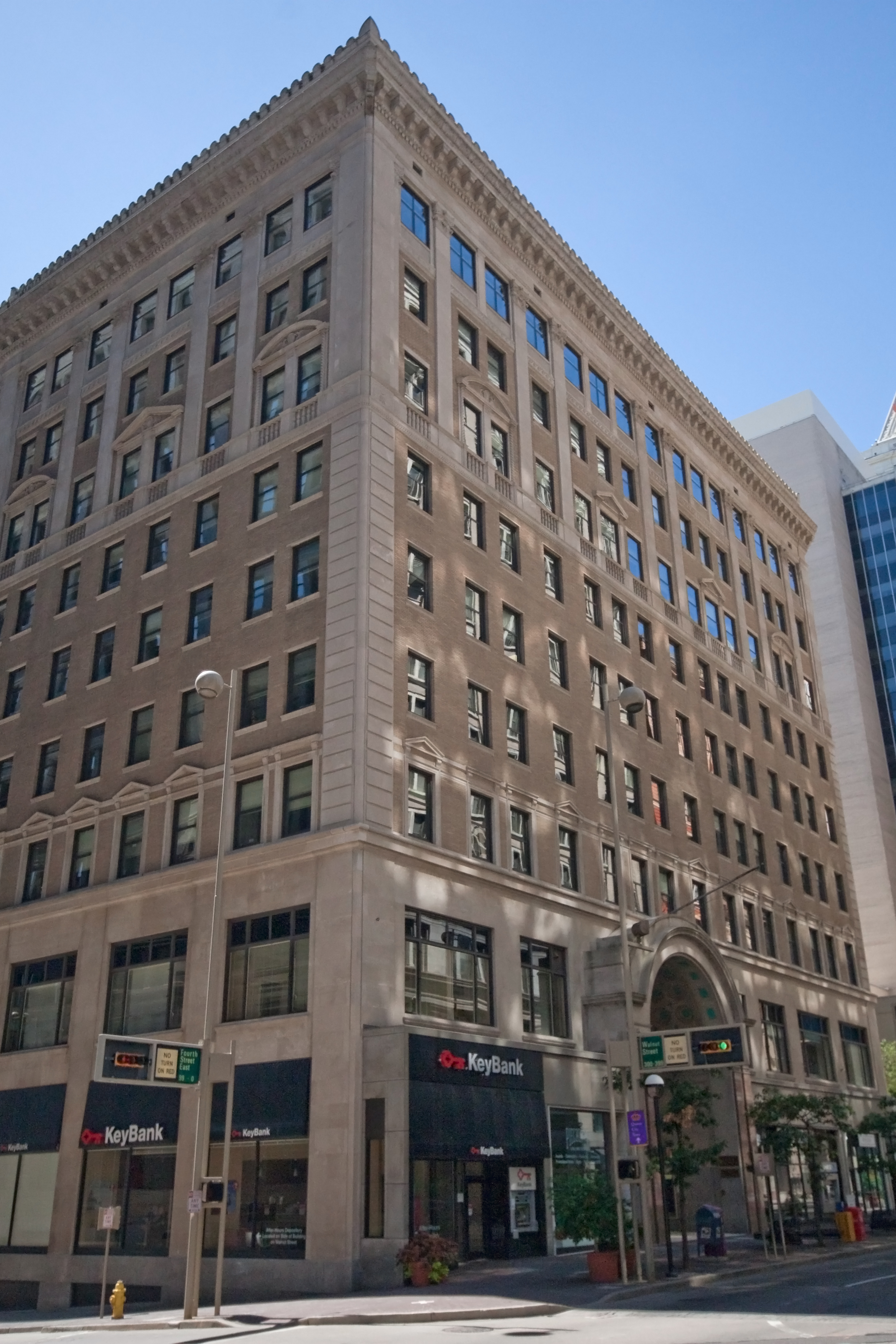
Dixie Terminal North Building - Fourth and Walnut Streets

The Dixie Terminal is a set of buildings in Cincinnati, Ohio, that were completed in 1921 and served as a streetcar terminal, stock exchange, and office building in the city's downtown business district. They were designed by Cincinnati architect Frederick W. Garber's Garber & Woodward firm. The main building includes an Adamesque barrel-vaulted concourse and Rookwood Architectural Faience entry arch. The Rookwood tiles were manufactured by the local Rookwood Pottery Company.

At Fourth and Walnut Streets, the terminal was constructed of reinforced concrete and finished in gray brick, Bedford limestone, and granite. It includes two structures: the four-story south building extending to Third Street, where streetcars entered and left, and the "handsome" 10-story north building, housing railroad ticket agencies, the Cincinnati Stock Exchange, administrative offices of the Cincinnati Street Railway Company, commercial offices, and shops.

A long and elaborate arcade runs through from main entrance through the building, lined by shops. The building included marble floors, Bottincino marble wainscot, metal trimmings, and "costly brightly decorated ceilings, with fanciful medallions showing little children riding on the backs of various animals".

The terminal was used for bus service after streetcar service ceased in the 1950s. Buses arriving from Northern Kentucky crossed the Roebling Suspension Bridge and took ramps from the bridge into the terminal. In 1998 the ramps were removed, and the bus service ceased using the terminal. The Cincinnati Stock Exchange closed its physical trading floor in 1976 after becoming an all-electronic stock trading exchange but remained in the building until relocating to Chicago in 1995 as the National Stock Exchange.

A scene in the 1988 film Rain Man was shot at Dixie Terminal.

== Ornament and decoration ==
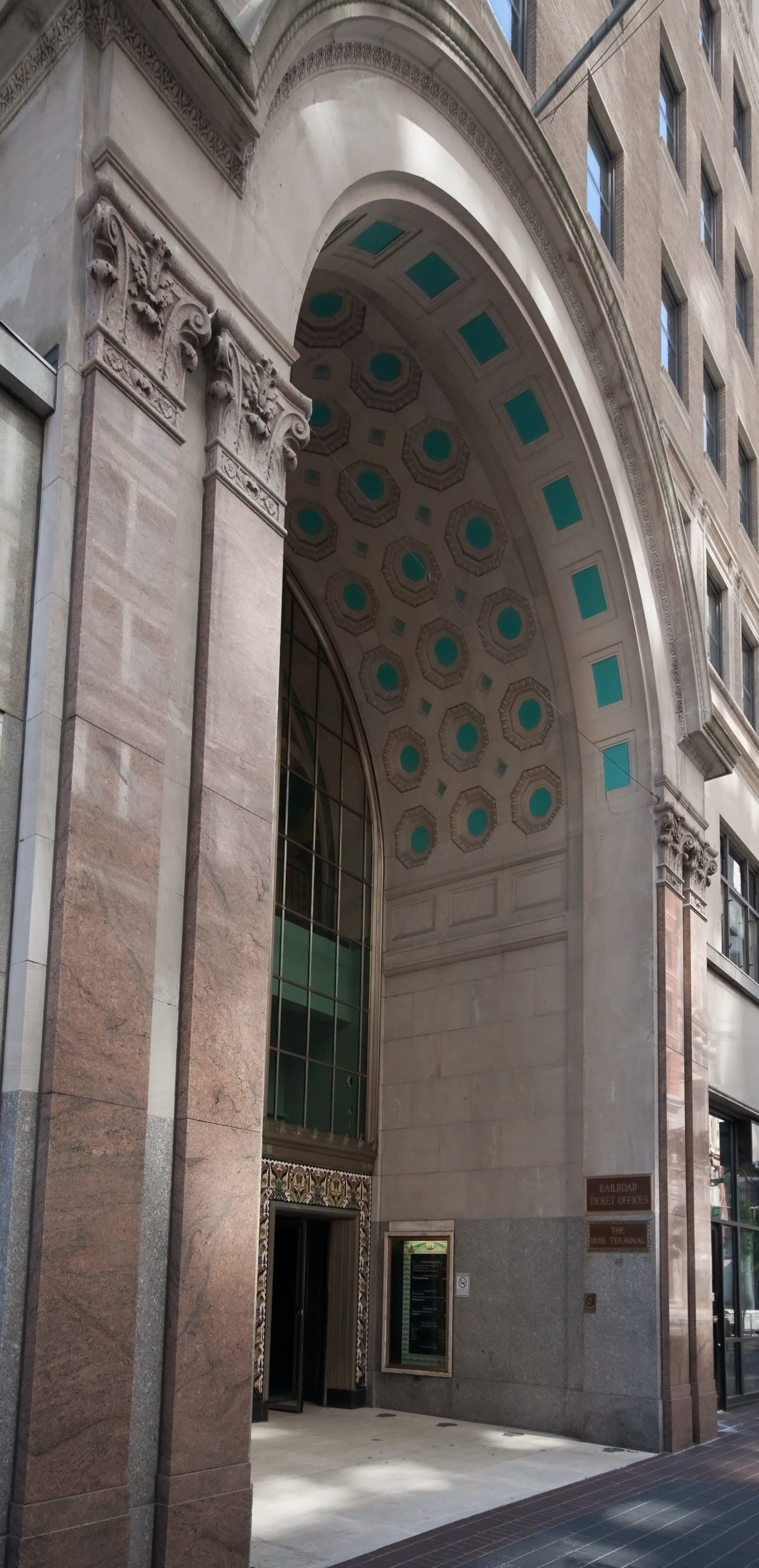
Dixie Terminal Entrance

Joseph Francis Beller is believed responsible for the original gold-leafing and the "frolicking" cherubs in the building.

== See also ==
- List of stock exchanges in the Americas
