= Cincinnati History Museum =

Museum in Cincinnati, Ohio, U.S.

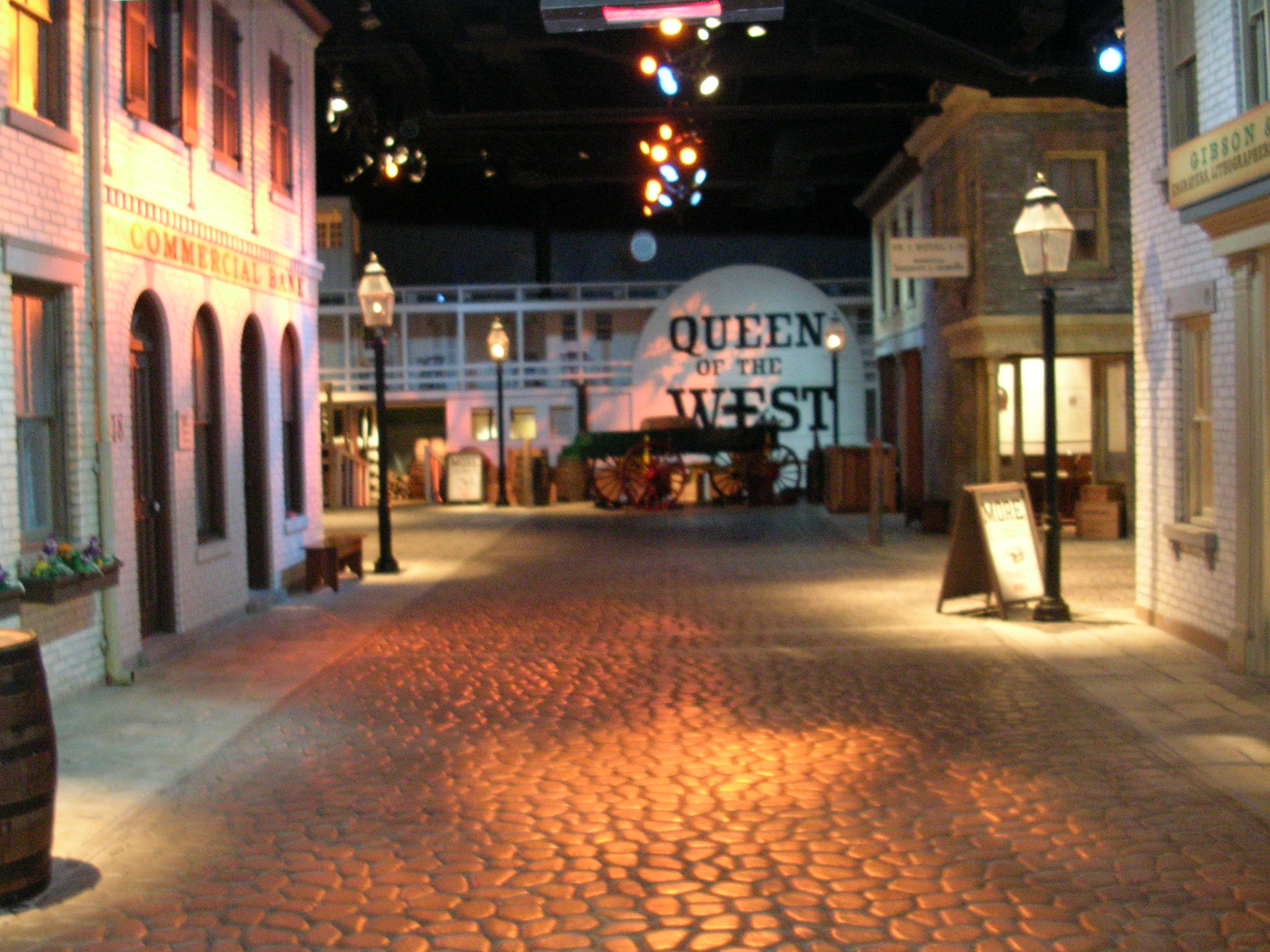
- The Public Landing at the Cincinnati History Museum in Cincinnati Ohio.
- Established: 1990
- Location: Cincinnati, Ohio
- Coordinates: 39°06′37″N 84°32′15″W
- Type: Urban history
- Website: www.cincymuseum.org/historymuseum/

The Cincinnati History Museum is an urban history museum in Cincinnati, Ohio, United States. It opened in 1990 at the Cincinnati Museum Center at Union Terminal.

The museum features the recreated Cincinnati Public Landing. Explore a recreation of the bustling Public Landing from the late 1850s and climb aboard the Queen of the West, a replica side-wheel steamboat. Take an aerial view of Cincinnati from the early 1900s through 1940s in Cincinnati in Motion, a 1/64-scale replica of the city complete with the nation’s largest S-scale train model. Cincinnati In Motion is a scale model representation of Downtown Cincinnati in the 1940s featuring working streetcars.

== Galleries ==
The Cincinnati History Museum included 6 main galleries until its temporary closure in 2016:

- Cincinnati In Motion
- Cincinnati Goes to War
- Early Settlement
- Flatboat Gallery
- Public Landing
- Machine Tools

As of 2024, its exhibits now include:

- Cincinnati in Motion
- Made in Cincinnati
- Shaping our City
- You are Here
- Public Landing
- Indigenous People's Gallery (Coming 2026)
