= Cincinnati Museum Center =

Museum center in Cincinnati, Ohio, US

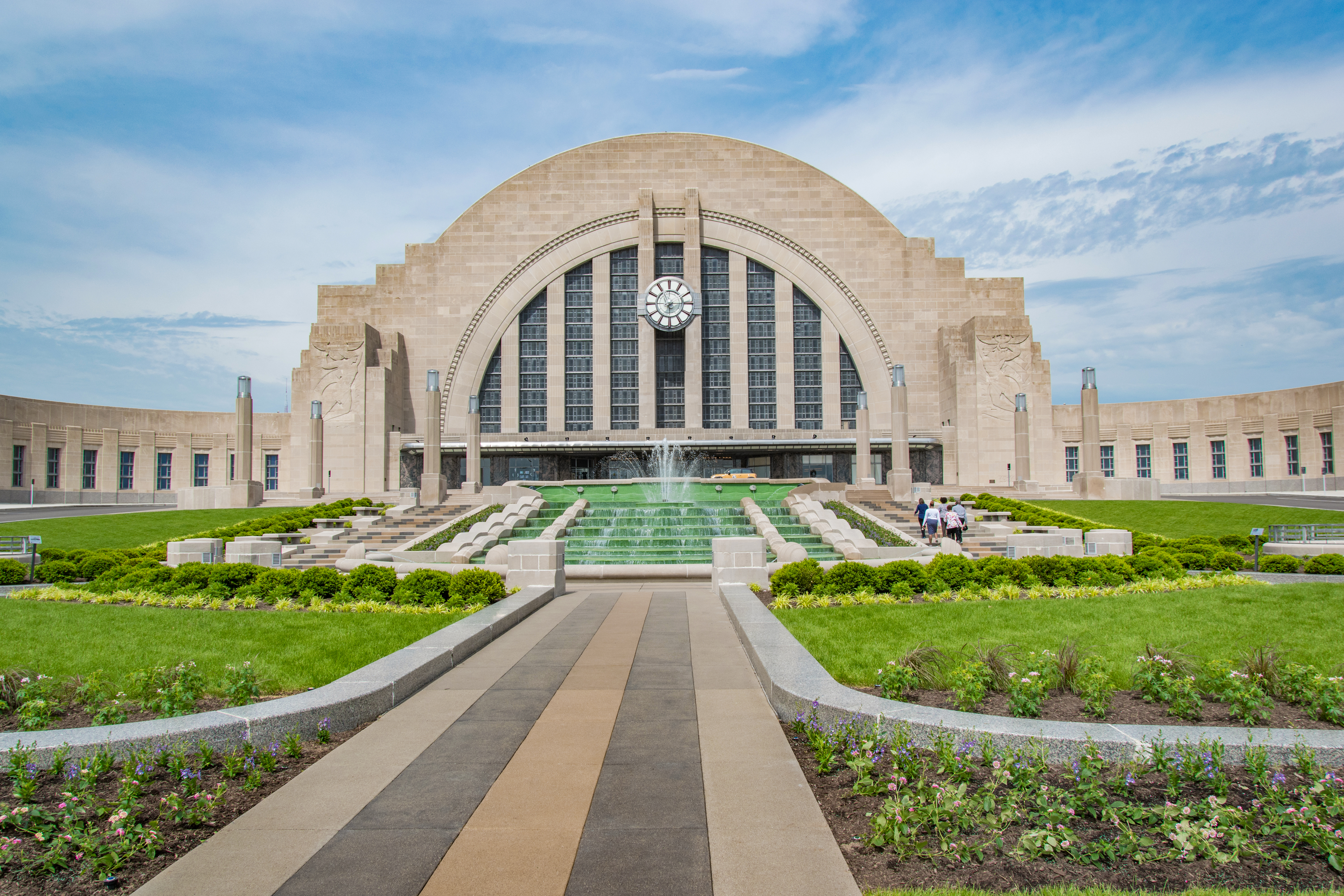
- Main (east) facade
- Interactive fullscreen map
- Established: January 1995
- Location: 1301 Western Avenue; Cincinnati, OH
- Coordinates: 39°06′36″N 84°32′16″W
- Type: General interest
- Accreditation: American Alliance of Museums
- Collection size: 40,000 historical objects, 1,500 works of fine art
- Visitors: 1.8 million (2019)
- Key people: Elizabeth Pierce (President and CEO), Jeffery P. Hopkins (Chairman)
- Architect: Fellheimer & Wagner
- Public transit access: SORTA Route 49
- Parking: On site, variable fee
- Website: www.cincymuseum.org

The Cincinnati Museum Center is a museum complex operating out of the Cincinnati Union Terminal in the Queensgate neighborhood of Cincinnati, Ohio. It houses museums, theater, a library, and a symphonic pipe organ, as well as special traveling exhibitions.

== Museums ==
The museum provides a home to five organizations:

- Cincinnati History Museum
- Museum of Natural History & Science
- Robert D. Lindner Family Omnimax Theater
- Cincinnati History Library and Archives
- Duke Energy Children's Museum
- Nancy & David Wolf Holocaust and Humanity Center

=== Museum of Natural History & Science ===
The Museum of Natural History & Science includes a space called Dinosaur Hall, featuring skeletons and fossils, including skeletons in the Galeamopus, Daspletosaurus, and Torvosaurus genera. The Torvosaurus skeleton, installed in 2018, is the most complete skeleton of the genus, at 55 percent complete, and the only Torvosaurus skeleton publicly exhibited.

The natural history museum also includes a reproduction of a limestone cave. The exhibit, titled "The Cave", was first installed as "The Cavern" in the museum's Gilbert Avenue location in 1967, ten years after the location opened. It was reinstalled in Union Terminal around 1994. It was designed to resemble Mammoth Cave National Park, the longest cave system in the world, in nearby Kentucky. Workers with extensive cave knowledge sculpted the cave from gunite. The exhibit has two levels and spans 500 feet. It includes an underground stream and vertical cavities (dome pits), one of which is 40 feet high.

=== Exhibits ===
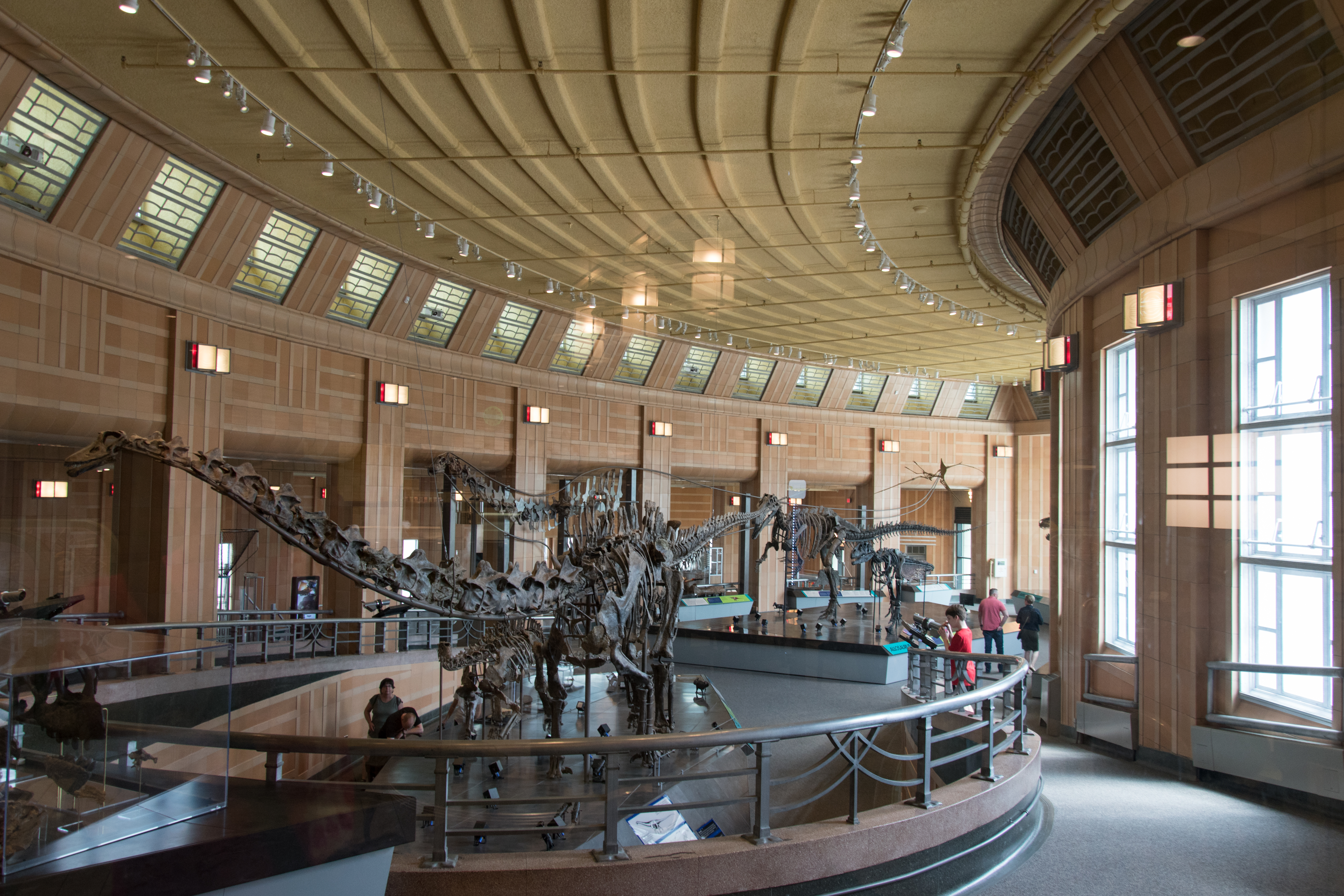
Dinosaur Hall

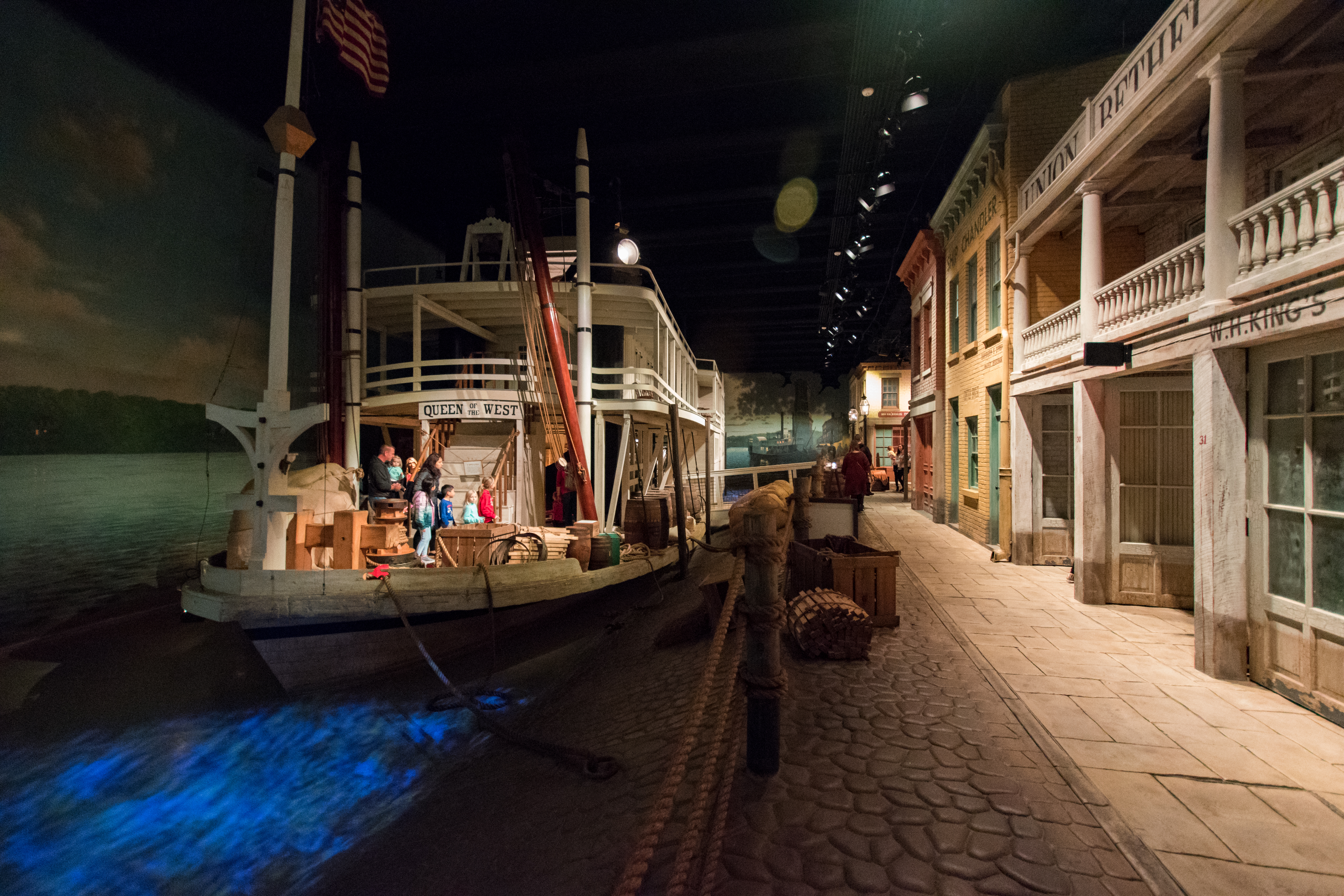
Public Landing recreation

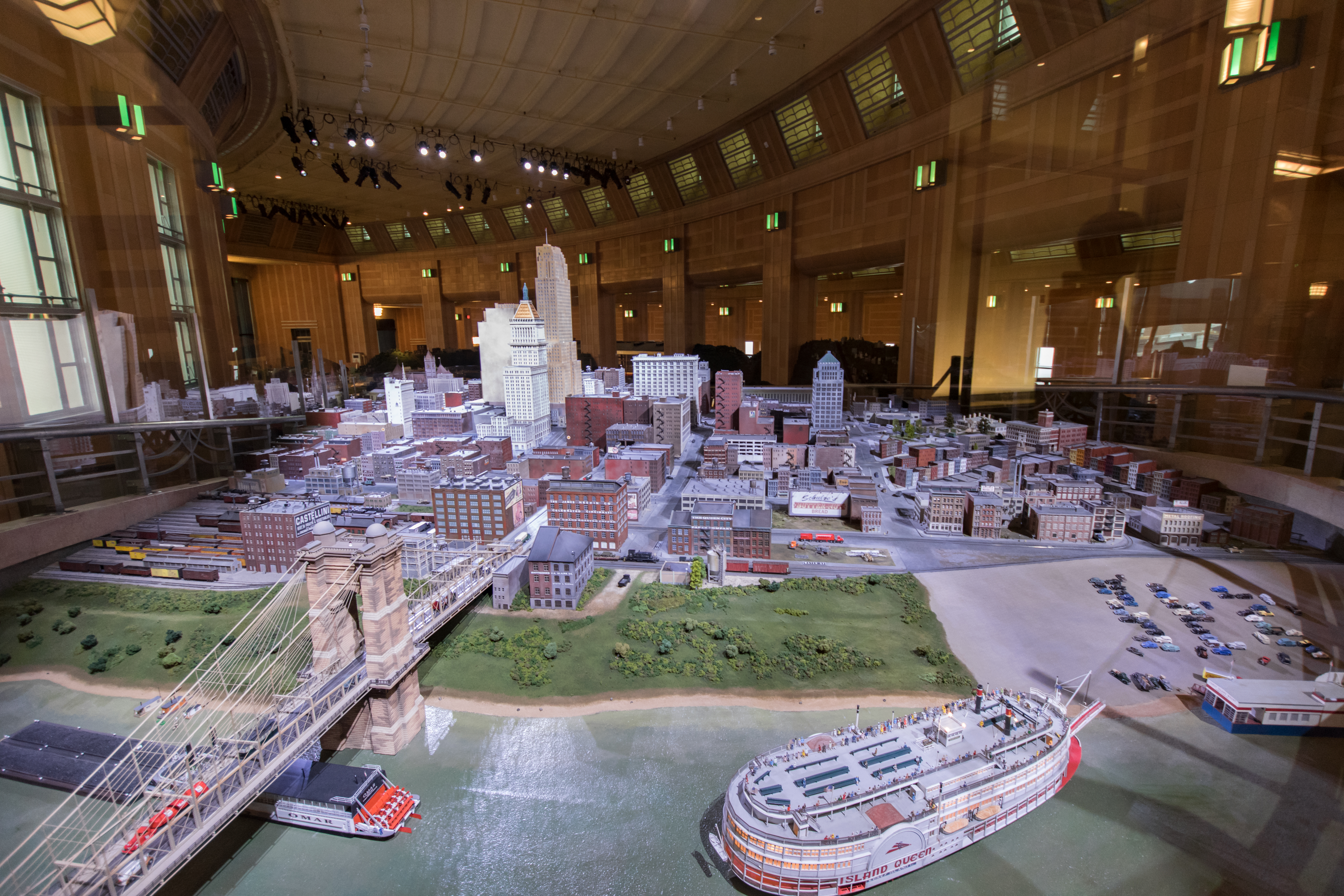
Cincinnati in Motion exhibit

Holiday Junction is an annual rail-themed event at the museum center.

== History ==
Beginning in the early 1980s, the Cincinnati Historical Society and Cincinnati Museum of Natural History were searching for larger spaces. Both had their origins in the early-mid 1800s, and the historical society was interested in creating a museum. The most favorable options in their studies were to join in occupying space in Union Terminal. In May 1986, the voters of the surrounding county approved $33 million in funding to transform the building into museum space. The state of Ohio provided $8 million, the city provided $3 million, while about 3,000 individuals, corporations, and foundations also donated to the effort. Talk show host and former Cincinnati mayor Jerry Springer was one of the major proponents of saving the building and transforming it into a museum. The terminal's 200,000 square feet of underground space, then used as parking space, as well as its taxi and bus ramps, were renovated into exhibition space. The main concourse was restored, retail space was refurbished, and the theater was restored. The entrance to the train concourse was renovated into the Omnimax theater, and the men's lounge became Amtrak's waiting room and ticket counter.

In 1986, the Union Terminal Association (UTA) was created to facilitate long-term preservation of the terminal. The organization included community members and city and county officials. The UTA leased the building from the city and searched for tenants. The UTA joined the Historical Society and Museum of Natural History in creating the Heritage Center at Union Terminal.

The first exhibit shown in the terminal was U.S.S.R.: Individual, Family, Society in February 1988, in a cultural agreement between US President Ronald Reagan and Soviet leader Mikhail Gorbachev.

The museum as a whole opened on November 10, 1990, though it had its "grand opening day" on November 2, 1991, with the two museum's first permanent exhibits there. The original members of the museum center were the Cincinnati Historical Society Library, Cincinnati History Museum, Cincinnati Museum of Natural History, and the Robert D. Lindner Family Omnimax Theater. The museum center opened with the largest display of robotic dinosaurs, the largest World War II commemorative exhibit, and one of fourteen Omnimax theaters in the United States. Museum center officials were unsure if people would travel to the new museums as predicted, though the center became the fourth-largest attraction in the area, behind the Cincinnati Reds, Kings Island, and the Cincinnati Zoo. The renovations included the installation of the Grand E.M. Skinner Concert Organ. In 1995, the entities officially merged to create the Cincinnati Museum Center, also joined by the Cinergy Children's Museum in October 1998.

In 2004, the county again approved an operating levy for the building's operating costs and capital repairs. In 2009, the museum center began a project to restore the southwest wing of the terminal, including new roofing, masonry repairs, a new HVAC system, and restoration of four dining rooms on the south side of the terminal. In 2009, county residents approved an extension of the 2004 levy for further repairs.

From July 2016 until November 2018, the museum was shut down in order to complete a $228 million renovation throughout the entire building, in addition to restoring numerous rooms original to the building. The renovation was approved by Hamilton County voters through an increased sales tax, bringing $176 million, and was also funded by $5 million in state grants, $7.5 million in donations, and $39 million in federal historic tax credits. It was the first full renovation of the building, after two smaller renovations that made the Land of Oz shopping center and the Cincinnati Museum Center operable. Original plans called for leaving the Duke Energy Children's Museum and the Cincinnati History Museum open, but it was decided to shutter the entire building after water damage proved to be more extensive than previously thought. During the closure, items located in the museum were stored in the Geier Center, the museum's research and storage facility, and in various traveling exhibits across the country.

The building and museum center had their reopening ceremony on November 17, 2018. The terminal expanded its foodservice contract from 2014 for operation of three dining rooms on the main concourse, two on the lower level, a retail shop, and other rotating operations. The main level operation Cup and Pint now serves pizzas, coffee, and draft beer, while Nourish 513 serves sandwiches, salads, and fast food. The Rookwood Tea Room reopened as a Graeter's location. In January 2019, the terminal gained another museum as a tenant, the Nancy & David Wolf Holocaust and Humanity Center, in the former space of the History Library.

In July 2024, the museum announced the purchase of a former Heidelberg Distributing Company facility to use as a new collections storage center. The 200,000 sq ft (19,000 m^{2}) facility was named the Vontz Family Education, Research and Collections Center a year later.

== Events ==
One of the museum center's largest events is its annual 1940s Day, a celebration of the decade, every year on the second weekend in August. The event includes a classic car show, swing dancing, big band music, and a vintage costume contest. The museum center began hosting 1940s-themed celebrations during its 75th anniversary celebration in 2008. It celebrates the 1940s, which was the peak passenger traffic period for Union Terminal, especially during World War II.

The museum center is also host to public speakers, including then-presidential candidate Hillary Clinton speaking alongside 2020 candidate Elizabeth Warren in 2016. Mitt Romney held his first presidential rally there in 2012, while then-candidate Barack Obama held a discussion on healthcare in 2008. Presidential nominee John Kerry gave a speech in 2004. In 2002, sitting president George W. Bush made his case for declaring war with Iraq. Presidential nominee and former vice president Joe Biden gave a speech at the terminal in 2020, amid the COVID-19 pandemic.

Beside speeches, vice president Dan Quayle visited the museum in 1991, and president Dwight D. Eisenhower was greeted by the public, prominent Republicans, and a band in 1952. President Harry S. Truman visited the terminal on five occasions between 1948 and 1952, and Franklin D. Roosevelt visited in 1936.

== Collection ==
The museum center has a collection of materials relating to Union Terminal, including 14 of the architects' drawings of the terminal, the silver trowel used at the cornerstone laying in 1931, the gold key used by Cincinnati mayor Russell Wilson in dedicating the terminal in 1933, the dedication book published by the Cincinnati Chamber of Commerce, a collection of Union Terminal and Western Hills viaduct photographs taken between 1929 and 1933, a collection of construction photographs, source photographs for the Winold Reiss murals that decorate Union Terminal, Cincinnati Union Terminal Company records for 1940–1963 and 1968–1972, menus from the restaurants housed at Union Terminal, and papers from Save the Terminal Inc.

=== E.M. Skinner organ ===
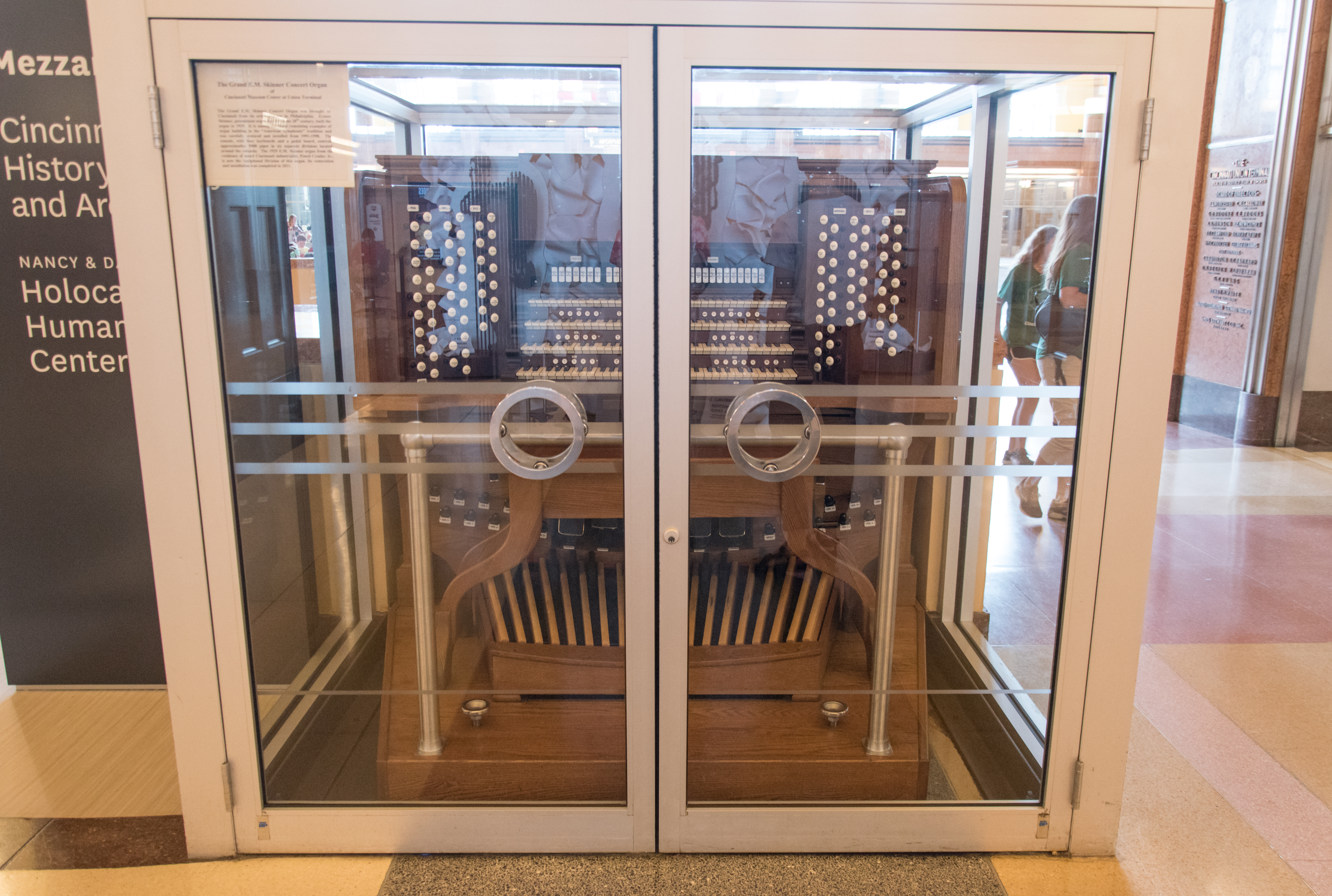
The Grand E.M. Skinner Concert Organ

The Grand E.M. Skinner Concert Organ is a blend of two former instruments. The primary instrument was the Skinner Opus 660, which was installed at Immaculate Conception Roman Catholic Church in East Germantown, a neighborhood of Philadelphia. The other portion is an antiphonal division, originally a smaller organ (Skinner Opus 726) in Powel Crosley Jr.'s Cincinnati residence, Pinecroft. The Opus 660 portion speaks from hidden chambers behind grills on either side of the hallway and stairs, grills that formerly fronted the terminal's ticket windows. The Opus 726 portion speaks from a chamber behind a window above the history museum entrance. Both instruments were built in 1929, when the station building began construction. The Skinner Opus 660 was sold to the museum center in 1987, which installed it during its 1990s renovations.

== Selected collection highlights ==
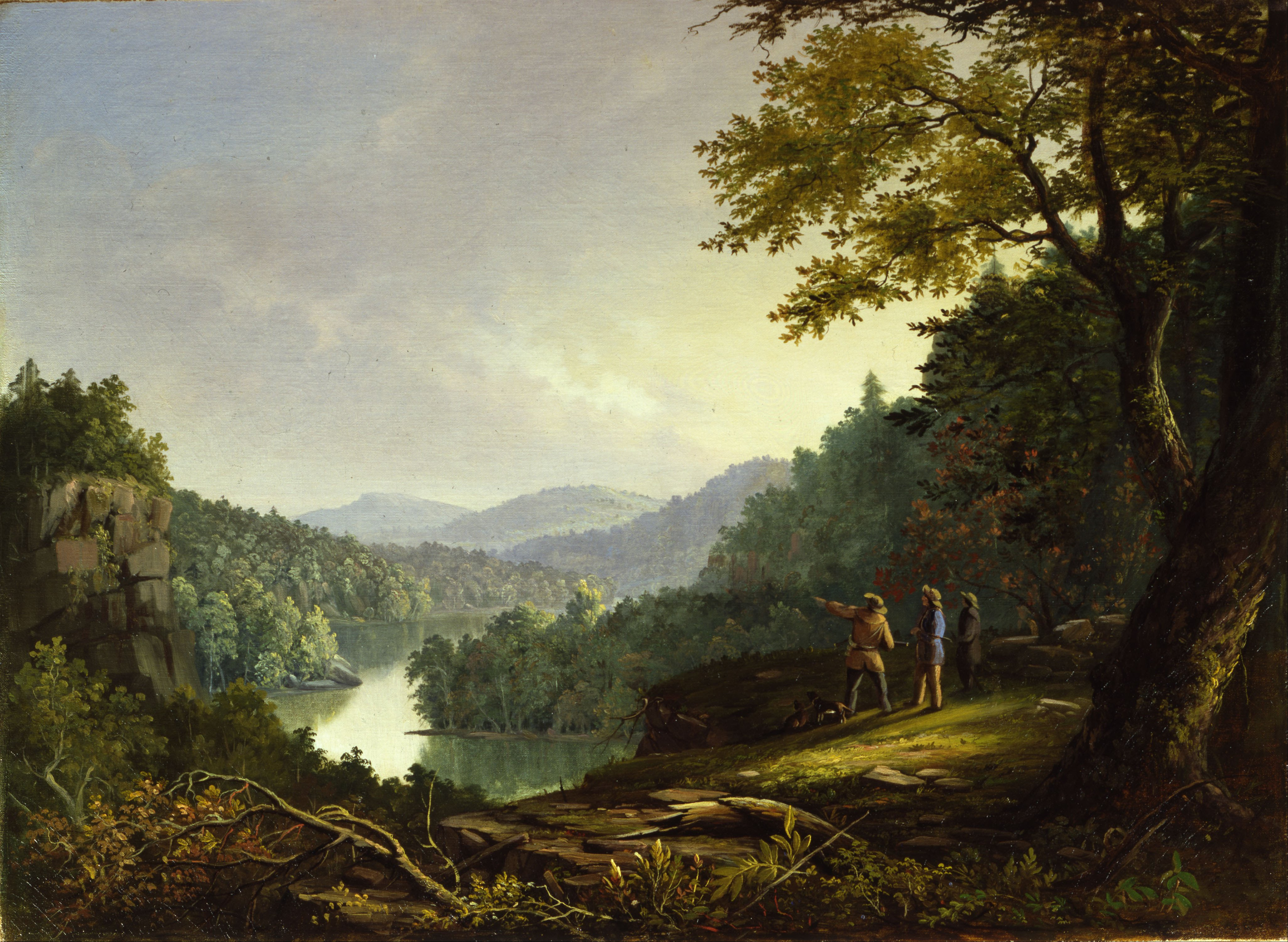
James Pierce Barton

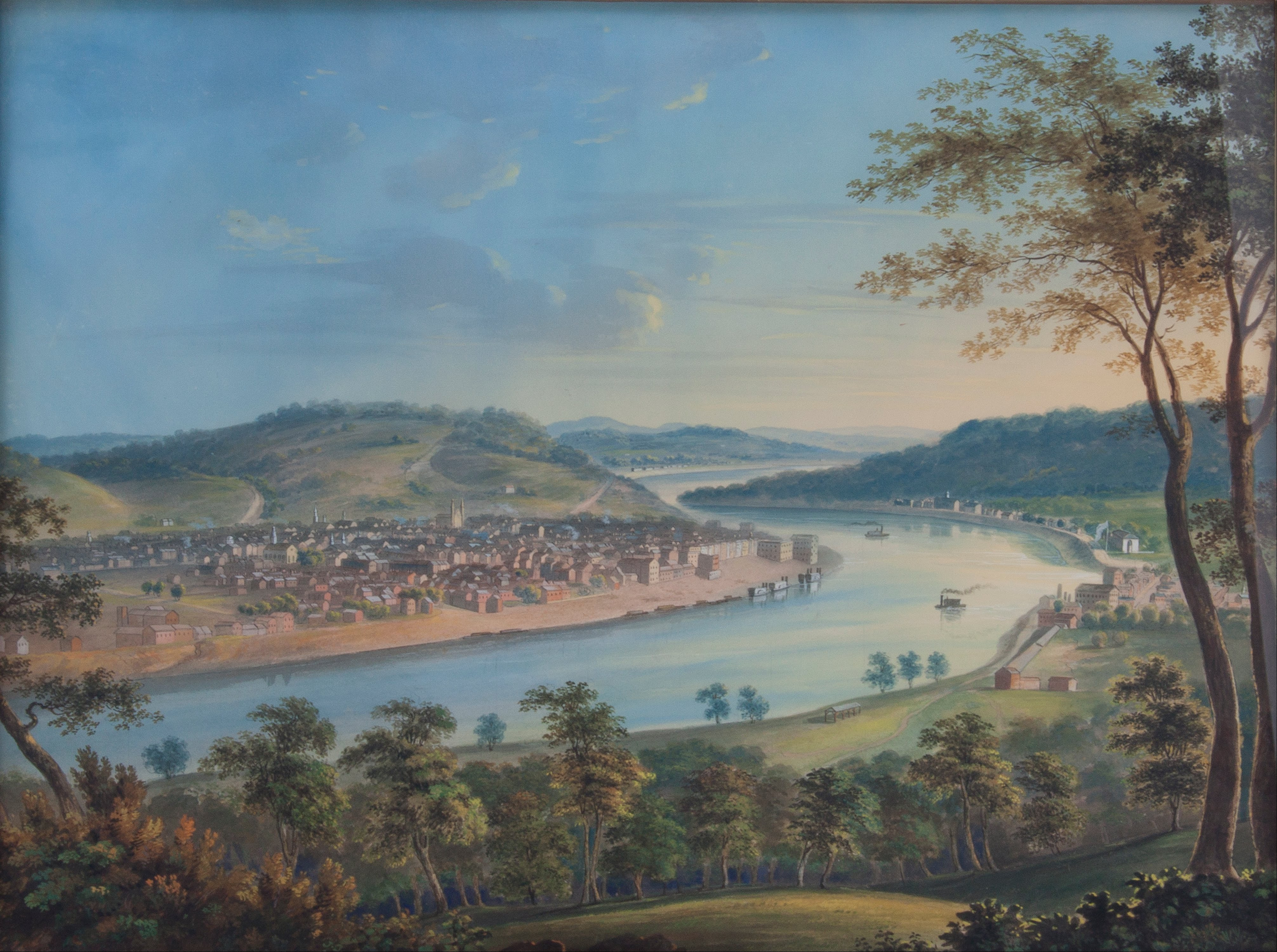
John Caspar Wild

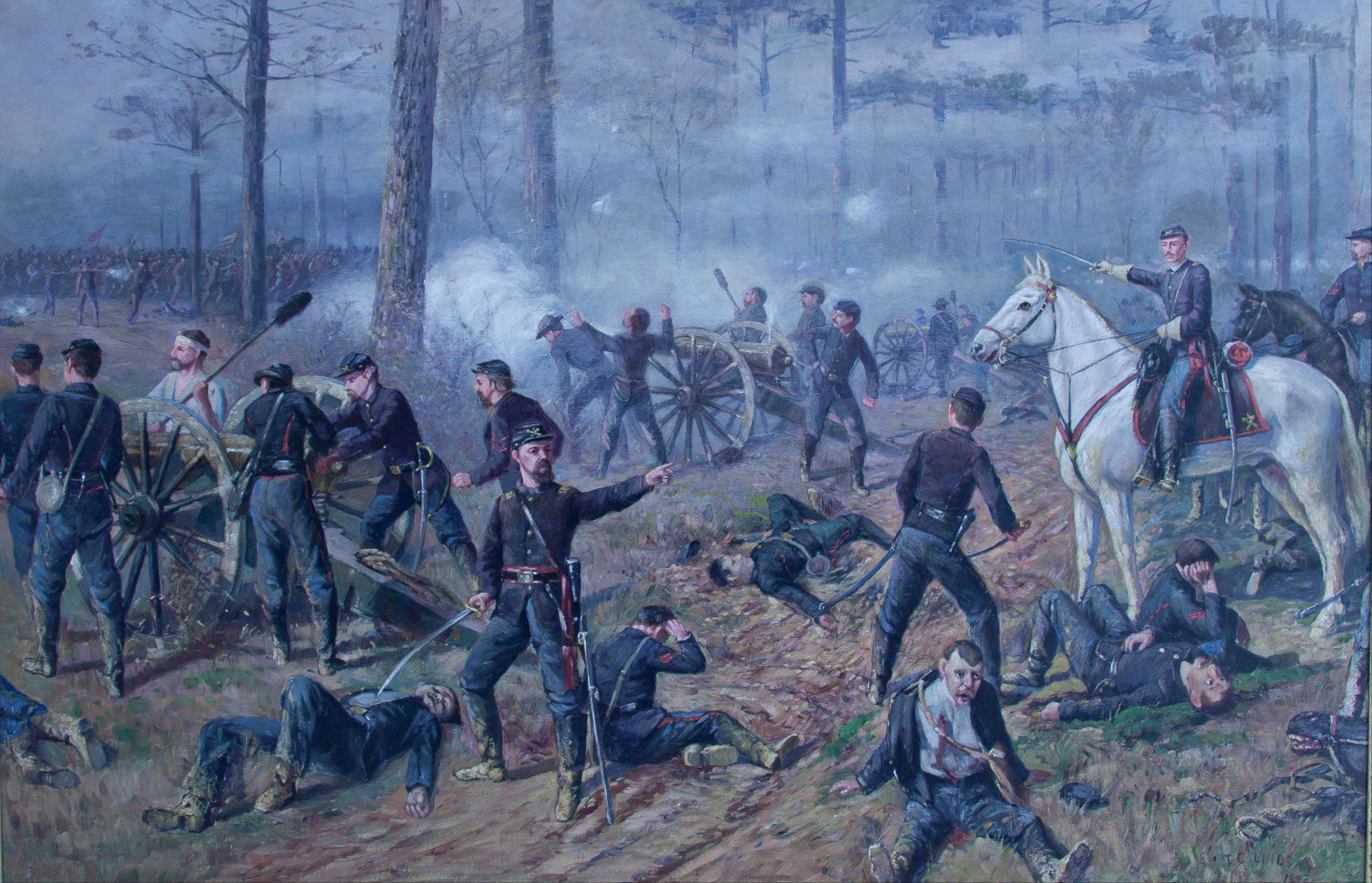
Thomas Corwin Lindsay
