= Cinergy =

American energy company

Cinergy Corporation
- Company type: Energy company
- Industry: Energy services
- Founded: 1994 (merger of Cincinnati Gas & Electric Company and PSI Energy)
- Defunct: 2006
- Fate: Acquired by Duke Energy
- Successor: Duke Energy
- Headquarters: Cincinnati, Ohio

Cinergy Corp. (/ˈsɪnərdʒi/ SIN-ər-jee) was an energy company based in Cincinnati, Ohio, United States, from 1994 to 2006. Its name is a play on the words "synergy", "energy", and "Cincinnati".

== History ==
Cinergy was created on October 24, 1994, from the merger of the Cincinnati Gas & Electric Company (CG&E) and Kentucky subsidiary Union Light, Heat & Power (ULH&P) with Plainfield, Indiana–based PSI Energy (Public Service Indiana).

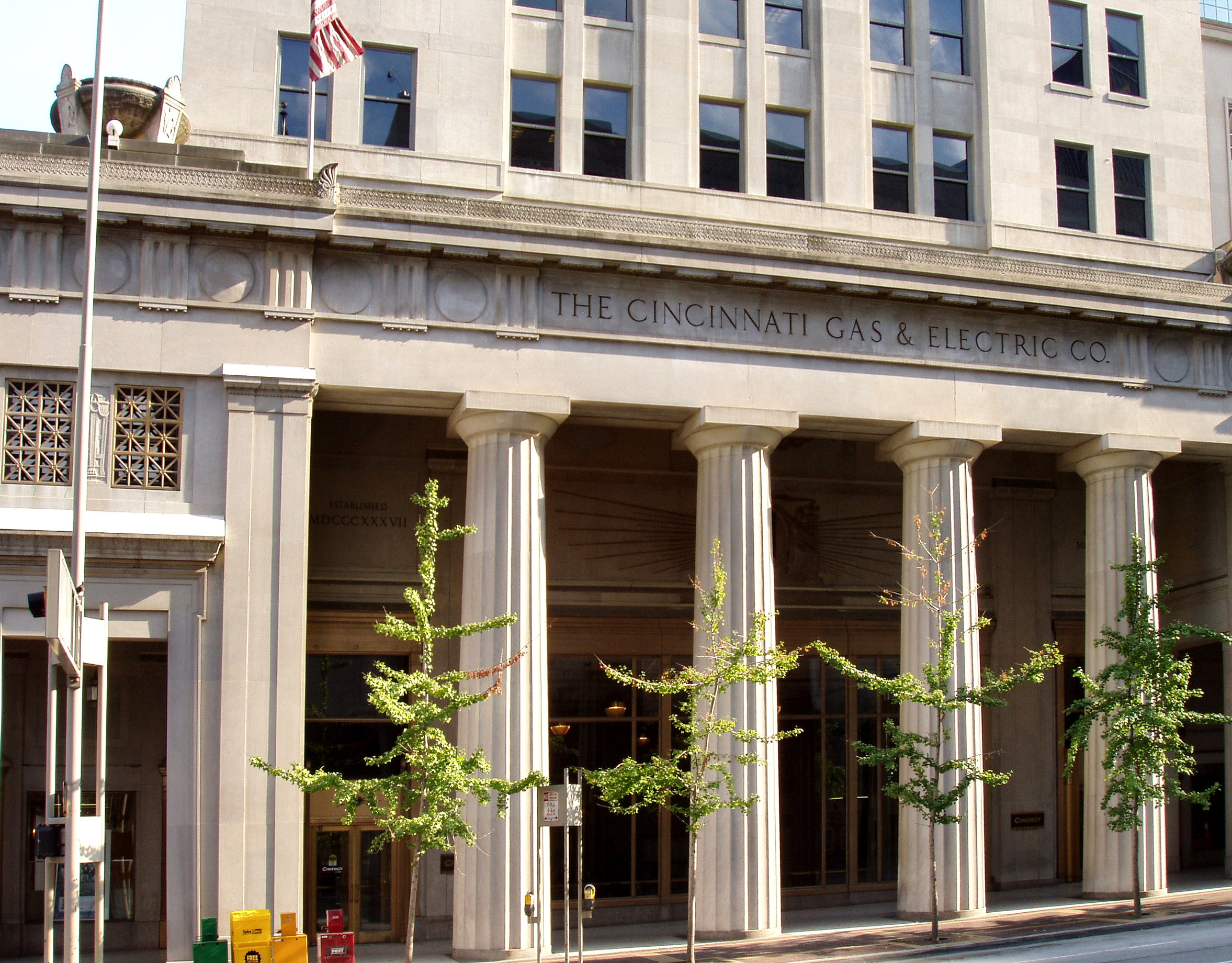
Cinergy's Cincinnati headquarters, now known as the Duke Energy Building.

In 1996, Riverfront Stadium in Downtown Cincinnati was renamed Cinergy Field in a sponsorship deal with Cinergy. The stadium was demolished by implosion in December 2002 to make way for Great American Ball Park.

In 2005, Cinergy announced a friendly acquisition by the larger Charlotte, North Carolina–based Duke Energy. The acquisition was completed on April 3, 2006. The combined company retains the Duke Energy name. Until the acquisition, Cinergy still operated under the names of the three local utilities (e.g., Cinergy/CG&E in Cincinnati); since the acquisition, the names of the three former Cinergy utilities and Duke Power, the former Duke Energy utility subsidiary, have been phased out, although signs bearing the former logos still remain at some substations.

== Environmental record ==
In May 2006, Cinergy was flagged as a key contributor to major pollution in the American Midwest, prompting the New York State government to sue the company and forcing the company to install modern pollution control equipment. The Ontario government, across the border in Canada, followed suit at the request of New York Attorney General Eliot Spitzer.

Researchers at the University of Massachusetts Amherst have identified Cinergy as the 49th-largest corporate producer of air pollution in the United States, with roughly 29 million pounds of toxic chemicals released annually into the air. Major pollutants indicated by the study include sulfuric acid, hydrochloric acid, chromium compounds, and manganese compounds.

== Holiday model train display ==
Under its various operating names, the company operated a holiday model train display that has attracted over 9 million visitors since the event's inception in 1946. The authentic display measures 36 1/2 by 47 1/2 feet (11.1 m × 14.5 m) long and imitates an O gauge, in which a quarter-inch on the model is equivalent to one foot on a real train.

Duke, in partnership with railway company CSX, continued to host the annual train display in Cinergy's former headquarters until 2011, when the display was donated to the Cincinnati Museum Center at Union Terminal.
