= Westwood Elementary =

Westwood Elementary School
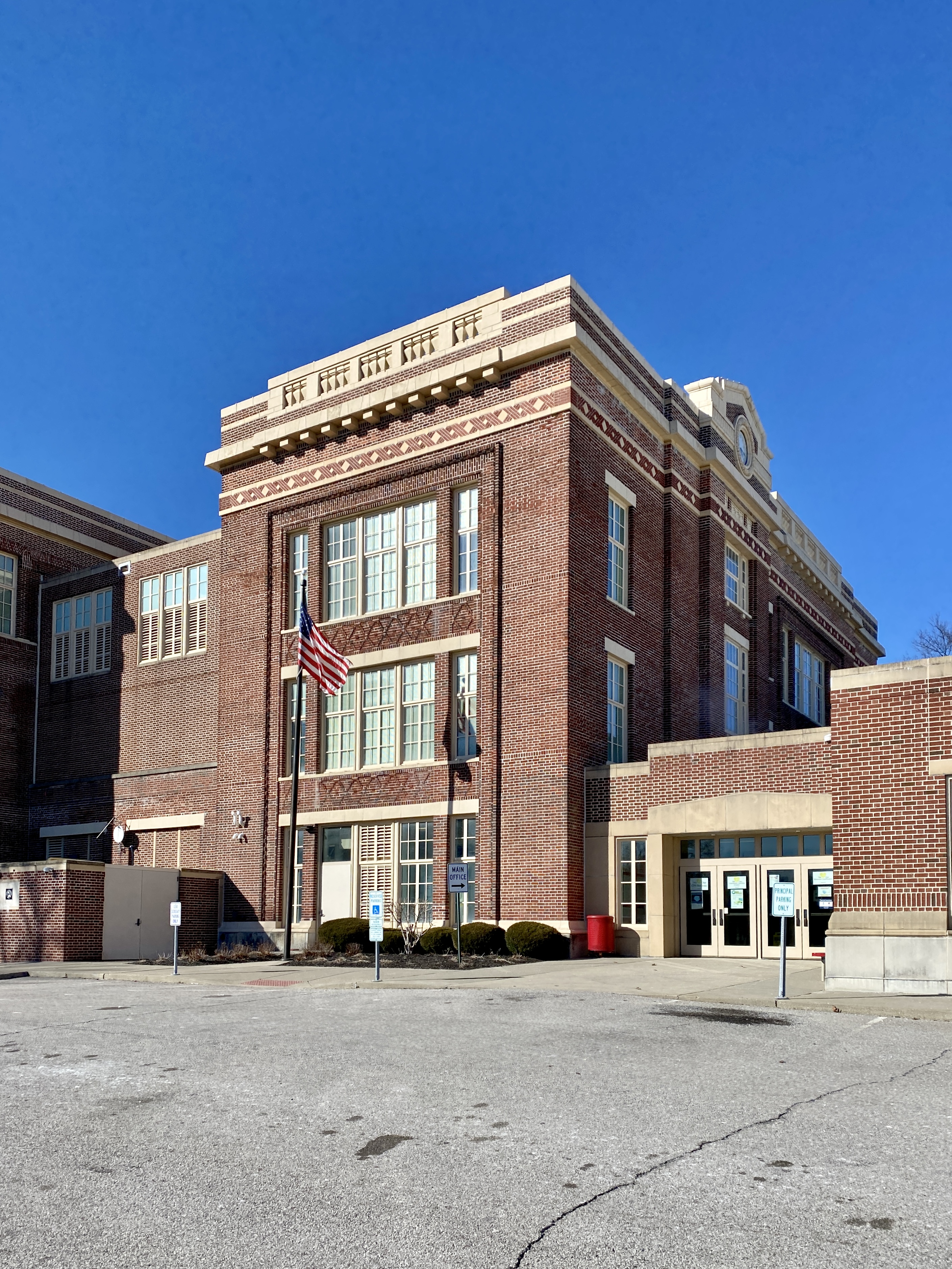

Location
- 2601 Westwood Northern Blvd (temporary during renovation); Cincinnati, Ohio 45211; United States
- Coordinates: 39°08′52″N 84°35′56″W

Information
- School district: Cincinnati Public Schools
- Teaching staff: 31 (as of 2007-08)
- Grades: PK-8
- Enrollment: 534 (as of 2007-08)
- Student to teacher ratio: 17.2 (as of 2007-08)
- Website: http://westwoodschool.cps-k12.org/

Westwood Elementary, formerly Westwood School is a historic school building in the Westwood neighborhood of Cincinnati, Ohio.

== History ==
The school building was constructed in 1909 replaced an earlier school building built in 1870 on the same grounds. The 1909 school was designed by prominent Cincinnati architect Frederick W. Garber's Garber & Woodward architectural firm. The building's 100th birthday was celebrated in the spring of 2009. The original floor plans were published in Modern School Houses, Part Two by The American Architect in 1915.

It was remodeled several times and a major renovation is underway. The building us in a district listed on the National Register of Historic Places and controversy over additions and their impact on community views emerged in 2007 and 2009 over the renovation plans. The design and location of a gymnasium and whether the renovation itself was cost effective or whether it would be better to demolish the school and build a new one have been debated. Access concerns for persons with mobility limitations were also addressed.
