= Lytle Tunnel =

Vehicular tunnel in Cincinnati, Ohio, US

Coordinates: 39°6′6″N 84°30′15″W

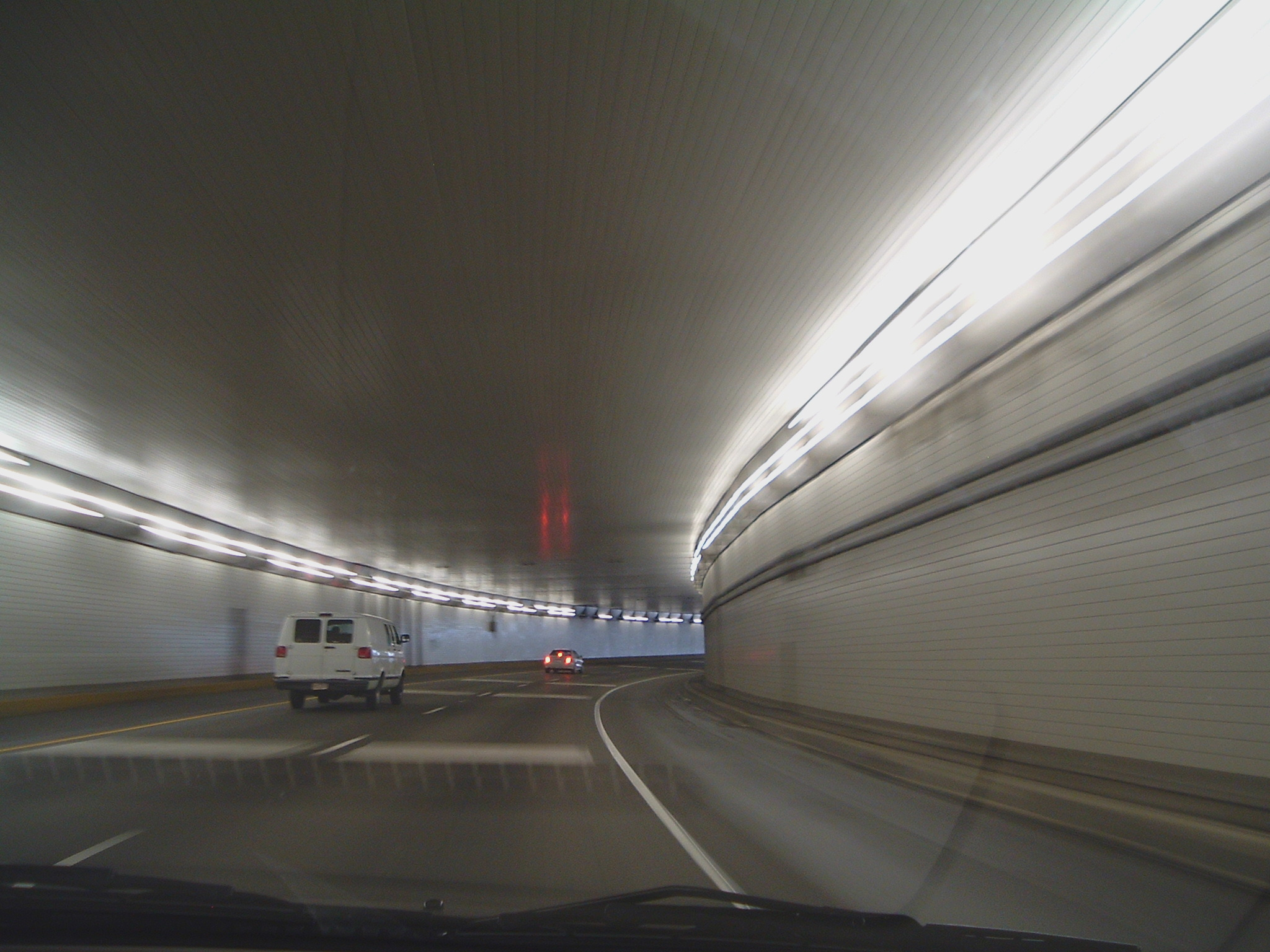
- Inside Lytle Tunnel
- Interactive map of Lytle Tunnel

Overview
- Location: Cincinnati, Ohio
- Route: I-71
- Start: Fort Washington Way
- End: Northeast Expressway

Operation
- Opened: 1970
- Operator: Ohio Department of Transportation
- Traffic: Automotive
- Character: Passenger

Technical
- Length: 335 metres (1,099 ft)
- No. of lanes: 6

The Lytle Tunnel is a vehicular tunnel that carries Interstate 71 (I-71) under the historic Lytle Park in Cincinnati, in the U.S. state of Ohio, connecting Fort Washington Way to the Northeast Expressway. It is a six-lane tunnel with three tubes. There is a two-lane southbound tube, a three lane-northbound tube, and a one-lane southbound tube that separates from the highway and serves as an exit ramp to the downtown area. The tunnel is ventilated by two grates in the northbound tube and the southbound exiting tube. It was completed in 1970. At 335 meters (1,099 feet), it is the longest vehicular tunnel in Ohio. It is also the only tunnel on I-71. Scenes from the 2025 film Superman were also filmed in the tunnel.

During the construction of the Lytle Tunnel, many historic buildings were razed for the project. The old Lytle Park was similar to a town square, with many Greek Revival buildings surrounding the park. On the park's east side is the Taft Museum of Art. A few of the original buildings remain, including the Literary Club of Cincinnati, the Anna Louise Inn, Guilford School building, and the Phelps Apartments.

A CB radio broadcast on channel 19, the most commonly used commercial trucking frequency, loops a warning about this turn and its hazards 24 hours a day, seven days a week.

== History ==
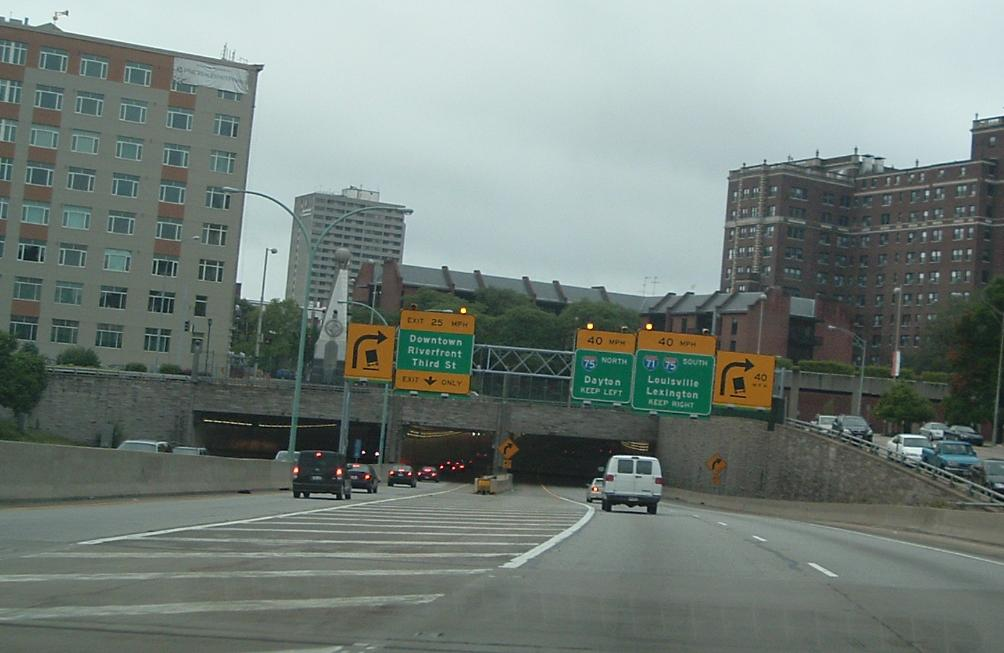
Northern entrance to the tunnel

During a period between January 2001 and May 2003, the tunnel was notorious for many truck accidents in the tunnel. The two main reasons for this were:

- Truck drivers were not obeying the 40 mph (64 km/h) warning signs at the beginning of the tubes.
- There was a sharp curve near and in the tunnel.

In May 2003, the Ohio Department of Transportation installed radar speed signs at the ends of the tunnel that would show the posted speed for trucks along with the actual speed of the vehicle. Hazmats and explosives are not allowed in the Lytle Tunnel.

Immediately after construction of the Lytle Tunnel, the 550 E Fourth Street apartments (2 buildings) and were built on air rights over the tunnel along with the reconstruction of Lytle Park, which became the first park built over an interstate highway.

== See also ==
- List of tunnels in the United States
- Lytle Park Historic District
