= William Lytle =

William Lytle may refer to:

- William Lytle (captain) (1728–1797), officer in the Continental Army during the American Revolution
- William Lytle II (died 1831), his son, Surveyor General of Illinois
- William Haines Lytle (1826–1864), his nephew, Ohioan poet and politician
- William Lytle, father of Rob Lytle, American football player

== See also ==
- Lytle family
