= St. Philomena's Church (Cincinnati, Ohio) =

Church building in Cincinnati, OH

St. Philomena's Church was a Roman Catholic church located 619 East Third Street at East Pearl Street, in downtown Cincinnati, Ohio. The church was named in honor of St. Philomena, a popular saint of the period. This parish was founded to serve the growing tide of German-speaking Catholic population in Cincinnati, it was the fourth German Catholic Parish in Cincinnati.

The cornerstone was laid August 23, 1846. Rev. Louis Huber, O.S.F., and after him, Rev. B. Hengehold, directed the building of the church. The dedication ceremonies were performed by Archbishop John Baptist Purcell, May 21, 1848, though services had been held since the January previous in the uncompleted building. The school house was erected in 1865, the parsonage in 1872. The congregation numbered 200 families in 1896. Services were no longer held in German after World War I began.

Because of the church's location near the riverfront, St. Philomena's steeple was a well-known landmark on the Cincinnati skyline. On July 7, 1915 a tornado damaged the steeple. The steeple fell on a building across Pearl Street. (See link)

The Parish was closed in 1954. Records for this Parish are located at the Chancery Office of the Archdiocese of Cincinnati, 100 E. 8th St., Cincinnati, Ohio 45202.

In the late 1950s much of Cincinnati's historic riverfront including St. Philomena's Church was cleared for the construction of the Fort Washington Way and later the Lytle Tunnel.
