= FWW =

FWW may refer to:

- Farmer Wants a Wife, a British television series
- Fighting with Wire, an Irish rock band
- First World War, a global war fought between 1914 and 1918
- Food & Water Watch, an American consumer rights organization
- Fort Washington Way, a freeway in Cincinnati, Ohio, United States
