= Stephen Joseph McGroarty =

Irish American soldier (1830–1870)

- Stephen Joseph McGroarty
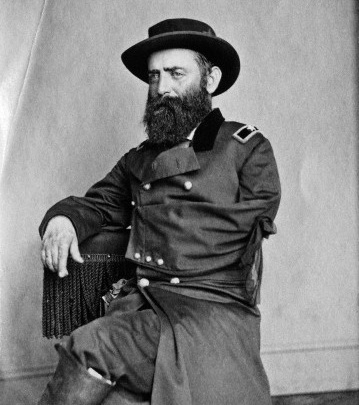
- Born: 1830; Mountcharles, County Donegal
- Died: January 2, 1870 (aged 39–40); College Hill, Ohio
- Burial place: Spring Grove Cemetery
- Military career
- Allegiance: United States of America; Union
- Branch: Union Army
- Service years: 1861–1865
- Rank: Colonel; Brevet Brigadier General
- Unit: 10th Ohio Infantry Regiment
- Commands: 50th Ohio Infantry Regiment; 61st Ohio Infantry Regiment
- Conflicts: American Civil War

Stephen Joseph McGroarty (1830 – January 2, 1870) was an Irish American soldier who served in the Union Army during the American Civil War.

== Biography ==
=== Early life ===
McGroarty was born in Mountcharles, Donegal, Ireland, in 1830. He emigrated to the United States at the age of three. His parents settled in Cincinnati, Ohio, where he was educated in St. Francis Xavier College. After graduation he engaged in the dry-goods business in partnership with an uncle, but left it at the end of five years to study law. He was admitted to the bar and began practice at Toledo, but subsequently returned to Cincinnati, where he achieved a reputation as a criminal lawyer.

=== Military career ===
When the civil war began he raised a company of Irish Americans and served with them in the 10th Ohio Infantry under William Haines Lytle for three months, afterwards re-enlisting in the 10th for three years. At the Battle of Carnifex Ferry he received a gunshot wound through the right lung. As soon as he recovered he returned to the field and was appointed colonel of the 50th Ohio Infantry by the Governor of Ohio David Tod. The 50th was afterward merged into the 61st, and he commanded the latter till the end of the war. At the Battle of Peachtree Creek on July 20, 1864 his left arm was shattered at the elbow by a minié ball in the beginning of the engagement, yet he remained with his men through the fight. He was accustomed to expose his life with the utmost hardihood, and during the war received twenty-three wounds. He was brevetted brigadier-general of volunteers on May 1, 1865.

=== Later life ===
He was for two years collector of internal revenue, and just before his death, which resulted from injuries received in battle, was elected clerk of the Hamilton County, Ohio courts.

McGroarty died in College Hill, Ohio on January 2, 1870. He was originally buried at Old St. Joseph's Cemetery in the Price Hill neighborhood of Cincinnati, Ohio but was moved to Spring Grove Cemetery in Cincinnati in 1912 to be next to his wife.
