= Guilford High School =

Guilford High School may refer to:

- Guilford High School (Connecticut)
- Guilford High School (Illinois), in Rockford
- Guilford School building in Cincinnati, Ohio

== See also ==
- Gilford High School, New Hampshire
- Guildford High School, Surrey, England
- Southwest Guilford High School, High Point, North Carolina
