= Lytle Park Historic District =

Historic district in Ohio, United States

- U.S. National Register of Historic Places
- U.S. Historic district
- Cincinnati Local Historic Landmark
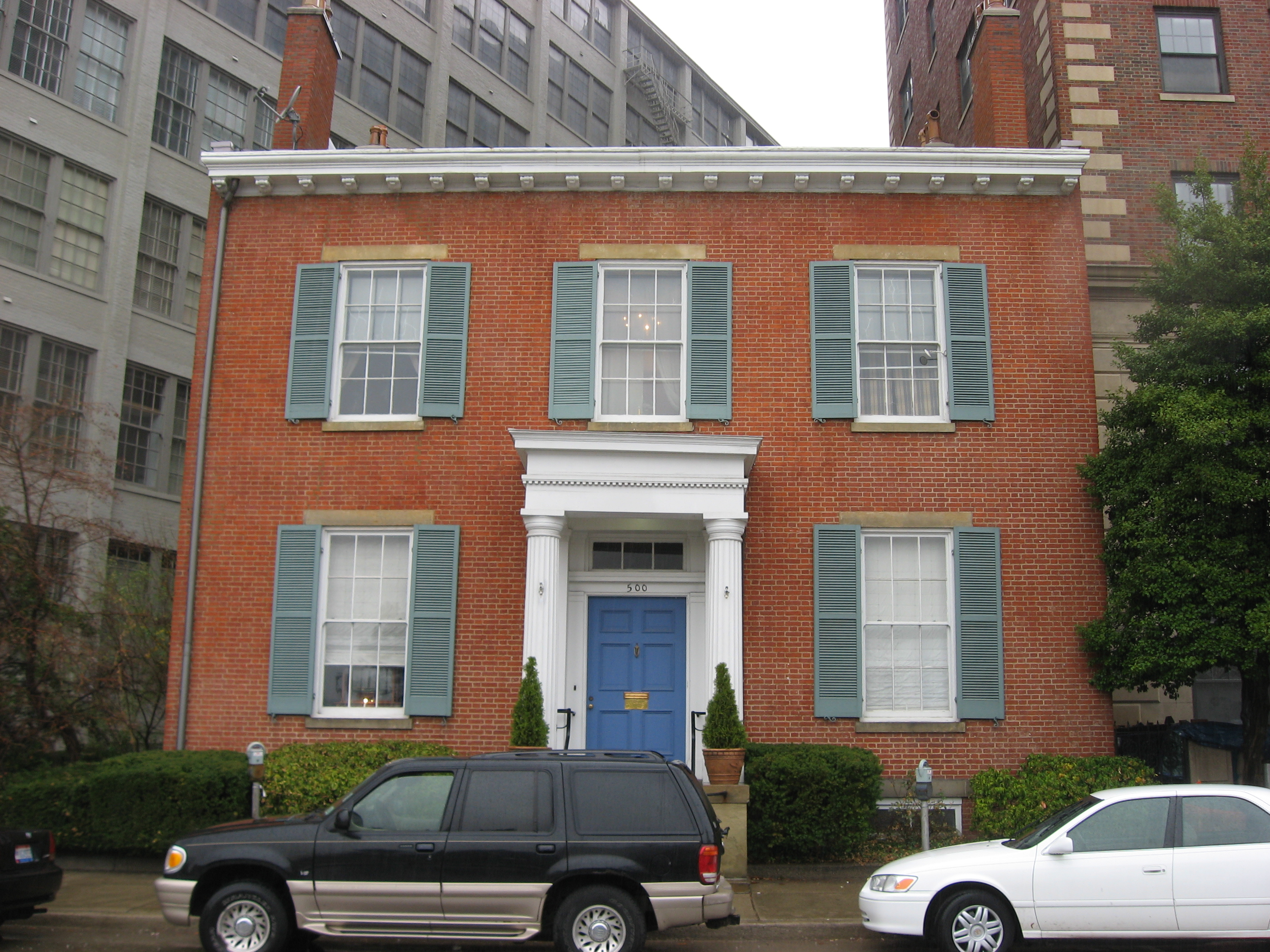
- Literary Club building

- Location within Ohio Location within the United States
- Location: Roughly bounded by 3rd, 5th, Sycamore, Commercial Sq., and Butler Sts., Cincinnati, Ohio
- Coordinates: 39°6′4″N 84°30′19″W
- Area: 50 acres (20 ha)
- Architectural style: Greek Revival, Italianate, Georgian
- NRHP reference No.: 76001435
- Added to NRHP: March 26, 1976

Lytle Park Historic District is a historic district in Cincinnati, Ohio, United States. Roughly bounded by 3rd, 5th, Sycamore, Commercial Sq., and Butler Sts. in downtown Cincinnati, it centers on Lytle Park.

In 2014, Western & Southern Financial Group, owner of many properties within the Lytle Park Historic District asked the city to remove historic status of several historic buildings. The company hopes to demolish sections of the district in order to build new office space.

== Lytle Park ==
Lytle Park has a storied history and represents one of the oldest areas in the city. Originally a hardwood forest, the park and its vicinity was the early site of Fort Washington, built in 1789 to protect early settlers of the Ohio River town from Indian attacks. Mathias Denman, Robert Patterson, John Filson and Israel Ludlow, met on the land of their new purchase, then called Losantiville (future Cincinnati). The land that would become Lytle Park was covered in trees just like most of the landscape. In 1789, the settlement of Losantiville was picked as the perfect place for a fort for the headquarters of the army during the Indian wars. Fort Washington was located right around where the Guilford School Building now stands (now the office of Eagle Realty Group). Fort Washington was designed by Major John Doughty. Directly to the east of the fort, Doughty also laid out a garden and a peach orchard with saplings from Fort Harmar in Marietta Ohio.

Dr. Richard Alison was the surgeon general for Fort Washington. In the 1790s he built a small house in the peach grove were Lytle Park now sits. His horse, Jack, received a bullet in the head during the battle of Fallen Timbers. That horse kept going carrying the good doctor and 3 wounded soldiers out of danger. The bullet remained imbedded in the horse’s skull, and afterwards when the Doctor would be riding his horse through Losantiville it was the favorite joke of his to remark "that his horse had had more in his head than some doctors he had known." Allison and Jack, the horse, retired from Army life in 1796. Dr. Alison practiced medicine in Cincinnati from his office on Broadway Street until his death in 1816 you can visit him in Wesley cemetery in Northside.

The site next served as the homestead of the prominent Lytle family. Surveyor General of the Northwest Territory William Lytle II built his house there in 1809, about ten years prior to the completion of the neighboring Martin Baum mansion (now the Taft Museum of Art). Lytle II was known for helping set up the first bank in Cincinnati called the Miami Exporting Company, along with other reputable men of the day. He was the first president of the Cincinnati Humane Society and one of the founders of the University of Cincinnati.

Martin Baum was the son of German immigrants. He fought with Mad Anthony Wayne at the battle of Fallen Timbers and was in charge of the medical supplies. In 1820 he built a home on Pike Street he named Belmont and what is now The Taft Museum of Art. He hired a German named Johannes Staubler, who designed the estates gardens. He and Staubler planted grapes, built arbors and planted many beautiful flower and shrubs. It was said to be the most beautiful garden in the entire city. Unfortunately, Martin Balm had to sell his home in 1826 because of financial problems.

Nicolas Longworth lived in the Baum house from 1829 until his death in 1863. He was a very wealthy lawyer, land owner and philanthropist. He had a keen interest in horticulture. Some of his vineyards covered the hill sides of Eden Park where he grew Catawba grapes to make sparkling Catawba wine. There is a story about how in 1855 Abraham Lincoln, who was a lawyer at the time, was in Cincinnati for the court case of McCormack vs Manny. The other lawyers froze Lincoln out and were very rude to him, so Lincoln took to taking walks around the city. One day he found himself on Pike Street at the estate of Belmont and he entered the beautiful garden. Longworth was out tending his garden as usual and Lincoln, thinking Longworth was just a gardener, asked if he could look around the gardens. Longworth himself gave Lincoln a tour and was very kind to him. Could this be the reason for the statue of Lincoln by sculptor George Gray Benard given to the city in 1917 by then Belmont resident, Charles P Taft?

The land was long known as Lytle Square was purchased by the City of Cincinnati in 1905 and Lytle Park was dedicated July 6, 1907.

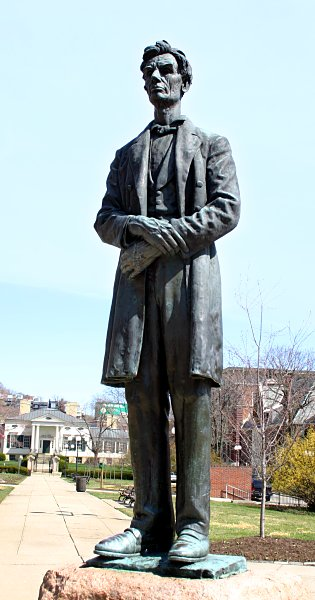
Statue of Lincoln with the park and the Taft Museum visible in the background

The 11-foot (3.4 m) bronze statue of Abraham Lincoln facing the entrance of the park was commissioned by the Charles P. Taft family. The unusually beardless statue is the only public monument to an individual ever produced by sculptor George Grey Barnard. The statue was dedicated amid great fanfare on March 31, 1917, by former president William Howard Taft. The adjacent U.S. Marine Corps Memorial is a granite boulder with bronze plaque and Marine emblem atop a globe. It was dedicated in 1921.

When an expressway was planned to be built downtown, Lytle Park faced its possible demise. Former Mayor Charles P. Taft went to Washington to fight for the right to restore buildings on top of the proposed tunnel and for the next six years groups of citizens from all over the city fought to preserve the area. In a non-competitive bid process, Western & Southern was eventually awarded the rights to develop an apartment building in exchange for a concrete slab to "cap" the portion of the new freeway trench running under the new structure, with public tax dollars used for the far bigger part under the park itself. When the Lytle Tunnel was completed in 1970, Lytle Park was the first park to be located above an interstate road.

Described as an "urban oasis", Lytle Park is known for its large seasonal flower beds of tulips and chrysanthemums in entirely urban surroundings.

== Properties contained within the historic district ==
In 1976, the buildings around the park were declared a historic district, and the resulting Lytle Park Historic District was listed on the National Register of Historic Places. The district includes examples of the Georgian (Literary Club of Cincinnati), Greek Revival, and Italianate architectural styles, as it was an elite residential district from the early days of Cincinnati's history kept free of surrounding industry.

=== List ===
- Baum-Taft House (Taft Museum)
- Literary Club of Cincinnati
- Former Anna Louise Inn building (built 1909, to be converted into a hotel)
- Christ Church Cathedral
- Guilford School building (1914)
- Lytle Park
- Phelps building (built 1926, now Residence Inn Cincinnati Downtown)
- Police Station No. 2
- University Club of Cincinnati
- Western & Southern Financial Group building
