= Fort Washington (Ohio) =

18th c. fort in present-day Cincinnati, Ohio, United States

- Part of the Northwest Territory of the United States
- Cincinnati, Ohio
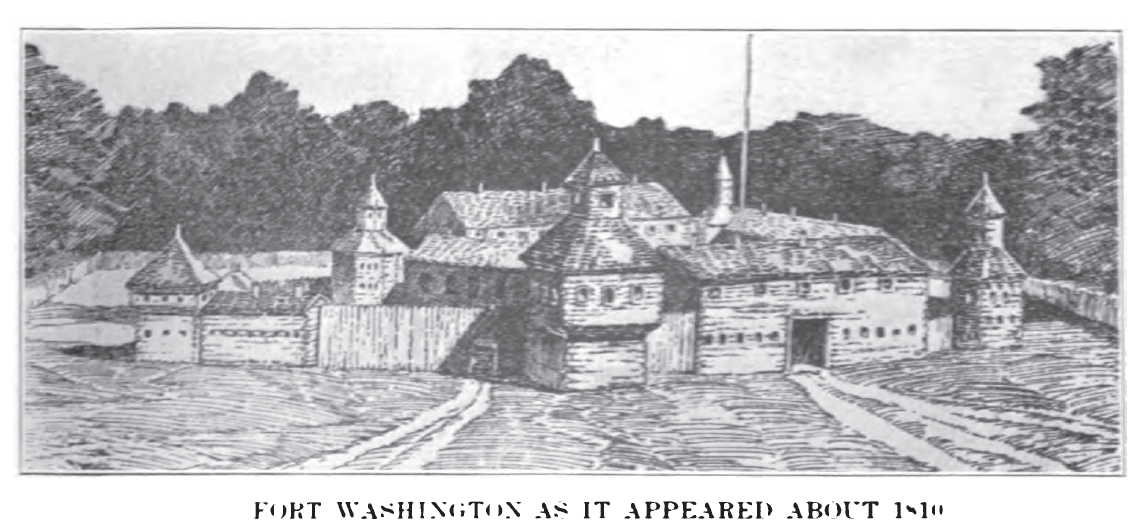

Site information
- Type: Army Fortress

Location
- Coordinates: 39.0998°N 84.5047°W

Site history
- Built: 1789
- Demolished: 1806
- Battles/wars: Northwest Indian War

Garrison information
- Past commanders: Gen. Arthur St. Clair, Gen. Josiah Harmar, Gen. "Mad" Anthony Wayne, Gen. James Wilkinson
- Occupants: United States Army

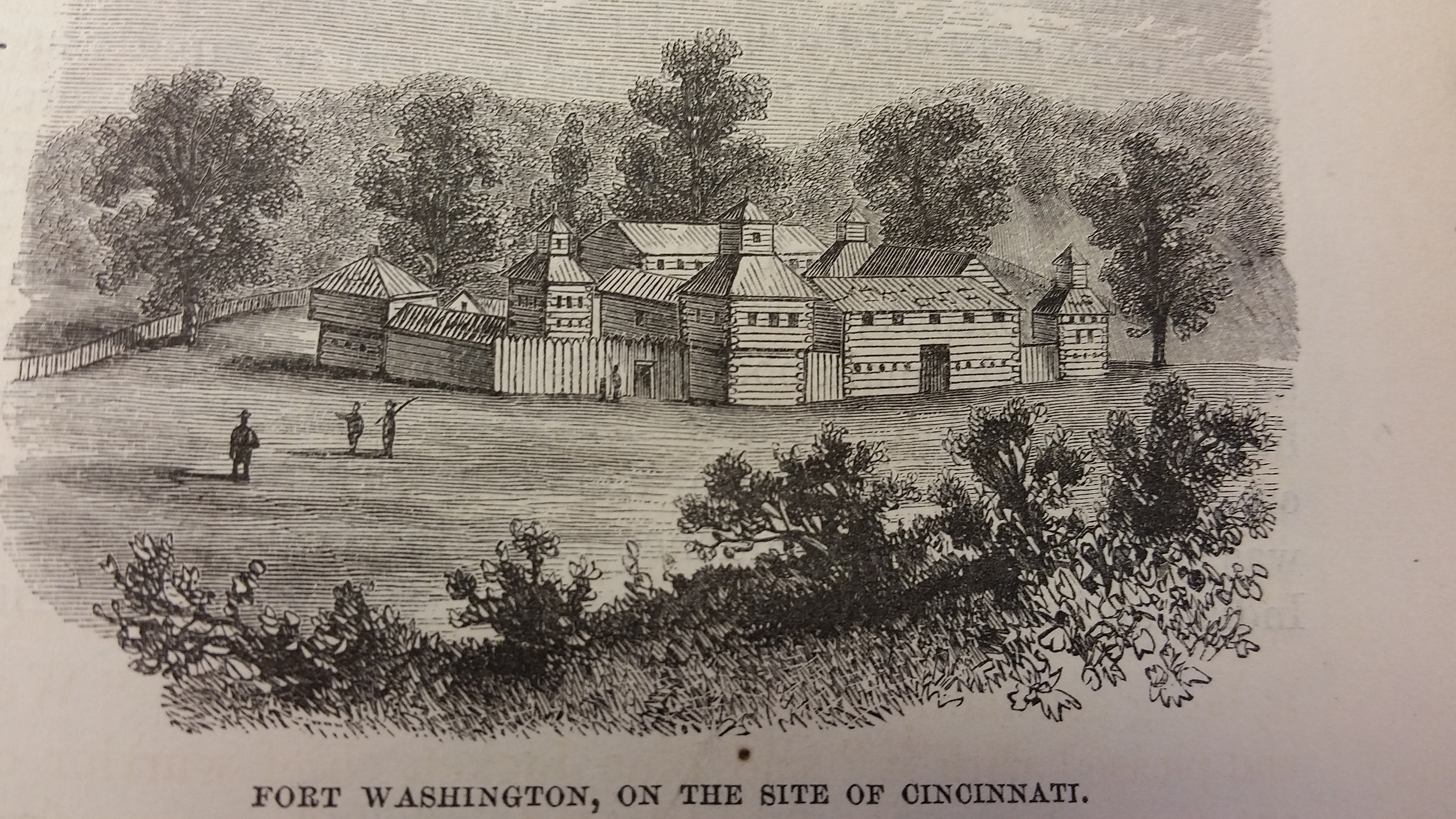
Fort Washington

Fort Washington was a fortified stockade with blockhouses built by order of Gen. Josiah Harmar starting in summer 1789 in what is now downtown Cincinnati, Ohio, near the Ohio River. The physical location of the fort was facing the mouth of the Licking River, above present day Fort Washington Way. The fort was named in honor of President George Washington. The fort was the major staging place and conduit for settlers, troops and supplies during the settlement of the Northwest Territory.

In 1803, the fort was moved to Newport, Kentucky, across the river and became the Newport Barracks. In 1806, the site of the abandoned fort was divided into lots and sold.

== History ==
=== Losantiville ===
When Judge John Cleves Symmes contracted with the Continental Congress to purchase 1,000,000 acres in southwestern Ohio known as the Symmes Purchase in 1788, it reserved 15 acres to the federal government for a fort. In summer 1789, Fort Washington was built to protect early settlements located in the Symmes Purchase area, including Losantiville, Columbia and Northbend.

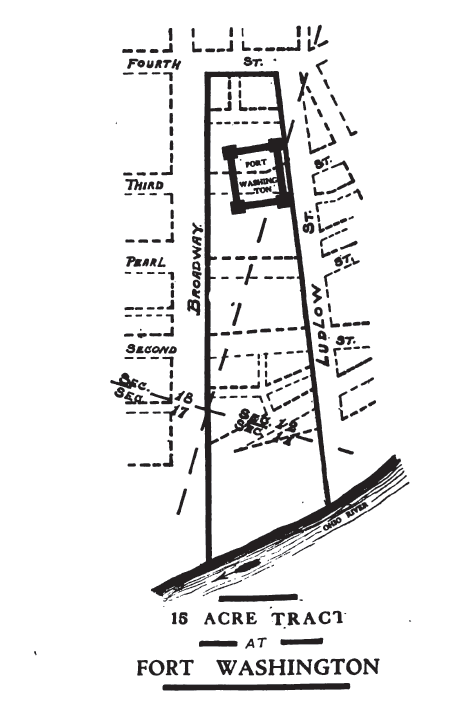
Fort Washington in Cincinnati

Gen. Arthur St. Clair was appointed governor of the Northwest Territory by vote of Congress on October 5, 1787. When Governor St. Clair arrived at Losantiville [Cincinnati] the settlement consisted of two small hewed log houses and several cabins. Maj. John Doughty, under orders from Gen. Josiah Harmar, was engaged with a small military force in finishing the construction of Fort Washington. The population of the crude village, exclusive of the military, probably did not exceed one hundred and fifty. Three days after Gen. Harmar took up his quarters at Fort Washington, on January 1, 1790, Governor St. Clair was received with due ceremony by the troops and citizens of Losantiville.

Fort Washington was distinguished by its large size: it was larger than a modern city block and designed to house up to 1500 men. Gen. Josiah Harmar described it as "one of the most solid substantial wooden fortresses. . .of any in the Western Territory." The stockade's walls were two stories high with blockhouses located at each corner.

=== Indian campaigns ===
The fort was used as a staging point and to supply all the northern forts. It played a key supporting role in three Indian campaigns: Harmar's Campaign 1790, St. Clair's Campaign 1791, and Gen. "Mad" Anthony Wayne's campaign in 1793-94.

In 1790, Harmar used Fort Washington to launch an expedition against Native Americans in northwest Ohio, especially the Miami Indians, whose principal city was Kekionga (modern-day Fort Wayne, Indiana). On October 22, 1790, Gen. Harmar's army was ambushed and massacred by Indians led by Chief Little Turtle. The Indians of the Northwest Territory were in open revolt aided by the British. Indian raids came close to Cincinnati, despite the presence of the nearby Fort Washington.

In the spring of 1793, Major General Anthony Wayne moved his forces from the training center at Legionville, PA, down the Ohio River by barge to a camp outside Fort Washington that was called Hobson's Choice. In the fall, Wayne departed Fort Washington and moved his army northward, past Fort Jefferson, to build Fort Greene Ville.

=== Decline and sale ===
By 1802, Fort Washington had fallen into disuse and disrepair, and was manned by only half a company (about 35 men). In 1803 it was replaced by the larger Newport Barracks established to house the Kentucky Militia. It was opened just across the Ohio River in Newport, Kentucky. James Taylor Jr., an influential resident of Newport, Kentucky, had lobbied his cousin James Madison to place the post in Newport.

On February 28, 1806, Congress directed the Secretary of the Treasury to cause the site of the abandoned fort to be surveyed and laid off into lots, streets and avenues conforming to the plan of the city, and to sell the lots to the highest bidders at a sale at the Cincinnati Land Office. The survey, certified July 8, 1807, shows the fort's boundaries to be Fourth Street to the north, Ludlow Street to the east, the Ohio River to the south, and Broadway to the west.

== Rediscovery ==
In October 1952, excavators discovered the remnants of Fort Washington's gunpowder magazine under the northeast corner of Broadway and Third streets, at the site at which Western & Southern Life Insurance Company's parking garage was to be constructed. Researchers with the Historical and Philosophical Society of Ohio first visited the site on October 13, 1952.

The fort's name is retained in Fort Washington Way, a section of Interstate 71 and U.S. Route 50 that runs through downtown Cincinnati and passes just in front of the former fort. The highway was given this name in 1958 by the city's Anthony Wayne Parkway Board in consideration of prior discovery of the fort's gunpowder magazine nearby.

The location is marked by a plaque at the Guilford School building, at 421 E 4th St, Cincinnati, which now occupies the site.
