= Fort Lytle =

- U.S. National Register of Historic Places
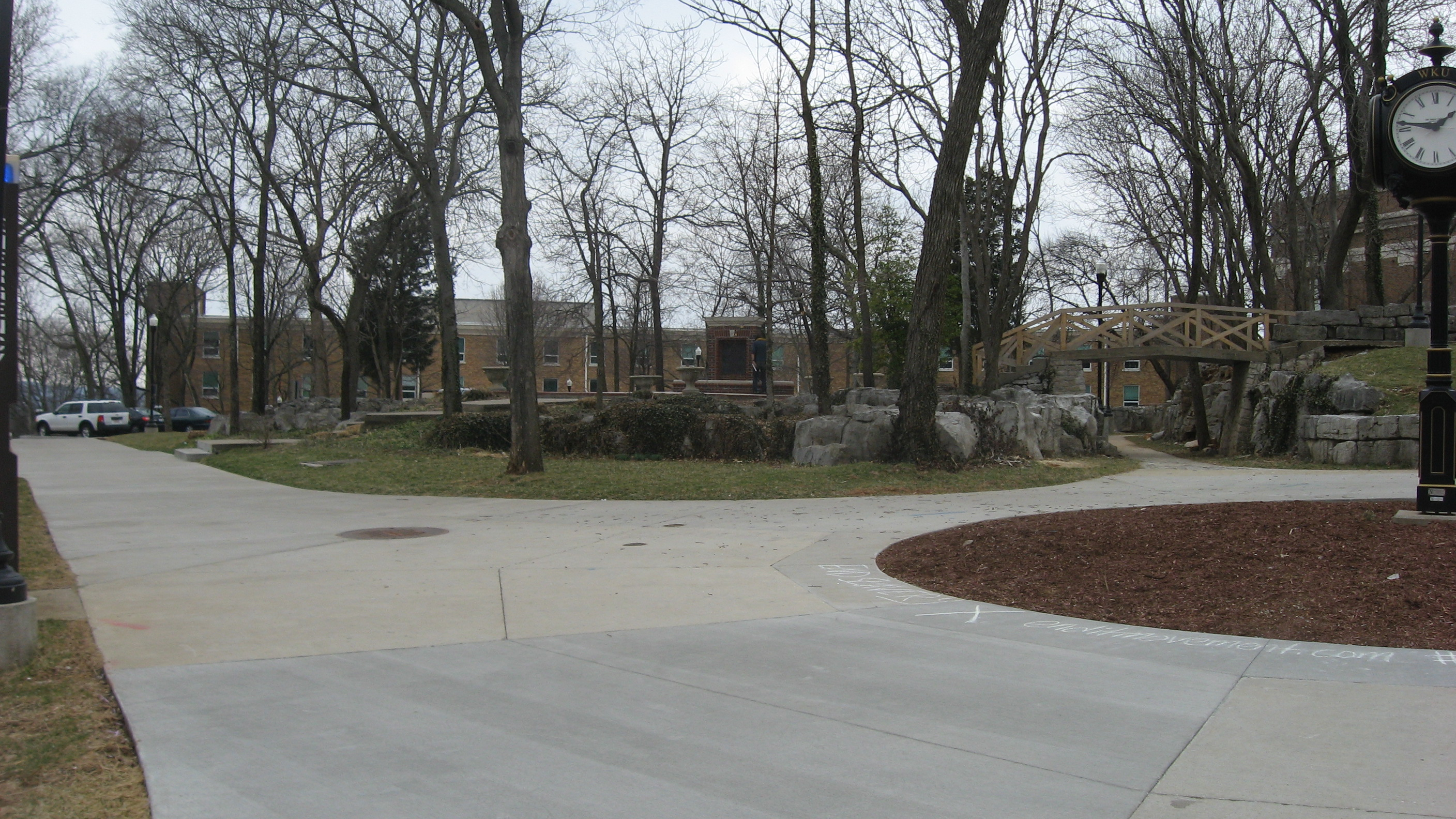

- Location within Kentucky Location within the United States
- Location: Western Kentucky University, Bowling Green, Kentucky
- Coordinates: 36°59′15″N 86°27′08″W
- Area: 0.5 acres (0.20 ha)
- Built: 1861
- Built by: Buckner, General Simon Bolivar; Harrison, Colonel Benjamin
- MPS: Warren County MRA
- NRHP reference No.: 84000848
- Added to NRHP: December 5, 1984

Fort Lytle is an American Civil War fort located on what is now the campus of Western Kentucky University in Bowling Green, Kentucky. It was listed on the National Register of Historic Places in 1984.

The fort was built in 1861 by Confederate army troops under General Simon Bolivar Buckner at the peak of Vinegar Hill and was named Fort Vinegar. It was renamed for William Haines Lytle after his 1863 death leading a cavalry charge in the Battle of Chickamauga. The hill was later called College Hill.

It was later improved by the Union army under Colonel Benjamin Harrison.
