= Alfred Bettman =

Alfred Bettman (August 26, 1873 in Cincinnati– 1945) was one of the key founders of modern urban planning. Zoning, as it is known today, can be attributed to his successful arguments before the U.S. Supreme Court, which resulted in the 1926 decision in favor of the Village of Euclid, Ohio versus Ambler Realty Company.

The concept of the "Comprehensive Plan," as used in most cities across the U.S., was in no small part due to the work of Bettman and Ladislas Segoe on the "Cincinnati Plan." (See City Plan for Cincinnati) Bettman also created the "Capital Improvements Budget."

Bettman's planning work was interrupted in 1917 when President Wilson appointed him as a special assistant to Attorney General Thomas Watt Gregory. Assigned to the War Emergency Division, he was in charge of Espionage Act cases with John Lord O'Brian. At the end of the war, President Wilson granted clemency to over 100 prisoners on Bettman's recommendation.
