= Literary Club of Cincinnati =

- U.S. Historic district – Contributing property
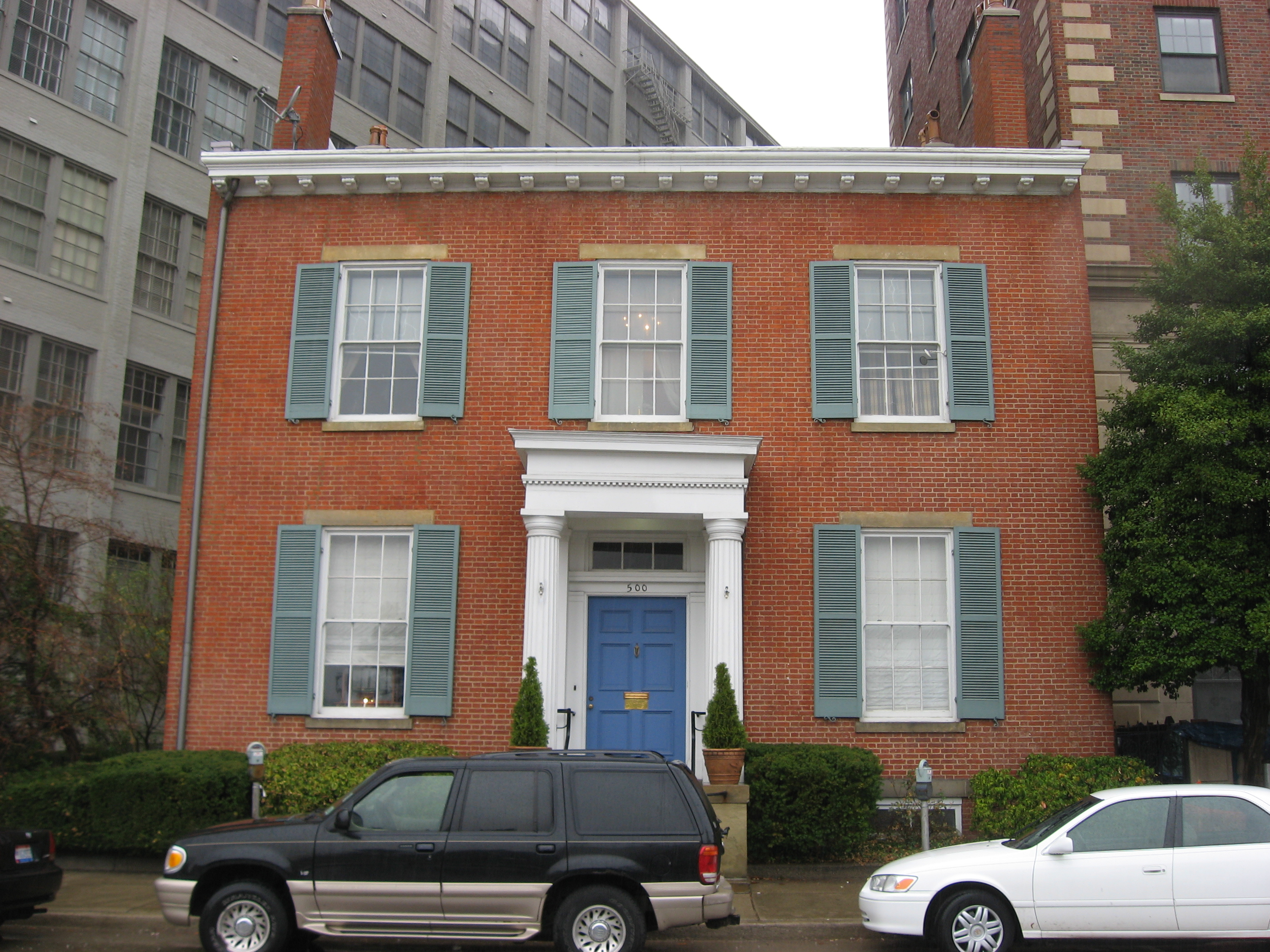
- Front of the clubhouse

- Location within Ohio Location within the United States
- Location: 500 E. Fourth St., Cincinnati, Ohio
- Coordinates: 39°6′5″N 84°30′16.8″W
- Built: 1820
- Architectural style: Greek Revival
- Part of: Lytle Park Historic District (ID83001985)

The Literary Club of Cincinnati is located at 500 East Fourth Street, across from Lytle Park in downtown Cincinnati, Ohio. The club occupies a two-story Greek Revival house which was built in 1820, on the site of the home of William Sargent, secretary of the Northwest Territory. The Club was founded in 1849; its membership is limited to 100 men.

The club was founded by woman's rights activist and abolitionist John Celivergos Zachos, Stanley Matthews (judge), Ainsworth Rand Spofford librarian of congress and 9 others. One year later President Rutherford B. Hayes became a member. Other prominent members included President William Howard Taft and notable club guests Ralph Waldo Emerson, Booker T. Washington, Mark Twain, Charles Dickens, Oscar Wilde and Robert Frost.

Today, the clubhouse is a contributing property to the Lytle Park Historic District, a historic district that is listed on the National Register of Historic Places.

Among the important roles of the Literary Club is that of historian, who delivers an annual paper on a topic of his choosing that deals with the history of the club. The long-time historian was John A. Diehl, who was elected a member of the club in 1965. After his more than two decades in the post, the club published a book of his papers as historian. The current historian is Robert Vitz.
