= City Plan for Cincinnati =

The City Plan for Cincinnati is a set of plans to guide the development of Cincinnati. Cincinnati was first surveyed and laid out by Israel Ludlow in 1794. The earliest modern plan was the 1907 Park Plan created by George Kessler. Every 20 or 30 years since then new comprehensive plans have been created as the city has grown.

== Ludlow Layout ==
Israel Ludlow bought land from John Cleves Symmes and was the first surveyor and town planner in Cincinnati. He laid out the city with a north-south, east-west grid like many towns in the Northwest Territory. This grid unfortunately ignored topography, and no space was reserved for parks or open space except the public landing on the river.

== 1907 Park Plan ==
In 1907 George Kessler, a nationally-known landscape architect, was hired to create a park plan for the city. His plan, however, dealt not only with the 18 parks and 17 public squares/recreational areas contained in it, but, as historian Zane Miller wrote, it was "to inspire civic patriotism by encouraging the construction of monumental public and quasi-public buildings in an impressive downtown setting, to bring all the neighborhoods of the city closer together by improving cross-town and downtown commuter circulation, and to mitigate the problems of traffic congestion and children playing in the streets."

== 1925: Official Plan of the City of Cincinnati ==
Cincinnati was the first city in the United States to have a comprehensive plan approved by City Council. Sponsored by the United City Planning Committee and paid for by donations, the plan was started in 1922 and finished in 1925. It was led by Alfred Bettman, a Cincinnati lawyer; Ladislas Segoe, an immigrant planner from Hungary; and George B. Ford and Ernest P. Goodrich, of New York, the owners of the first American planning consulting firm. The plan was long range, seeking to reduce the influence of machine politicians on the city government. The plan built on previous transportation, park, and utilities plans. The 1925 plan called for the construction of the Western Hills Viaduct and what is now Cincinnati Union Terminal. It was unique in controlling the growth of new subdivisions by requiring installation of utilities prior to approval.

Of the 135 structures existing in Cincinnati parks today, nearly half were produced during the period from 1929 to 1943.

The original plan was for the United City Planning Committee to raise $70,000 and the City to contribute $30,000. Donations were sufficient that in the end the city did not contribute anything.

The 1925 Plan has two parts: Zoning (1924) and Capital Improvements (1925)

The Charter Party and Murray Seasongood came to power shortly after the 1925 plan was adopted. Both were seen as reactions to boss rule in Cincinnati.

== 1948: Cincinnati Metropolitan Master Plan ==
1948 master plan

Alfred Bettman also led the development of the 1948 plan. This plan was part of the urban renewal movement and attempted to modernize the inner city. The 1948 plan called for the large-scale demolition of the historic Kenyon-Barr and Central Bottoms neighborhoods, to be replaced by Fort Washington Way, a redeveloped central riverfront, and the industrial district newly named as Queensgate. It extended the scope of the plan to include Kentucky and Indiana as well as new topics, such as employment. The 1948 Plan was well timed to take advantage of the Federal Housing Act of 1949.

== 1980: Coordinated City Plan ==
The 1980 plan consisted of three volumes and a fourth summary volume.

Volume I: "Strategies for Current Physical Development"

Volume II: "Strategies for Comprehensive Land Use"

Volume III: Details plans for vision from volume II

Volume IV: Goals, policies, projects

== 1992: The Cincinnati Parks and Greenways Plan ==
The Cincinnati Parks and Greenways Plan was approved by the city council in December 1992.

== The Banks ==
The Banks is an urban neighborhood on the Cincinnati Riverfront. Planned in the late 1990s, it includes two sports stadiums and the National Underground Railroad Freedom Center.

== 2012: Plan Cincinnati ==
The City reformed the Planning Department in 2007. In 2009 it launched an effort to create a new plan. It set aside half a million dollars in 2009-2010 for the effort. It includes:

- Housing and Neighborhood Development
- Economic Development and Business Retention
- Transportation and Transit
- Health, Environment and Open Space
- Land Use
- Historic Preservation
- Urban Design
- Utilities and Infrastructure
- Institutions
- Intergovernmental Cooperation
- Fiscal

== See also ==
- Kessler Plan, George Kessler's 1910s-1930s plan for Dallas, Texas
