= Fort Washington Way =

Freeway in Cincinnati, Ohio, United States

Fort Washington Way
- Interstate 71 / U.S. Route 50
- Fort Washington Way highlighted in red

Route information
- Maintained by ODOT
- Length: 0.9 mi (1,400 m)
- Existed: June 29, 1961–present

Major junctions
- West end: I-71 / I-75; I-75 / US 50
- East end: I-71; US 50

Location
- Country: United States
- State: Ohio

Highway system
- Ohio State Highway System; Interstate; US; State; Scenic

Fort Washington Way is an approximately 0.9-mile-long (1.4 km) section of freeway in downtown Cincinnati, Ohio, United States. The eight-lane divided highway is a concurrent section of Interstate 71 (I-71) and U.S. Route 50 (US 50) that runs from west to east from an interchange with I-75 at the Brent Spence Bridge to the Lytle Tunnel and Columbia Parkway.

Fort Washington Way is named after Fort Washington, a fort that preceded the establishment of Cincinnati. One of the city's first freeways, it was conceived in 1946 as the Third Street Distributor in conjunction with a major urban renewal project along the riverfront. It opened in 1961 after one of the most expensive road construction projects per mile in the United States. Fort Washington Way's complex system of ramps made it the most crash-prone mile of urban freeway in Ohio. During the late 1990s, it was rebuilt with a simpler, more compact configuration, improving traffic safety and facilitating the riverfront's redevelopment as The Banks.

== Route description ==
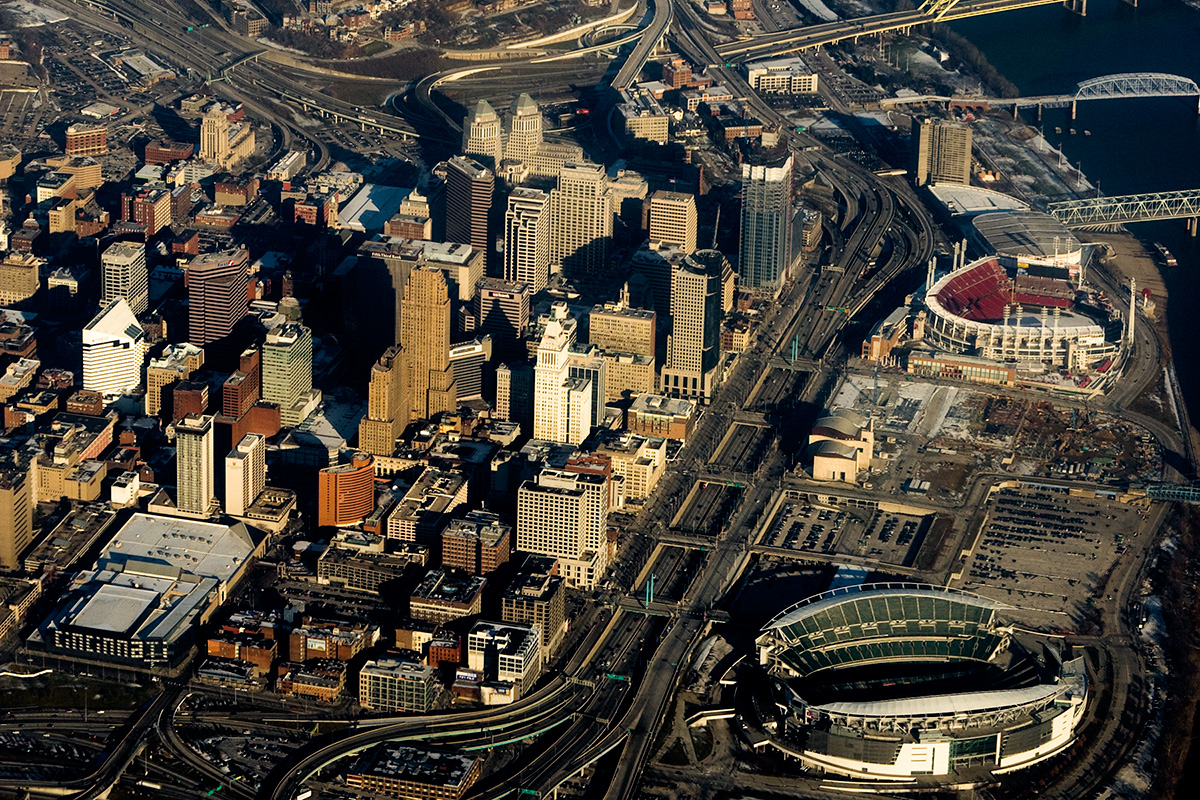
Downtown Cincinnati in 2009, with Fort Washington Way running from center bottom to top-right.

Fort Washington Way begins at a complex interchange with I-75 at the northern end of the Brent Spence Bridge. It ends a short distance later at a fork in the road. I-71 curves eight degrees to the north before entering the Lytle Tunnel, while US 50 continues east on Columbia Parkway via the Third Street Viaduct.

The entire highway lies in a 25-foot-deep (7.6 m), 150-foot-wide (46 m) trench parallel to Second Street and Pete Rose Way to the south and Third Street to the north. Together, these roadways form a collector-distributor system. There are five overpasses along Fort Washington Way; the overpasses at either end are cable-stayed. The Riverfront Transit Center runs parallel to Fort Washington Way, in a tunnel beneath Second Street. The Cincinnati Bell Connector streetcar system crosses over Fort Washington Way twice, on Walnut and Main streets, with a stop on Second Street above the Riverfront Transit Center.

A 30-foot-tall (9.1 m) flood wall and pumping station protect Fort Washington Way from Ohio River floodwaters. The pump is activated when the river reaches 60 feet (18 m), as measured from the Roebling Suspension Bridge. The Fort Washington Way corridor also includes a combined sewer overflow mitigation system and fiber optic backbone.

== History ==
=== Background and planning ===
The eastern terminus of present-day Fort Washington Way was originally the site of an army fortress, Fort Washington, from 1789 to 1803. During much of the 19th century, the area south of Third Street was a working-class neighborhood, the Central Bottoms, which had 10,000 residents. From the 1870s to the mid-20th century, the Bottoms gave way to warehouses as residents moved to the West End. By 1940, the Bottoms had a population of only 1,700 and was mostly vacant.

The Bottoms was inundated during the Ohio River flood of 1937. After the flood, the United States Army Corps of Engineers called for a flood wall to protect the downtown area but not the Bottoms. Areas below Third Street were declared too costly to protect from flooding. Meanwhile, the city's City Planning Commission was considering the issues of increasing automobile congestion on downtown city streets and the deterioration of the central riverfront. In 1946 and 1947, the commission issued reports proposing a "Third Street Expressway Distributor" linking the city's various entry points:

The junction of the Millcreek, Northeast and Dixie Expressways north of the Ohio River and immediately south of the Cincinnati Central Business District demands a design treatment of heroic nature. Free flow of traffic must be maintained. Complicated interlocking traffic movements should be kept independent as far as possible. Therefore an elaborate interchange to provide for both through movement and local distribution of traffic is necessary. Such a facility has been devised and is called the Third Street Distributor. ... The Distributor is thus not limited to a clearly-defined section between two exact points, but rather is an elongated intersection or interchange for the expressways.

Fort Washington Way appears in the 1948 Cincinnati Metropolitan Master Plan as the "Third Street Distributor".

In 1948, City Council adopted the Cincinnati Metropolitan Master Plan, which incorporated the Third Street Distributor along with long-range plans to completely redevelop the Bottoms as a mixed-use development, including a new baseball stadium to replace Crosley Field. The distributor would double as a flood wall for the central business district.

Planners estimated that, together, the three freeways "would divert between 60 and 70 per cent of the 88,000 vehicles which enter Cincinnati's business district [daily]". With bridge traffic across the Ohio River making up only 14% of total traffic entering and exiting Cincinnati's core area, the commission found "no valid reason for aligning the two Expressways directly with bridges across the Ohio River". Instead, the Mill Creek and Northeast expressways would both connect to the John A. Roebling Suspension Bridge via elevated ramps. The distributor would direct downtown-bound traffic directly to parking lots and garages. It was projected to handle the bulk of downtown traffic in 1970. (In the 1960s, a significant increase in interstate traffic would necessitate the construction of the Brent Spence Bridge as a direct connection to the freeways.)

Pioneering urban planner Ladislas Segoe, who served as a general consultant for the city's Master Planning Division, had urged the city to connect the Mill Creek and Northeast freeways with a Liberty Street distributor in Over-the-Rhine, instead of building a "great wall" between the riverfront and the central business district. However, downtown department store owners successfully pushed for the riverfront highway, threatening to leave for the suburbs otherwise. The Citizens' Development Committee, headed by Cincinnati Gas & Electric executive Reed Hartman, championed a $16 million bond drive to fund the riverfront redevelopment project, which included the Third Street Distributor.

=== Construction ===
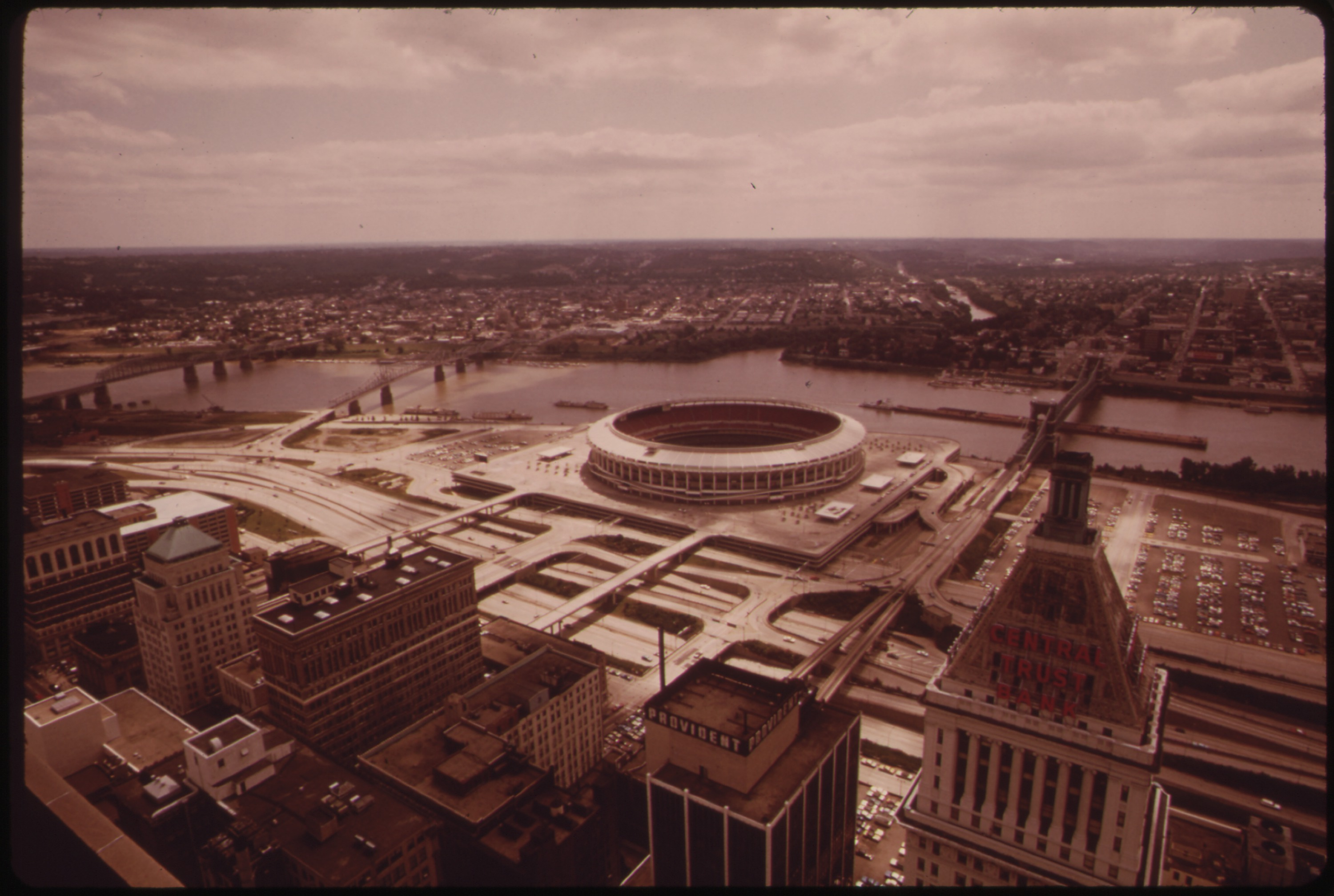
Fort Washington Way and Riverfront Stadium in 1973

On August 8, 1955, construction began on the first of many "piers" in the distributor system, a one-quarter-mile (0.40 km) connector between the Louisville & Nashville Bridge and the Third Street Viaduct. Work began in earnest with the passage of the Federal Aid Highway Act of 1956, which allocated federal funds to the $21 million project. In January 1958, demolition began on Third Street buildings, including St. Philomena's Church, to make way for the distributor.

The Cincinnati Times-Star editorial board proposed that the new highway be named "Fort Washington Freeway". The fort's gunpowder magazine had been rediscovered a few years earlier on land near the highway's path. Supporters of the Fort Washington name included the Cincinnati Enquirer editorial board and Mrs. William T. Buckner, a representative of the Daughters of the American Revolution and Daughters of 1812 whose great-grandfather William Henry Harrison once served at the fort. On February 20, 1958, the state's Anthony Wayne Parkway Board threw its support behind this name and also proposed naming the Mill Creek and Northeast expressways after General Anthony Wayne and George Rogers Clark, respectively. Other suggestions for the distributor included "Queen City Freeway" (after the city's nickname, "Queen City of the West"), "Cincinnati Gateway", "Queen's Freeway", and "Cincinnatus Parkway" (after Lucius Quinctius Cincinnatus, the city's namesake). The city chose "Fort Washington Way" that March.

On June 29, 1961, Fort Washington Way opened to traffic. At approximately $10 million per mile, Fort Washington Way, along with the Third Street Viaduct that connected it to Columbia Parkway, was one of the most expensive road construction projects in the United States. Modern Highways magazine called it "fantastically complex". Though it had only two through lanes in either direction, Fort Washington Way measured 680 feet (210 m) wide, enough for 11 lanes, cutting off the central business district from the riverfront. During the Riverfront Stadium project from 1968 to 1970, numerous left-hand entrance and exit ramps were added in close proximity. By the time the Lytle Tunnel opened in 1970, Fort Washington Way's 23 entrance and exit ramps were the densest set of ramps in the country. Fort Washington Way was one of five local landmarks featured in the title sequence of the CBS sitcom WKRP in Cincinnati.

=== Reconstruction ===
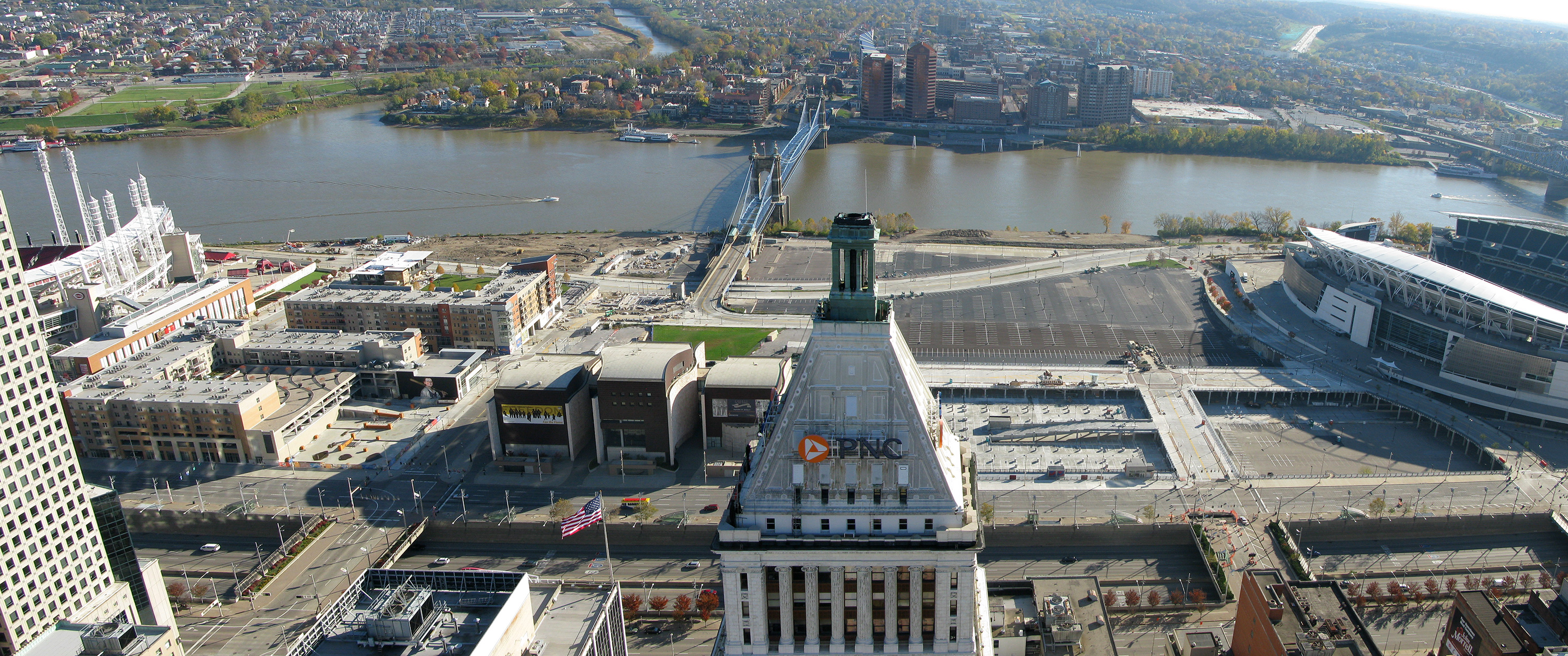
The Banks (center) and Fort Washington Way (bottom) in 2011.

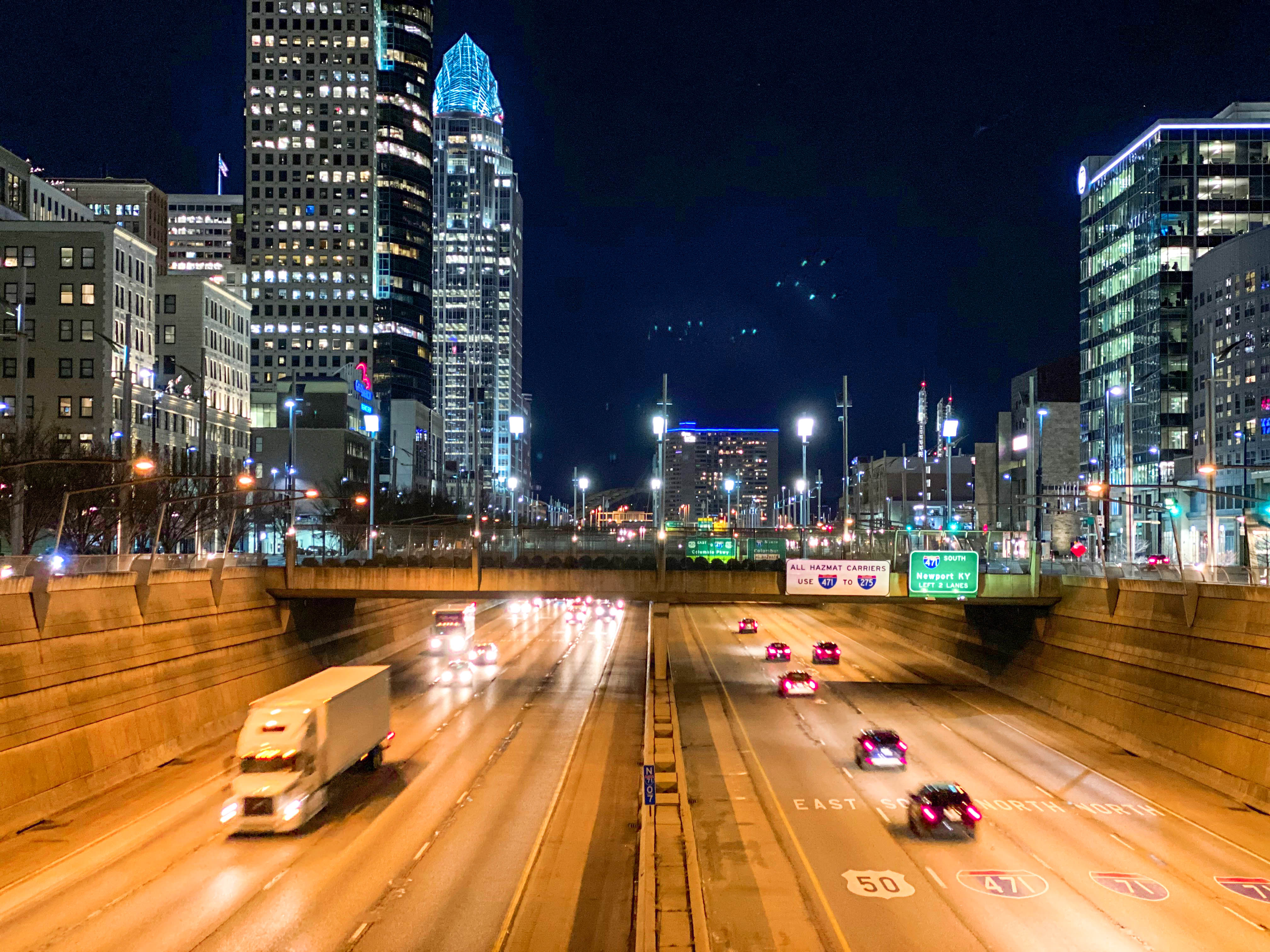
Looking east on Fort Washington Way from the Elm Street overpass, the western end of the proposed highway deck.

Fort Washington Way was originally designed to accommodate 90,000 vehicles per day of local traffic. By July 1998, however, traffic had risen to 120,000 vehicles per day. The highway was the most crash-prone mile of urban freeway in Ohio, due to high traffic volumes and the system of 14 interwoven entrance and exit ramps, many of them on the left.

From July 6, 1998, to August 18, 2000, the Fort Washington Way 2000 project completely rebuilt the highway with a more compact configuration, eliminating most ramps. Second Street (the former Pete Rose Way) was reconfigured, and the Riverfront Transit Center was eventually built beside the freeway trench. Albert Sabin Park at Third and Elm streets was demolished. Together, these changes freed up more than 14 acres (5.7 ha) for redevelopment. Within a few years of Fort Washington Way's reconstruction, Hamilton County would use this newly available space to replace Riverfront Stadium with Great American Ball Park and Paul Brown Stadium and begin redeveloping the central riverfront as The Banks. At the last minute, Cincinnati city officials decided to drive pilings into the ground that would someday allow the highway's central portion to be covered with a highway deck that would link the riverfront with the central business district for the first time in decades. A redundant water main was also installed so that the water main running through the abandoned Cincinnati Subway could easily be removed to make room for a subway line.

The Fort Washington Way 2000 project was originally estimated at $96 million but eventually cost $314 million. The project finished on time and under budget. It required 1.5 million hours of labor, more than 84 miles (135 km) of steel, and nearly 175,000 short tons (156,000 long tons; 159,000 t) of concrete. The Ohio-Kentucky-Indiana Regional Council of Governments initiated the project's design phase, while the City of Cincinnati led construction efforts. The project was funded by multiple federal, state, and local agencies, including the Kentucky Transportation Cabinet. Additional funding came from a bond fund that was used to complete Ronald Reagan Cross County Highway.

== Future ==
Pilings driven into the central median of Fort Washington Way would support a four-block-long highway deck, with buildings up to four stories tall on three of the blocks. Hamilton County commissioners have explored using the Transportation Investment Generating Economic Recovery program to pay for a deck over the first block, then tax increment financing to pay for successive blocks using development revenue, culminating in a park on the fourth block. In 2018, covering Fort Washington Way and several blocks of parking lots to the south, totaling 15 acres (6.1 ha), was estimated to cost from $180 million to $200 million. The highway deck was included in Cincinnati and Hamilton County's unsuccessful 2018 bid to attract Amazon HQ2 to The Banks. In 2019, graduate-level students around the world competed to create a comprehensive design and development plan for the highway deck in the Urban Land Institute's annual Hines Student Competition.

== Safety ==
Traffic volume on Fort Washington Way
Traffic section	Volume
Traffic section	2013
Central Avenue to Broadway Street	111,290
I-71 to Lytle Tunnel	57,495
US 50 (Third Street Viaduct)	50,220
Volume: Average 24-hour traffic volume; Source: Ohio Department of Transportation

The speed limit is 55 miles per hour (90 km/h) throughout Fort Washington Way; however, there is a 40-mile-per-hour (65 km/h) advisory speed limit at the eastern end, where I-71 curves sharply to enter the Lytle Tunnel. In the 20 months after the highway reopened in 2000, Fort Washington Way had 22 truck accidents at this curve, which had been tightened to eight degrees. According to ARTIMIS estimates, the accidents caused over 97 hours of delays, costing about $181,686.

In response to the rash of rollovers, the sharp turn before the Lytle Tunnel features several special safety measures. In May 2003, the Ohio Department of Transportation (ODOT) installed radar speed signs to alert drivers to the advisory speed limit. Rumble strips and 12-by-14-foot (3.7 by 4.3 m) caution signs have also been installed along the banked turn. Since late 2002, a CB Wizard Alert System has broadcast an advisory in a loop on CB channel 19 (27.185 MHz), the most commonly used commercial trucking frequency: "This is ODOT, southbound 71 traffic be aware of a sharp turn exiting the tunnel one mile ahead. Reduce speed to 40 mph NOW!" The message is heard up to 1 mile (1.6 km) north of the tunnel. A similar message is in place for northbound truckers. ODOT has also considered mounting traffic enforcement cameras to monitor causes of truck rollovers.

== Exit list ==
The entire route is in Cincinnati, Hamilton County.

mi	km	Exit	Destinations	Notes
0.22– 0.50	0.35– 0.80	1A	I-71 south / I-75 south (Brent Spence Bridge) I-75 north (Mill Creek Expressway) / US 50 west	Western end of I-71 / US 50 concurrency; mileposts reflect I-71 state log mileage from the Kentucky state line
		1B	Third Street – Downtown Cincinnati, Riverfront	Westbound only: exit before Lytle Tunnel, entrance from between Race and Elm streets; access to Taylor–Southgate Bridge (US 27) via Broadway Street, Roebling Suspension Bridge (KY 17) via Vine and Rosa Parks streets, Clay Wade Bailey Bridge (US 25 / US 42 / US 127)
0.42– 1.34	0.68– 2.16	1B	Second Street – Downtown Cincinnati, Riverfront	Eastbound only: exit before Central Avenue underpass, entrance just before Lytle Tunnel; access to Roebling Suspension Bridge (KY 17) via Rosa Parks Street, Taylor–Southgate Bridge (US 27) via East Pete Rose Way
1.11	1.79	1C	I-71 north – Columbus US 50 east (Columbia Parkway) to I-471 / US 52	Eastern end of I-71 / US 50 concurrency; left-hand eastbound exit to US 50
1.000 mi = 1.609 km; 1.000 km = 0.621 mi: Concurrency terminus; Incomplete access

=== Pre-1998 exit list ===
The entire route was in Cincinnati, Hamilton County.

mi	km	Exit	Destinations	Notes
0.2– 0.5	0.32– 0.80	1A	I-71 south / I-75 south (Brent Spence Bridge) I-75 north (Mill Creek Expressway) / US 50 west	Western end of I-71 / US 50 concurrency
0.4– 0.5	0.64– 0.80	1B	US 42 (Elm Street), Third Street	Westbound exit only
0.4– 0.6	0.64– 0.97	1B	US 27 (Pete Rose Way)	Eastbound exit only; access to Riverfront Stadium
0.4– 0.8	0.64– 1.3	1C	Vine Street, KY 17 (Roebling Suspension Bridge) – Covington, Kentucky	Eastbound and westbound (left side) exits only; westbound access to Riverfront Stadium
0.5– 0.7	0.80– 1.1		Race Street	Eastbound entrance only (from the left)
0.5– 0.8	0.80– 1.3		Walnut Street	Eastbound and westbound entrances only (both from the left); westbound access from Roebling Suspension Bridge and Riverfront Stadium
0.5– 0.9	0.80– 1.4	1D	Main Street	Eastbound exit and entrance (from the left) only; eastbound access from Pete Rose Way and Roebling Suspension Bridge
0.7– 1.0	1.1– 1.6		KY 17 (Roebling Suspension Bridge), Walnut Street	Eastbound entrance only
0.8– 0.9	1.3– 1.4		Third Street, Sycamore Street	Westbound entrance only
0.9– 1.1	1.4– 1.8	1J	I-71 north – Columbus US 50 east (Columbia Parkway) to US 52 / I-471 – Newport, Kentucky	Eastern end of I-71 / US 50 concurrency; access to I-471 south via exit 1K
1.000 mi = 1.609 km; 1.000 km = 0.621 mi: Concurrency terminus; Incomplete access

== See also ==
- Roads in Cincinnati
