= 61st Ohio Infantry Regiment =

- Active: April 23, 1862, to March 31, 1865
- Country: United States
- Allegiance: Union
- Branch: Union Army
- Type: Infantry
- Engagements: Battle of Groveton; Second Battle of Bull Run; Battle of Chancellorsville; Gettysburg campaign; Battle of Gettysburg; Battle of Wauhatchie; Atlanta campaign; Battle of Resaca; Battle of Dallas; Battle of New Hope Church; Battle of Allatoona; Battle of Kennesaw Mountain; Battle of Peachtree Creek; Siege of Atlanta; Sherman's March to the Sea; Carolinas campaign; Battle of Bentonville

The 61st Ohio Infantry Regiment was an infantry regiment in the Union Army during the American Civil War.

== Service ==
The 61st Ohio Infantry Regiment was organized at Camp Chase in Columbus, Ohio and mustered in for three years service on April 23, 1862, under the command of Colonel Newton Schleich.

The regiment was attached to 1st Brigade, 3rd Division, I Corps, Army of Virginia, June to September 1862. 1st Brigade, 3rd Division, XI Corps, Army of the Potomac, to October 1862. 2nd Brigade, 2nd Division, XI Corps, to November 1862. 1st Brigade, 3rd Division, XI Corps, Army of the Potomac, to October 1863. Army of the Cumberland to April 1864. 3rd Brigade, 1st Division, XX Corps, Army of the Cumberland, to March 1865.

The 61st Ohio Infantry ceased to exist on March 31, 1865, when it was consolidated with the 82nd Ohio Infantry.

== Detailed service ==
Ordered to western Virginia May 27, and joined Fremont's army at Strasburg, Va., June 23, 1862. March to Sperryville and duty there until August 8, 1862. Pope's Campaign in northern Virginia August 16-September 2. Freeman's Ford August 22. Sulphur Springs August 23–24. Battles of Groveton August 29, and Bull Run August 30. Duty in the defenses of Washington, D.C., until December. March to Fredericksburg, Va., December 10–15. "Mud March" January 20–24, 1863. Duty at Stafford Court House until April 27. Chancellorsville Campaign April 27-May 6. Battle of Chancellorsville May 1–5. Gettysburg Campaign June 11-July 24. Battle of Gettysburg, July 1–3. Pursuit of Lee to Manassas Gap, Va., July 5–24. Duty along Orange & Alexandria Railroad July 26 to September 26. Movement to Bridgeport, Ala., September 26-October 3. Reopening Tennessee River October 26–29. Battle of Wauhatchie, Tenn., October 28–29. Chattanooga-Ringgold Campaign November 23–27. Orchard Knob November 23. Mission Lodge November 24–25. March to relief of Knoxville, Tenn., November 28-December 8. Moved to Bridgeport, Ala., and duty there until March 1864. Veterans on furlough March and April. Atlanta Campaign May 1-September 8. Demonstration on Rocky Faced Ridge May 8–11. Battle of Resaca May 14–15. Cassville May 19. New Hope Church May 25. Battles about Dallas, New Hope Church, and Allatoona Hills, May 25-June 5. Lost Mountain June 8. Operations about Marietta and against Kennesaw Mountain June 10-July 2. Pine Hill June 11–14. Lost Mountain June 15–17. Gilgal, or Golgotha Church, June 15. Muddy Creek June 17. Noyes' Creek June 19. Kolb's Farm June 22. Assault on Kennesaw June 27. Ruff's Station July 4. Chattahoochie River June 5–17. Peachtree Creek July 19–20. Siege of Atlanta July 22-August 25. Operations at Chattahoochie River Bridge May 26-September 2. Occupation of Atlanta September 2-November 15. Expedition from Atlanta to Tuckum's Cross Roads October 26–29. March to the sea November 15-December 10. Montieth Swamp December 9. Siege of Savannah December 10–21. Campaign of the Carolinas January to March 1865. Taylor's Hole Creek, Averysboro, N.C., March 16. Battle of Bentonville March 19–21. Occupation of Goldsboro March 24.

== Casualties ==
The regiment lost a total of 165 men during service; 7 officers and 68 enlisted men killed or mortally wounded, 90 enlisted men died of disease.

== Commanders ==
- Colonel Newton Schleich
- Colonel Stephen J. McGroarty - commanded at the second battle of Bull Run as lieutenant colonel

== See also ==
- 82nd Ohio Infantry
- List of Ohio Civil War units
- Ohio in the Civil War
- Second Battle of Bull Run
- Battle of Chancellorsville
- Gettysburg campaign
- Battle of Wauhatchie
- Atlanta campaign
- Sherman's March to the Sea
- Carolinas campaign
