= Gerber Life Insurance Company =

American insurance company

- Type: Subsidiary
- Industry: Life insurance
- Founded: 1967; 59 years ago Fremont, Michigan, U.S.
- Headquarters: White Plains, New York, U.S.
- Key people: Keith O'Reilly (CEO)
- Number of employees: 500
- Parent: Western & Southern Financial Group
- Website: www.gerberlife.com

The Gerber Life Insurance Company (also known as Gerber Life Insurance or Gerber Life) is a life insurance company that was formed in 1967 in Fremont, Michigan. Gerber Life provides juvenile and family life insurance products to middle-income families along with medical insurance to small- and medium-sized businesses. It is currently owned by Western & Southern Financial Group, who licenses the Gerber trademark from the Gerber Products Company unit of Nestlé.

== History ==
Gerber Life is headquartered in White Plains, New York, and has an operation center in Fremont, Michigan. The company has $52 billion of life insurance in force with 3.6 million policies for individuals throughout the United States, Puerto Rico, and Canada.

In 2007, Nestlé acquired the company with Gerber Products. On September 17, 2018, Nestlé announced that it would be selling the Gerber Life Insurance Company to Western & Southern Financial Group for $1.55 billion cash.

== Products ==
- Whole Life Plan
- Family Life Insurance Plan
- Accident Protection Insurance
- Gerber Life College Plan
