= Anna Louise Inn =

Women's facility in Cincinnati, Ohio

Coordinates: 39°06′04″N 84°30′12″W

The Anna Louise Inn is a women's facility in Cincinnati, Ohio, providing affordable housing and supportive services to economically vulnerable single women, supporting them to reach greater self-sufficiency. It is operated by HER Cincinnati, formerly, Cincinnati Union Bethel (CUB), a charitable group founded in 1830.

Since 1909, the Anna Louise Inn has provided safe and affordable housing for single women. It offers its residents a positive and supportive community to enable their success. The majority of residents have complex and long-term health conditions (such as mental illness, drug abuse, physical disabilities, or other medical conditions),

With 85 single-occupancy apartments, each unit features a full kitchen, bedroom, furniture and bathroom.

== History ==
The Anna Louise Inn was established in the spring of 1909, as a home for working young women. The Charles P. Taft family were the principal benefactors of the institution, which stood across the street from their home (now the Taft Museum of Art). They named the Anna Louise Inn after their daughter.

The present location of the home is 2401 Reading Rd. in Mount Auburn, Cincinnati. For over a century, Anna Louise Inn was located at downtown Cincinnati, within the Lytle Park Historic District.

The new Anna Louise Inn in Mount Auburn, with 85 units, opened its doors in 2015.
