= 10th Ohio Infantry Regiment =

- Active: May 7, 1861, to August 21, 1861 (3 months); June 3, 1861, to June 3, 1864 (3 years)
- Country: United States
- Allegiance: Union
- Branch: Infantry
- Engagements: Battle of Carnifex Ferry; Battle of Perryville; Battle of Stones River; Tullahoma Campaign; Battle of Chickamauga; Siege of Chattanooga; Battle of Lookout Mountain; Battle of Missionary Ridge; Atlanta campaign Battle of Resaca

The 10th Ohio Infantry Regiment was an infantry regiment in the Union Army during the American Civil War. The regiment was also known as the Montgomery Regiment, and the Bloody Tenth. The 10th Ohio Infantry was predominantly recruited from Irish Americans, but had two companies consisting of German Americans.

== Service ==
=== Three-month regiment ===
The 10th Ohio Infantry Regiment was organized at Camp Harrison near Cincinnati, Ohio, and assembled for three months' service on May 7, 1861, under Colonel William Haines Lytle. This was in response to President Lincoln's call for 75,000 volunteers. The regiment moved to Camp Dennison on May 12 and performed duty there until June 3, 1861. The 10th Ohio Infantry discharged on August 21, 1861.

=== Three-years regiment ===
The 10th Ohio Infantry was reorganized at Camp Dennison on June 3, 1861, and assembled for three years of service under the command of Colonel William Haines Lytle.

Through September 1861, the regiment was attached to the 2nd Brigade, Army of Occupation, Western Virginia. It was subsequently assigned to Benham's Brigade, Kanawha Division, Western Virginia, and stayed there through October 1861; the 1st Brigade, Kanawha Division, Western Virginia, to November 1861; the 17th Brigade, Army of the Ohio, to December 1861; the 17th Brigade, 3rd Division, Army of the Ohio, to September 1862; the 17th Brigade, 3rd Division, I Corps, Army of the Ohio, to November 1862; the 2nd Brigade, 1st Division, Center, XIV Corps, Army of the Cumberland, to January 1863; the 2nd Brigade, 1st Division, XIV Corps, January 1863; and Headquarters Provost Guard, Department of the Cumberland, to May 1864.

The 10th Ohio Infantry disassembled on June 3, 1864. Seventy-five enlisted men whose terms of enlistment had not expired were left unassigned within the Army of the Cumberland until September, then were assigned to the 18th Ohio Infantry.

== Detailed service ==
=== 1861 ===
Operations by the 10th Ohio Regiment began quickly. After working up in Ohio, it marched to western Virginia on June 24. Operations ensued in Grafton, Clarksburg and Buckhannon until August. After that, it served in the Western Virginia Campaign from July to September 1861, seeing action at the Battle of Carnifex Ferry on September 10.

After some rest, the 10th moved to the Kanawha Valley and New River Region, where it saw action from October 19 to November 24. It participated in the pursuit of Confederate Brig. Gen. John B. Floyd from November 10 to 15 after reaching Gauley Bridge on November 10. It was at Cotton Mountain from November 10 to 11.

After that, the division moved to Louisville, Kentucky, where it was in action from November 24 to December 2. From there, the 10th moved to Elizabethtown and then on to Bacon Creek on December 26, where it waited out the winter.

=== 1862 ===
The 10th began the year on station at Bacon Creek. It stayed there until February 1862. It marched to Bowling Green, Kentucky, on February 10–15, and occupied Bowling Green from February 15 to 22.

After that, the division was ordered to advance on Nashville, Tennessee, which it did on February 22 – March 2. After a brief rest, it participated in the advance on Murfreesboro, Tennessee, from March 17 to 19. From there, it occupied Shelbyville, Fayetteville, and then advanced on Huntsville, Alabama, from March 28 to April 11. This resulted in the capture of Huntsville on April 11.

The division saw no rest, immediately marching on Decatur from April 11 to 14. It saw action at West Bridge, near Bridgeport, on April 29. After that, the division had a breather. It was stationed at Huntsville until August.

The division then participated in the march to Louisville, Kentucky, in pursuit of Confederate General Braxton Bragg from August 27 to September 26. This turned into a pursuit of Bragg into Kentucky from October 1 to 15. The division saw action at the Battle of Perryville on October eighth.

There followed a march to Nashville from October 16 to November 7. It then was assigned to Provost duty at the headquarters of General William S. Rosecrans, Commanding Army of the Cumberland, which occupied the division for the remainder of the year.

While serving General Rosecrans, the division participated in the advance on Murfreesboro, Tennessee, from December 26 to 30, 1862. It saw action at the Battle of Stones River, December 30–31, 1862 and January 1 to 3, 1863, including Stewart's Creek, January 1, 1863.

=== 1863 ===
The 10th remained on Provost Duty for almost all of 1863. In December, it was transferred to similar duty at the headquarters of General George H. Thomas, Commanding Army and Department of the Cumberland.

The division saw duty at Murfreesboro until June 1863. It then participated in the Tullahoma Campaign from June 23 to July 7, 1863. It was one of the divisions participating in the occupation of middle Tennessee until August 16.

The division then marched over the Cumberland Mountains and Tennessee River as part of the preliminaries to the Chickamauga Campaign, where it formed part of the line from August 16 to September 22, 1863. It was in the line for the Battle of Chickamauga, September 19 to 21. After that, it participated in the siege of Chattanooga, September 24 – November 23, 1863. It was at the battle of Chattanooga, November 23–25, and then at Missionary Ridge, November 24–25, 1863.

=== 1864 ===
The 10th continued performing its Provost duty for General Thomas until May 1864.

During this time, it participated in the reconnaissance of Dalton, Georgia, from February 22 to 27, 1864. There followed the Atlanta campaign led by General William Tecumseh Sherman, May 1–27. The 10th made a demonstration attack on Rocky Faced Ridge from May 8 to 11. After the Battle of Resaca, May 14–15, the division was ordered to the rear for muster out on May 27, 1864.

== Casualties ==
The regiment lost a total of 168 men during its service; three officers and 86 enlisted men were killed or mortally wounded, two officers and 77 enlisted men died of disease.

== Commanders ==
- Colonel William Haines Lytle
- Lieutenant Colonel Joseph W. Burke – commanded at the battles of Perryville and Stones River
- Lieutenant Colonel William M. Ward – commanded at the Battle of Chickamauga

== Notable members ==
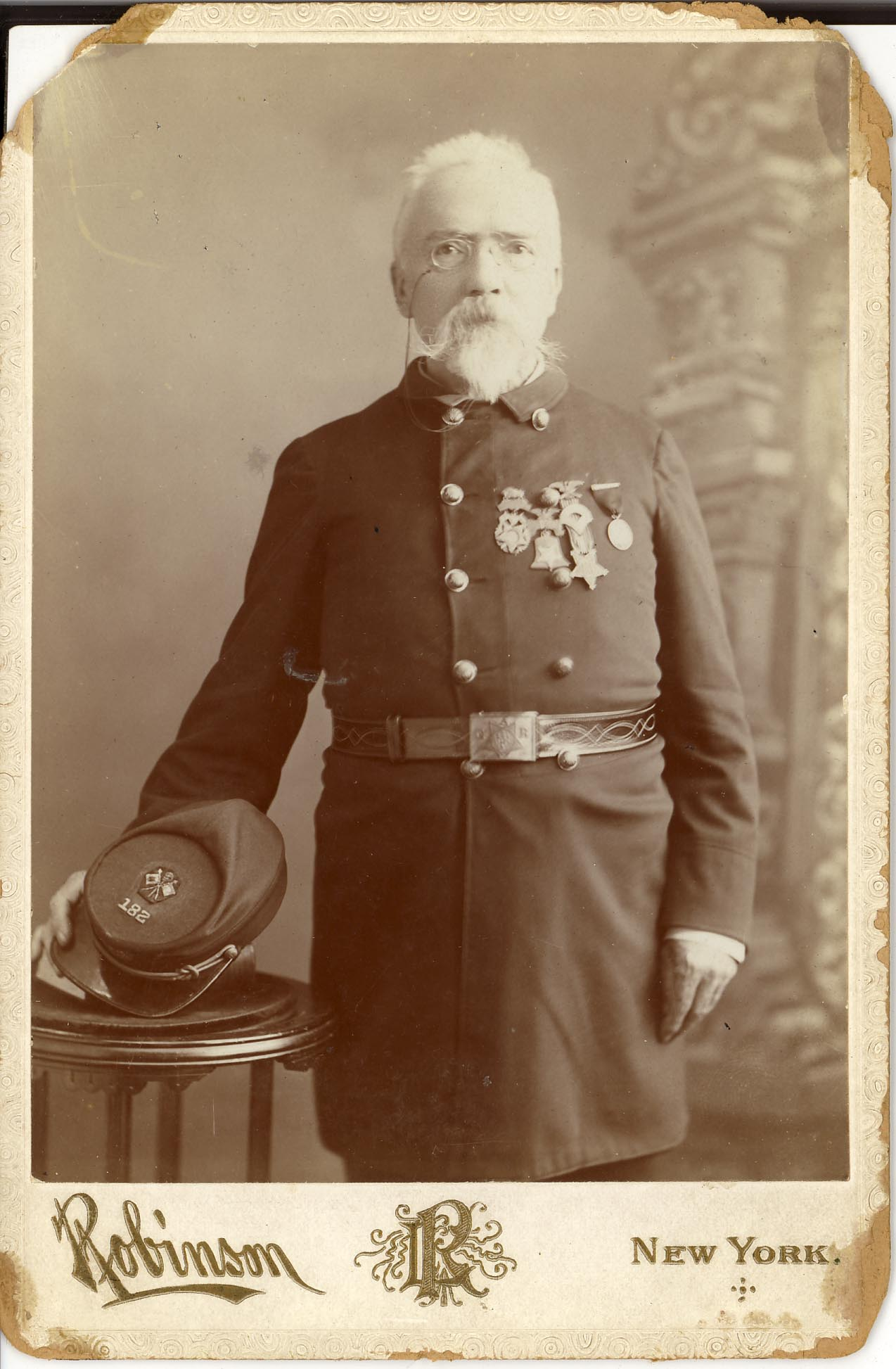
Thomas J. Kelly

- Thomas J. Kelly: First Sergeant, Company C (1861–1862); Captain, Chief Signal Officer, Company I (1863–1864); Chief Organizer (1867–1869), Colonel, Committee Secretary (1871–), Irish Republican Brotherhood
- Stephen Joseph McGroarty, Irish American soldier
- Rev. William T. O'Higgins (1829–1874), Catholic chaplain

== See also ==
- List of Ohio Civil War units
- Ohio in the Civil War
