= Western & Southern Financial Group =

American financial services and life insurance company

- Type: Mutual
- Genre: Financial Services
- Founded: 1888; 138 years ago as Western and Southern Life Insurance
- Headquarters: Cincinnati, Ohio, U.S.
- Key people: John F. Barrett (CEO)
- Products: Insurance, Annuities, Mutual Funds
- Revenue: $7.2 billion (2023)
- Operating income: 651.3 million United States dollar (2023)
- Total assets: $75.1 billion (2023)
- Number of employees: 3,400 (2023)
- Subsidiaries: The Western and Southern Life Insurance Company, Western-Southern Life Assurance Company, Columbus Life Insurance Company, Eagle Realty Group LLC, Fabric by Gerber Life, Fort Washington Investment Advisors, Gerber Life Agency, Gerber Life Insurance Company, Integrity Life Insurance Company, National Integrity Life Insurance Company, The Lafayette Life Insurance Company, Touchstone Investments, W&S Brokerage Services, W&S Financial Group Distributors
- Website: www.westernsouthern.com

Western & Southern Financial Group, also commonly referred to as Western & Southern, is the Cincinnati, Ohio-based parent company of a diversified group of financial services subsidiaries. Through its subsidiaries, Western & Southern offers a variety of financial services such as life insurance, annuities, mutual funds, retirement planning and investment management.

Western & Southern subsidiaries include Western & Southern Life Insurance Co, Western-Southern Life Assurance Co, Columbus Life Insurance Co, Gerber Life Insurance Company, Integrity Life Insurance Co, National Integrity Life Insurance Co, Lafayette Life Insurance Co, IFS Financial Services, Fort Washington Investment Advisors, Touchstone Investments, Eagle Realty Group, Fabric by Gerber Life and W&S Financial Group Distributors. Its subsidiaries held over $112.2 billion in assets owned and managed as of 2023.

Western & Southern is a Fortune 500 company at No. 284. As of June 2024, it held a "AA- Very Strong" rating from Standard & Poor's, a "A+ Superior" from A.M. Best, a "AA Very Strong" from Fitch, a "Aa3 Excellent" from Moody's, and a "96 out of 100" Comdex ranking.

== History ==
Western & Southern dates back to the founding of The Western and Southern Life Insurance Company in 1888.

Western & Southern played a key role in the development of the Great American Tower at Queen City Square project in downtown Cincinnati, Ohio. The city’s tallest office tower was completed in 2011.

In May 2013, Western & Southern signed a controversial agreement with Cincinnati Union Bethel to purchase the historic Anna Louise Inn in downtown Cincinnati. In 2014, Western & Southern Financial Group, owner of many properties within the Lytle Park Historic District asked the city to remove the historic status of several historic buildings. The company hopes to remove sections of the district in order to build new office space.

In 2018, Western & Southern acquired the Gerber Life Insurance Company from Nestle for $1.55 billion, along with a long-term intellectual property license in connection with financial services.

In November 2019, Western & Southern Financial Group promoted John Bultema as CEO of Lafayette Life Insurance Co.

On 9 March 2020, Legacy Marketing Group formed a strategic partnership with Western & Southern Financial Group to create and sell Western & Southern subsidiary Integrity Life Insurance Company's proprietary fixed indexed annuity products.

In 2022, Western & Southern acquired Fabric Technologies and later renamed it Fabric by Gerber Life.

A study released in March 2023 by the University of Cincinnati Economic Center showed that Western & Southern supported 188,715 jobs, $13.6 billion in earnings and a total economic output of $27.4 billion.

== Sponsorship ==
From 2002 to 2023, Western & Southern served as title sponsor of the annual Cincinnati Open tennis tournament, then known as the Western & Southern Open. In 2024, Beemok Capital, who acquired the tournament in 2022, renamed it the Cincinnati Open.

In 2015, Western & Southern became the title sponsor of the annual WEBN fireworks show that takes place along the Ohio River as part of Riverfest over Labor Day weekend each year.

== See also ==
- List of United States insurance companies
