= Guilford School building =

Building in Cincinnati, Ohio, United States

Coordinates: 39°06′03″N 84°30′18″W

Guilford School is a historic former schoolhouse, now housing commercial offices, on the east side of Downtown Cincinnati at 421 E 4th Street. The building is adjacent to Lytle Park is a contributing property to the Lytle Park Historic District.

Guilford School was dedicated May 16, 1914, and named for Nathan Guilford (1786–1854), an early advocate for Ohio education. The building stands on the site of Fort Washington and later also the boardinghouse where Stephen Foster, then a steamboat worker, stayed from 1846 to 1850. It was designed by Frederick W. Garber.

It is now owned by Western & Southern Life Insurance.
