= William Haines Lytle =

American politician (1826–1863)

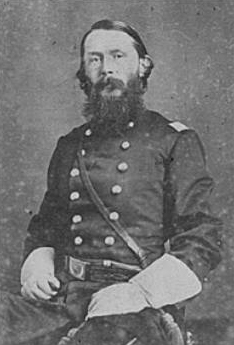
- Born: November 2, 1826; Cincinnati, Ohio
- Died: September 20, 1863 (aged 36); Chickamauga, Georgia
- Burial place: Spring Grove Cemetery, Cincinnati, Ohio
- Military career
- Allegiance: United States of America; Union
- Branch: United States Army; Union Army
- Service years: 1846–1848; 1861–1863
- Rank: Brigadier General
- Commands: 10th Ohio Infantry
- Conflicts: Mexican–American War; American Civil War

William Haines Lytle (November 2, 1826 – September 20, 1863) was a politician in Ohio, poet, and military officer in the United States Army during both the Mexican–American War and American Civil War, killed in action as a brigadier general.

== Biography ==
William Haines Lytle was born in Cincinnati, Ohio, the scion of the affluent Lytle family. He graduated from Cincinnati College and studied law. After passing the bar exam, he established a law firm in Cincinnati, but soon enlisted in the 2nd Ohio Volunteer Infantry and served as a captain in the Mexican–American War. After returning from Mexico, Lytle resumed and expanded his legal practice. He was elected to the Ohio state legislature as a Democrat. He unsuccessfully ran for Lieutenant Governor in 1857, losing the election by just a few hundred votes. He was a celebrated American poet before the Civil War. Lytle's most famous poem, "Antony and Cleopatra" (published in 1857), was beloved by both North and South in antebellum America. Lytle was appointed as a major general in the Ohio state militia. In 1860, he unsuccessfully sought the Democratic nomination for his district's seat in the United States House of Representatives. He campaigned in Ohio for the candidacy of Stephen A. Douglas in the 1860 Presidential Election.

When the Civil War erupted in 1861, through his political and military connections, Lytle was commissioned as colonel of the 10th Ohio Infantry. He and his brigade were assigned to western Virginia (now West Virginia), where they engaged in a series of small engagements in a campaign that led to the withdrawal of Confederate forces in that region, helping pave the way for statehood. Lytle was given command of a brigade of infantry. He was severely wounded in his left calf muscle in a fight at Carnifex Ferry on September 10, 1861, and was sent home to recover. After a four-month recuperation, Lytle was assigned commander of the Bardstown, Kentucky military training camp. Returning to field duty, he led a brigade in Maj. Gen. Ormsby M. Mitchel's division. He participated in Mitchel's operations along the Memphis and Chattanooga Railroad. Lytle was again wounded and taken prisoner at the Battle of Perryville in Kentucky on October 8, 1862. He was soon exchanged and rejoined the army. On November 29, Lytle was promoted to brigadier general of volunteers, and led his brigade in numerous engagements in the army of William S. Rosecrans. Admiring officers from his old 10th OVI presented him with a jeweled Maltese cross in September 1863, just eleven days before his death.

Lytle was mortally wounded at the Battle of Chickamauga in Georgia while leading a counterattack on horseback. Once his identity was known, Confederates placed a guard around his body, and many recited his poetry over their evening campfires. The hill where he died is now known as "Lytle Hill" in the Chickamauga National Military Park.

His funeral was held in the early afternoon at Christ Church on Fourth Street in Cincinnati. So many people lined the streets that the funeral cortege did not reach Spring Grove Cemetery until dusk. Lytle's monument, one of the most impressive ones there, is near the entrance to the cemetery.

== Legacy ==
Lytle never married, and left no direct descendants.

Fort Vinegar, on Vinegar Hill in Bowling Green, was renamed as Fort Lytle after Lytle's death. It is now on the National Register of Historic Places in Warren County, Kentucky.

Lytle Park in Cincinnati, One Lytle Place in Cincinnati, and Lytle Street at 1235 west in Chicago, are named for the fallen general or his family.

== Anthology ==
- Lytle, William Haines (1894). Venable, William H. (ed.). Poems of William Haines Lytle. Cincinnati: The Robert Clarke Company.

== Antony and Cleopatra ==
Lytle's most famous poem, 1858:

I am dying, Egypt, dying!
Ebbs the crimson life-tide fast,
And the dark Plutonian shadows
Gather on the evening blast;
Let thine arm, oh Queen, enfold me,
Hush thy sobs and bow thine ear,
Listen to the great heart secrets
Thou, and thou alone, must hear.

Though my scarred and veteran legions
Bear their eagles high no more,
And my wrecked and scattered galleys
Strew dark Actium's fatal shore;
Though no glittering guards surround me,
Prompt to do their master's will,
I must perish like a Roman,
Die the great Triumvir still.

Let not Caesar's servile minions,
Mock the lion thus laid low;
'Twas no foeman's arm that felled him,
'Twas his own that struck the blow —
His who, pillowed on thy bosom,
Turned aside from glory's ray —
His who, drunk with thy caresses,
Madly threw a world away.

Should the base plebeian rabble
Dare assail my name at Rome,
Where the noble spouse, Octavia,
Weeps within her widowed home,
Seek her; say the gods bear witness, —
Altars, augurs, circling wings, —
That her blood, with mine commingled,
Yet shall mount the thrones of kings.

And for thee, star-eyed Egyptian —
Glorious sorceress of the Nile!
Light the path to Stygian horrors
With the splendors of thy smile;
Give the Caesar crowns and arches,
Let his brow the laurel twine,
I can scorn the senate's triumphs,
Triumphing in love like thine.

I am dying, Egypt, dying;
Hark! the insulting foeman's cry;
They are coming; quick, my falchion!
Let me front them ere I die.
Ah, no more amid the battle
Shall my heart exulting swell;
Isis and Osiris guard thee, —
Cleopatra, Rome, farewell!

== See also ==
- List of American Civil War generals (Union)
