= Ladislas Segoe =

American urban planner

Ladislas Segoe (1894–1983) was a pioneer in urban planning. An immigrant from Austria-Hungary to the United States, he worked with Alfred Bettman on the City Plan for Cincinnati.
