= Downtown Cincinnati =

Coordinates: 39°6′N 84°31′W

Downtown
- Neighborhood
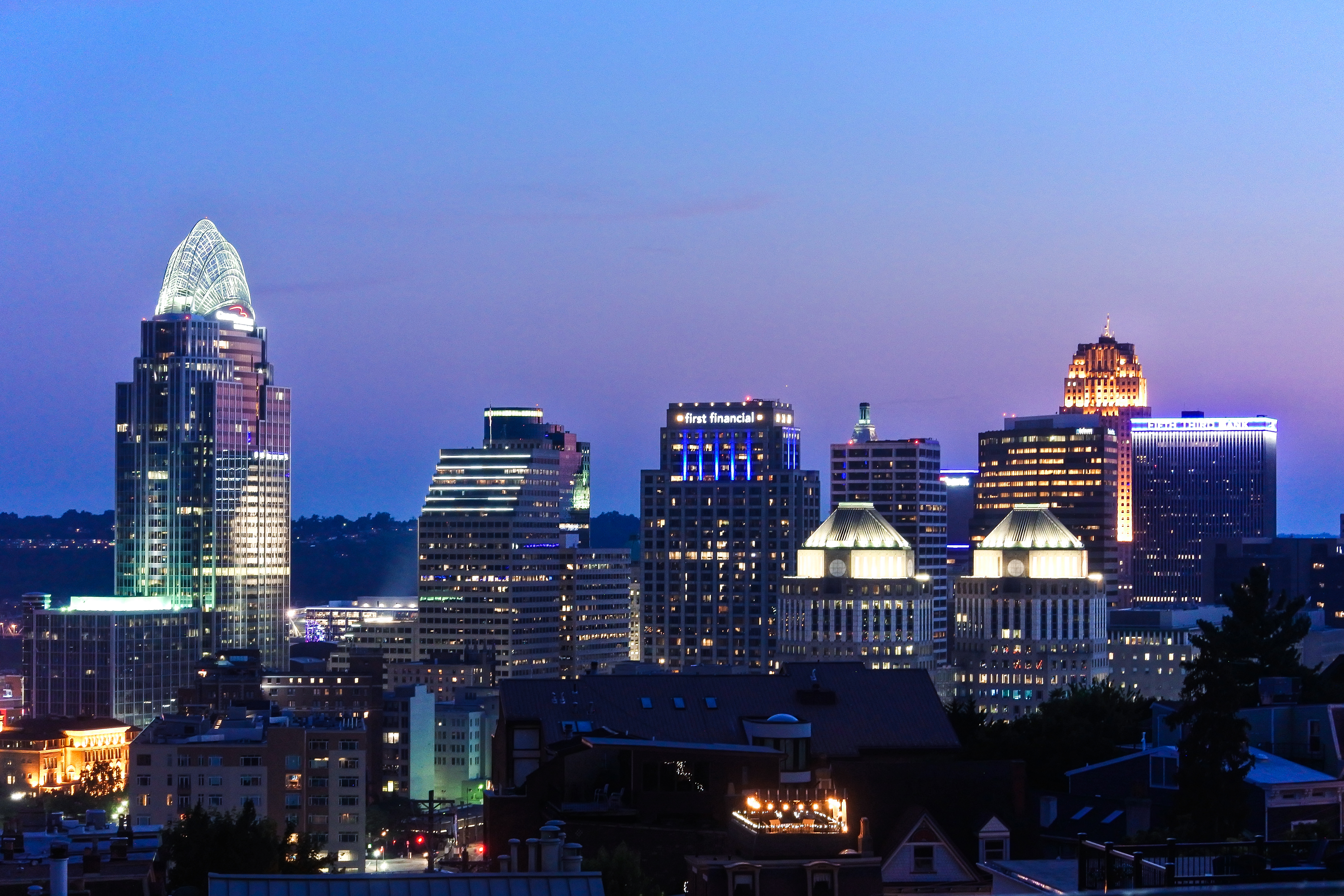
- Downtown Cincinnati viewed from Mt. Adams

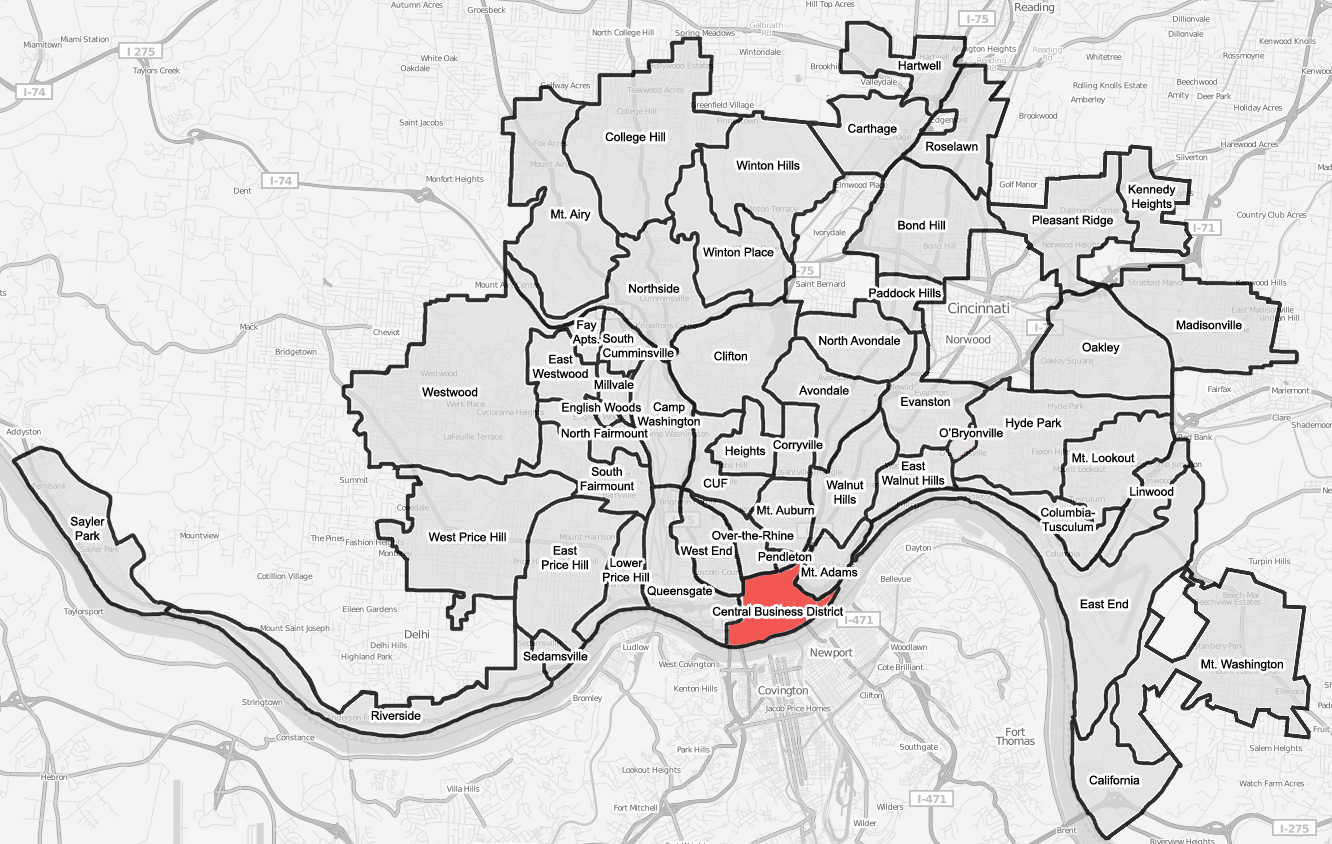
- Location within Cincinnati
- Country: United States
- State: Ohio
- City: Cincinnati

Area
  - Total: 0.975 sq mi (2.53 km^{2})
- Elevation: 659 ft (201 m)

Population (2020)
  - Total: 5,835
  - Density: 5,984.6/sq mi (2,310.7/km^{2})
- Time zone: UTC-5 (EST)
  - Summer (DST): UTC-4 (EDT)
- ZIP code: 45202
- Website: Downtown Cincinnati

Downtown Cincinnati is one of the 52 neighborhoods of Cincinnati, Ohio. It is the central business district of the city, as well as the economic and symbiotic center of the Cincinnati metropolitan area. Originally the densely populated core of the city, the neighborhood was transformed into a commercial zone in the mid-20th century. The population was 5,835 at the 2020 census.

== History ==
Downtown Cincinnati developed from its founding in 1788 into a major 19th‑century commercial and industrial center, supported by steamboat traffic, meatpacking, and manufacturing along the Ohio River. By the late 1800s the basin was among the most densely populated urban areas in the United States, with growth constrained by the surrounding hills until the introduction of incline railways. The district also became the city’s civic and cultural hub, with significant commercial architecture and public institutions concentrated downtown. Mid‑20th‑century urban renewal programs and highway construction removed large portions of the historic built environment and reduced the residential population, reshaping the area into a primarily commercial core.

Downtown Cincinnati is an increasingly residential area with former commercial space, such as Park Place at Lytle, being converted into luxury condos.

== Geography ==
Downtown Cincinnati is laid out on a basin on the Ohio River, surrounded by steep hills. Downtown Cincinnati's streets are arranged on a grid. Streets are split between the east and west by Vine Street. Bridges from Downtown Cincinnati span the Ohio River across to Covington and Newport in Northern Kentucky.

The city government defines the neighborhood's northern boundary with Over-the-Rhine and Pendleton as East Central Parkway, the northwestern boundary with West End as Plum Street, the western boundary with Queensgate as Interstate 75, and the eastern boundary with Mount Adams as Eggleston Avenue.

== Demographics ==
Downtown Cincinnati Population 1840-2020
Year	Pop.	±%
1840	36,946	—
1850	38,970	+5.5%
1860	53,752	+37.9%
1870	51,393	−4.4%
1880	42,820	−16.7%
1890	36,076	−15.7%
1900	24,800	−31.3%
1910	20,050	−19.2%
1920	15,475	−22.8%
1930	12,443	−19.6%
1940	11,497	−7.6%
1950	12,126	+5.5%
1960	5,953	−50.9%
1970	3,472	−41.7%
1980	2,528	−27.2%
1990	3,846	+52.1%
2000	3,189	−17.1%
2010	4,850	+52.1%
2020	5,835	+20.3%
Wards were utilized from 1840-1890 which have slightly different boundaries from census tracts utilized from 1900-40.

As of the census of 2020, there were 5,835 people living in the neighborhood. There were 4,147 housing units. The racial makeup of the neighborhood was 68.0% White, 17.9% Black or African American, 0.1% Native American, 6.4% Asian, 0.1% Pacific Islander, 1.7% from some other race, and 5.7% from two or more races. Hispanic or Latino of any race were 4.7% of the population.

There were 2,639 households, out of which 17.2% were families. 64.4% of all households were made up of individuals.

2.7% of the neighborhood's population were under the age of 18, 92.0% were 18 to 64, and 5.3% were 65 years of age or older. 37.6% of the population were male and 62.4% were female.

According to the U.S. Census American Community Survey, for the period 2016-2020 the estimated median annual income for a household in the neighborhood was $90,027. About 4.2% of family households were living below the poverty line. About 68.1% had a bachelor's degree or higher.

== Economy ==
Downtown Cincinnati has long served as the city’s primary economic center. In the mid‑nineteenth century, 16 of Cincinnati’s 24 banks were located along Third Street near the Public Landing, then the hub of river commerce, and by the late nineteenth century the core of business activity had shifted to Fourth Street, where it largely remains today.

Several major corporations maintain their headquarters downtown, including Kroger, Fifth Third Bank, Procter & Gamble, Western & Southern Financial Group, American Financial Group, and Cincinnati Bell .

The Duke Energy Convention Center, opened in 1968, anchors the city’s convention and meeting industry and contains approximately 750,000 square feet (70,000 m^{2}) of event space.

== Government ==
Several key municipal and county institutions are located in Downtown Cincinnati. City Hall stands on Plum Street and serves as the seat of the city’s executive and legislative branches. The Hamilton County Courthouse, one of the largest courthouses in Ohio, is situated a few blocks away and is linked to the Hamilton County Justice Center through an elevated skybridge used for secure inmate transport.

== Cityscape ==
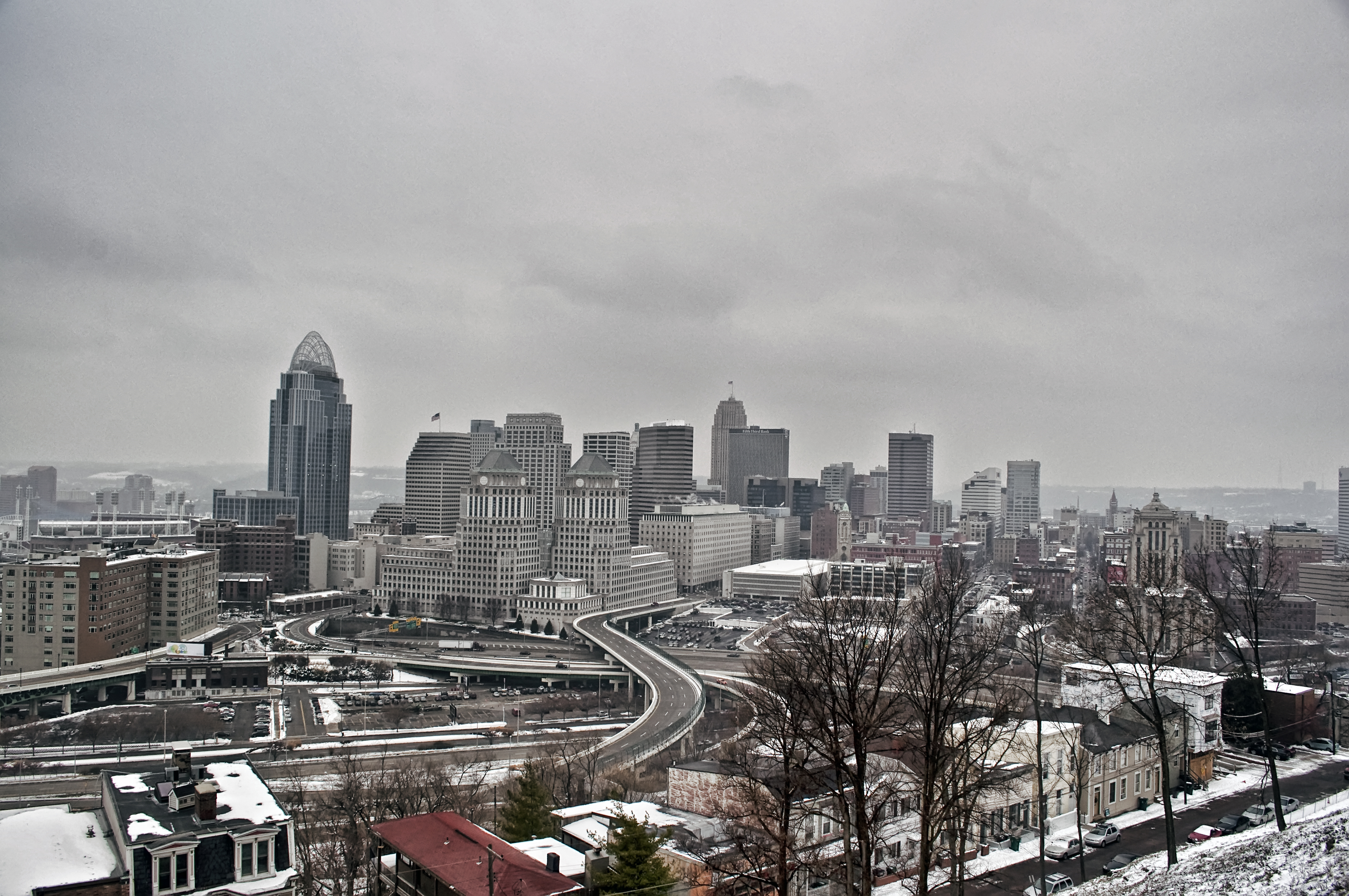
Downtown Cincinnati as seen from Mt. Adams

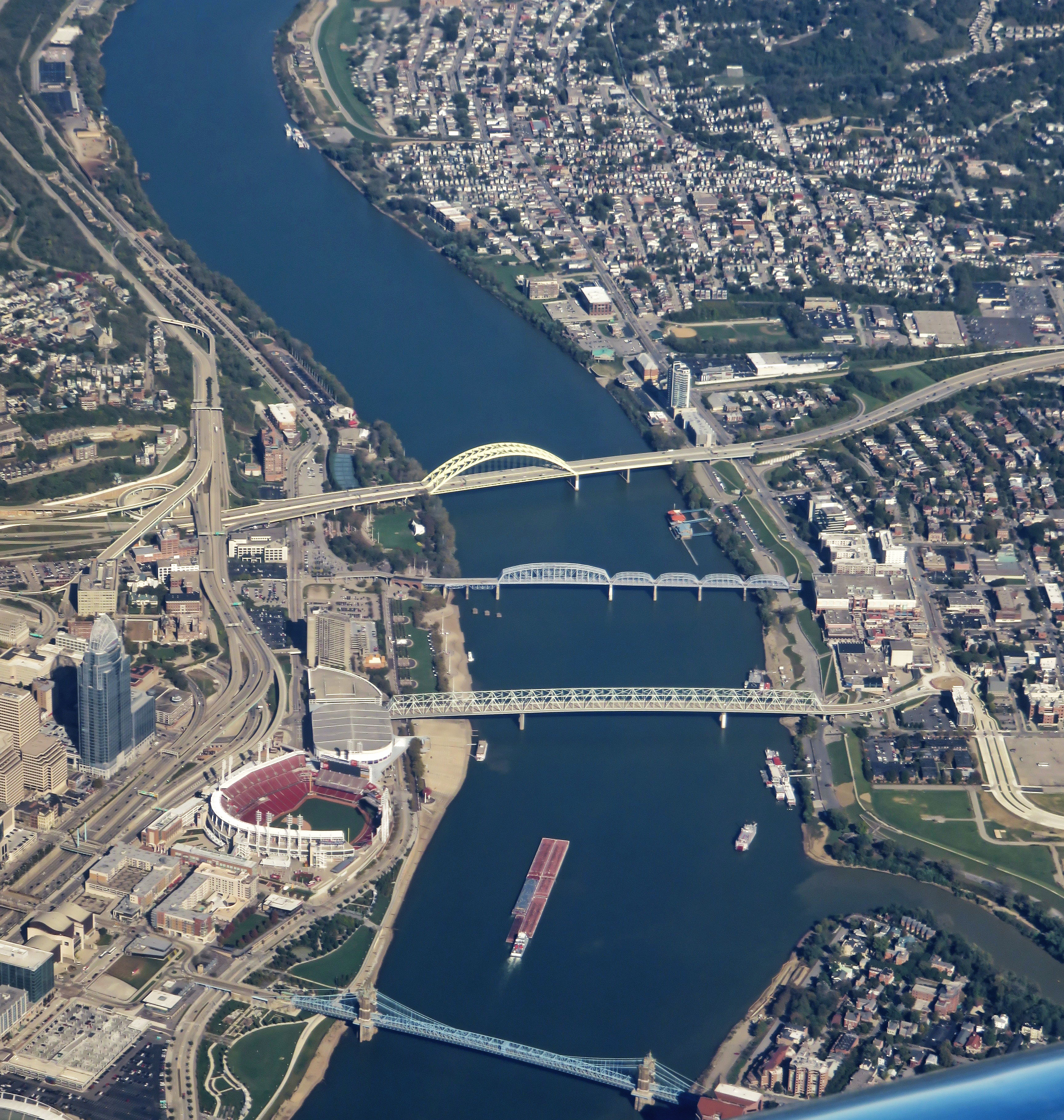
Four bridges over the Ohio River in downtown Cincinnati. At right, parts of Bellevue, Newport, and Covington are visible.

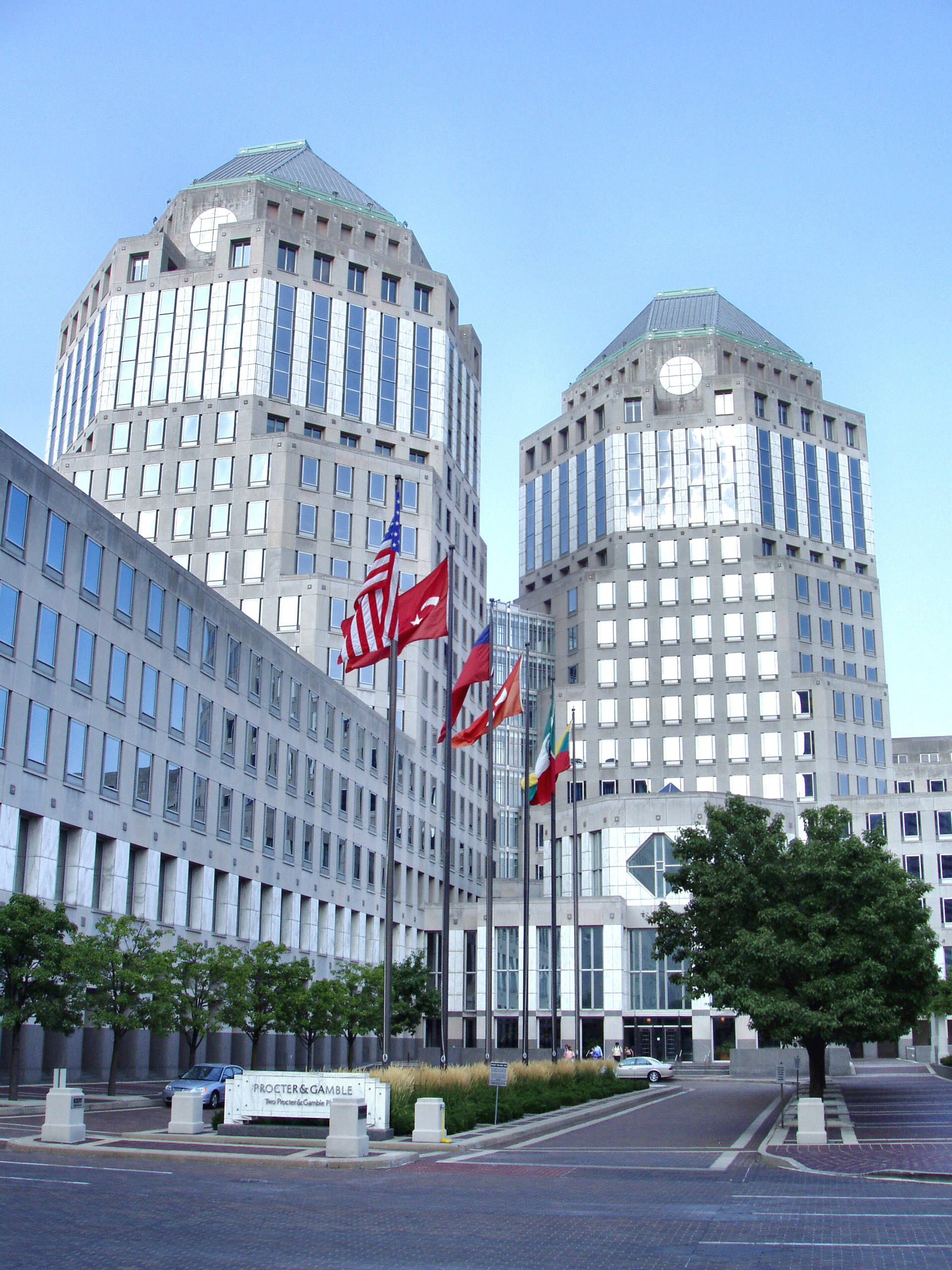
Procter & Gamble headquarters

Downtown Cincinnati is marked by its large collection of historic architecture and contains several historic districts and dozens of buildings on the National Register of Historic Places.

All but one of the twenty-five tallest buildings in Cincinnati are located in Downtown Cincinnati. The Carew Tower had a public observation deck on the forty-ninth floor, though it has since closed.

Since 1971, the Cincinnati Skywalk has connected buildings throughout downtown via a series of primarily indoor, elevated walkways. The Skywalk was officially completed as a 1.3 mile contiguous path in 1997, but has since fallen into disfavor by city leaders, and some sections have been removed.

== Culture ==
Downtown Cincinnati contains several major cultural institutions, including the Contemporary Arts Center, the National Underground Railroad Freedom Center, and the Taft Museum of Art. The Banks a mixed-use development along the Ohio River, features restaurants, bars, and entertainment venues and draws significant activity before and after events at the adjacent Paycor Stadium and Great American Ball Park. Additional nightlife and dining options are concentrated in the Backstage District surrounding the Aronoff Center for the Arts.

== Parks ==
Fountain Square, located at the center of the Central Business District, is the primary public gathering space in Downtown Cincinnati and has been anchored by the Tyler Davidson Fountain since its dedication in 1871. Other downtown parks include Lytle Park, a landscaped green space surrounded by historic buildings, and Piatt Park, the city’s oldest public park.

== Infrastructure ==
Downtown is a transportation hub for the entire region. Downtown is served by Fort Washington Way which connects interstates 71 and 75 with Route 50.

Southwest Ohio Regional Transit Authority operates public transportation with its transit hub at Government Square. The downtown area is also served by the Connector, a streetcar line that connects downtown with Over-the-Rhine.

== See also ==
- Over-the-Rhine
